= The Pallisers =

1974 British TV drama series

- Genre: Costume drama
- Based on: Palliser novels by Anthony Trollope
- Written by: Simon Raven
- Starring: Susan Hampshire; Philip Latham; Roland Culver
- Country of origin: United Kingdom
- Original language: English
- No. of series: 1
- No. of episodes: 26

Production
- Producer: Martin Lisemore
- Running time: 50 minutes

Original release
- Network: BBC Two
- Release: 19 January – 21 November 1974

The Pallisers is a 1974 BBC twenty-six part television adaptation of Anthony Trollope's Palliser novels. Set in Victorian era England with a backdrop of parliamentary life, Simon Raven's dramatisation covers six novels and follows the events and characters over two decades.

The series featured a large cast of both prominent and rising actors.

== Plot ==
The series begins with the story of Lady Glencora, fiancée of the dry, aristocratic Plantagenet Palliser, who will inherit the title of the Duke of Omnium and Gatherum from his uncle. Although they marry, Lady Glencora still pines for her unsuitable but handsome admirer Burgo Fitzgerald.

Palliser becomes aware of this situation and takes his wife on a long tour of Europe, even though he had recently been offered the position of Chancellor of the Exchequer, the one political position he craves. While on their tour, the newlyweds come to a better understanding, and upon their return to London Glencora becomes an ambitious society hostess.

Whilst Plantagenet succeeds in his political aspirations, Irish barrister Phineas Finn is elected to Parliament for the family seat of Loughshane. In London, Finn rises quickly in society and falls in love with Lady Laura Standish, who is struggling to maintain her lifestyle after paying off the debts of her brother, Lord Chiltern.

Lady Laura marries Robert Kennedy, a wealthy Scottish MP, and Finn is forced to resign after a defeat on the Irish Tenant Right issue. Lady Laura's marriage collapses and she moves to Germany. Finn spends Christmas with Lady Laura only to be accused of adultery by Kennedy. Finn is later arrested for murder, but the Pallisers finance his defence. Later Finn's life takes a turn for the better.

Palliser succeeds to the dukedom and becomes Prime Minister but finds the social demands of office difficult. His wife seeks to influence a by-election involving Ferdinand Lopez, who has married for money Emily Wharton, daughter of a wealthy lawyer, and the fall-out affects all involved. The Palliser children start to have romantic involvements.

In the final episodes the marriages of the Palliser children are settled, though not without difficulties.

== Episode synopsis ==
=== 1 to 6 ===
Alice Vavasor cannot decide which man she loves - the upright but boring John Grey, or the dashing but unreliable cousin George, whom she has turned down once already. Glencora loves Burgo Fitzgerald and marries Plantagenet Palliser. These episodes cover more or less the ground of Trollope's first Palliser novel, Can You Forgive Her?.

=== 7 to 11 ===
The start of Phineas Finn's political career and love for Lady Laura Kennedy, then Violet Effingham. Just as Phineas screws up courage to ask Lady Laura to marry him, she forestalls him by telling him she has accepted a proposal of marriage from Finn's wealthy fellow parliamentarian Robert Kennedy. Finn turns to the beautiful Violet Effingham who is also pursued by her childhood sweetheart and Lady Laura's brother, Lord Chiltern. The Duke of Omnium courts Madame Max Goesler. Covers the events in the second of Trollope's Palliser novels, Phineas Finn.

=== 12 to 19 ===
The Eustace Diamonds disappear and Lizzie Eustace is embroiled in a society scandal. The Duke of Omnium dies and Plantagenet and Lady Glencora inherit the title. Phineas Finn is accused of the murder of a fellow MP and Madame Max travels to Prague to find evidence to prove his innocence. Squeezes into eight episodes the main events of Trollope's Palliser novels The Eustace Diamonds and Phineas Redux.

=== 20 to 26 ===
Plantagenet Palliser becomes Prime Minister. Lady Glencora intensifies her activity as a society hostess. The episodes conclude with the death of Glencora, and the story of the marriages of the children, both of whom select partners their father considers unsuitable. These episodes cover the events of the last two of Trollope's Palliser novels, The Prime Minister and The Duke's Children.

== Cast (partial) ==
- Nancy Adams: Abel Wharton's maid
- Anthony Ainley: Rev. Emilius, a shady "man of the cloth" who arrives at Lizzie Eustace's Scottish estate with a couple of other somewhat dodgy "guests", Lord George Carruthers and Mrs Carbuncle
- Terence Alexander: Lord George Carruthers
- Anthony Andrews: Lord Silverbridge, born Plantagenet Palliser II, eldest son of Plantagenet and Glencora Palliser
- Sarah Badel: Lizzie Eustace, née Greystock; scheming but naive and romantic drama queen who inherits the troublesome Eustace Diamonds and the Scottish seaside estate of Portray upon the death of her husband, Florian Eustace
- Robin Bailey: Prime Minister Gresham
- George Ballantine: Smithers, a printer whom Mr Scruby avoids; owes him for 5,000 political pamphlets already disseminated
- Kenneth Benda: Majordomo at the Old Duke's garden parties
- Donald Bisset: In Episode 26; Doctor who tends Glencora
- Sydney Bromley: Mr Clarkson, a most humorously intrusive bill collector
- Bernard Brown: John Grey, a suitor of Alice Vavasor
- Edward Burnham: Mr Turnbull; radical MP and liberal rabble-rouser who spurns public office in favor of a popular agenda as a "champion of the poor"
- Antony Carrick: Superintendent Worth, another policeman involved in the Eustace Diamonds affair
- Anna Carteret: Lady Mabel Grex, cousin of Frank Tregear; early love interest of both Tregear and Lord Silverbridge
- Dallas Cavell: In Episode 10, Captain Colepepper; Lord Chiltern's second in a duel
- Helen Christie: Lady Euphemia Monk, resides at Monkshade with husband Cosmo Monk; aunt of Burgo Fitzgerald who aids him in his campaign to win back Glencora Palliser
- Jeremy Clyde: Gerard Maule, suitor to Adelaide Palliser
- Michael Cochrane: Lord Gerald Palliser, second son of Plantagenet and Glencora
- James Cossins: Sergeant Bunfit, an investigator in the Eustace Diamonds affair
- Brenda Cowling: Mrs Bunce, wife of Mr Bunce the lodginghouse keeper; abhors her husband's political activism
- Roland Culver: The Old Duke of Omnium and Gatherum, uncle of Plantagenet Palliser
- Iain Cuthbertson: Major Mackintosh of Scotland Yard, an investigator in the Eustace Diamonds affair
- Basil Dignam: Sir Orlando Drought, a prominent MP and cabinet member often at odds with Plantagenet Palliser over various political issues
- Veronica Doran: Bonteens' maid
- Fabia Drake: Countess of Midlothian, an aunt and guardian/duenna to the young Glencora McCluskie, before she marries Plantagenet Palliser
- Sonia Dresdel: Marchioness of Auld Reekie, another aunt/guardian of Glencora McCluskie, who, along with the Countess of Midlothian, the Old Duke of Omnium, and even Mr Bott(!) conspire to prevent any pre (and post!)-marital "mischief" on the part of Glencora
- Donald Eccles: The Old Squire Vavasor, father of John Vavasor, grandfather of George Vavasor; present owner of Vavasor Hall, which George hopes to inherit upon the death of the ailing old squire
- Lorna Edwards: Ferdinand Lopez's maid
- Eileen Erskine: Mrs Boncassen, mother of Isabel Boncassen
- Gareth Forwood: Everett Wharton, son of Abel Wharton and brother of Emily Wharton; befriended and used by Ferdinand Lopez to get close to the Wharton family
- Sheila Fay: Mrs Meager, keeper of the London lodginghouse of Rev. Emilius
- Lynne Frederick: Isabel Boncassen, an American love interest of Lord Silverbridge, aka Edward Plantagenet Palliser, Son of Glencora and Plantagenet Palliser
- John Glyn-Jones: John Vavasor, son of Squire Vavasor, father of Alice Vavasor
- Derek Godfrey: Robert Kennedy, an extremely wealthy MP who marries Lady Laura Standish; owner of the huge Scottish estate of Loughlinter
- Gordon Gostelow: Mr Scruby, a somewhat unscrupulous agent for aspiring political candidates
- George Hagan: Mr Gogram, Old Squire Vavasor's Attorney
- John Hallam: Lord Chiltern, born Oswald Standish, brother of Laura Standish
- Susan Hampshire: Lady Glencora Palliser, née McCluskie, marries Plantagenet Palliser early in the series
- Edward Hardwicke: Prince of Wales
- Rachel Herbert: Lady Dumbello, a very early love interest of Plantagenet Palliser
- Jeremy Irons: Frank Tregear, a suitor of Lady Mary Palliser, daughter of Glencora and Plantagenet Palliser
- Derek Jacobi: Lord Frederick Fawn, an awkward and nearly bankrupt Viscount who held several minor government posts; resides at Fawn Court with his mother and seven unmarried sisters
- Joyce Jarvis: Episode 21; Opera Singer
- Martin Jarvis: Frank Greystock, cousin and love interest of Lizzie Eustace
- Carolyn Jones: Patience Crabstick, Lizzie Eustace's servant, implicated in the Eustace Diamonds affair
- Hayden Jones: Mr Bunce, a liberal political rabble-rouser; keeper of the lodging house where Phineas Finn maintains his rooms.
- Alan Judd: In Episode 2; Archbishop who presides over the marriage of Plantagenet Palliser and Glencora McCluskie
- Barry Justice: Burgo Fitzgerald, first love of Glencora McCluskie before her marriage to Plantagenet Palliser
- Penelope Keith: Mrs Clara Hittaway, Lord Fawn's only married sister; loud and overbearing, she drives Fawn to utter distraction with hopeless schemes to marry him off to rich heiresses
- Sheila Keith: Lady Rosina de Courcy, an old friend and confidant of Plantagenet Palliser
- Jo Kendall: Adelaide Palliser, a cousin of Plantagenet Palliser who comes to live with Glencora and Plantagenet
- Josie Kidd: Miss Cassewary, a distant cousin and sometime companion of Lady Mabel Grex
- Rosalind Knight: Episode 9; Aspasia Fitzgibbon, older sister of Lawrence Fitzgibbon, helps the naive Phineas Finn out of a financial jam created by Lawrence
- Philip Latham: Plantagenet Palliser, heir of the Old Duke of Omnium and Gatherum, inherits the title and estates upon the death of the Old Duke
- Helen Lindsay: Mrs Carbuncle, a "guest" at Portray Castle along with Lord George Carruthers and the Rev. Emilius, all of whom take advantage of Lizzie Eustace
- Roger Livesey: Duke of St. Bungay, a dear friend of Plantagenet and Glencora Palliser, also Planagenet's wisest and most loyal/trusted party colleague
- Desmond Llewelyn: Speaker of the House of Commons
- Karin MacCarthy: Kate Vavasor, sister of George Vavasor; takes George's side and won't hear a word against him from Alice or the old Squire Vavasor
- Angus MacKay: Mills Happerton, London agent for a Guatemalan cannon manufacturer; offers Ferdinand Lopez a managerial position in Guatemala, thus completely severing wife Emily from her father, old Abel Wharton
- Leonard Maguire: Andy Gowran, steward and manager of Portray, Lizzie Eustace’s Scottish estate.
- The Maljons: In Episode 11, the acrobats at the Old Duke's garden party
- Mel Martin: Violet Effingham, a good friend of Lady Laura Standish; becomes Lady Violet Chiltern upon marrying Lady Laura's brother, Oswald Standish/Lord Chiltern after a long and rocky courtship
- John Scott Martin: one of Mr Bunce's activist cronies
- Brewster Mason: Abel Wharton, wealthy father of Emily and Everett Wharton
- Anna Massey: Lady Laura Standish, an early love interest of Phineas Finn; becomes Lady Laura Kennedy later in the series, having decided to marry Robert Kennedy for his money and position
- Donal McCann: Phineas Finn, a much-beleaguered Irish MP, often his own worst enemy
- Denis McCarthy: Episode 14; Doctor who tends Mary Finn
- David Morrell: Clerk of the Court
- Caroline Mortimer: Alice Vavasor, a cousin of Glencora Palliser who fears the awful finality of marriage; jilts both of her suitors (twice each!) before finally deciding to marry
- Barbara Murray: Marie Goesler, known as Madame Max Goesler throughout most of the series, then finally as Marie Finn, second wife of Phineas Finn in the latter part of the series
- Jay Neill: In Episode 19; Wedding Photographer
- John Nettleton: Mr Fothergill, the Duke of Omnium's "man of business"
- Máire Ní Ghráinne: Mary Finn, née Flood, Phineas Finn's first wife
- Kate Nicholls: Lady Mary Palliser, only daughter of Plantagenet and Glencora Palliser
- Desmond Perry: Dr Finn, father of Phineas Finn
- Arnold Peters: Policeman
- John Phillips: Sir Gregory Grogram, Attorney-General, later Lord Chancellor under Prime Minister Gresham.
- Donald Pickering: Dolly Longstaffe, an amusing character said to know absolutely all the goings-on in London
- Ellen Pollock: Lady Baldock, guardian of Violet Effingham before her marriage to Lord Chiltern
- Bryan Pringle: Mr Monk; radical MP and cabinet member in the Liberal camp, unrelated to the titled Monks of Monkshade
- Maurice Quick: Collingwood; butler to Plantagenet and Glencora Palliser
- George Raistrick: Member of Parliament
- Edwin Richfield: In Episode 8, the police sergeant who releases Mr Bunce from jail
- John Ringham: Major Tifto, social climbing half-owner of a racehorse with Lord Silverbridge
- Clifford Rose: Quintus Slide, an odious tabloid journalist; editor of The People's Banner
- Sheila Ruskin: Emily Lopez, née Wharton, the naive young daughter of Abel Wharton who marries Ferdinand Lopez
- David Ryall: Sextus Parker, partner of Ferdinand Lopez in several crooked get-rich-quick schemes
- Peter Sallis: Mr Bonteen, an obnoxious politician at the Board of Trade who starts a drunken argument with Phineas Finn; thereafter Finn's bitter enemy
- Edith Saville: Lady Hartletop, a bygone love interest/present friend of the old Duke of Omnium and mother of Lord Dumbello; acts with the Old Duke to stop Plantagenet's misguided "courtship" of young Lady Dumbello very early in the series, before he meets and marries Glencora McCluskie
- Jeffrey Segal: Railway Clerk
- Norman Shelley: Prime Minister Mildmay
- John Slavid: Head Croupier at a casino in Baden, Germany
- Lynn Smith: Alice Vavasor's maid
- Michael Spice: In Episode 23, Inspector Staple, a policeman who brings news of Ferdinand Lopez to Emily and Abel Wharton
- Neil Stacy: Lawrence Fitzgibbon, an arrogant, impudent Irish MP; a good friend of Phineas Finn who nevertheless takes advantage of his financial naïveté; also acts as his second in a duel
- Jerry Stovin: Mr Boncassen, father of Isabel Boncassen
- Bill Straiton: Robert Kennedy's servant
- John Stratton: Mr Harold Bott, an oily but apparently competent liberal MP whom Plantagenet finds useful in his political causes, but whom Glencora finds absolutely revolting
- Stacey Tendeter: In Episode 3, A poor, apparently homeless girl who chances upon Burgo Fitzgerald in a cold dark street as he leaves a London club; in this sweet and wistful scene, Burgo kindly gives her one of his last coins so she can purchase food and a warm place to sleep
- Brian Tully: Mr Sprout, a bootmaker in the Duke's political borough of Silverbridge
- Gary Watson: George Vavasor; cousin and suitor of Alice Vavasor, son of John Vavasor, grandson of Squire Vavasor
- Moray Watson: Barrington Erle, cousin of Lady Laura Standish
- Lockwood West: Lord Brentford, father of Lady Laura and Oswald Standish/Lord Chiltern
- June Whitfield: Mrs Bonteen
- Wendy Williams: Episode 5; Jane, an old girlfriend of George Vavasor
- Stuart Wilson: Ferdinand Lopez, a social climbing London con artist

=== Crew ===
- Director: Hugh David and Ronald Wilson
- Adaptation: Simon Raven
- Script Editor: Lennox Phillips
- Designer: Raymond Cusick

== Production ==
Novelist Simon Raven presented the idea of an adaptation of the Palliser novels to a BBC2 editor and began working on the script in 1969. Raven admitted that he might have offended "Trollope purists" by the additions and subtractions he made. "The most obvious way I have bent Trollope's scheme in the six books is to maintain the relationship between Glencora and Plantagenet throughout the serial. A television serial needs a hero and heroine, and at the expense perhaps of Trollope's own plan, I have blown them up to give them more lasting significance than he indicated."

Production stretched over 13 months and the series was transmitted at the height of industrial action in the UK, marked by Three-Day Weeks and power shortages at the start of 1974. A sudden general election called for February 1974 resulted in the postponement of the series as it dealt with political storylines heavily featuring the Liberal Party, albeit completely fictional. The series resumed, but a second general election in October 1974 caused further transmission challenges. All this contributed to scheduling difficulties and though the series was meant to have finished in June, the final two episodes did not go out until November because of strikes at the BBC.

The series was partly financed by the American Time-Life Films and, in its first presentation in the United States, was the first weekly series of extended length to be screened on pay-television which had previously principally screened films and sport. The then new Home Box Office (HBO) paid a reported $500,000 for a one-year screening licence.

== Reception ==
The series followed the dramatisation of John Galsworthy's Forsyte cycle of novels in The Forsyte Saga (1967). Both projects share the Victorian time period, the multi-generational narrative and the six-month length of the series. Some writers at the time termed it 'Son of Forsyte', although it did not have the impact of the earlier series. The series was re-edited to 22 episodes for its 1970s screenings in the United States on PBS.

Reviewing the series in The Daily Telegraph for its 2015 rebroadcast, Gerald O'Donovan wrote: "In a world where BBC drama tends to be commissioned in taste-testing dribs and drabs of three or six episodes the mere fact that this is a 26-parter seems to imbue The Pallisers with a relaxed, witty confidence that's hard to find in TV drama now". However, he concluded that "The Pallisers, for all its pleasures, is a bauble left over from more extravagant TV times." Neil Clark, in an article for The Guardian the following year, commended this costume drama as "the best of them all" when it was repeated once more. In Clark's opinion: "The Pallisers stands as a reminder of how satisfying television drama can be when writers, producers and directors concentrate on emotion instead of editing, and don't underestimate their audience."

On the other hand, Sylvia Clayton of The Daily Telegraph was not impressted with the adaptation and give it a negative review. She criticised the adaptation for departing from the tone and intentions of Anthony Trollope’s novels. She argued that the serial adopted an overly comic approach to Victorian society, which she felt distorted the characters and diminished the moral and emotional subtlety of the original books. Although she praised the production's visual design and some performances, she maintained that several scenes and characterisations were mishandled.

Seán Day-Lewis of The Daily Telegraph was also not impressed with the series and called it "not successful", noting that its production had been affected by a two‑month BBC strike that disrupted drama output.

== Impact ==
In 1978, Palliser Downs Drive in Hillsborough, Auckland was named after the television series.

== DVD release ==
All episodes of The Pallisers are available on DVD in Australia, the United Kingdom and North America.
