= The Prime Minister (novel) =

1876 novel by Anthony Trollope

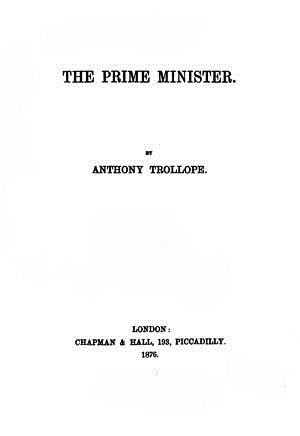
- First edition title page
- Author: Anthony Trollope
- Language: English
- Series: Palliser
- Genre: Novel
- Publisher: Chapman & Hall
- Publication date: November 1875 – June 1876 (serial in 8 parts); 4 volumes, June 1876 (book)
- Publication place: England
- Media type: Print (serial & hardback)
- Preceded by: Phineas Redux
- Followed by: The Duke's Children

The Prime Minister is a novel by Anthony Trollope, first published in 1876. It is the fifth of the "Palliser" series of novels. Robert Caro has called it "the greatest political novel I ever read."

== Plot summary ==
When neither the Liberals nor the Tories are able to form a government on their own, a fragile coalition government is formed, with Liberal Plantagenet Palliser, the wealthy and hard-working Duke of Omnium, installed as Prime Minister of the United Kingdom. The Duchess, formerly Lady Glencora Palliser, attempts to support her husband by hosting lavish parties. Palliser, initially unsure that he is fit to lead, grows to enjoy his high office, but becomes increasingly distressed when his government proves to be too weak and divided to accomplish anything. His own inflexible nature does not help.

A significant sub-plot centres on Ferdinand Lopez, a financially overextended City adventurer of undisclosed parentage and ethnicity, who wins the favour of Emily Wharton. She marries him despite her father's objections, in preference to Arthur Fletcher, who has always been in love with her. As in Trollope's earlier Palliser novel Can You Forgive Her?, in which the heroine also has to choose between two suitors, the enticing and charismatic suitor is revealed to have many unpleasant traits, and Emily soon has cause to regret her choice. Lopez meets the Duchess at one of her parties, and she unwisely encourages him to stand for Parliament in the local Silverbridge constituency. He campaigns against Arthur Fletcher, but withdraws from the contest when he sees he has no chance of winning. Lopez writes to the Duke, insisting on being reimbursed for his election expenses since the Duchess had led him to believe that he would have the Duke's endorsement (despite having his expenses already paid in full by his father-in-law).

The Duke is furious with his wife, who disobeyed his explicit order not to interfere in the election, but his strong sense of personal honour obliges him to meet Lopez's demands. This causes a minor political scandal when it becomes known, as it appears to many people that the Duke used his great influence and wealth to try to buy a seat in Parliament for a supporter. This causes him great unhappiness, but he is stoutly defended in the House of Commons by Phineas Finn, eponymous hero of Phineas Finn and Phineas Redux, two earlier books in the Palliser series.

Lopez's high-risk gambles lead to his financial ruin and, after trying to persuade the wealthy Lizzie Eustace (protagonist of The Eustace Diamonds) to run away with him to Guatemala, a proposition she somewhat contemptuously rejects, he takes his own life by throwing himself in front of a train. After a period of mourning, Emily is persuaded, without too much difficulty, to marry Arthur Fletcher.

Eventually the coalition government breaks up and the Duke resigns, with both regret and relief, and withdraws into private life, hoping to be of use to his party again in the future.
