= The Belton Estate =

1866 novel by Anthony Trollope

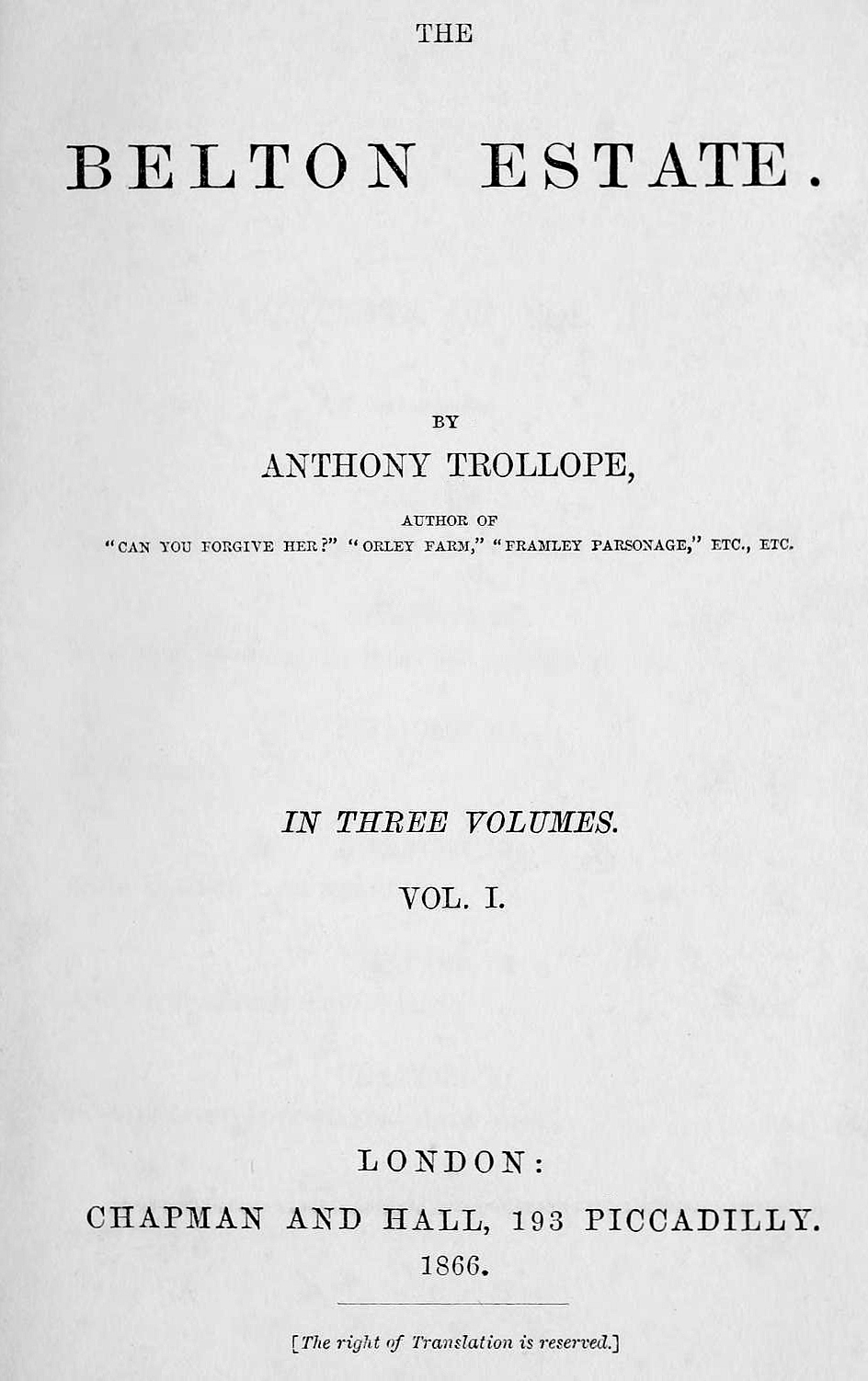
- Title page of the first edition in book form.
- Author: Anthony Trollope
- Language: English
- Publisher: Fortnightly Review (serial); Chapman & Hall (book)
- Publication date: 15 May 1865 – 2 January 1866 (serial); January 1866 (book) (published in 3 volumes)
- Publication place: England
- Media type: Print (Serial, Hardback & Paperback)
- ISBN: 0-19-281725-6 (Oxford University Press paperback edition, 1986)

The Belton Estate is a novel by Anthony Trollope, published first in 1866. The novel concerns itself with a young woman who has accepted one of two suitors, then discovered that he was unworthy of her love. It was the first novel published in the Fortnightly Review.

== Synopsis ==
Clara Amedroz is the only surviving child of the elderly squire of Belton Castle in Somersetshire. At twenty-five, she is old for an unmarried woman. Her father's income and savings have been dissipated to pay for the extravagances of her brother, who subsequently committed suicide. Since her father has no living sons, his estate, which is entailed, will pass upon his death to a distant cousin, Will Belton.

Despite her poor prospects, she has two eligible suitors. Within four days of making her acquaintance, Will Belton proposes marriage to her. Belton is warm-hearted, kind, and generous, and these qualities make a strong impression on Clara. However, she believes herself in love with Captain Frederic Aylmer, although he has given no clear signs of feeling that way toward her. Aylmer is impeccable in his manners, smooth, urbane, well-read, and a member of Parliament; compared to him, Belton is awkward and unpolished.

Clara rejects Belton's offer, urging him to regard her as a sister. Not long thereafter, Aylmer proposes to her, and she eagerly accepts. However, her happiness is short-lived. Her new fiancé proves shallow and cold, more concerned with his own comfort than with her happiness. Moreover, he expects her to subject herself to his domineering mother.

Mr. Amedroz dies; and although Belton offers to allow Clara to remain at Belton Castle, she goes to live with the Aylmer family in Yorkshire. Lady Aylmer, who wants her son to marry money or a title, exerts herself to make Clara miserable there; and Captain Aylmer offers no support to his betrothed.

For Clara, the final straw comes when Lady Aylmer demands that she sever her ties with a friend. Mrs. Askerton, Lady Aylmer has learned, left an abusive drunken husband in India and lived with Colonel Askerton for several years before the death of her husband freed her to marry him. Clara is duly appalled by her friend's past immorality, but cannot bring herself to cast off someone who has come to depend on her friendship. Pressed relentlessly on the subject by Lady Aylmer, she declares an end to her engagement and returns to Somersetshire, where she accepts the hospitality of the Askertons.

Will Belton has never ceased to show his love for Clara, and she realises that he is worthy of her love. However, she believes that it would be wrong to transfer her affection from one man to another. Only after Mrs. Askerton and Will's sister Mary Belton persuade her that it would be unjust to withhold her affection from Will can she bring herself to put aside her scruples and accept him. Marital bliss ensues.

== Major themes ==
The Belton Estate was written shortly after Can You Forgive Her?, and the two novels have a principal theme in common: a woman trying to decide between two suitors, neither ineligible but differing greatly in their desirable and undesirable qualities.

A theme in this novel, not uncommon among other Victorian authors but unusual in Trollope's work, is what John Halperin calls "mediated desire": the desirability of a thing increasing with the difficulty of obtaining it. When Captain Aylmer proposes to Clara, she responds with an enthusiastic affirmative; and this leads him to question the value of his acquisition:

What is there that any man desires,—any man or any woman,—that does not lose half its value when it is found to be easy of access and easy of possession? Wine is valued by its price, not its flavour. Open your doors freely to Jones and Smith, and Jones and Smith will not care to enter them. Shut your doors obdurately against the same gentlemen, and they will use all their little diplomacy to effect an entrance. Captain Aylmer, when he heard the hearty tone of the girl’s answer, already began almost to doubt whether it was wise on his part to devote the innermost bin of his cellar to wine that was so cheap.

== Publication history ==
In 1865, Trollope, George Henry Lewes, and others founded the Fortnightly Review. Somewhat against Trollope's judgement, it was decided that the new magazine was always to contain a novel. Trollope, called upon to produce the first novel, wrote The Belton Estate between 30 January and 4 September 1865; it was serialised in the Fortnightly beginning with its first issue on 15 May 1865, and running through 1 January 1866.

The novel was published in book form by Chapman & Hall in December 1865, with a date of 1866 on the title page. Against Trollope's wishes, it was released in three volumes rather than the two that he had intended.

In his Autobiography, Trollope reported receiving a total of £1757 for The Belton Estate. Of this sum £800 came from the Fortnightly, and another £700 from Chapman & Hall for the first 2,000 copies.

In 1865–66, the novel was serialised in the American Littell's Living Age. It was published in book form in 1866 by Lippincott of Philadelphia, by Harper in New York, and by Tauchnitz in Leipzig. In 1867, it was serialised in French in the Revue Nationale as L'Heritage des Belton, and a Dutch translation, Het Huis Belton, was published in two volumes by Brast of Dordrecht. In 1871, a Russian translation was issued in St. Petersburg under the title Beltonskoy Pomesti; in 1875, Hachette of Paris released a new French translation as La Domaine de Belton.

More recently, an edition with an introduction by John Halperin was published in 1923; it was re-released in paperback by Oxford University Press in 1986. In 1991, the Trollope Society released an edition with an introduction by David Skilton.

== Reception ==
Trollope himself was apparently unimpressed by his work on the novel. In his 1883 autobiography, he wrote: "It is readable, and contains scenes which are true to life; but it has no peculiar merits, and will add nothing to my reputation as a novelist."

Contemporary critics responded negatively to the work. Reviews in the Athenaeum, the Spectator, and the Saturday Review all expressed disappointment. Henry James was particularly scathing, describing the novel as "a work written for children; a work prepared for minds unable to think".

The Belton Estate has since received rather more favourable critical attention. Halperin describes it as "one of [Trollope's] most undervalued novels"; he suggests that this is because it was published at a time when Trollope was quickly putting out some of his finest works: "it got, almost literally, lost." Michael Sadleir considered it among Trollope's five most technically accomplished novels; and (contradicting James) saw it as a skilled triumph of art concealing art.

Feminist literary criticism has approvingly noted the novel's quietly feminist narrator; its undercutting of sexual double standards; and its rejection of conventional Victorian views of femininity.
