= Lady Anna =

Lady Anna may refer to:

- Lady Anna (novel), a novel by Anthony Trollope
- Keran, Queen of Armenia or Lady Anna
