= Palliser novels =

1865–1880 series by Anthony Trollope

- Can You Forgive Her? (1865); Phineas Finn (1869); The Eustace Diamonds (1873); Phineas Redux (1874); The Prime Minister (1876); The Duke's Children (1880)
- Author: Anthony Trollope
- Country: United Kingdom
- Language: English
- Genre: Family saga; Bildungsroman; Picaresque
- Published: 1865–1880
- Media type: Print (Hardback)
- No. of books: 6

The Palliser novels are a set of six novels about interrelated characters by Anthony Trollope. The sequence was more commonly known as the "political" or "Parliamentary" novels well into the twentieth century. They continue to be read, studied and admired, and were famously dramatized by the BBC in a television series titled The Pallisers. Marketed as "polite literature" during their initial publication, the novels encompass several literary genres including: family saga, bildungsroman, picaresque, as well as satire and parody of Victorian (or English) life, and criticism of the British government's tendency to attract the corrupt and the corruptible.

The common characters throughout the series are the wealthy aristocrat and politician Plantagenet Palliser, and his wife, Lady Glencora. The plots involve British and Irish politics in varying degrees, specifically in and around Parliament. The Pallisers themselves do not always play major roles, and in The Eustace Diamonds they primarily comment on the main action.

The series overlaps with Trollope's Chronicles of Barsetshire, also a series of six novels, which deal with life in the fictional county Barsetshire where the Palliser family is politically important.

Trollope considered Can You Forgive Her?, Phineas Finn, Phineas Redux and The Prime Minister to be the four novels that constitute the Palliser series. In his autobiography he wrote:

To carry out my scheme I have had to spread my picture over so wide a canvas that I cannot expect that any lover of such art should trouble himself to look at it as a whole. Who will read Can You Forgive Her?, Phineas Finn, Phineas Redux, and The Prime Minister consecutively, in order that they may understand the characters of the Duke of Omnium, of Plantagenet Palliser, and of Lady Glencora? Who will ever know that they should be so read?

== Plantagenet Palliser ==
Plantagenet Palliser is a main character in the Palliser novels. First introduced as a minor character in The Small House at Allington, one of the Barsetshire novels, Palliser is the heir presumptive to the Duke of Omnium. Palliser is a quiet, hardworking and conscientious man whose chief ambition in life is to become Chancellor of the Exchequer. After an unwise flirtation with the married Lady Dumbello (daughter of Dr Grantly, and granddaughter of the Reverend Mr Harding, characters in The Warden and Barchester Towers), he agrees to an arranged marriage with the great heiress of the day, the free-spirited, spontaneous Lady Glencora M'Cluskie. At first she finds him boring, and considers running away with her other suitor prior to her marriage, the dashing but penniless Burgo Fitzgerald. After he learns of his wife's feelings and plans, Palliser persuades her to travel in Europe to cement their relationship, and is promptly offered the post of Chancellor, which he declines with great regret, since his first priority is his wife. Despite their greatly different natures, the couple settle down to a happy married life. The last book of the series, The Duke's Children, deals with the lives and loves of their three children.

Palliser is eventually offered the post of Chancellor of the Exchequer anyway. However, upon inheriting the dukedom, he is forced to relinquish the beloved post, as it is against constitutional convention for a member of the House of Lords to hold it. In The Prime Minister, when neither the Liberals nor the Conservatives are able to form a majority, a weak coalition government is the only solution. Palliser is asked to become Prime Minister because he is a non-divisive figure, but he is too sensitive to enjoy his tenure. Socially awkward, he is especially vexed by his wife's lavish parties, which represent her attempt to help influence others to support him. Due to the fragile nature of the coalition, Palliser accomplishes little other than to keep the country on an even keel. By the time he leaves office it is with regret, since he has grown accustomed to the power of his position and is greatly disappointed that he has not been able to do more. He declines a place in the Liberal cabinet which follows his, feeling it inappropriate to serve in a cabinet once he has led one, but after some thought he leaves the door open to a return to participation in the government in future. When the Liberals form a government some years later at the end of The Duke's Children, he accepts a cabinet post as Lord President of the Council.

When the Duchess dies unexpectedly, Palliser comes to realise how necessary she has been to his happiness. She has been his only true friend: all others were either merely political allies or her friends. The widower is left to deal with the marriages of two of his three grown children, neither of which initially meets with his approval.

== The Omnium Government (characters mentioned in novels only) ==
=== Cabinet members ===
- Duke of Omnium (Plantagenet Palliser): Prime Minister and First Lord of the Treasury, and Leader of the House of Lords
- Lord Ramsden: Lord Chancellor
- Duke of St Bungay: Lord President of the Council
- Lord Drummond: Secretary of State for the Colonies
- Sir Orlando Drought: First Lord of the Admiralty and Leader of the House of Commons
- Joshua Monk: Chancellor of the Exchequer
- Barrington Erle, Postmaster General

=== Non-cabinet ===
- Phineas Finn: Chief Secretary for Ireland
- Sir Gregory Grogram: Attorney General
- Sir Timothy Beeswax: Solicitor General
- Mr Rattler: Patronage Secretary
- Thomas Roby: Undersecretary for the Admiralty

=== Changes ===
Sir Orlando Drought resigns, ostensibly over disagreements with government policy, but in reality because he believes that the Leader of the House of Commons should be Prime Minister given Palliser's place in the House of Lords, and his political ambitions have been frustrated. He is replaced as First Lord of the Admiralty by Phineas Finn and as Leader of the House of Commons by Joshua Monk, who concurrently retains his post as Chancellor of the Exchequer. The name of Finn's replacement as Chief Secretary for Ireland is not mentioned.

Sir Timothy Beeswax resigns over the County Suffrage Bill. No replacement for him is mentioned.

== List of other characters ==
=== A ===
- Marchioness of Auld Reekie. Lady Glencora's aunt. The Marchioness pressures Glencora to marry Plantagenet Palliser.

=== B ===
- Lady Baldock. Violet Effingham's aunt.
- Ezekiel Boncassen Father of Isabel. A learned American, he is spoken of as a potential President of the United States.
- Isabel Boncassen Love interest of Silverbridge in The Duke's Children. Marries him after being assured that his father approves of the match.
- Mrs Boncassen Mother of Isabel. Portrayed as somewhat ridiculous in London society, but her great love for her daughter is stressed.
- Mr Bott. A somewhat overbearing and fawning member of Parliament, he shadows Palliser. He offends Lady Glencora by watching her dance with Burgo Fitzgerald, and also loses his seat in Parliament during the election held while the Pallisers are abroad.
- Mr and Mrs Bunce. Phineas Finn's landlady and her husband.

=== C ===
- Miss Cassewary. Companion of Lady Mabel Grex.
- Oswald Standish, Lord Chiltern. Aggressive brother of Lady Laura Standish. He was thought at the time to be based on Spencer Cavendish, 8th Duke of Devonshire.

=== D ===
- Mr Daubeny: Conservative Leader of the House of Commons and later Prime Minister. Believed to be based on Benjamin Disraeli.
- Lady Rosina de Courcy. A shrivelled-up old woman whose aristocratic family is now impoverished. She lives in a small cottage near her old home. Plantagenet enjoys her company, although Glencora scornfully reminds her husband that Lady Rosina once tried to marry a brewer to solve her financial troubles.
- Lord de Terrier: Conservative leader, Prime Minister at the time of Phineas Finn's entry into the Commons, but ousted soon afterwards; based on Lord Derby
- Sir Orlando Drought Conservative MP, Leader of the House of Commons and First Lord of the Admiralty in the Omnium government. He believes that as Leader of the House of Commons, he should be Prime Minister, but finds that the Duke of Omnium is not friendly to his views. Resigns, ostensibly over a matter of principle. Appears to have returned to the Conservative Front Bench during the Drummond government.
- Lord Drummond Secretary of State for the Colonies in the Omnium Government; later becomes Conservative Prime Minister, but his government falls near the end of The Duke's Children.

=== E ===
- Violet Effingham. Love interest of Phineas Finn in Phineas Finn. Later the wife of Oswald Standish, Lord Chiltern.
- Barrington Erle Liberal MP and minor Cabinet minister. Postmaster General in the Omnium government.
- Lizzie, Lady Eustace. Formerly Lizzie Greystock, the protagonist of The Eustace Diamonds. The apparent theft of her diamonds rivets society, but at the end of the novel her lies are exposed. She later appears in Phineas Redux and also in The Prime Minister, in which she repels Ferdinand Lopez's advances and attempts to obtain her money.

=== F ===
- Marie Finn: Originally appears in Phineas Finn as Madame Max Goesler, a Viennese widow, and becomes a close friend and confidant to the old Duke of Omnium. At his death she is left diamonds, which she refuses to take. She marries Phineas Finn. An intimate friend of Lady Glencora, and thereafter of her daughter Mary, she is shunned by Glencora's widower Plantagenet, now Duke of Omnium, when he believes that she has encouraged the marriage between Lady Mary and Frank Tregear. Later, she and the Duke reconcile.
- Burgo Fitzgerald. Loved by Lady Glencora before she enters into an arranged marriage with Plantagenet Palliser. Handsome but penniless, he nearly persuades Lady Glencora to run away with her. By the time she encounters him again in a German gambling town, she feels only pity for him, and Palliser arranges for a small pension to be paid to him there.
- Arthur Fletcher. Elected MP for Silverbridge after Grey resigns; marries Emily Lopez (née Wharton) whom he has long loved.

=== G ===
- Mrs Arabella Greenow. Daughter of Squire Vavasor, sister of John and aunt of George, Kate and Alice. Married a rich elderly man, Mr Greenow, and was soon his widow. Shows an interest in her niece Kate and takes her to Yarmouth with her. Mrs Greenow is courted by the dashing wastrel Captain Bellfield and also by the less attractive but well-off Mr Cheesacre.
- Mr. Gresham. Liberal leader and friendly rival of Mr. Daubeny. Prime Minister, succeeding the Duke of Omnium. Believed to be based on William Ewart Gladstone.
- Lady Mabel Grex. Initial love interest of Lord Silverbridge in The Duke's Children. While not in love with Silverbridge, but with Frank Tregear, she plays Silverbridge along in the hope of becoming Duchess of Omnium, but he soon becomes infatuated with Isabel Boncassen. The death of her father, the dissipated Lord Grex, leaves her impoverished, and she is left alone with her companion Miss Cassewary, two old maids together.
- John Grey. Love interest of Alice Vavasor, who later marries him. A wealthy gentleman farmer, he becomes member of Parliament for Silverbridge after Palliser gives up that seat to become member for Barsetshire instead, county seats being more prestigious.

=== J ===
- Mary Jones. Childhood sweetheart, and eventually first wife, of Phineas Finn. She dies soon after they marry.

=== K ===
- Robert Kennedy: Member of Parliament and Phineas Finn's rival for the affections of Lady Laura Standish. He eventually becomes insane.
- Sarah Kennedy. Elderly mother of Robert Kennedy, whom she survives.

=== L ===
- Lady Linlithgow. Acerbic aunt of Lizzie Eustace.
- Ferdinand Lopez: Of doubtful origins, he marries Emily Wharton for her money. Persuades Glencora, Duchess of Omnium, to back him as a candidate in the Silverbridge by-election, which is won by Arthur Fletcher. When in dire financial straits, he throws himself beneath a train at the Tenway Junction.

=== M ===
- Mrs Marsham. She was a friend of Plantagenet Palliser's mother but is disliked by Lady Glencora. Mrs Marsham eventually marries Mr Bott, to Plantagenet's disgust.
- Miss McNulty. Companion of Lady Linlithgow, Lizzie Eustace's aunt, and afterwards of Lizzie herself.
- Countess of Midlothian. A meddlesome old woman who helped to pressure Lady Glencora to marry Plantagenet Palliser. The Countess also interferes in Alice Vavasor's life, though Alice indignantly rejects her advice.
- William Mildmay: Liberal Prime Minister early in the series, greatly admired by Palliser; based on Lord John Russell
- Joshua Monk. Radical member of Parliament for the Potteries, risen from humble origins. Later becomes Chancellor of the Exchequer in the Omnium government, and Prime Minister as the series ends.

=== O ===
- George Plantagenet Palliser, Duke of Omnium; Plantagenet Palliser's uncle. Never married; responsible for the building of the monstrous Gatherum Castle, with some love affairs in his younger years. Former member of Parliament for Silverbridge. Considers marrying Madame Max Goesler (later Marie Finn) but she refuses his offer. Dies, leaving Madame Goesler money and all of his jewels. She does not accept the bequest.

=== P ===
- Lord Gerald Palliser. Second son and second child of the Duke and Duchess of Omnium. Is sent down from Cambridge for unexcused absences, but is later enrolled at Oxford. Loses money at cards.
- Lady Glencora Palliser (daughter). Mentioned once in The Prime Minister and never before or after as Plantagenet and Glencora Palliser's eldest daughter. Possible oversight by Trollope as there is no mention of her death and in The Duke's Children it is made clear that the Omniums have only three children, Lord Silverbridge, Lord Gerald and Lady Mary.
- Jeffrey Palliser. Cousin of Plantagenet Palliser and at the time of Can You Forgive Her? next in line to the dukedom of Omnium after him. Later marries and lives in Gloucestershire.
- Lady Mary Palliser. Youngest child and daughter of Plantagenet and Glencora. Falls in love with Frank Tregear. Her father's initial refusal to accept the match and gradual reconciliation to it forms much of the plot of The Duke's Children.
- Plantagenet Palliser (father). See main article.
- Plantagenet Palliser (son), holds the courtesy title Earl of Silverbridge. See under "Earl of Silverbridge".
- Sexty Parker. Partner of Ferdinand Lopez in The Prime Minister and ruined by him.

=== S ===
- Duke of St Bungay. Liberal politician, who offers Palliser the post of Chancellor of the Exchequer in Can You Forgive Her? Is spoken of as a possible prime minister in Phineas Finn. Serves in a variety of Cabinet posts, and is a close friend and confidant of Palliser.
- Plantagenet Palliser, Earl of Silverbridge Eldest child of Plantagenet and Glencora Palliser. His love initially for Lady Mabel Grex and later for Isabel Boncassen forms much of the plot of The Duke's Children. Involved in a betting scandal. He serves initially as a Conservative, but later as a Liberal Member of Parliament.
- Lady Laura Standish. Friend and love interest of Phineas Finn in Phineas Finn.

=== T ===
- Frank Tregear. Falls in love with Lady Mary Palliser. Her father's objections to the match are gradually worn down, especially once Tregear is elected as a member of Parliament.

=== V ===
- Alice Vavasor. A friend and cousin of Lady Glencora's; eventually marries John Grey after long rejecting him.
- Arabella Vavasor. Daughter of Squire Vavasor. See under Greenow, Mrs Arabella.
- George Adam St George Vavasor. A ne'er do well, who takes money from his cousin Alice to finance ruinously expensive runs for Parliament. Briefly sits in the Commons, but is disinherited by his grandfather and eventually flees to America.
- John Vavasor. Alice's father and George's uncle. Heir to the Vavasor fortune after George is disinherited.
- Kate Vavasor. Sister of George Vavasor and cousin of Alice Vavasor.
- Squire Vavasor. Strong-willed father of John and grandfather of George, Kate and Alice. Though a strong believer in primogeniture, he eventually disinherits George shortly before his own death.

=== W ===
- Emily Wharton. Marries Ferdinand Lopez and is widowed when he kills himself. Later marries Arthur Fletcher.
- Everett Wharton. Emily's brother.
- Mr. Abel Wharton. Emily's father, an attorney in commercial law.

== Adaptations ==
In 1974 the BBC adapted the Palliser novels as a twenty-six part serial The Pallisers, using some material from Trollope's Barsetshire novel The Small House at Allington (1864). This was in turn novelised in a single volume by John Garforth under the alias Tony Hussey.

There was also a 12-part BBC Radio 4 "Classic Serial" dramatisation in 2004, which has been re-broadcast a number of times on BBC Radio 4 Extra. The serial was narrated by David Troughton as Trollope, with Ben Miles as Plantagenet Palliser and Sophie Thompson as Lady Glencora. A new six-part adaptation by Mike Harris under the title The Pallisers began on BBC Radio 4 on 10 November 2019.

The 2017 novel Rich People Problems by Kevin Kwan makes numerous references to the Palliser novels. A secondary character, Colette Bing, marries Lucien Plantagenet Montagu-Scott, Earl of Palliser, son of the Duke of Glencora, whose family seat is located in Barchester in the county of Barsetshire.
