= The Fortnightly Review =

British fortnightly magazine

The Fortnightly Review was one of the most prominent and influential magazines in nineteenth-century England. It was founded in 1865 by Anthony Trollope, Frederic Harrison, Edward Spencer Beesly, and six others with an investment of £9,000; the first edition appeared on 15 May 1865. George Henry Lewes, the partner of George Eliot, was its first editor, followed by John Morley.

The print magazine ceased publication in 1954.

An online "new series" started to appear in 2009.

== History ==
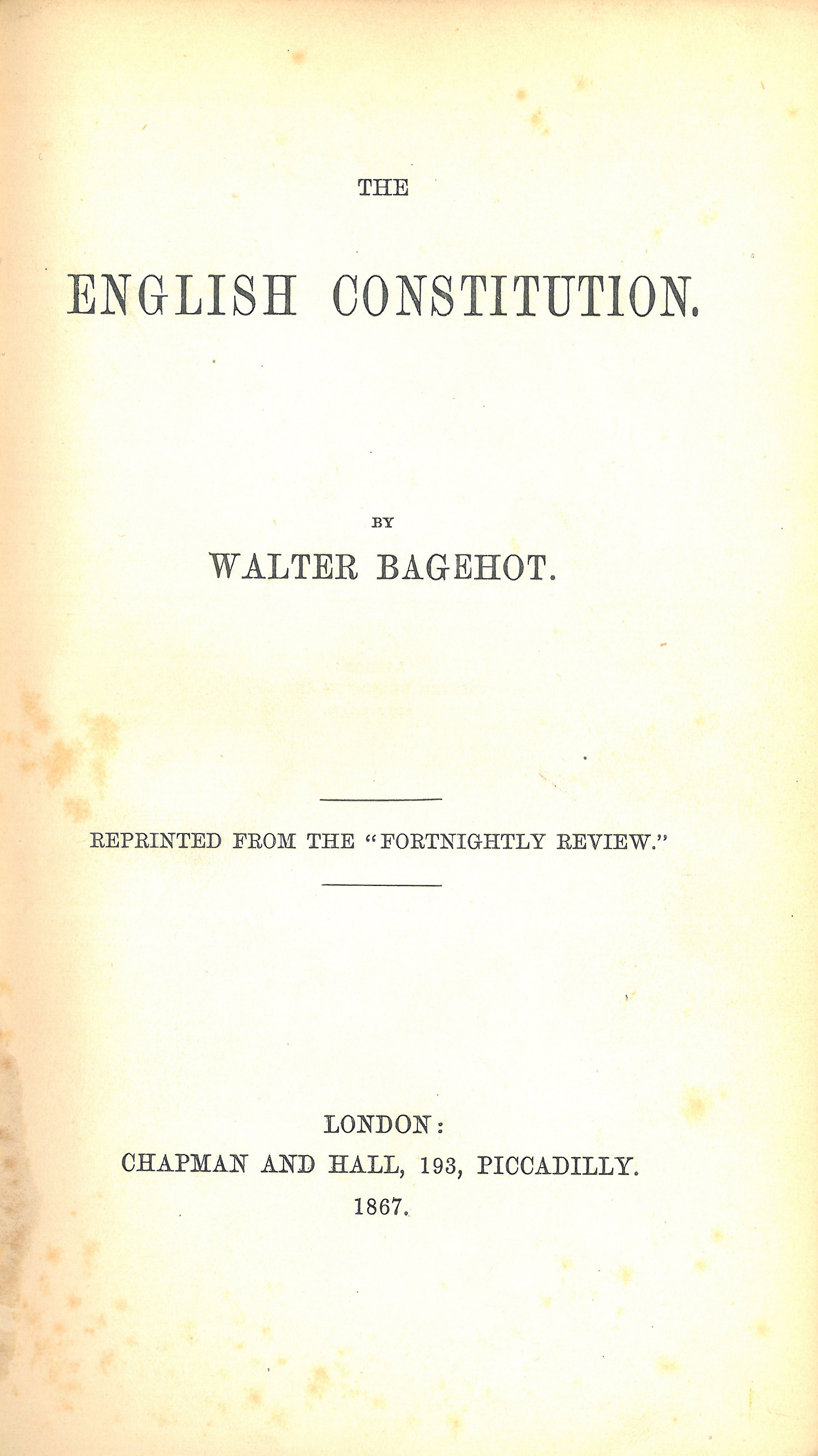
The title page of Walter Bagehot's The English Constitution (1st ed., 1867). As the subtitle indicates, the book was a collection of essays which were first published in The Fortnightly Review between 15 May 1865 and 1 January 1867.

The Fortnightly Review aimed to offer a platform for a range of ideas, in reaction to the highly partisan journalism of its day. Indeed, in announcing the first issue of the Fortnightly in the Saturday Review of 13 May 1865, G. H. Lewes wrote, "The object of THE FORTNIGHTLY REVIEW is to become the organ of the unbiassed expression of many and various minds on topics of general interest in Politics, Literature, Philosophy, Science, and Art." But by the time Lewes left due to ill health and was replaced by 28-year-old John Morley, the Fortnightly had become known as a partisan and Liberal magazine. It was one of the first publications to name the authors of its articles at a time when work usually appeared anonymously or under a pseudonym. As might be expected from its name, it appeared every two weeks during its first year, at 2 shillings a copy, but was published monthly thereafter. John Sutherland called it an English Revue des Deux Mondes and noted that it was "pitched at a higher level than other English journals of its class".

The Fortnightly prospered under John Morley, its sales increasing to 2,500 by 1872. Morley, a liberal, published articles favouring reform in academia, work place relations, female emancipation and religion. A host of famous and soon-to-be-famous literary figures were featured in its pages, with three novels by Anthony Trollope and two by George Meredith appearing in serial form. The first novel serialised in the magazine was Trollope's The Belton Estate, from 15 May 1865 to 1 January 1866. Trollope's The Eustace Diamonds and his radical novel Lady Anna also made their first appearance there. The Fortnightly also published the poetry of Algernon Charles Swinburne, Dante Gabriel Rossetti, and William Morris.

Morley fell out of favour with the more conservative publishers of the journal and was replaced by T. H. S. Escott in 1882. The new editor published political articles from across the spectrum in a return to the Review's original intention. Ill health forced him to relinquish the reins in 1886 when Frank Harris took over for eight successful years. Houghton reports that "almost every distinguished English writer and critic of the day was among his contributors". Harris' liberal views led to his replacement as editor in 1894 by the long serving W. L. Courtney (1894–1928), who featured work from some of the giants of early 20th century literature, including James Joyce, W. B. Yeats, and Ezra Pound. In addition to literature and politics, the magazine also published several articles on science, notably astronomy, animal behaviour and topical issues of instinct and morality, including women's rights items by Virginia Crawford.

Oscar Wilde's aphoristic preface to The Picture of Dorian Gray was published in the March 1891 issue; and George Orwell's essay "Bookshop Memories" appeared in November 1936.

The Fortnightly Review also published several ghost stories by Oliver Onions.

The print magazine changed its name to The Fortnightly. It ceased publication in 1954 and was absorbed by the Contemporary Review in 1956.

=== Online series ===
In 2009 a group of British and American scholars and writers, including philosopher Anthony O'Hear, OBE, director of the Royal Institute of Philosophy, began publication of a "new series" online at fortnightlyreview.co.uk, with the aim of extending Lewes's original editorial ambitions to modern politics, literature, philosophy, science, and art. New articles are sometimes juxtaposed with significant archival material and scholars are given assistance in research that involves the Fortnightly Review.

In partnership with the University of Kansas, where Harris once attended, the Fortnightly publishes the winning essay of the Trollope Prize and a series of books and monographs under its "Odd Volumes" imprint. The current editors are Prof. Alan Macfarlane, FBA (King's College, Cambridge), and Simon Collings. A former editor, Denis Boyles, PhD (CAMRI, University of Westminster), died in 2023.
