= Lady Anna (novel) =

Book by Anthony Trollope

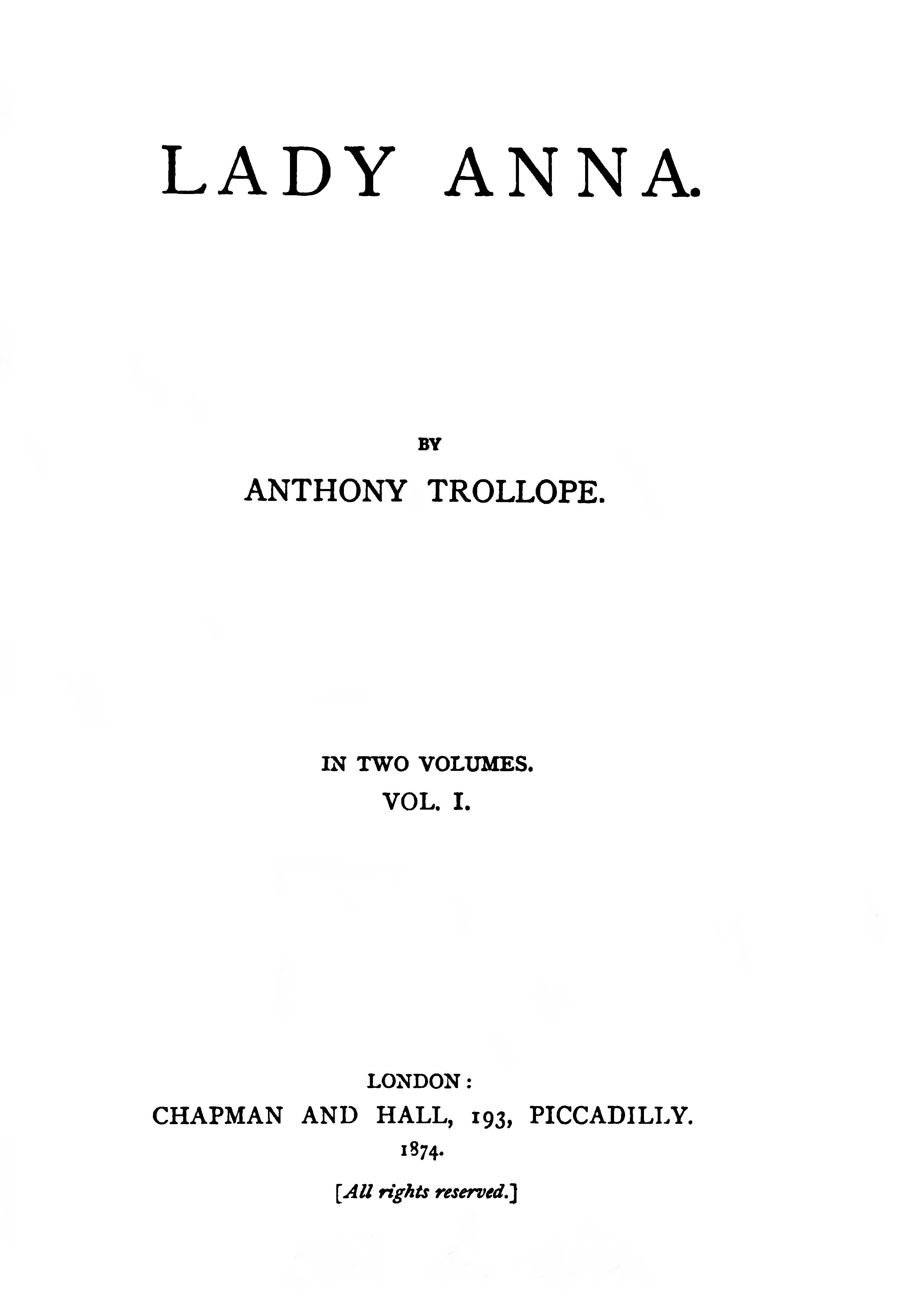
- First edition title page
- Author: Anthony Trollope
- Language: English
- Publisher: Chapman & Hall
- Publication date: April 1873 to April 1874; 2 volumes, 1874
- Publication place: United Kingdom
- Media type: Serialized; Print
- ISBN: 0-19-283718-4 (Oxford University Press paperback edition, 1998)

Lady Anna is a novel by Anthony Trollope, written in 1871 and first published in book form in 1874. The protagonist is a young woman of noble birth who, through an extraordinary set of circumstances, has fallen in love with and become engaged to a tailor. The novel describes her attempts to resolve the conflict between her duty to her social class and her duty to the man she loves.

== Plot summary ==
Lady Anna is set during the 1830s, at about the time of the First Reform Act of 1832.

The title character is the daughter of the late Earl Lovel. Her mother married him out of ambition rather than love, and despite his evil reputation. Soon after their marriage, he told her that he had a living wife, which made their union invalid and their unborn daughter illegitimate. He then sailed to Italy without her and did not return to England for twenty years.

During those two decades, Lady Lovel struggled to prove the validity of her marriage, and consequently her right to her title and her daughter's legitimacy. She enjoyed neither the sympathy of the public nor the support of her family during this time; her only friend and supporter was Thomas Thwaite, a Radical tailor of Keswick, who gave her and her daughter shelter and financed her legal battles.

Early in the novel, Lord Lovel returns to England and dies intestate. His earldom, and a small estate in Cumberland, pass to a distant cousin, young Frederick Lovel. However, the bulk of his large fortune is personal property, and thus not attached to the title. If his marriage to Lady Lovel was valid, it will go to her and to their daughter; otherwise, it will go to the young earl.

The new earl's lawyers, headed by the Solicitor General, come to believe that their case against Lady Lovel is weak and their claim probably false. They accordingly propose a compromise: that the earl marry Lady Anna, thus reuniting the title and the assets held by her father. The plan is enthusiastically supported by Lady Lovel, as fulfilling all of her ambitions for herself and her daughter. The young earl is favourably impressed by Lady Anna's appearance and character. However, in her twenty years as an outcast, Lady Anna has come to love Thomas Thwaite's son Daniel, and the two have become secretly engaged.

When the engagement is known, Lady Lovel and others strive to break it. Lady Anna will not yield to persuasion or to mistreatment; Daniel Thwaite rejects arguments and bribes to end the relationship. Lady Anna is approaching her twenty-first birthday, after which she will be free to marry without her mother's consent. In desperation, Lady Lovel secures a pistol and attempts to murder Thwaite. She wounds but does not kill him; Thwaite refuses to name her to the police; and the attempt puts an effective end to her attempts to keep the two apart.

With Thwaite's consent, Lady Anna makes half of her fortune over to the young earl. She marries Thwaite with the public approval of the Lovel family, though Lady Lovel refuses to attend the ceremony. The two then emigrate to Australia, where they expect that his low birth and her title will no longer be a burden to them.

== Development and publication history ==
In 1871, Anthony and Rose Trollope sailed from England to Australia to visit their son Fred, who had settled at a sheep station near Grenfell, New South Wales. Lady Anna was written entirely at sea, between 25 May and 19 July.

The novel was serialized in the Fortnightly Review between April 1873 and April 1874. It was published in two volumes by Chapman & Hall in 1874.

Trollope received £1200 for Lady Anna; his other 1874 novels, Phineas Redux and Harry Heathcote of Gangoil, earned him £2500 and £450 respectively.

Beside the Fortnightly, the novel was serialized in 1873–74 in the Australasian, and in Russian translation in Vestnik Evropy. In 1873, it was also published in book form by Harper of New York, by Hunter Rose of Toronto, by Tauchnitz of Leipzig, and in Russian as Lady Anna.

More recent editions have included one by Arno Press in 1981; editions by Dover and by Oxford University Press, the latter with an introduction and notes by Stephen Orgel, in 1984; and one by the Trollope Society in 1990.

== Adaptation ==
A play by Craig Baxter, Lady Anna: All at Sea, combining the plot of the novel and the story of Trollope's writing it while voyaging to Australia, was commissioned by the Trollope Society as part of the 2015 Trollope Bicentennial Celebrations. It was presented at London's Park Theatre in 2015.
