= Thomas Hay Sweet Escott =

English journalist

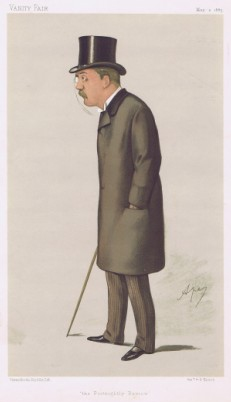
The Fortnightly Review. Caricature of Thomas Hay Sweet Escott by Ape in Vanity Fair in 1885.

Thomas Hay Sweet Escott (26 April 1844, in Taunton – 13 June 1924, in Hove) was an English journalist and editor.

== Life ==
The son of Hay Escott of Launton, he received from Queen's College, Oxford his B.A. degree in 1865 and his M.A. in 1868. At King's College London he was a lecturer in logic from 1865 to 1872 and deputy professor of classical literature from 1866 to 1873.

In 1866 Escott became a leader writer for The Standard. In October 1882 he replaced John Morley as the editor of The Fortnightly Review; in 1886, however, he suffered a physical and emotional breakdown in health and officially resigned in August of that year.

During the last 35 years of his life Escott lived in semi-retirement in Brighton, in poor health. He seems to have written nothing from 1886 to June 1894, and there is no record of his employment during those years. By 1895 he had partially recovered, and he wrote over 100 articles and a number of books before his death in 1924.

His acquaintances included a wide variety of prominent people in literature and the arts, including W. S. Gilbert and Alfred Tennyson. Among Escott's close friends were Wilkie Collins, Charles Reade, and the historian Alexander Kinglake.

== Family ==
Escott married Katherine Jane Liardet in 1865; the marriage produced three children and ended with her death in 1899. His second wife was the widow Edith Hilton.

== Selected publications ==
- England: its people, polity, and pursuits. Vol. 2 vols. 1879.; England: her people, polity, and pursuits, 1880 edition. H. Holt and Company. 1880.
- Randolph Spencer-Churchill, as a product of his age. Being a personal and political monograph. Hutchinson & co. 1895.
- Social transformations of the Victorian age: a survey of court and country. C. Scribner's. 1897.
- Personal forces of the period. Hurst and Blackett, limited. 1898.
- A trip to Paradoxia and other humours of the hour: being contemporary pictures of social and political fiction. Greening & Co. 1899.
- British sovereigns in the century. CIHM/ICMH Microfiche. Vol. 66629. Linscott. 1901. ISBN 978-0-665-66629-2.
- Gentlemen of the House of commons. Hurst, and Blackett. 1902.
- King Edward and his court. T.F. Unwin. 1903.
- Society in the country house. G. W. Jacobs. 1906.
- The story of British diplomacy: its makers and movements. G. W. Jacobs. 1908.
- Edward Bulwer, first baron Lytton of Knebworth: a social, personal, and political monograph. G. Routledge and sons, ltd.; E. P. Dutton and co. 1910.
- Masters of English journalism: a study of personal forces. T. F. Unwin. 1911.
- Anthony Trollope: his work, associates and literary originals. John Lane; John Lane company; [etc., etc.] 1913.
- Club makers and club members. T.F. Unwin. 1914.
- Great Victorians: memories and personalities. T. F. Unwin. 1916.
- City characters in several reigns. E. Wilson. 1922.
- National and international links. E. Nash & Grayson. 1922.
