= The Duke's Children =

1880 novel by Anthony Trollope

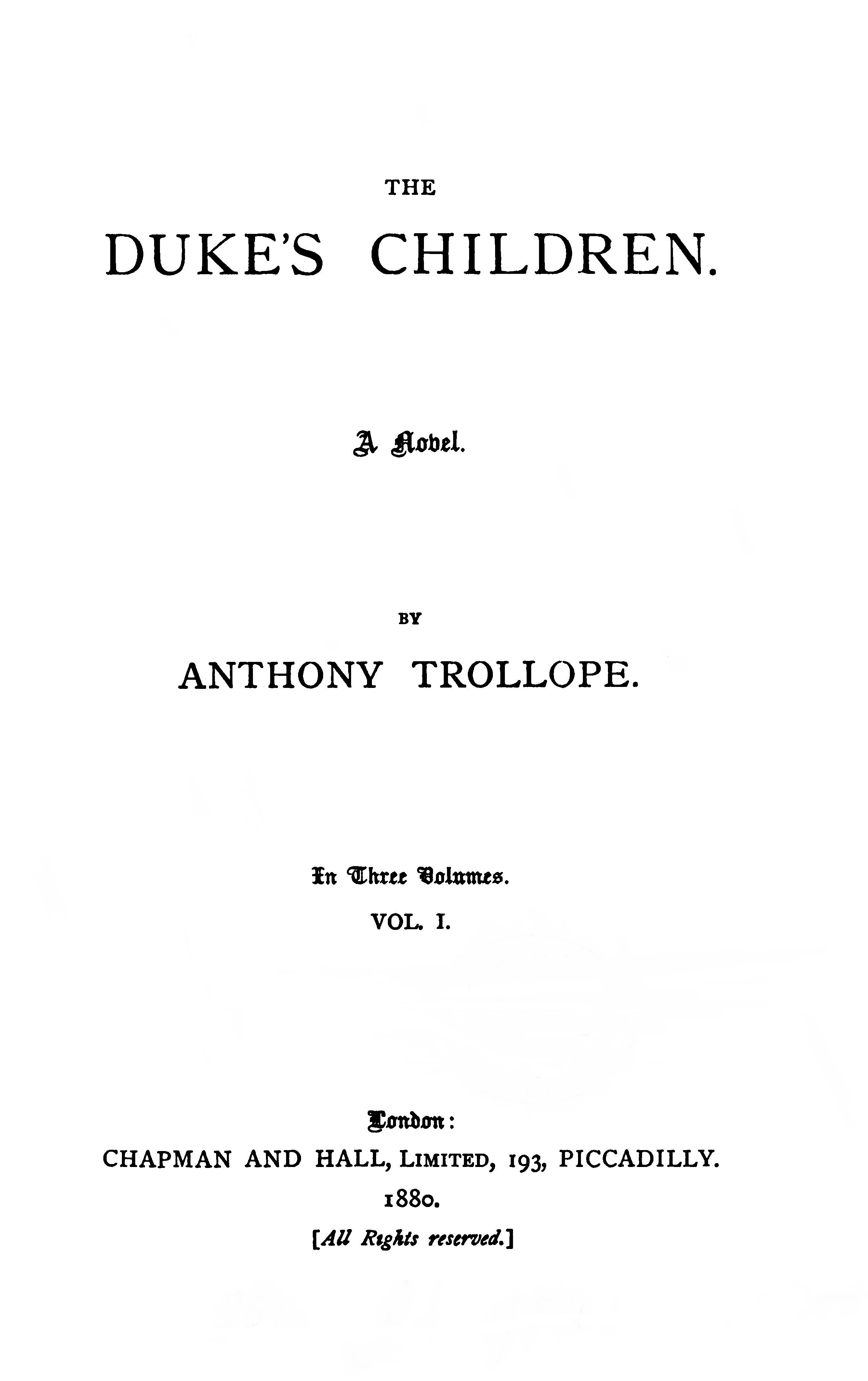
- Title page to the first edition in book form.
- Author: Anthony Trollope
- Language: English
- Series: Palliser
- Genre: Family-saga novel
- Publisher: All The Year Round (serial); Chapman & Hall (book)
- Publication date: 4 October 1879 – 14 July 1880 (serial); May 1880 (book)
- Publication place: England
- Media type: Print (serial & hardback)
- Preceded by: The Prime Minister

The Duke's Children is a novel by Anthony Trollope, first published between 1879 and 1880 as a serial in All the Year Round. It is the sixth and final novel of the Palliser series.

Trollope was obliged to cut around a quarter of his manuscript before it was published in serial and book form. In 2015, Professor Steven Amarnick and colleagues reconstructed an uncut version of the novel from the original manuscript held at Yale University’s Beinecke Library.

== Plot summary ==
Lady Glencora, the wife of Plantagenet Palliser, the Duke of Omnium, dies unexpectedly, leaving the devastated Duke to deal with their grownup children, with whom he has had a somewhat distant relationship. As the government in which he is Prime Minister has also fallen, the Duke is left bereft of both his beloved wife and his political position.

Before her death, Lady Glencora had given her private blessing to her daughter Mary's courtship by a gentleman of modest means, Frank Tregear, who is a friend of Mary's older brother, Lord Silverbridge. Mrs Finn, Lady Glencora's dearest friend and confidante, somewhat uneasily remains after the funeral at the Duke's request as a companion and unofficial chaperone for Lady Mary. Once she becomes aware of the seriousness of the relationship between Mary and Frank, Mrs Finn insists that the Duke be informed; he is strongly opposed to the match.

Managing the Duke's two sons also proves troublesome. Lord Silverbridge intends to follow the wishes of his father by entering Parliament but as a Conservative Party candidate rather than standing for the seat on behalf of the Liberal Party. He proposes to Lady Mabel Grex, whom he has known all his life, and of whom the Duke approves. However, she turns Silverbridge down, due to his immaturity, albeit with a hint of a more welcoming answer another time. However, Silverbridge becomes enamoured of American heiress Isabel Boncassen. She agrees to marry him only if the Duke is willing to welcome her into the family. At first, the Duke disapproves. To add to his troubles, Gerald, his younger son, gets sent down from Cambridge after attending the Derby without permission.

However, by the end of the book, the Duke grows closer to all three of his children; he assents to the engagements of his oldest son and daughter, and he is invited once more to take a part in the government.

== Historical setting ==
Marriages of rich American young women to British aristocrats had just begun to take place when Trollope wrote this book. One of the first such marriages had been that of Lord Randolph Churchill to Jennie Jerome, five years before the book was written—a love match, as is that of Silverbridge and Isabel Boncassen. One difference is that, in the novel, Silverbridge will be very rich in his own right; whereas many Anglo-American marriages transpired in order to import much-needed American money into financially stressed British aristocratic families.

== Publication ==
The Duke's Children was first published between 1879 and 1880 as a serial in All the Year Round. Trollope had been required to shorten the novel from four volumes to three, to Trollope's displeasure: ‘I am at a loss to know how such a task could be performed. I could burn the MS, no doubt, and write another book on the same story; but how two words out of every six are to be withdrawn from a written novel, I cannot conceive.' Regardless, Trollope produced an abridged version of the text over two months in 1878, which Trollope expert Dr Margaret Markwick described as 'almost seamless'.

In 2015, Professor Steven Amarnick and his colleagues reconstructed an uncut version of the novel from the original manuscript held at Yale University’s Beinecke Library. This was published as The Duke's Children: The Complete Text, initially in a limited edition by The Folio Society in 2015, then in mass-market editions by Everyman's Library in 2017 and Oxford World's Classics in 2020.

== Critical reception ==
A 2017 book review by Kirkus Reviews summarised the book as "A thoroughly satisfying classic for those who love long, slow Victorian family dramas." Reviewing the extended and restored version of the book in 2015 for The New York Times, Charles McGrath wrote, "The new version will most likely not change anyone’s view of “The Duke’s Children,” and yet all those tiny excisions do add up. The restored version is a fuller, richer book."
