= Phineas Finn =

1869 novel by Anthony Trollope

Phineas Finn, the Irish Member
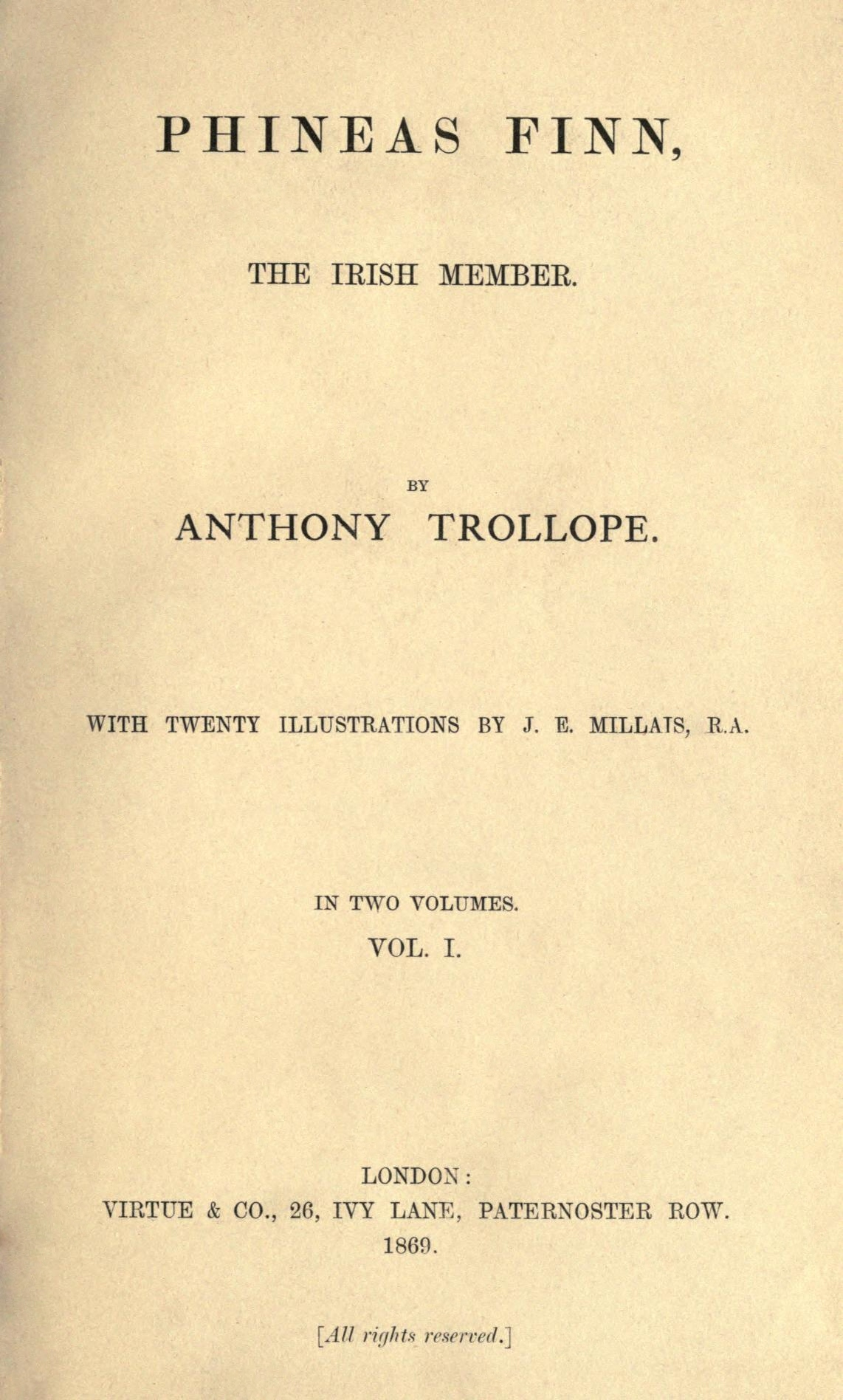
- Title page from the first edition in book form.
- Author: Anthony Trollope
- Illustrator: John Everett Millais
- Language: English
- Series: Palliser
- Genre: Political fiction
- Publisher: St. Paul's (serial); Virtue & Company (book)
- Publication date: October 1867 – May 1868 (serial); March 1869 (book)
- Publication place: England
- Media type: Print (serial and hardback)
- Pages: [i] 320pp; [ii] 328pp
- Preceded by: Can You Forgive Her?
- Followed by: The Eustace Diamonds

Phineas Finn is a novel by Anthony Trollope and the name of its leading character. The novel was first published as a monthly serial from 1867 to 1868 and issued in book form in 1869. It is the second of the "Palliser" series of novels. Its sequel, Phineas Redux, is the fourth novel in the series.

It deals with British politics of the 1860s, including voting reform, secret ballot, rotten boroughs, and Irish tenant-right, as well as Finn's romances with women of fortune, which would secure his financial future.

== Synopsis ==
Volume I: In Killaloe, County Clare, Phineas Finn is the only son of a successful doctor who can afford to send him to London to study law. His friend Laurence Fitzgibbon stirs Finn's appetite for politics. Loughshane, a pocket borough in Ireland, is controlled by Tory Lord Tulla. He declines to oppose Finn's attempt to win the borough for the Liberals.

Finn is elected to Parliament without a salary. He decides to make a go of politics on his father's small allowance. Within the social circle of his fellow MPs, he falls in love with Lady Laura Standish, the wealthy daughter of a prominent Liberal politician. Just before he can propose to her, Lady Laura reveals she has accepted Robert Kennedy. She confides the marriage is necessary to settle the debts of her brother Oswald, Lord Chiltern.

Lady Laura mentors Phineas and helps him advance through the party. He makes a disastrous maiden speech, but he gets on well with his peers, particularly reformer Joshua Monk. Tulla reconciles with the Tories, and Finn cannot retain his seat. He happens to save Mr. Kennedy from a garrotting. Lady Laura convinces her father to let Finn stand for the family borough of Loughton, since her brother is uninterested in representing it.

Chiltern and Finn become close friends. Chiltern's family has long intended for him to marry Violet Effingham, a wealthy orphan who lives with her aunt. Violet has refused Chiltern's proposals countless times. Finn becomes enraptured by Violet and pursues her. Chiltern is incensed by what he sees as a betrayal and challenges Finn to a duel.

Volume II: Chiltern and Finn duel in Blankenberg. Finn does not aim at Chiltern, but Chiltern wounds him.

A wealthy widow, Madame Max Goesler, begins to socialise in Parliamentary circles. She becomes Finn's confidante. He is appointed Under-Secretary of State for the Colonies, with a salary of £2,000 a year.

Lady Laura's marriage grows more difficult as Kennedy cannot ignore her interest in Finn. Kennedy even suggests their relationship may be improper. Lady Laura refuses to live with a man who suspects her and retreats to her father's. Kennedy will not relinquish his rights as a husband. So, Lady Laura flees to Dresden.

Finn follows his party's support for a Reform Act, even though it means his own seat will be abolished. He finds Lord Tulla is indifferent to Loughshane again, and wins the seat back. He returns to Ireland with Mr. Monk, who is on a speaking tour in support of Irish tenant farmers. Finn gives a speech at their stop in Dublin where he supports a vote on Monk's tenant-right bill. While in Ireland, he proposes to Mary Flood Jones, a friend of his sister who has loved him since she was a teenager.

Because Monk's bill is not the official policy of the party, Finn is at odds with the leadership. He is despondent that he must resign. Madame Goesler offers to marry him and support his career with her fortune. Though tempted, Finn returns to Mary in Ireland. His party rewards Finn's previous service with a £1,000/year sinecure as a poor-law inspector in Cork.

== Characters ==
- Phineas Finn – only son of an Irish doctor, trains as a lawyer, becomes a member of parliament (MP) for various constituencies, and attains a ministerial position.
- Lady Laura Kennedy (née Standish) – wife of Mr. Kennedy, whose proposal she accepts to cover her brother's debts.
- Violet Effingham – orphan and heiress, close friend of Lady Laura, and intended for Oswald.
- Oswald, Lord Chiltern – reprobate brother of Lady Laura; his proposals are constantly rejected by Violet.
- Robert Kennedy – MP and owner of a massive estate in Scotland
- Lord Brentford – father of Lady Laura and of Lord Chiltern.
- Madame Max Goesler – wealthy widow who woos both the Duke of Omnium and Phineas.
- Laurence Fitzgibbon – MP and party functionary who cons Phineas into accepting his debts.
- Barrington Erle – Party functionary, private secretary to Prime Minister Mildmay.
- Mary Flood Jones – friend of Phineas' younger sister Barbara and in love with Phineas.
- Mr. & Mrs. Bunce – Phineas' landlord and landlady in London.
- Mr. Low – Phineas' law tutor.
- Dr. Malachi Finn – father of six children, of whom Phineas is the only son.
- Mr. Monk – a reformer who becomes Finn's mentor
- Mr. Turnbull – a radical MP
- Mr. Mildmay – Prime Minister when the novel begins
- Mr. Gresham – Prime Minister when the novel ends

== Historical background ==
In October 1867, the very month that Phineas Finn began its serial run, Trollope resigned his position in the General Post Office. His salary was now dwarfed by his royalties. When the 14th instalment of the novel was being published, in November 1868, Trollope ran as a Liberal in the Parliamentary election for Beverley. He finished last, and the seat was held by the Conservative Party although the general election returned the Liberal Party to a parliamentary majority. Ironically, the Beverley election was set aside and the seat voided because of bribery, touching on some of the central issues of Trollope's novel.

Phineas Finn is the second instalment of Trollope's hexalogy known as The Palliser Novels, often referred to as his political or Parliamentary novels. The author considered Phineas Finn and Phineas Redux to be two halves of one novel, despite the fact that the latter instalment was published as the fourth in the series, after The Eustace Diamonds.

=== Politics ===
Phineas' saga begins Trollope's political project in earnest. In order to enable him to shift the focus of the cycle more towards Parliament, Trollope was given permission by the Speaker of the House of Commons to observe proceedings for several months.

Trollope covers a wide range of current political issues in Phineas Finn, such as the construction of the Canadian Pacific Railway, the War Office's procurement process, disestablishment of the Irish Church, and corrupt electoral practices such as treating. The novel sends up the vacuity of politics by showing Liberals and Conservatives voting against their own stated positions when they see a tactical advantage in doing so. Several policy tensions are structural to the plot of the novel.

Trollope regretted making Ireland Phineas' home. It created narrative issues he could not tidily resolve, and he felt it made English readers less sympathetic towards his protagonist. Phineas is supposed to be a Liberal, but his opposition to Home Rule is antithetical to the politics of the 1860–70s. Yet his downfall comes when he adopts Mr. Monk's Liberal position on tenant rights, during their Irish tour. The closer he is to home, the more Irish he is and the more liberal.

Voting Reform is the chief political tension of the novel, and Trollope largely dramatises the actual events behind the Second Reform Act. The bill was designed by Liberal Prime Minister Earl Russell to increase the voting population by 40% and resolve issues such as rotten boroughs, which had not been fully addressed by the Reform Act 1832. It was defeated in June 1866, just five months before Trollope began writing Phineas Finn. That led to the resignation of Russell's government and the rise of the Conservative Disraeli, who produced his own version of the bill. Disraeli's Act ended up doubling the voting population and led to the Liberal Party returning to power in the election of 1868. Trollope changes very little in this sequence of events, aside from making the Liberals the ultimate reforming party.

=== Personalities ===
Phineas Finn was seen as a roman à clef. Initial reviews immediately speculated on the real identities of Trollope's characters, and scholars have continued the guessing game. Despite Trollope's public insistence that he was not parodying politicians, he admitted cannibalising their affects in his private writings.

Phineas Finn is viewed as a composite of the traits and personalities of various figures, including his author. One common suggestion for the inspiration for the character is John Pope Hennessy, a Roman Catholic from Cork, who was elected as an Irish Nationalist Conservative MP for King's County in 1859. Since the publication of the book, conjectures have pointed to a wide range of people including John Sadleir, Chichester Fortescue, William Gregory, Colonel King-Harman, and Isaac Butt.

Mr. Mildmay is commonly identified as John Russell, who was serving as Prime Minister when Trollope was drafting the novel. Mr. Daubeny was supposed to be Disraeli. Mr. Gresham was William Gladstone. Lord Chiltern was assumed to be Spencer Cavendish.

Partially because Madame Max Goesler and Phineas marry in Redux, her character is often surmised as a gloss on Frances, Dowager Countess Waldegrave, who made Chichester Fortescue her fourth husband.

== Publication history ==
Trollope wrote Phineas Finn from 17 November 1866 to 15 May 1867. His 800-page quarto manuscript is owned by Beinecke Library at Yale. The novel was serialized in St. Paul's Magazine from October 1867 to May 1869. Each of the 20 installments included a captioned illustration by John Everett Millais:

1867

- 1. October: Chapters I-IV
- 2. November: V–VII
- 3. December: VIII–XI

1868

- 4. January: XII–XV
- 5. February: XVI–XIX
- 6. March: XX–XXIII
- 7. April: XXIV–XXVI
- 8. May: XXVII–XXX
- 9. June: XXXI–XXXIII
- 10. July: XXXIV–XXXVII
- 11. August: XXXVIII–XLI
- 12. September: XLII–XLVI
- 13. October: XLVII–L
- 14. November: LI–LIII
- 15. December: LIV–LVII

1869

- 16. January: LVIII–LXI
- 17. February: LXII–LXIV
- 18. March: LXV–LXVIII
- 19. April: LXIX–LXXII
- 20. May: LXXIII–LXXVI

Virtue & Company published it in two volumes with Millais' illustrations in March 1869. Harper & Brothers brought out an American edition in July of that same year.

James Virtue paid Trollope £3,200 for the novel's copyright. That figure matched what he was paid for his next book, He Knew He Was Right. Trollope's advances declined steadily afterwards. Phineas Finn did not sell enough copies to make a profit.

== Response ==
The Spectator favorably reviewed the book version of Phineas Finn in 1869. It found the title character to be frustratingly drawn by Trollope without enough of an inner life. However, it did praise Lord Chiltern as a near peer of the "indelible" George Vavasor in Can You Forgive Her?, and felt that Mr. Kennedy "is as wonderful a picture as Mr. Trollope has yet drawn."

The Saturday Review panned the novel primarily because of its portrayal of Mr. Turnbull, whom it deemed to be a thinly disguised version of John Bright. Dismissing most of the author's characters as forgettable, it lamented, "It is only the contemplation of Mr. Bright that acts upon Mr. Trollope as a red rag upon a bull," and they excoriate the practice of violating the confidence of a politician's "after-dinner conversations and habits". The review concludes that Phineas Finn's only utility will be so a "future historian may refer to it to discover what was the material of which Mr. Bright’s waistcoats were made."

The Daily Telegraph attacked Trollope for his unflattering portrayal of politicians, particularly John Bright. Comparing his practice, and that of Benjamin Disraeli, to witches tormenting wax figures, the Telegraph said, "The author of Vivian Grey did something utterly indefensible when he introduced public men as characters in his tales. That is an entirely unfair use of the story-teller’s art…no novelist, is warranted in using gossip or reports—true tales or lying legends—which he has heard in the confidence of private life". Trollope wrote a letter the day the Telegraph's review appeared and insisted that his novel was not drawn from life. He protested that he only meant to depict a "turbulent demagogue" in Mr. Turnbull. "I intended neither portrait or caricature, and most assuredly I have produced neither."

The Dublin Review had high praise for the novel and Trollope's writing in general, "He holds a place, not only unrivalled, but undisputed, as the realistic portrayer of the middle classes of English society." Their review praised his knowledge of "the machinery of Parliament" and the issues of "the land question in Ireland", which they felt exceeded the familiarity of average Irishmen themselves. They found the novel such a sympathetic portrait of Ireland that they urged, "some Irish constituency should do itself the honour of gratifying Mr. Trollope's unaccountable desire to enter Parliament.

== Adaptations ==
In 1974 the BBC2 adapted the Palliser novels as a twenty-six part serial The Pallisers. Episodes 7–12 dramatize the events of Phineas Finn, with Donal McCann portraying Phineas. Michael Hardwick abridged the six novels into a 400-page book to capitalise on the series, although The Eustace Diamonds and The Duke's Children are not fully covered by the abridgement.

BBC Radio 4 commissioned a "Classic Serial" dramatisation of The Pallisers in 2004. It was adapted by Martyn Wade and directed by Cherry Cookson. BBC Radio 4 Extra has rebroadcast it a number of times. Conleth Hill voiced Phineas Finn, with Ben Miles and Sophie Thompson as the Pallisers. David Troughton narrated.

A new six-part adaptation by Mike Harris under the title The Pallisers began on BBC Radio 4 on 10 November 2019. In this version, Phineas is voiced by Edward MacLiam.
