= Phineas Redux =

1874 novel by Anthony Trollope

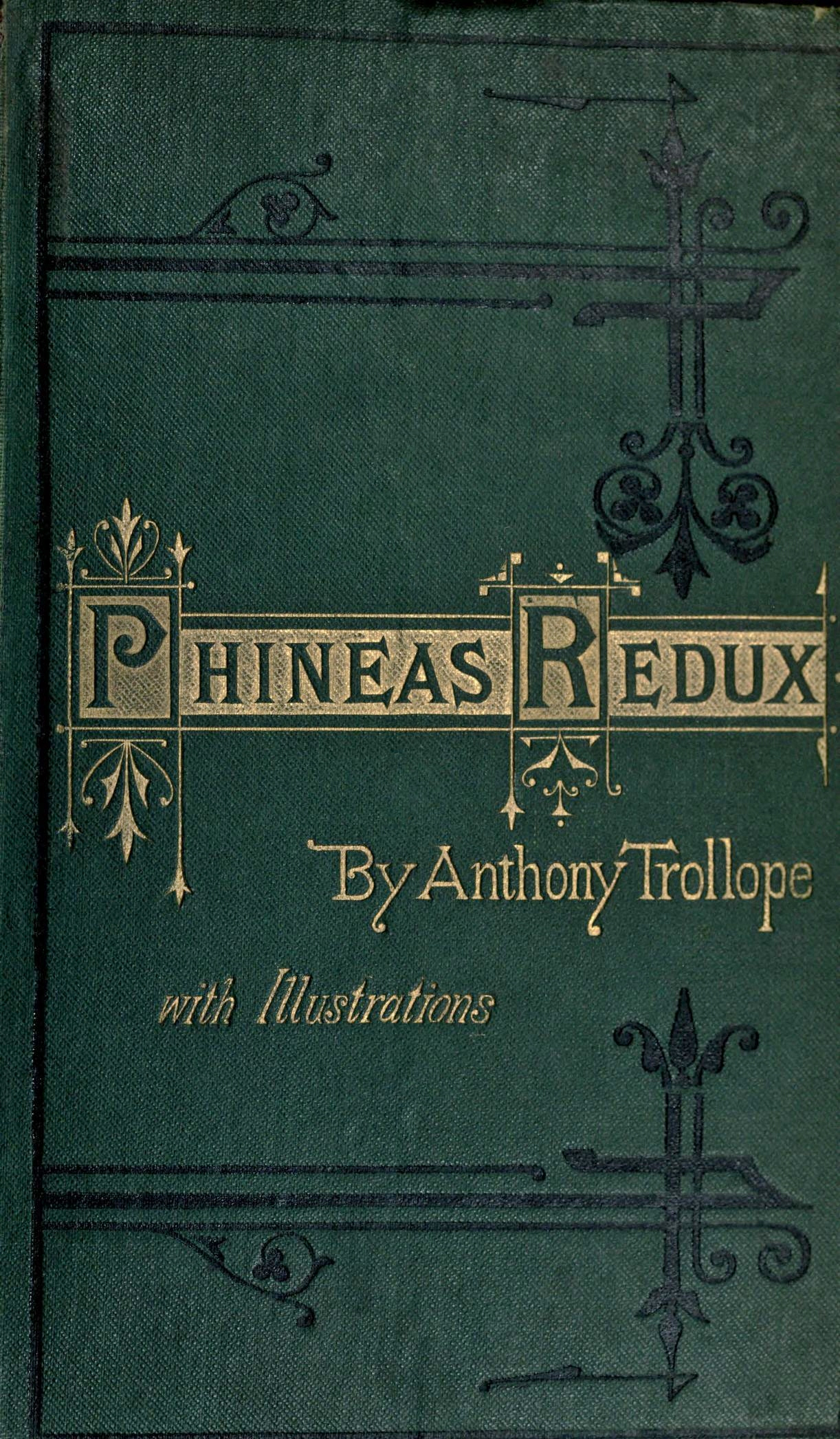
- Cover to the first edition in book form.
- Author: Anthony Trollope
- Illustrator: Francis Montague Holl
- Language: English
- Series: Palliser
- Genre: Picaresque novel
- Publisher: The Graphic (serial); Chapman & Hall (book)
- Publication date: 19 July 1873 – 10 January 1874 (serial); December 1874 (book)
- Publication place: England
- Media type: Print (serial, hardback & paperback)
- Preceded by: The Eustace Diamonds
- Followed by: The Prime Minister

Phineas Redux is a novel by Anthony Trollope, first published between 1873 and 1874 as a serial in The Graphic. It is the fourth of the "Palliser" series of novels and is a sequel to the second book of the series, Phineas Finn.

== Plot summary ==
His beloved wife Mary having died during pregnancy, Phineas Finn finds Irish society and his modest government position in Ireland dull and unsatisfying after the excitement of his former career as a Member of Parliament. Back in England, the Liberals are determined to overturn the Conservative majority in Parliament. As Finn had been considered the most promising of the younger set, he is encouraged to stand for Parliament again, and he takes the risk of giving up his salaried position.

Returning to London, he renews his acquaintance with the wealthy widow Madame Max Goesler. In the past, she had offered to marry him and had been gently turned down; after an awkward first encounter, they renew their friendship.

In the political arena, Finn loses the election by a narrow margin, but his luck does not desert him. On appeal, it is found that his opponent had bribed some of the voters; their disqualification is enough to give Finn the victory.

He makes an enemy within his own party. Mr Bonteen makes disparaging remarks about his political trustworthiness, referring to an incident, described in Phineas Finn, when Finn voted with his conscience rather than his party about Irish tenant rights. The conflict spirals out of control when neither man will back down, and they become bitter foes.

When Bonteen is murdered, suspicion falls on two men. One is the Reverend Mr Emilius, estranged husband of Lady Eustace (the main character of The Eustace Diamonds). At Lady Eustace's urging, Bonteen had travelled to Prague and found evidence that Emilius was still married to another woman when he wedded Lady Eustace, thus making the marriage invalid and safeguarding her wealth. The other suspect is Finn. He and Bonteen had been seen to quarrel publicly on the night of the murder and the circumstantial evidence points to him, while Emilius did not have a key to exit his lodgings with. Finn therefore is brought to trial. Not unexpectedly, the murder of one Member of Parliament allegedly by another quickly becomes a public sensation.

During the trial, Madame Max travels to Prague in search of evidence against Emilius, and she finds a locksmith who had made a duplicate key for Emilius. This, along with other developments, convinces everyone that Finn is innocent and Emilius guilty. It is not enough to convict the latter, but Finn is acquitted.

Afterwards, Finn, worn out by the ordeal and disillusioned with politics, refuses an invitation to take office in the government, and marries Madame Max.

== Trollope's pro-Irish sentiments ==
Victorian literature was generally anti-Irish. Phineas Redux and its companion, Phineas Finn, are cited as counterexamples. Trollope, who had earlier worked in Ireland for the General Post Office, also wrote a number of novels set there.
