= Can You Forgive Her? =

1864–1865 novel by Anthony Trollope

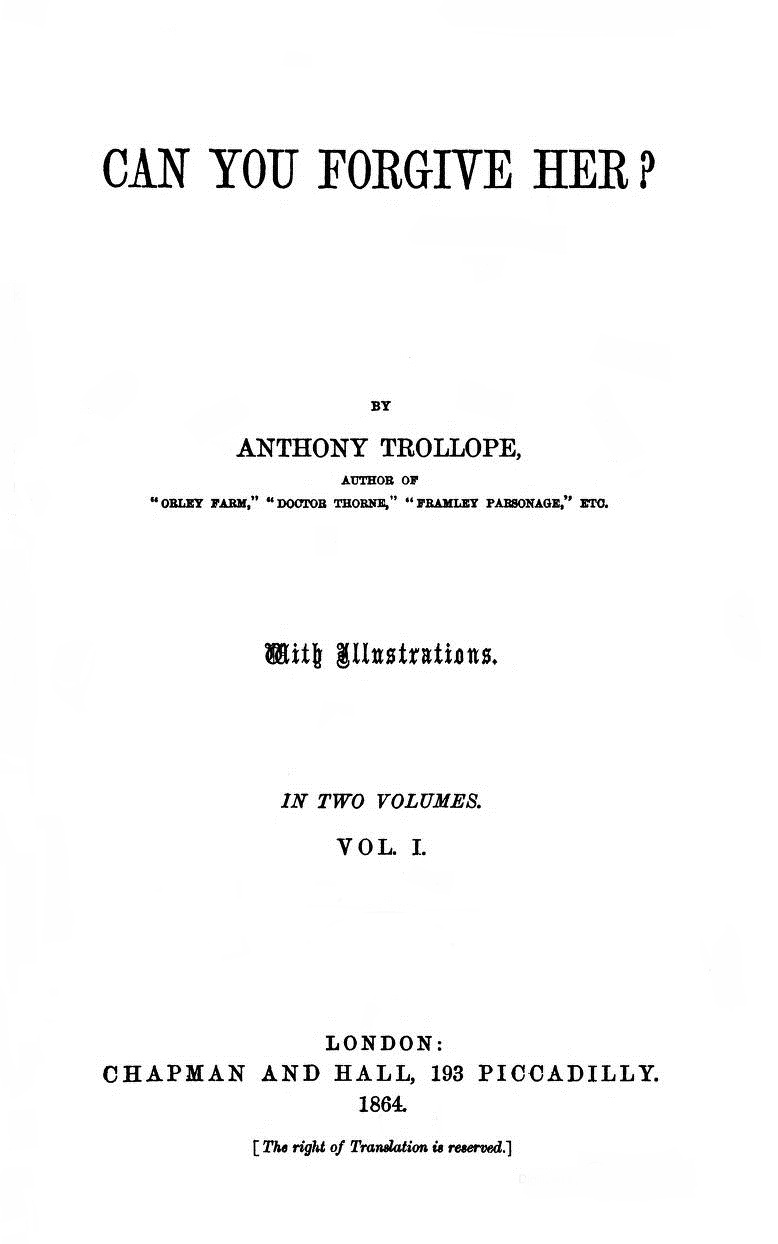
- First edition title page
- Author: Anthony Trollope
- Illustrator: Hablot Knight Browne (Phiz) & Miss E Taylor
- Language: English
- Series: Palliser
- Subject: Victorian English life
- Genre: Novel
- Publisher: Chapman & Hall
- Publication date: September 1864 (Vol. I) & July 1865 (Vol. II)
- Publication place: England
- Media type: Print (hardback)
- Followed by: Phineas Finn

Can You Forgive Her? is a novel by Anthony Trollope, first published in serial form in 1864 and 1865. It is the first of six novels in the Palliser series, also known as the Parliamentary Novels.

The novel follows three parallel stories of courtship and marriage and the decisions of three women: Alice Vavasor, her cousin Glencora Palliser, and her aunt Arabella Greenow. Early on, Alice asks the question "What should a woman do with her life?" This theme repeats itself in the dilemmas faced by the other women in the novel. Lady Glencora and her husband Plantagenet Palliser recur in the remainder of the series.

== Background ==
An early form of the novel appeared in Trollope's play The Noble Jilt, which was written in 1850 and would not be published in his lifetime. It was released in a limited press run in 1923. Trollope wished to use this title for Can You Forgive Her?, but feared that critics would think Alice Vavasor was not sufficiently noble.

Trollope published Can You Forgive Her? in monthly installments throughout 1864, before turning it into a two volume novel through the Chapman and Hall publishing house. The first volume was illustrated by noted Dickens artist Phiz; however, Trollope complained of the finished product, stating that he could not think of a worse illustrator, and that he refused to see his book contain such pictures. The second volume was instead illustrated by Marcus Stone.

== Plot ==
Alice Vavasor, a 24 year old woman, is engaged to the wealthy, respectable, dependable, if unambitious and bland, John Grey. She had previously been engaged to her cousin George, but broke it off after he went through a wild period. John, trusting in his love, makes only the slightest protest about Alice's planned tour of Switzerland with her cousin Kate, George's sister, even when he learns George is to go with them as their male protector. Influenced by the romance of Switzerland, by Kate's contriving to restore George to Alice's favour, and by her own misgivings about John's shortcomings, Alice jilts her second fiancé.

Alice's noble but despised relations are shocked, but their protests only strengthen Alice's resolve, and she eventually renews her engagement to George, who seems charismatic, ambitious and alluring, in contrast to John. She respects his honesty in acknowledging in his letter proposing their marriage that her money would support his parliamentary ambitions, and she tells him that he can draw on her funds even before they marry. Ever attentive to Alice's welfare, John secretly pays the money instead.

George wins the byelection, but finds the financial demands and prospect of the forthcoming general election to be crushingly disappointing. Now desperate, his darker side becomes increasingly visible. He has fantasies about murdering his grandfather, and breaks Kate's arm when the old man dies of natural causes having denied George his inheritance. He comes last in the general election after his grandfather's death and estrangement from Kate. In despair, and after learning of John's interference in his campaign and engagement, he almost murders John before escaping to America.

A second story involves the comic rivalry between the wealthy farmer Cheesacre and the pauper soldier Captain Bellfield for the affections (and substantial inheritance) of the widow Mrs Greenow. Mrs Greenow, the aunt of Alice, George, and Kate, had married young to a very rich older man who had recently died. Still in mourning, which for her involves a great deal of performance, she also enjoys basking in the attentions of her beaux and pitting them against each other. Finally she decides to marry the more attractive Captain Bellfield, knowing that she can keep him under control.

The third story deals with the marriage of the extremely rich Plantagenet Palliser to the even wealthier heiress Lady Glencora M'Cluskie. They are not very well suited. He is a stiff-necked, hardworking politician in line to be Chancellor of the Exchequer, while she has a lively, fun-loving personality and a well-developed sense of humour. She is outspoken and often shocks Alice by her frankness. The marital situation is made more tense by Glencora's failure to conceive a child. Previously, she had been engaged to Burgo Fitzgerald, an aristocratic wastrel, but the same noble relations that protested about Alice's jilting of John Grey had successfully pressured Glencora to abandon Burgo to marry Plantagenet. But Glencora is still passionately in love with Burgo, who plots to elope with her. To Alice's dismay, Glencora argues that it would be for the best if she eloped with Burgo, as then Plantagenet could divorce her and marry someone else who could give him children. She publicly dances with Burgo at a ball and nearly agrees to go with him, even at the risk of her fortune and reputation.

Plantagenet sacrifices his political ambitions to save his marriage by taking Glencora on a European tour, with Alice accompanying them. After some rancorous travelling, Glencora finds that she is pregnant, which solidifies her marriage and fulfils Plantagenet's life, though it is clear that Glencora does not love him. John Grey pursues Alice to Switzerland to renew his courtship and eventually wins her over again. Although Alice loves him, her acceptance of him is not whole-hearted and is described in terms of a surrender. Having jilted him before, she struggles to forgive herself and feels she is unworthy of him. She finally relents, noting that he had "left her no alternative but to be happy." They become engaged and Plantagenet persuades his new friend to run for Parliament. Alice is somewhat pleased by this as she had been dissatisfied with John's earlier lack of ambition.

Back in England, Mrs Greenow marries Bellfield, Glencora gives birth to a son, and Alice finally marries John. Alice's happiness is temporarily alloyed by a sense of defeat at having her wedding turned into a formal social event where she endures the reproachful lectures of high-ranking relations she had sought to avoid. Trollope suggests that she is fortunate not to have suffered more by trying to defy social convention.

== Characters ==
- Mrs Arabella Greenow, a wealthy widow; the aunt of Alice Vavasor
- Mr John Grey, the member of parliament for Silverbridge who is in love with Alice Vavasor
- Lady Glencora M'Cluskie Palliser, the wife of Plantagenet Palliser whose early love for Burgo Fitzgerald is renewed
- Plantagenet Palliser, the heir to the Duke of Omnium, he gives up becoming Chancellor of the Exchequer to save his marriage
- Alice Vavasor, a headstrong young woman who eventually marries John Grey
- George Vavasor, the scarred, dangerous cousin of Alice Vavasor who takes her money to run for Parliament
- John Vavasor, the father of Alice
- Kate Vavasor, the sister of George
- Captain Gustavus Bellfield, the rakish suitor of Arabella Greenow
- Mr Bott, the obsequious parliamentary supporter of Plantagenet Palliser who spies on Glencora
- Samuel Cheesacre, a rural Norfolk farmer who tries to court Arabella Greenow
- Burgo Fitzgerald, the handsome but penniless nephew of Lady Monk who attempts to court Lady Glencora
- Lady Margaret Midlothian, a busybody relative of Alice Vavasor who is critical of her conduct
- Lady Monk, the aunt of Burgo Fitzgerald who encourages his pursuit of Lady Glencora Palliser and provides him with funds

== Reception ==
The satirical periodical Punch mocked the work, referring to it as Can You Stand Her? due to its writers' irritation at Alice's ineptitude in deciding between her two suitors. Henry James, when writing for the New York Nation, quipped "Can we forgive Miss Vavasor? Of course we can, and forget her too, for that matter."

In his memoir about writing, Stephen King pokes fun at the book's length, joking that for modern audiences a more appropriate title might be Can You Possibly Finish It?

The lead singer of the Pet Shop Boys, Neil Tennant, wrote the song "Can You Forgive Her?" in 1992 after reading Trollope's novel whilst on holiday.

Gina Gionfriddo titled her 2016 play Can You Forgive Her?. The protagonists deal with similar marital issues as those in Trollope's novel.
