= Ralph the Heir =

1870 novel by Anthony Trollope

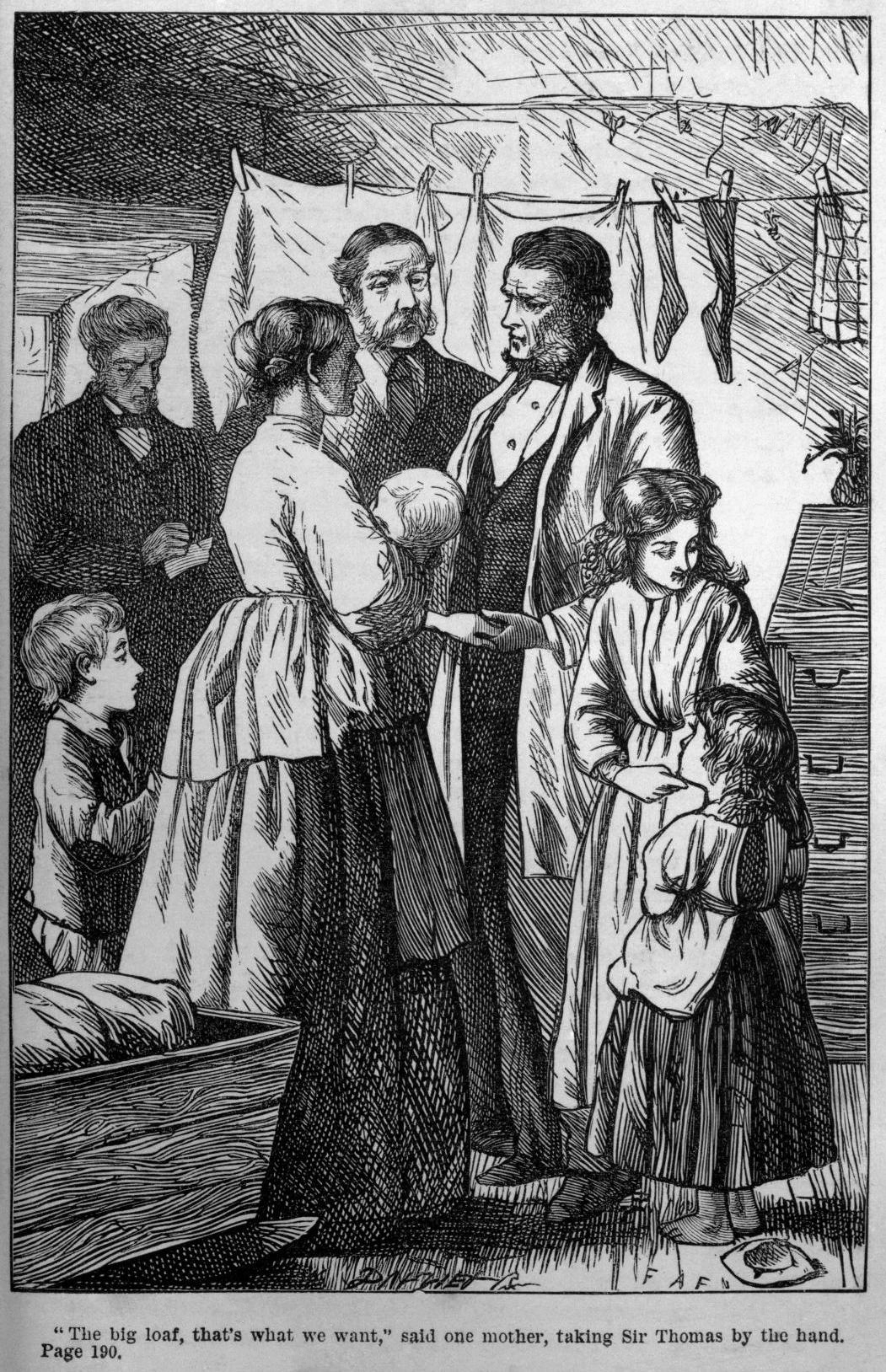
- F. A. Fraser illustration: Sir Thomas campaigning in Percycross
- Author: Anthony Trollope
- Language: English
- Publisher: Hurst and Blackett
- Publication date: January 1870 to July 1871; 3 volumes, 1871
- Publication place: United Kingdom
- Media type: Serialized; Print
- ISBN: 0-486-23642-0 (Dover paperback edition, 1978)

Ralph the Heir is a novel by Anthony Trollope, originally published in 1871. Although Trollope described it as "one of the worst novels I have written", it was well received by contemporary critics. More recently, readers have found it noteworthy for its account of a corrupt Parliamentary election, an account based closely on Trollope's own experience as a candidate.

== Plot summary ==
The title character is Ralph Newton, the nephew of Squire Gregory Newton of Newton Priory. The squire has never married; he has an illegitimate son, also named Ralph Newton, whom he loves dearly. However, the estate is entailed, and after his death will go to his nephew Ralph; he cannot leave it to his natural son.

Ralph the heir is a spendthrift, and has run himself deep into debt. There are two ways in which he can extricate himself: by raising money on his future interest in the Newton estate, or by marrying Polly Neefit, the daughter of a wealthy breeches-maker who is one of his major creditors. Neither choice is a good one for him: the first might lead to the estate's being seized by his creditors upon the old squire's death; the second would mean allying himself to a family of a much lower social class, thus putting his own social standing at risk.

The squire, anxious to obtain full possession of the estate so that he can pass it to his son, offers to buy the heir's reversion. Ralph vacillates, hesitatingly proposes to and is rejected twice by Polly Neefit, and eventually accepts his uncle's offer. However, before the transaction can be completed, the squire is killed in a hunting accident and his nephew comes into full possession of the property and its large income.

Now safe from his creditors, the new squire is nevertheless harassed by Polly Neefit's father, who threatens him with legal action and embarrassing publicity if he does not continue seeking his daughter's hand. The matter is eventually resolved by Polly, who accepts the oft-repeated proposals of Ontario Moggs, son of a prosperous bootmaker, and induces her father to consent to the marriage despite his preference for the squire. In the meantime, Ralph the squire has proposed to and been rejected by Mary Bonner, the beautiful niece and ward of Sir Thomas Underwood; soon after this, she accepts an offer of marriage from the illegitimate Ralph.

The novel also describes a Parliamentary election in the fictional borough of Percycross, in which Sir Thomas, a Conservative, and Moggs, a Radical, are two of the four candidates for the two available seats. Both are eager that the election be conducted fairly and honestly. The other two candidates, one a Conservative and one a Liberal, are the incumbents; they see nothing wrong with the buying and selling of votes that has been traditional at Percycross. Sir Thomas and his fellow Conservative win the election, but it is annulled on petition, and the borough is disfranchised by Parliament because of its pervasive corruption.

== Development history ==
=== Beverley campaign ===
Trollope had long dreamt of taking a seat in the House of Commons. As a civil servant, however, he was ineligible for such a position. His resignation from the Post Office in 1867 removed this disability, and he almost immediately began seeking a seat for which he might run. In 1868, he agreed to stand as a Liberal candidate in the borough of Beverley, in the East Riding of Yorkshire.

Party leaders apparently took advantage of Trollope's eagerness to run and willingness to spend money on a campaign. Beverley had a long history of vote-buying and of intimidation by employers and others. Every election since 1857 had been followed by a petition alleging corruption, and it was estimated that 300 of the 1,100 voters in 1868 would sell their votes. The task of a Liberal candidate was not to win the election, but to give the Conservative candidates an opportunity to display overt corruption, which could then be used to disqualify them.

Trollope described his period of campaigning in Beverley as "the most wretched fortnight of my manhood". He spent a total of £400 on his campaign. The election was held on 17 November 1868; the novelist finished last of four candidates, with the victory going to the two Conservatives. A petition was filed, and a Royal Commission investigated the circumstances of the election; its findings of extensive and widespread corruption drew nationwide attention, and led to the disfranchisement of the borough in 1870.

Trollope wrote Ralph the Heir between 4 April and 7 August 1869, less than a year after the Beverley campaign. Although there are differences of detail between the fictional election at Percycross and the historical one at Beverley, the one was clearly based on the other. In his 1883 autobiography, Trollope wrote: "Percycross and Beverley were, of course, one and the same place."

=== Publication history ===
Ralph the Heir was initially published as a supplement to St. Paul's Magazine in monthly numbers from January 1870 to July 1871. In April 1871, it was published in three volumes by Hurst and Blackett. Also in 1871, a one-volume edition was published by Strahan and Co.; an English-language edition was released by Tauchnitz of Leipzig; an American edition was issued by Harper; and a Russian translation, Naslednik Ralph, was published in St. Petersburg. In 1872, the novel was published in Danish as Arvingden Ralph; in 1874, a Swedish translation, Ralph, was released in Stockholm

More recently, editions of the novel have been released by Dover in 1978, by Oxford University Press in 1990, and by the Trollope Society in 1996.

Trollope received a total of £2,500 for the novel: the same amount that he had received for The Vicar of Bullhampton the previous year, and that he received for The Eustace Diamonds two years later.

== Adaptations ==
Charles Reade adapted the plot of Ralph the Heir for the stage under the name Shilly-Shally. The play ran for a month in 1872 at the Gaiety Theatre in London, with Trollope and Reade listed as the authors. Trollope, who at that time was travelling in Australia, complained that his name and his plot had been used without his knowledge or consent; however, copyright law at the time gave an author no recourse in such a case.
