= Jewish Women's Congress =

Event held in 1893

- Date: 4–7 September 1893
- Venue: World's Columbian Exposition
- Locations: Chicago, Illinois
- Country: United States
- Attendance: 93
- Organiser: Hannah G. Solomon; Sadie American

The Jewish Women's Congress was held at Chicago, Illinois, on 4–7 September 1893 as part of the World's Parliament of Religions at the World's Columbian Exposition. Chaired by Hannah G. Solomon, it the first gathering of Jewish women who came together for the consideration of something other than charity or mutual aid. During the conference, there was conceived an idea which developed into the National Council of Jewish Women, a permanent organization to unite Jewish women in the United States.

== History ==
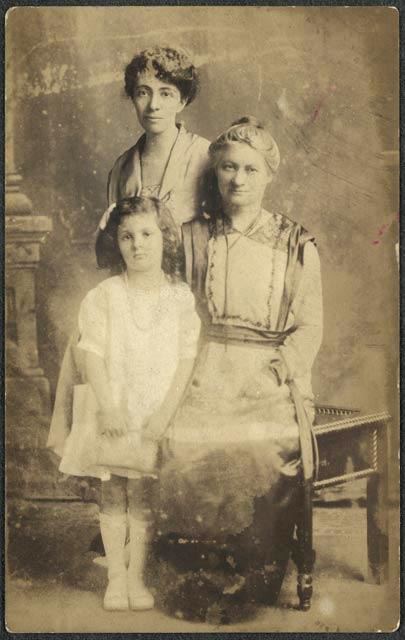
Hannah G. Solomon (on right)

When the World's Fair Congress Auxiliary was organized, it was determined that, among the other congresses, a Parliament of Religions should be held. The Parliament consisted of a General Parliament of all religions and of denominational Congresses. The General Committee on Religious Parliament was composed of two branches, one the men's, the other the women's committee. It consisted of representatives of every denomination, including Ellen Martin Henrotin, vice-president of the woman's branch.

At the first meeting of the Jewish Women's Committee, it was decided to work along the lines adopted by the other committees. The Committee also decided to collect and publish the traditional melodies of the Jews as a souvenir of the occasion. In order to arouse the interest in the Jewish Congress and the souvenir, notices were issued to all Jewish publications, inviting the co-operation of all persons interested. Circular letters were sent to the larger cities, asking Jewish women to hold mass meetings to elect delegates. This measure was more successful than had been anticipated, 29 cities being represented by 93 delegates.

An extensive correspondence was carried on in the US and England, with no less than 2,000 letters having been written and received by the members of the Committee. The Programme Committee obtained subjects for papers from many sources, also names of women to write them. It was no easy task to arrange the programme and choose the essayists. It was found that every section of the country could be represented. Two representatives were chosen to present papers in the General Parliament.

Two resolutions were passed during the business meeting: to publish the entire proceedings of the Congress, and to band together into a new organization, the National Council of Jewish Women.

== Papers ==
- "Jewish Women of Biblical and Mediaeval Times," Louise Herschman Mannheimer (Cincinnati, Ohio)
- "Jewish Women of Modern Days," Helen Kahn Weil (Kansas City, Missouri)
- "Influence of the Discovery of America on the Jews," Pauline Hanauer Rosenberg (Allegheny, Pennsylvania)
- "Women as Wage-Workers, with Special Reference to Directing Immigrants," Julia Richman (New York City)
- "Influence of the Jewish Religion in the Home," Mary Matilda Cohen (Philadelphia, Pennsylvania)
- "Charity as Taught by the Mosaic Code," Eva H. Stern (New York)
- "Woman's Place in Charitable Work; What It Is, and What It Should Be," Carrie Shevelson Benjamin (Denver, Colorado)
- "How Can Nations be Influenced to Protest or Even Interfere in Cases of Persecution," Laura Davis Jacobson (Saint Louis, Missouri)
- "Organization," Sadie American (Chicago, Illinois)
- "The Outlook of Judaism," Josephine Lazarus (New York)
- "What Judaism has Done for Woman," Henrietta Szold (Baltimore, Maryland)

== See also ==
- First World Congress of Jewish Women, Vienna, 1923

== Bibliography ==
- Jewish Publication Society of America (1894). Papers of the Jewish Women's Congress: Held at Chicago, September 4, 5, 6 and 7, 1893. Jewish Publication Society of America.
- Jewish Social Service (1917). Jewish Social Service. Vol. 8.
