= Esenwein =

Esenwein is a surname. Notable people with the surname include:

- Joseph Berg Esenwein (1867–1946), American editor, lecturer, and writer
- Peter Esenwein (born 1967), German javelin thrower

== See also ==
- Esenwein & Johnson, architectural firm of Buffalo, New York
