= Lippincott's Monthly Magazine =

American literary magazine (1868–1916)

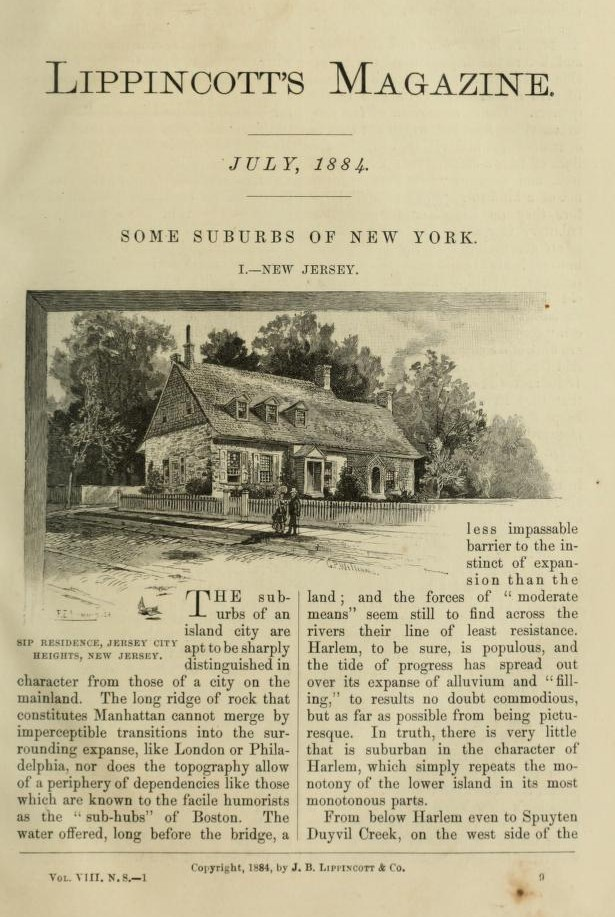
- One page of the issue dated July 1884, apparently as Vol. VIII, No. 8
- Frequency: Monthly
- First issue: 1868
- Final issue: 1916
- Company: J. B. Lippincott & Co. (to 1914)
- Country: United States
- Based in: Philadelphia
- Language: English

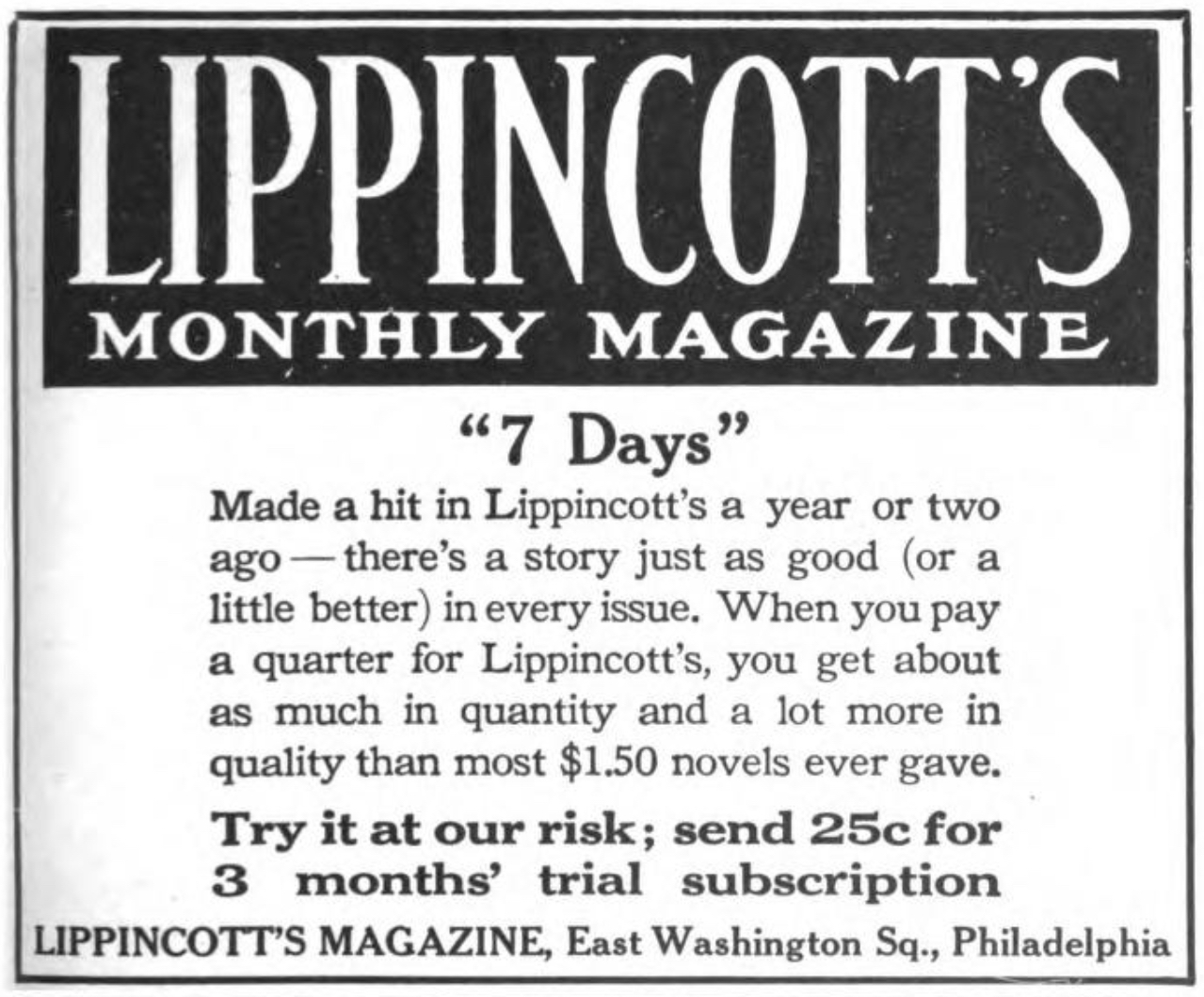
Lippincott's Monthly Magazine advertisement in The Black Cat of April 1912

Lippincott's Monthly Magazine was a 19th-century literary magazine published in Philadelphia from 1868 to 1915, when it moved to New York to become McBride's Magazine. It merged with Scribner's Magazine in 1916.

Lippincott's published original works, general articles, and literary criticism. It was published by J. B. Lippincott of Philadelphia until 1914, then by McBride, Nast & Co. There were 96 semi-annual volumes. From 1881 to 1885 they were issued as vols. 1 to 10 "New Series" or "N.S." (see image) and bound such as "Old Series, Vol. XXVII – New Series, Vol. I" (January to June 1881) but the old series was resumed with January 1887 issued as volume 37, number 1.

The magazine is indexed in the Reader's Guide Retrospective database. The full text of many issues is available online from Project Gutenberg, and in various commercial databases such as the American Periodicals Series from ProQuest.

== Early names ==
- 1868–1870: Lippincott's Magazine of Literature, Science and Education
- 1871–1885: Lippincott's Magazine of Popular Literature and Science

== Notable authors ==
Lippincott's published several notable authors of the day, including:

- Gertrude Atherton: Doomswoman (1892)
- Willa Cather
- Florence Earle Coates, Philadelphia poet whose poetry was featured nearly five dozen times in Lippincott's between 1885 and 1915.
- Arthur Conan Doyle: The Sign of the Four (February 1890)
- Paul Laurence Dunbar: The Sport of the Gods (1901)
- Rudyard Kipling: The Light that Failed (January 1891)
- Emma Lazarus (over 40 poems in the 1870s)
- Louis Sullivan: The Tall Office Building Artistically Considered (1896)
- Anthony Trollope: The Vicar of Bullhampton (serialized starting in July 1869)
- Oscar Wilde: The Picture of Dorian Gray (July 1890)

== Cover art for Lippincott's magazine ==
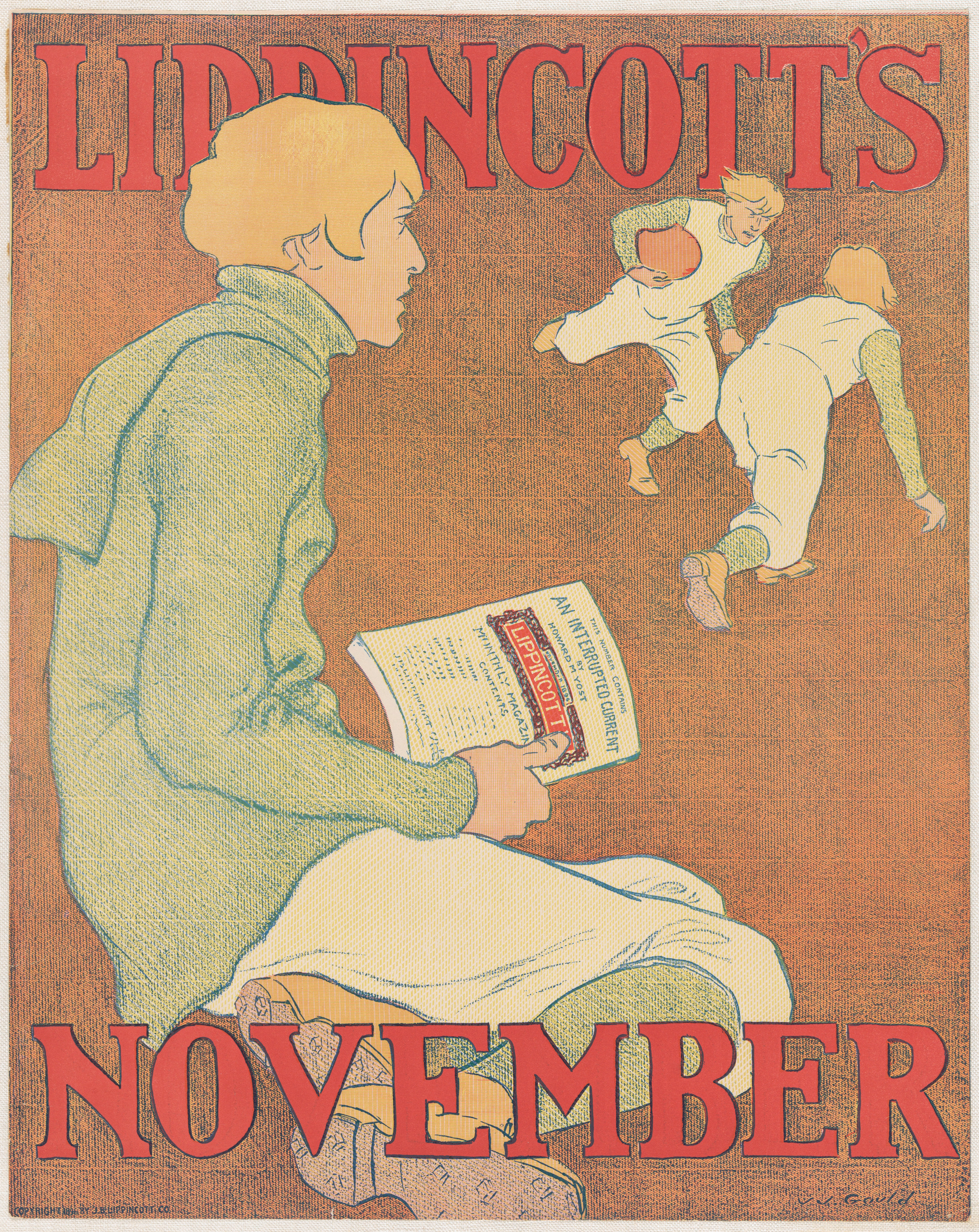
Lippincott's- November MET

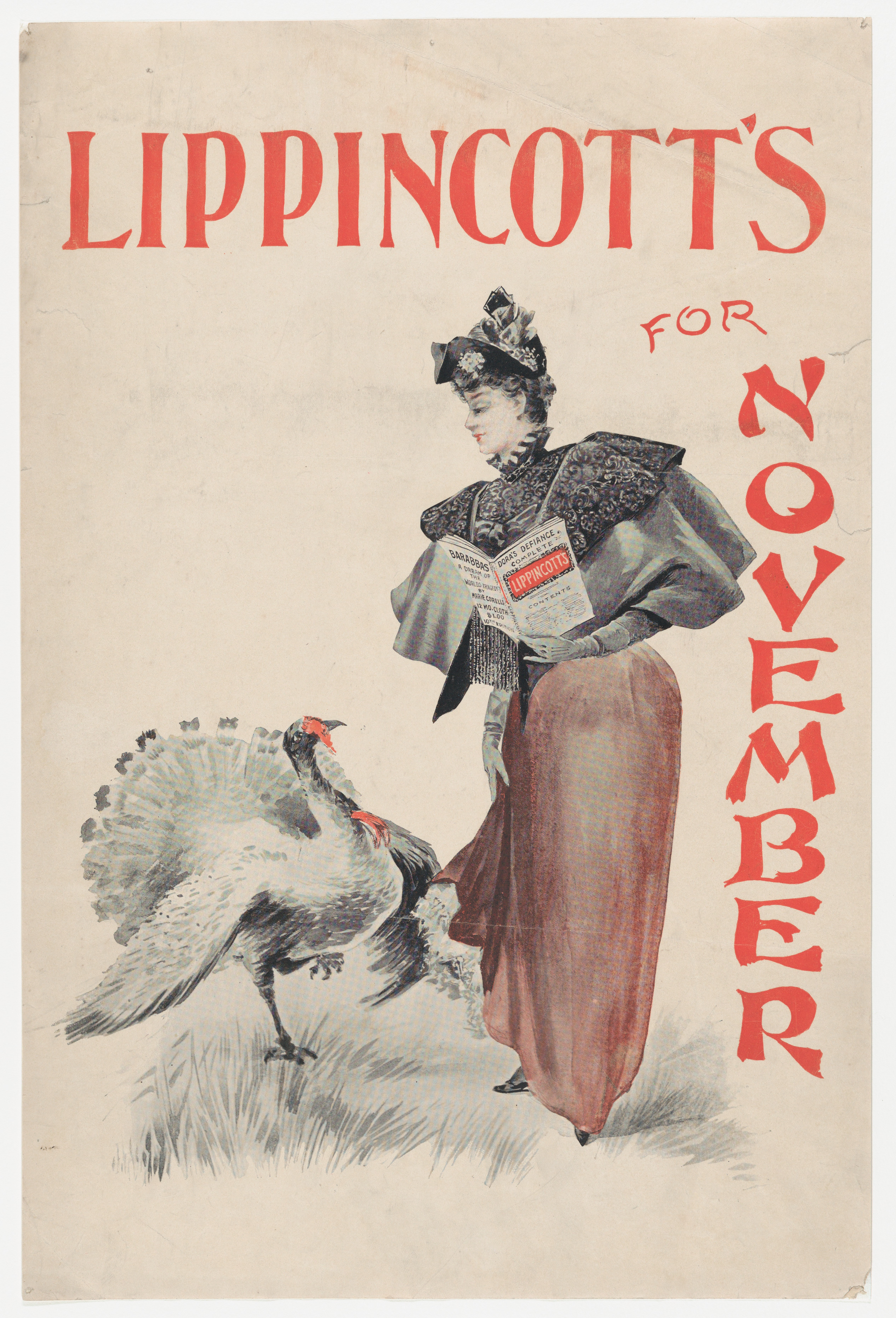
Lippincott's- November MET

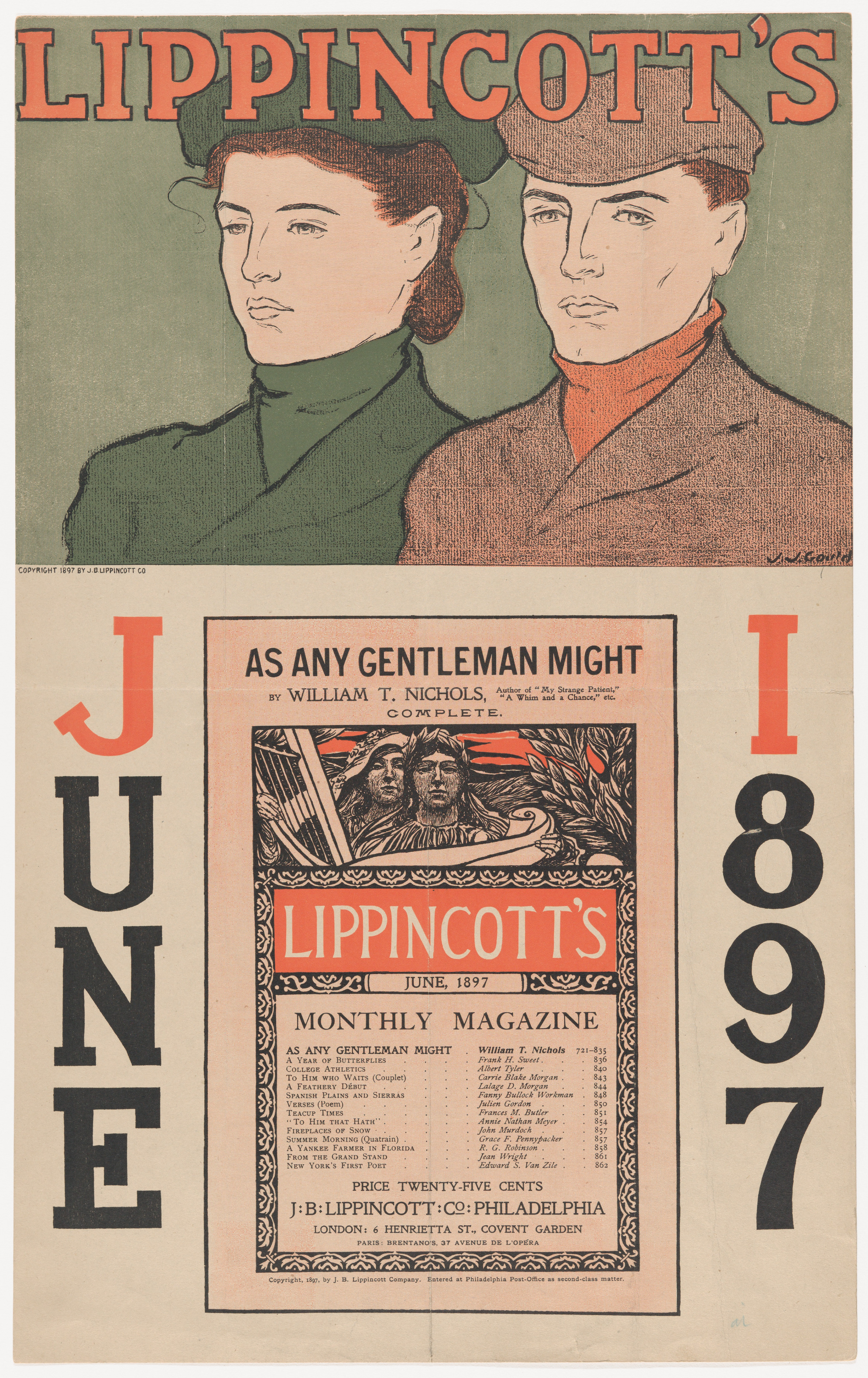
Lippincott's- June MET

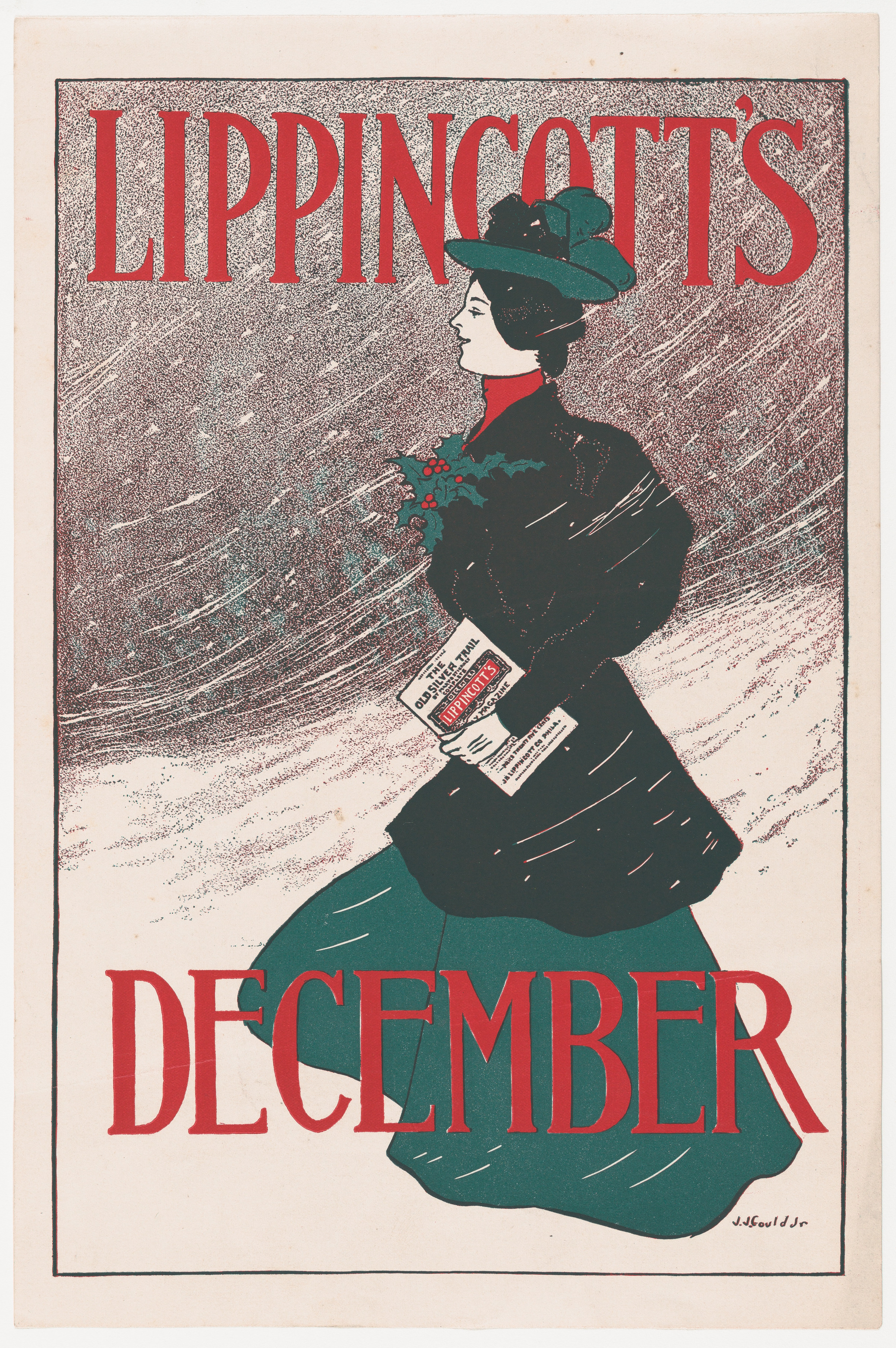
Lippincott's, December MET

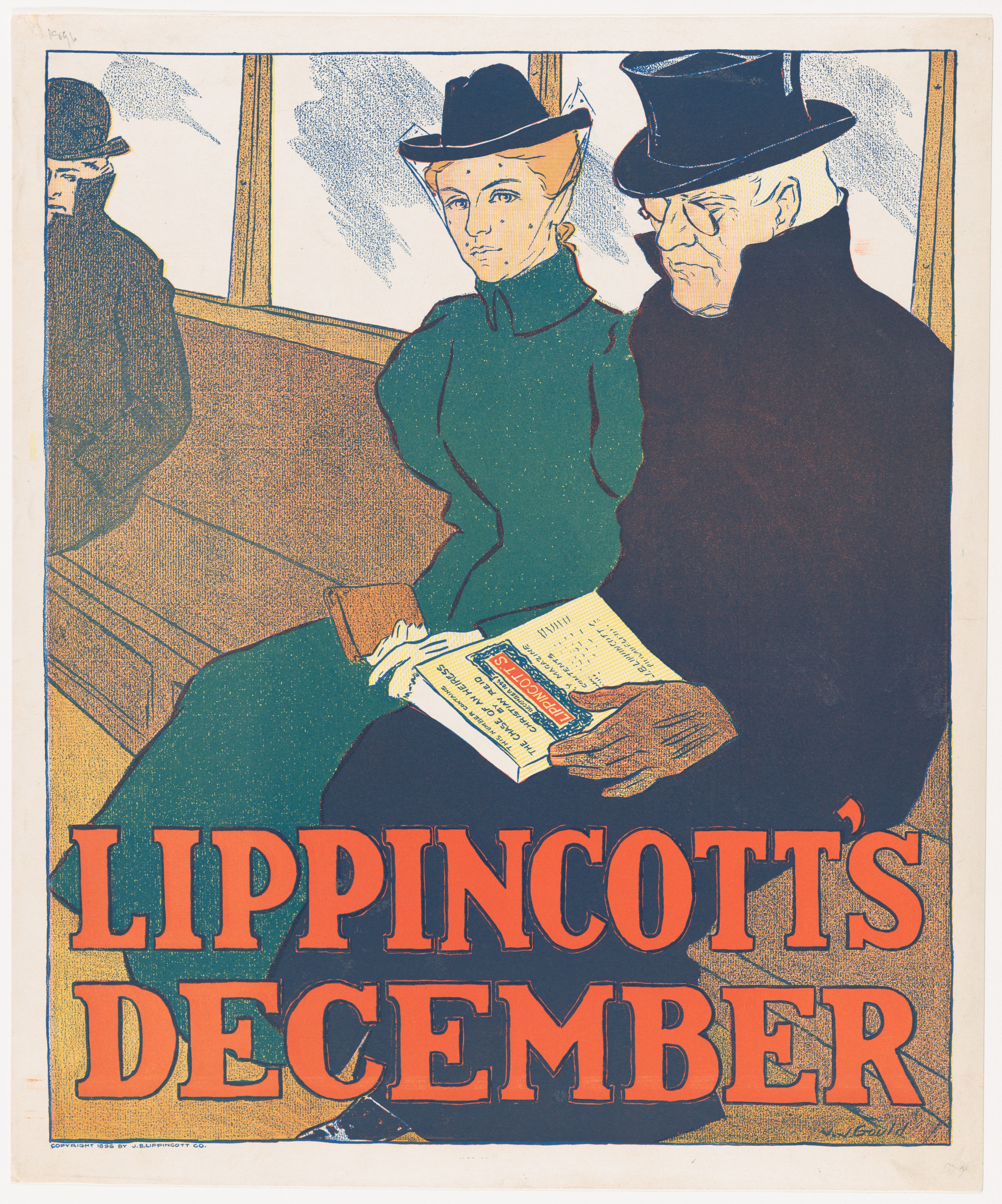
Lippincott's- December MET

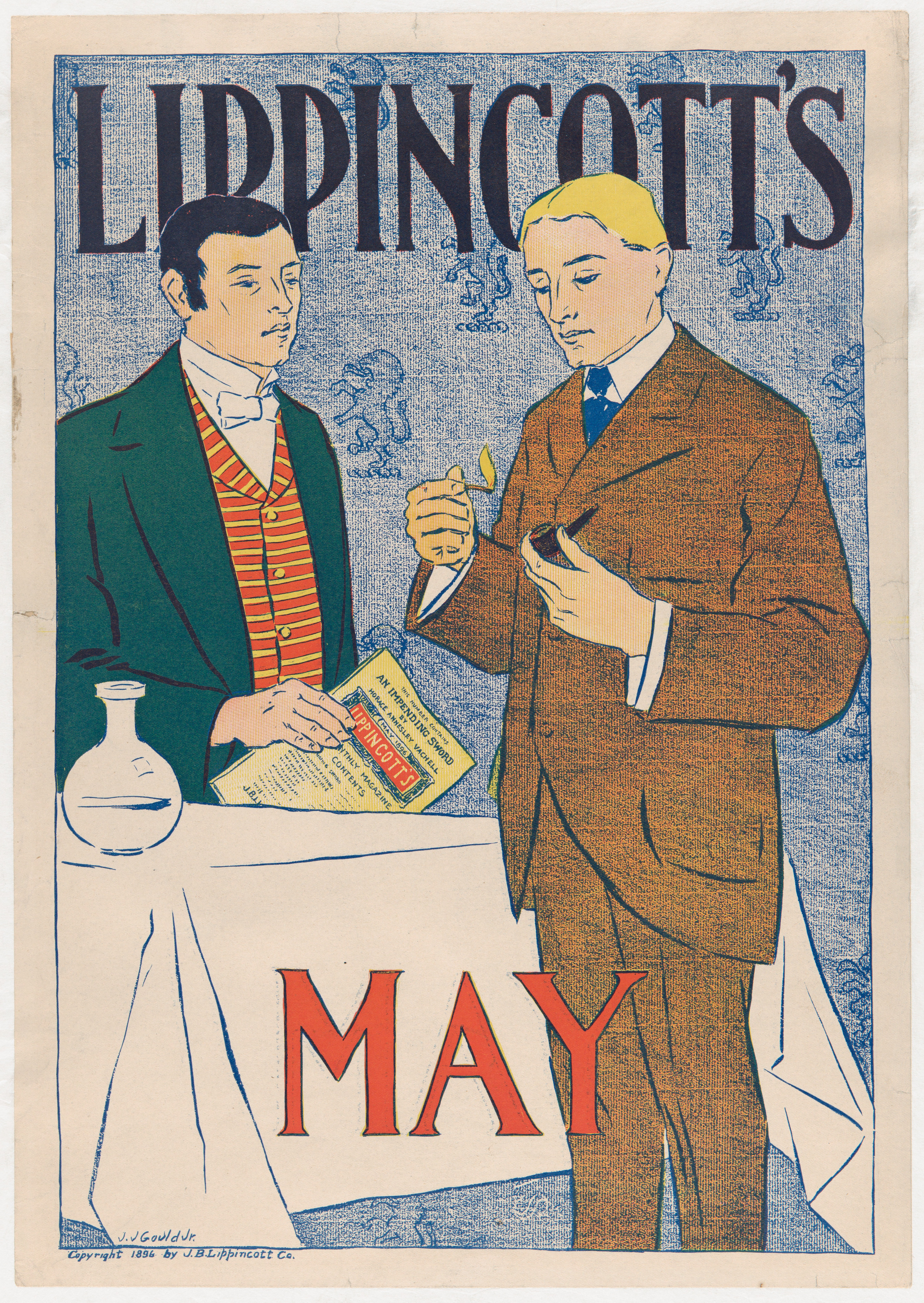
Lippincott's- May MET

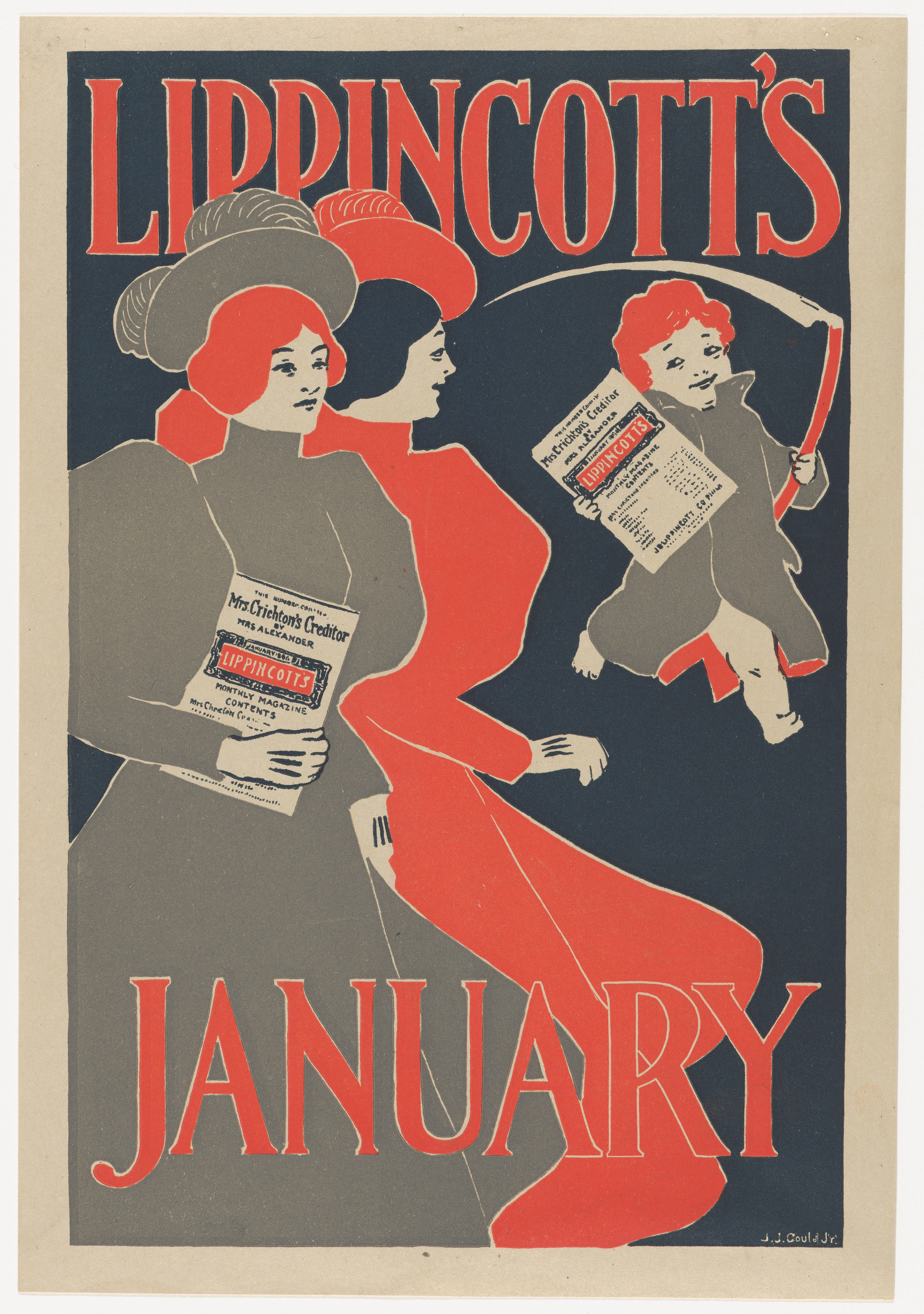
Lippincott's- January MET

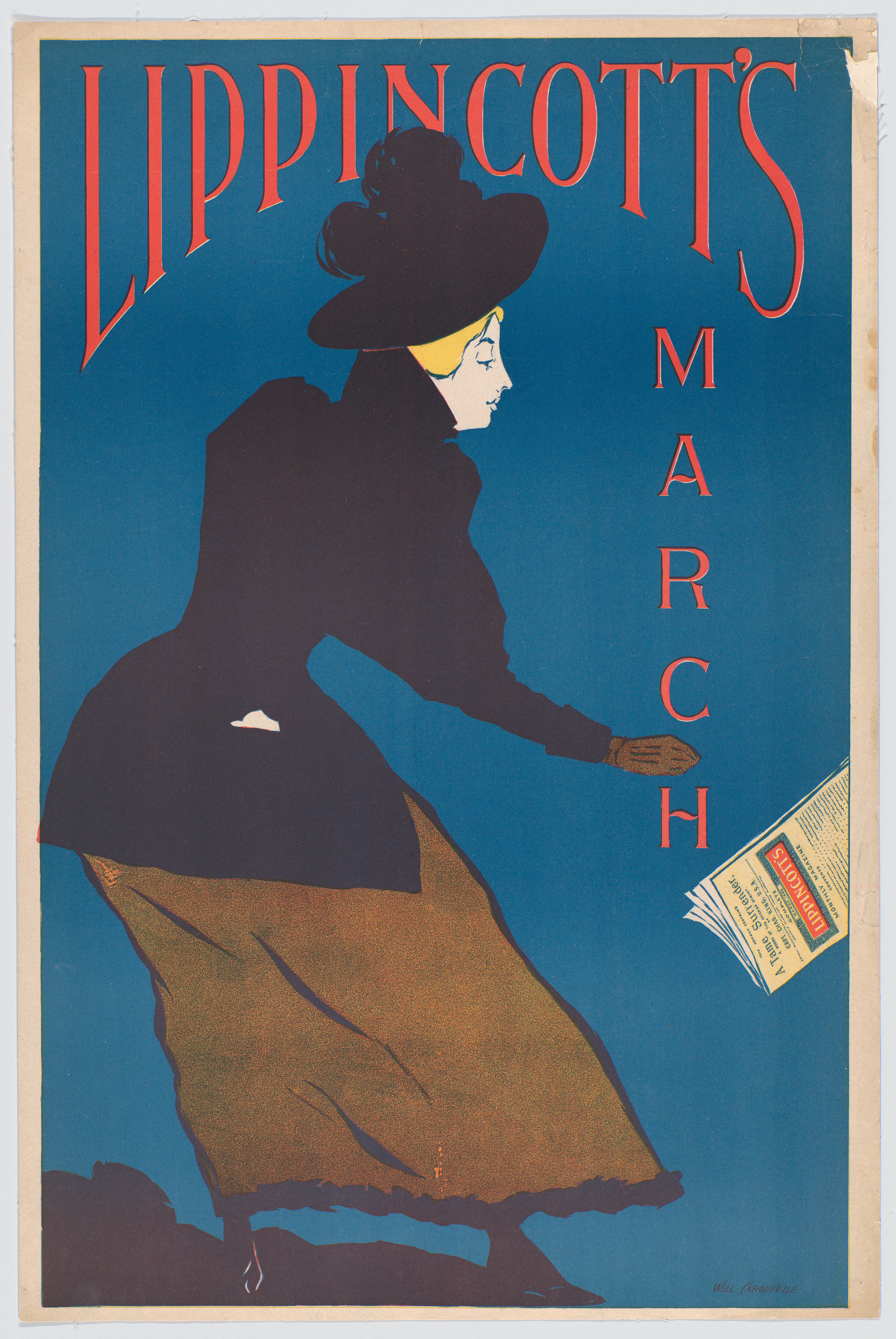
Lippincott's, March MET

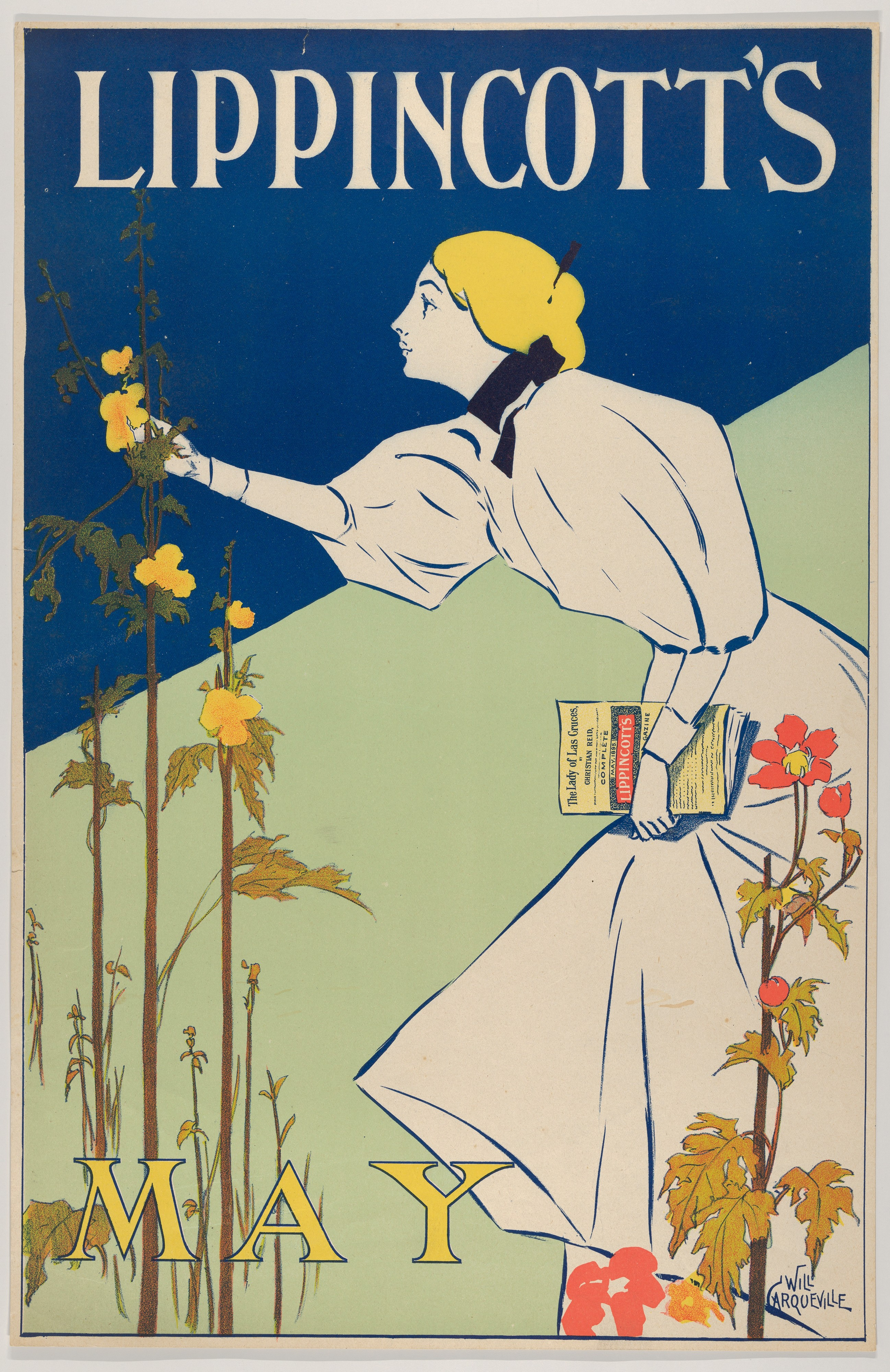
Lippincott's, May MET

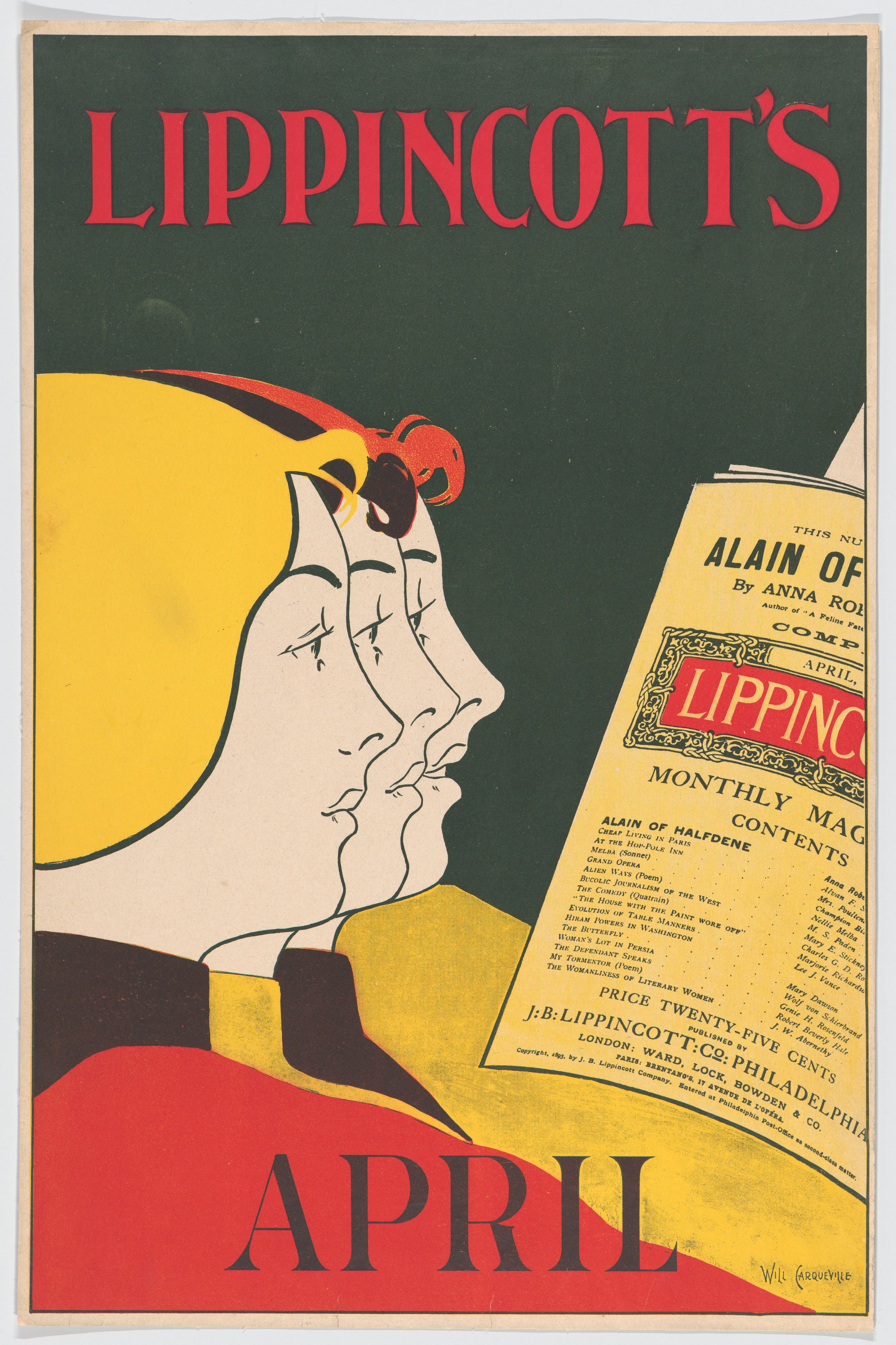
Lippincott's, April MET

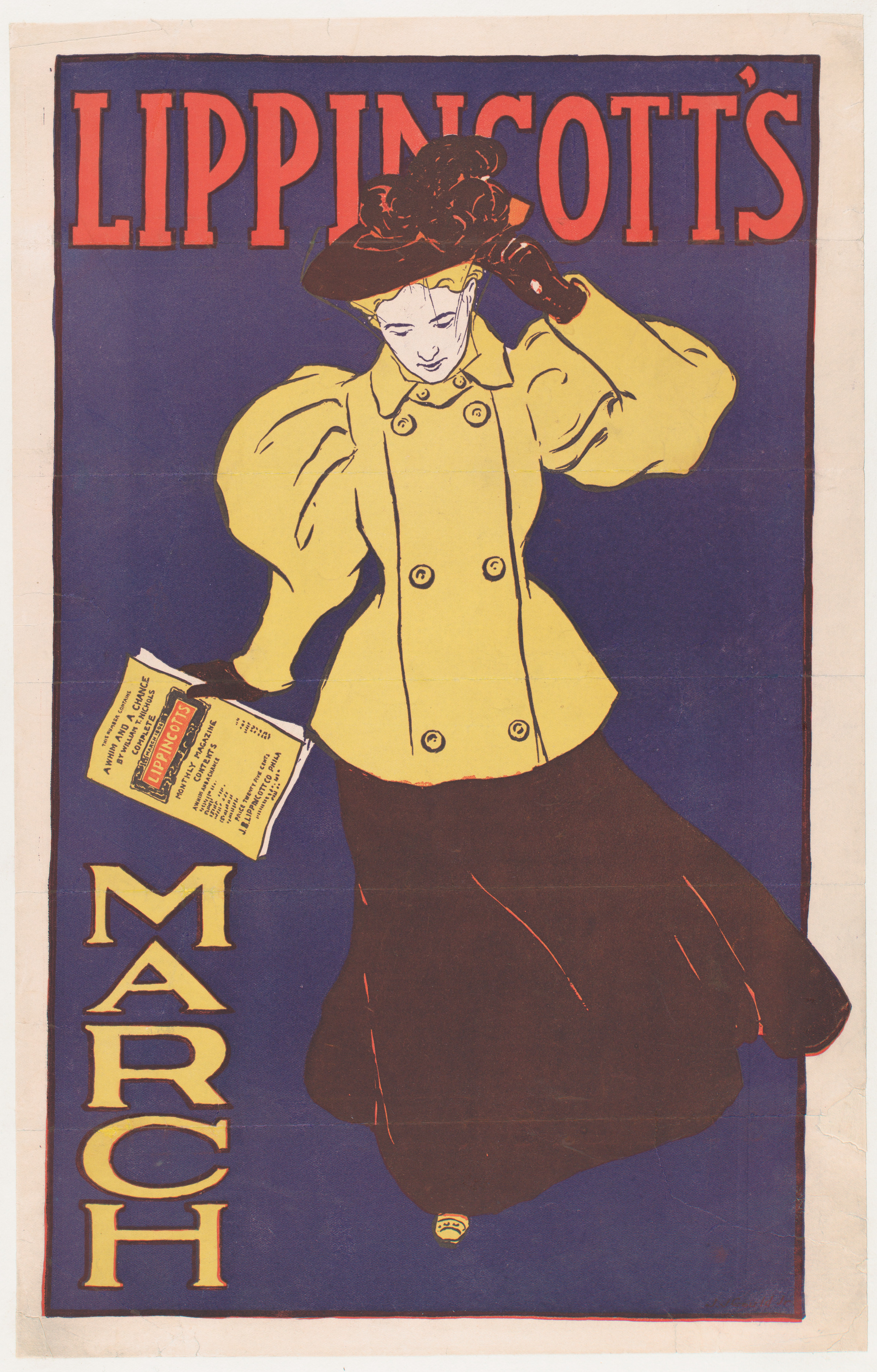
Lippincott's- March MET

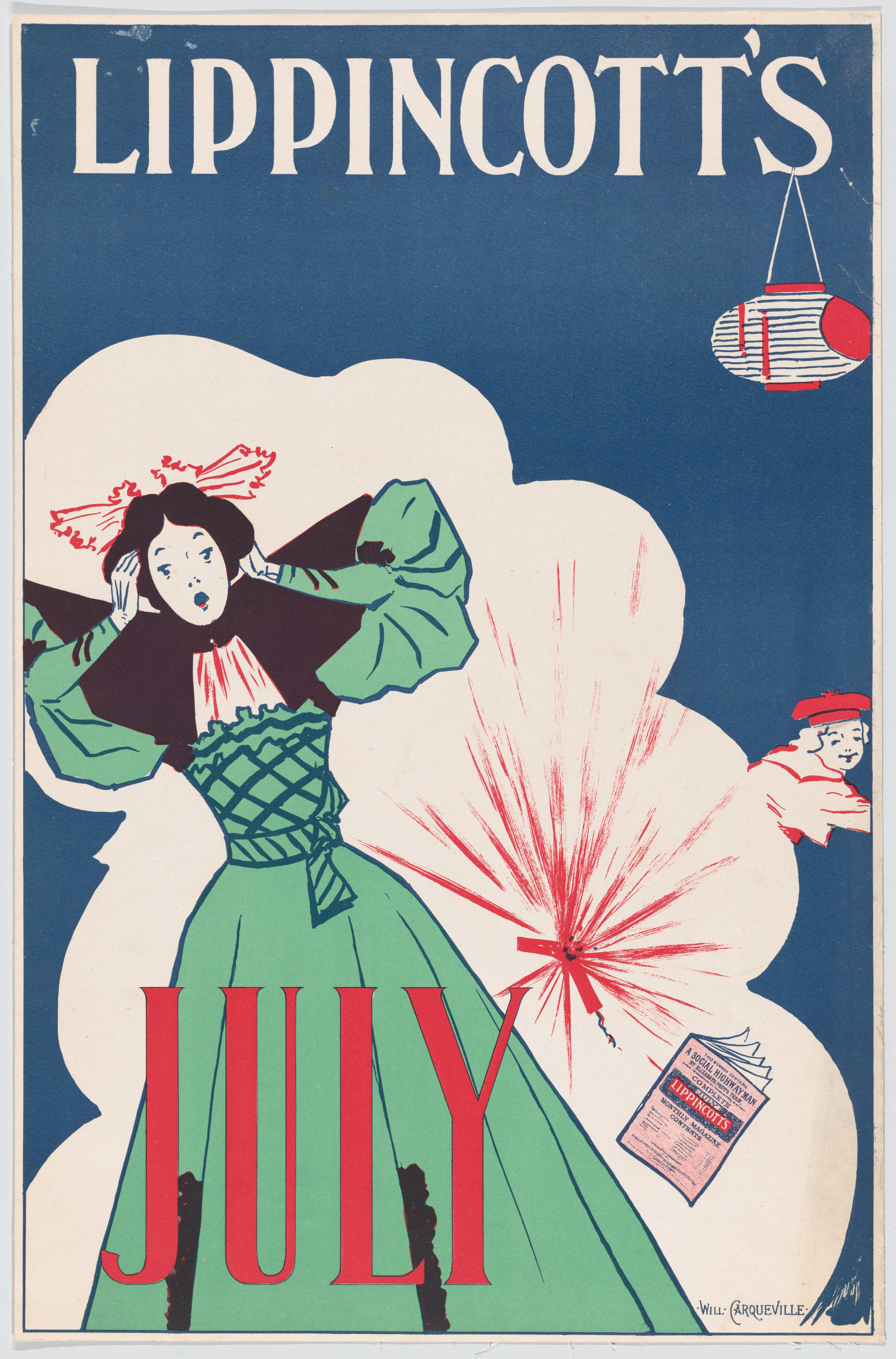
Lippincott's- July MET

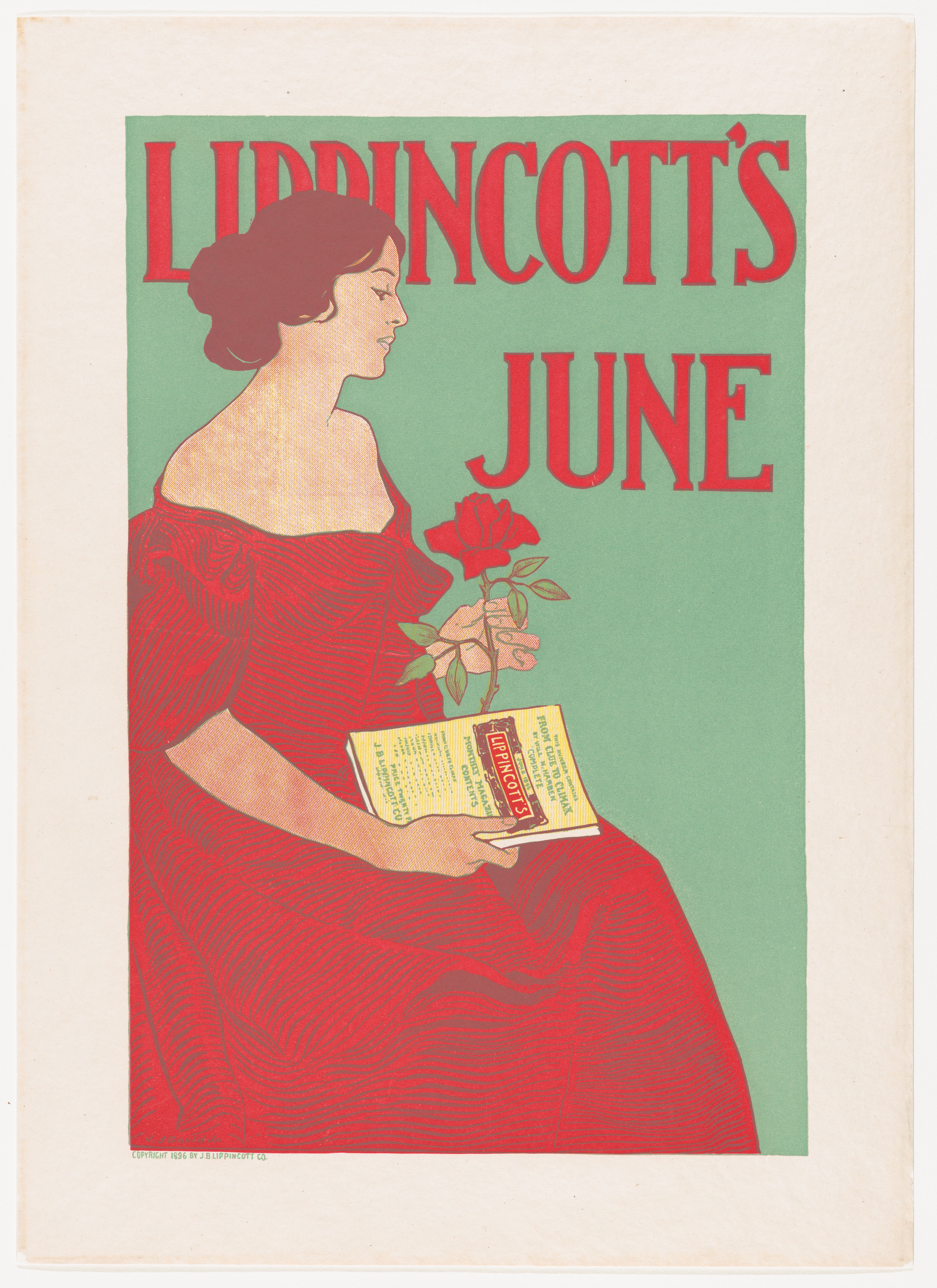
Lippincott's- June MET

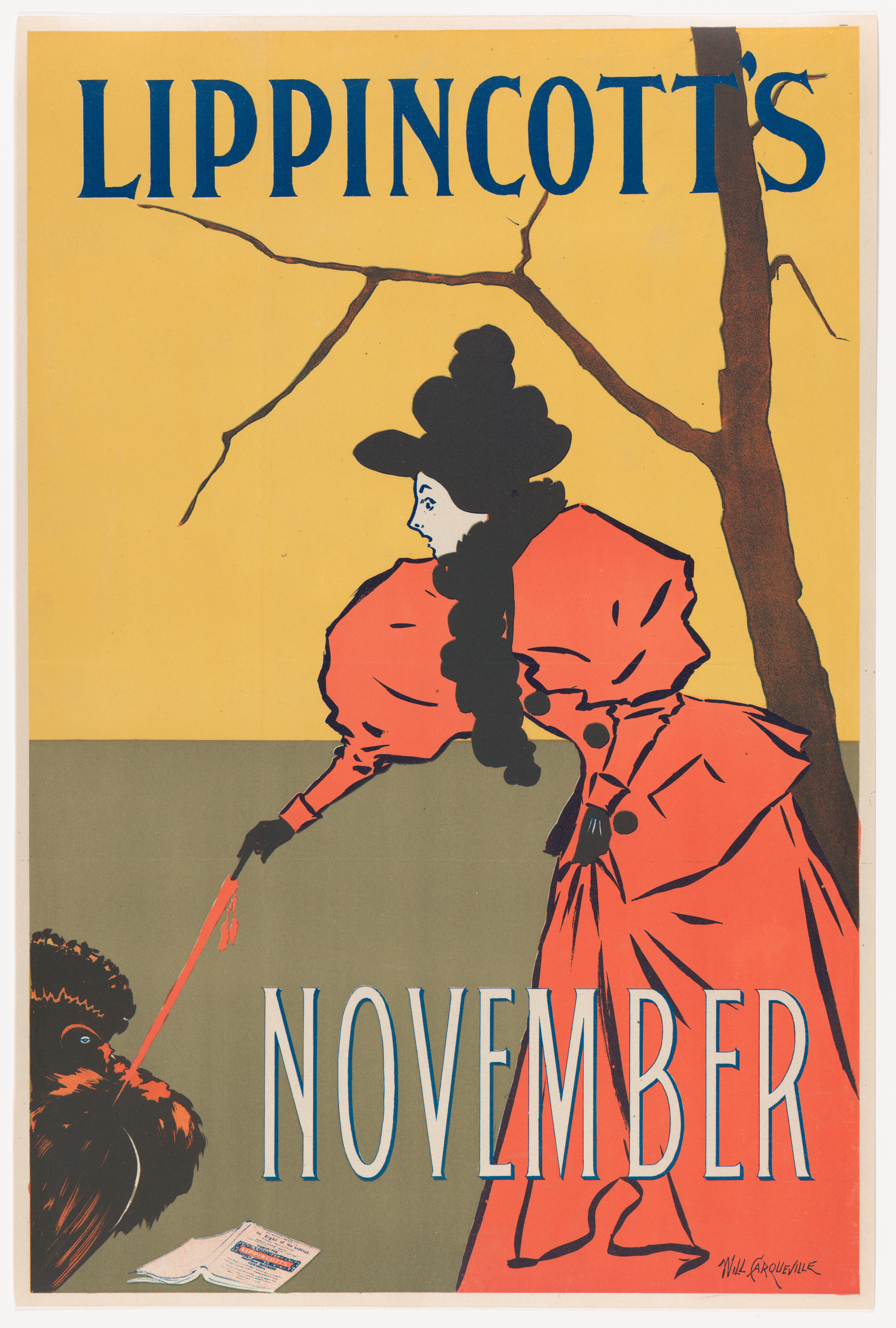
Lippincott's- November MET

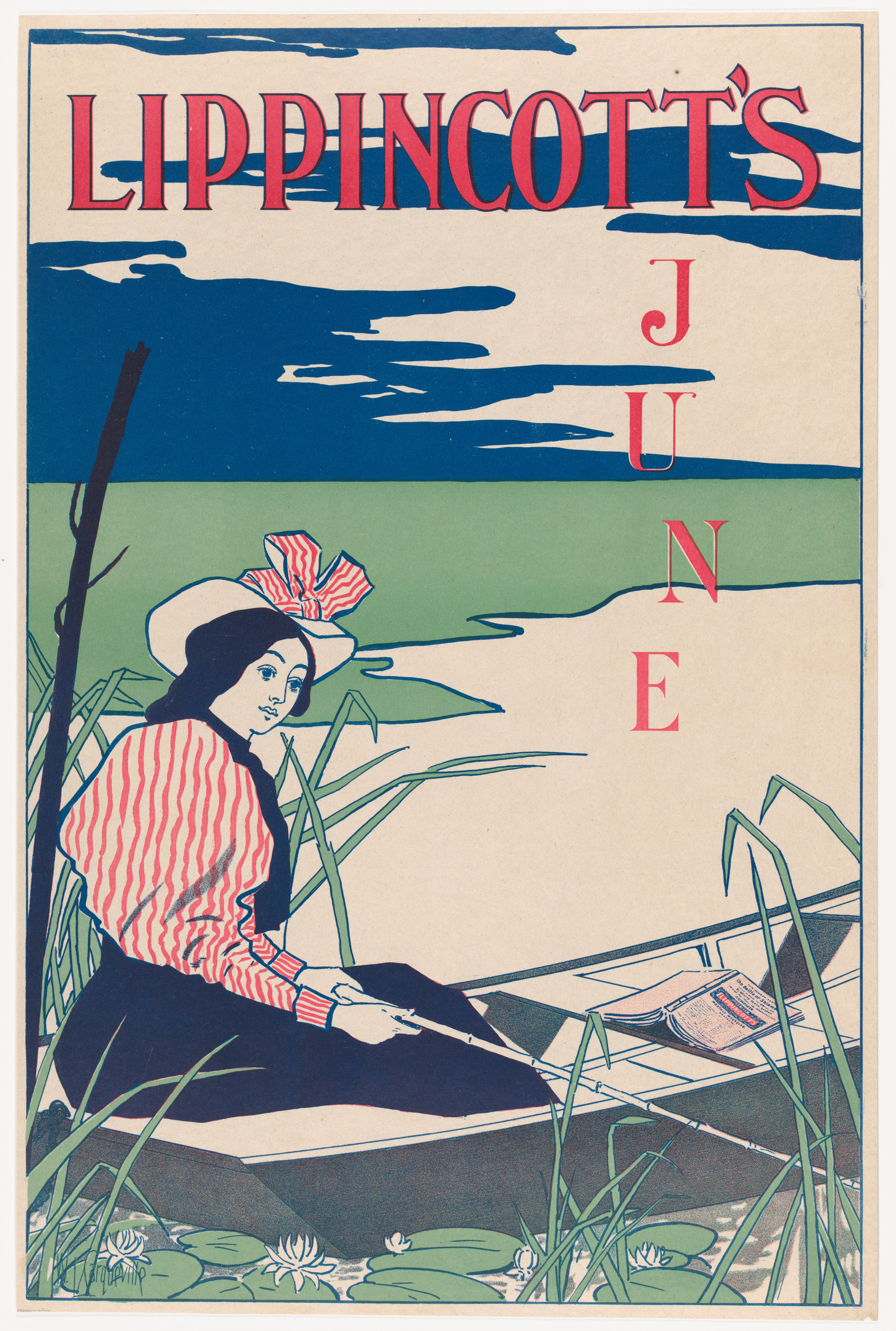
Lippincott's- June MET

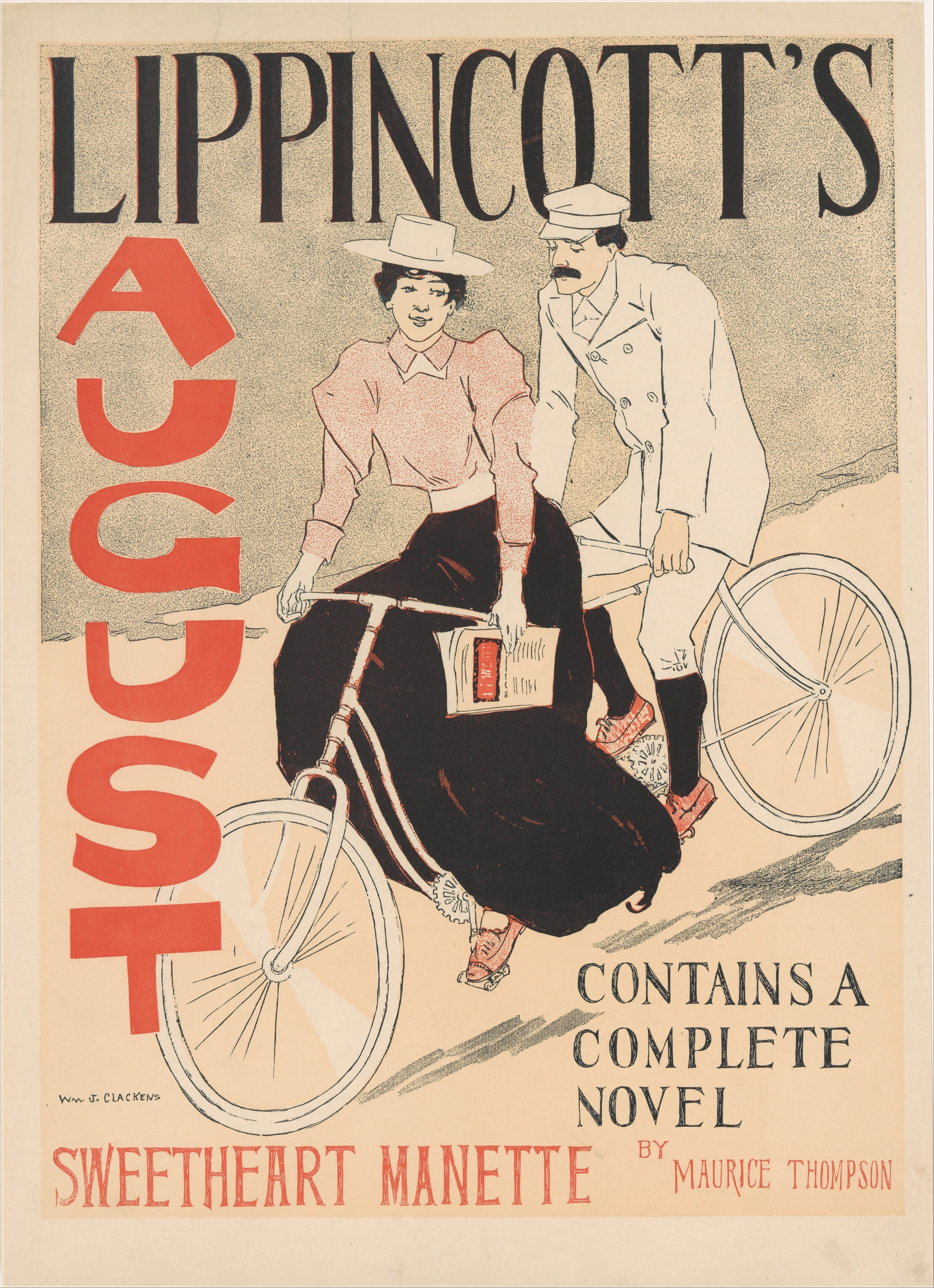
Lippincott's- August MET

== Notable editors ==
- 1886–1894: Joseph Marshall Stoddart
- 1905-1914: Joseph Berg Esenwein
