= Josephine Lazarus =

American essayist, book critic, transcendentalist and Zionist

Josephine Lazarus

Josephine Lazarus (23 March 1846 - 1910) was an American essayist, book critic, transcendentalist, and Zionist.

== Biography ==
Lazarus was born March 23, 1846, in New York City, the daughter of Moses and Esther (Nathan) Lazarus. The first piece of work to bring her into prominent notice was the biographical sketch of her sister, Emma Lazarus, which first appeared in The Century Magazine, October, 1888, and was afterward prefixed to “The Poems of Emma Lazarus” (New York and Boston, 1889). Between 1890 and 1893 she wrote articles on Marie Bashkirtseff in Scribner's Magazine and on Louisa May Alcott and Margaret Fuller in The Century Magazine. In 1895, six of her essays on Jewish subjects, which had appeared from 1892 to 1895 in The Century Magazine and The Jewish Messenger were collected and published in book form under the title The Spirit of Judaism. The plea addressed to Jews in these essays was to acquire a larger knowledge of the Jewish situation, to emerge from their spiritual isolation, and to enter into fellowship with those among whom they live; and the plea addressed to Christians was for a more liberal attitude toward Jews and Jewish thought.

Lazarus was a featured speaker at the Jewish Women’s Congress in conjunction with the World's Columbian Exposition of 1893 with her essay, "The Outlook of Judaism". Between 1897 and 1902 Lazarus wrote, in The American Hebrew, The New World, and The Maccabaean four articles on aspects of the Zionist movement, with which she was in sympathy. Besides, she published, in 1899, a book entitled Madame Dreyfus; and for many years she was a contributor of numerous book-notices to The Critic.
