= Gershom Mendes Seixas =

American Jewish religious leader

Reverend Gershom Mendes Seixas
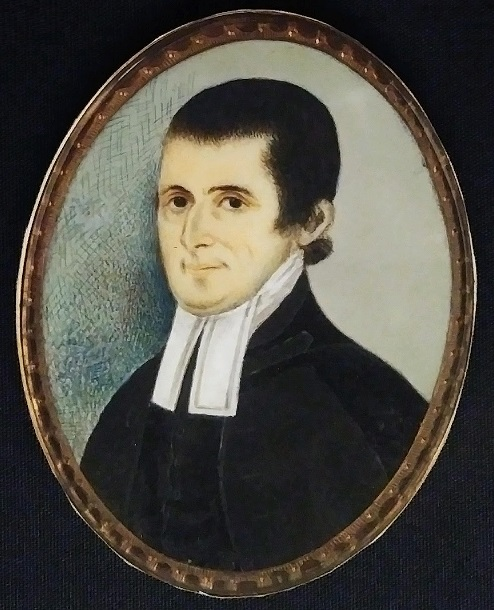
- Seixas, c. 1785
- Born: January 15, 1745
- Died: July 2, 1816 (aged 71)
- Occupation: Hazzan of Congregation Shearith Israel
- Spouses: Elchalah Cohen (m. 1775; died 1785) Hannah Manuel (m. 1789)
- Children: 15, including David Seixas
- Father: Isaac Mendes Seixas
- Relatives: Grace Seixas Nathan (sister)

Gershom Mendes Seixas (January 15, 1745 – July 2, 1816) was the first native-born Jewish religious leader in the United States. He served as the hazzan of Congregation Shearith Israel, New York City's first Spanish and Portuguese synagogue, for about five decades. The first American Jewish clergyman to deliver sermons in English, Mendes Seixas became known for his civic activities as well as his defense of religious liberty, participating in the inauguration of President George Washington and helping found Columbia College (previously King's College), the oldest part of New York City's Columbia University.

== Personal life ==
Gershom's father, Isaac Mendes Seixas (1709-1780), was a Sephardic merchant born in Lisbon, Portugal, who first emigrated to Barbados before coming to the British colonies, living in New York City around 1730 and moving to Newport, Rhode Island, around 1765. He married Rachel Levy, who bore seven children, including Gershom and his sister Grace.

Isaac Mendes Seixas signed the Non-Importation Agreement Act, one of a series of acts of resistance which led to the American Revolutionary War. His eldest brother, Moses Mendes Seixas (1744–1809), a merchant, helped organize the Bank of Rhode Island in 1796, became the president of the historic Touro Synagogue in Newport, Rhode Island, and led the congregation's welcome for President George Washington. His younger brother Abraham Mendes Seixas (1751–1799), was an officer in the Continental Army. Another brother, Benjamin Mendes Seixas (1748–1817), was one of the founders of the New York Stock Exchange.

Seixas married Elchalah Cohen (1749–85) in 1775. After her death, he married Hannah Manuel in 1789. In all, he had fifteen children, of whom the most famous would be David Seixas, who established the Pennsylvania Institution for the Deaf and Dumb in Philadelphia, and was among the first to discover efficient ways of burning anthracite coal.

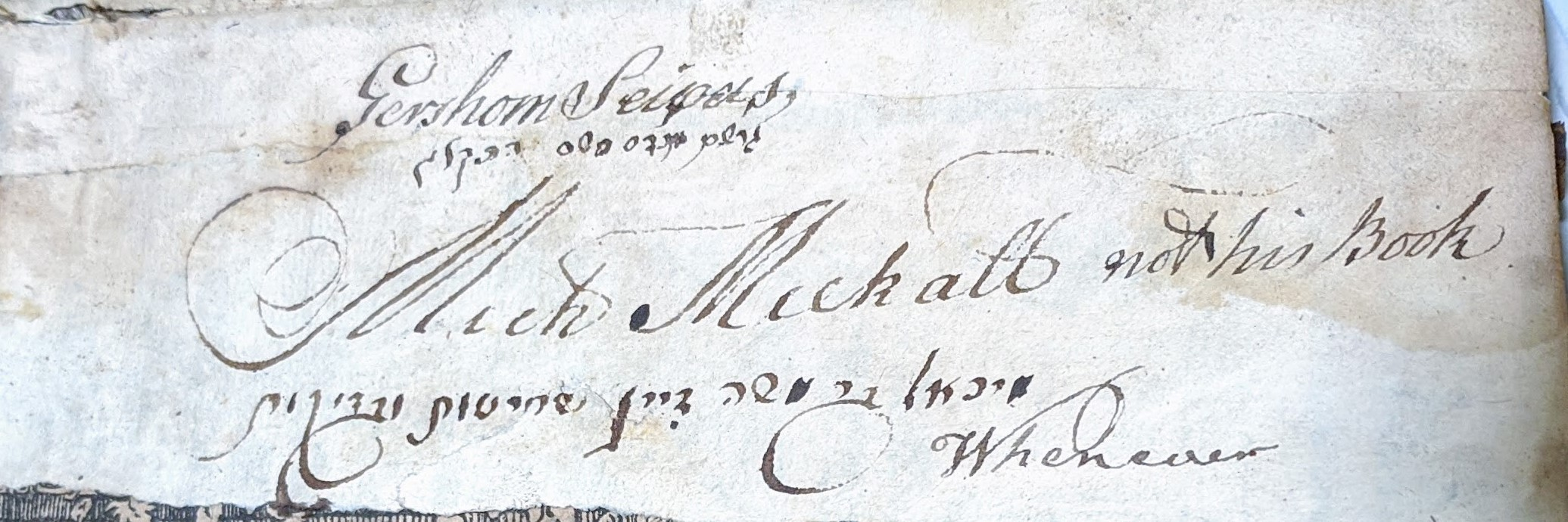
Gershom Mendes Seixas' signatures in Hebrew and English, above the signatures of a predecessor (Michael Michaels); Penn Libraries BM522 .W45 1702.

== Career ==
In 1766, Gershom Mendes Seixas became the leader of Shearith Israel, New York City's first and oldest Spanish and Portuguese Sephardi congregation, and remained its minister for about a half century. Although not ordained as a rabbi, Seixas served as hazzan and religious leader to the congregation and was among the first leaders of the Jewish community who had been born and educated in the United States. As the British fleet approached New York Bay in August, 1776, Seixas preached an emotional sermon in English, warning that that day's services might be the last held in the historic edifice. His Patriot loyalties provoked Shearith Israel to seal its entrance as the British approached, and Mendes Seixas left New York rather than remain under British rule. He rescued the scrolls of the Law and other ceremonial items as he fled for Stratford, Connecticut, where several members of the congregation joined him. In 1780, patriots who had fled to Philadelphia wanted to establish the city's first permanent congregation and selected Mendes Seixas to officiate. He thus helped establish historic Congregation Mikveh Israel. Many important politicians attended the synagogue's dedication, including the governor of Pennsylvania, and Seixas invoked "the blessings of Almighty God on the Members of these States in Congress assembled and on his Excellency George Washington, Commander-General of these Colonies".

While living in Philadelphia, Mendes Seixas zealously defended religious liberty. He and several members of his congregation addressed the Commonwealth of Pennsylvania's Council of Censors in December 1783, opposing the adoption of a religious test for prospective office holders. He characterized these as "unjust to the members of a persuasion that had always been attached to the American cause and given a support to the country, some in the Continental army, some in the militia, and some by cheerfully paying taxes and sustaining the popular cause."

Mendes Seixas returned to New York on March 23, 1784, and resumed his former position at the reopened Shearith Israel. He was one of the first ministers to preach a regular Thanksgiving Day sermon. He was also among the fourteen clergymen honored to be chosen to participate in George Washington's 1789 inauguration ceremony as president of the United States. In 1787 Seixas became the first member of his faith to be elected a trustee of Columbia College, the oldest part of today's Columbia University in New York City and remained such until 1815. He was also one of the College's incorporators. In 1802, he helped found "Hebra Hased Ve Amet", charitable organization. He served on the Board of Regents of what became New York University and as a trustee of the Humane Society of New York.

Mendes Seixas enjoyed the friendship of many religious leaders (although before the Revolutionary War, many held Tory sympathies) and frequently was asked to speak to Christian congregations. He later supported the War of 1812 as well as aid to those suffering from those hostilities.

== Death ==
Gershom Mendes Seixas died on July 2, 1816, at the age of 70, and was buried in his congregation's first cemetery, then in the Bowery, now in Chinatown. Gershom was mourned by his sister, Grace Seixas Nathan, who wore mourning clothes up to five years after his death.

== Legacy ==
A memorial sermon delivered by Emanuel Nunes Carvalho of Congregation Mikveh Israel and printed in Philadelphia became the first Jewish sermon published in the United States. Congregation Shearith Israel prominently displays a tablet in Seixas's honor. Today, members of the Seixas family are leaders of the American Sephardi community.

One of his descendants was Everett Seixas, a combat soldier in the 80th Infantry Division of the United States Army during World War II who was killed in action in the Battle of the Bulge.

== Works cited ==
- Joseph Heckelman, The First Jews in the New World, Jay Street Publishers, 2004.
- David Pool and Naomi De Sola, An Old Faith in the New World, Columbia University Press, 1954.
