= Emma Lazarus =

American poet (1849–1887)

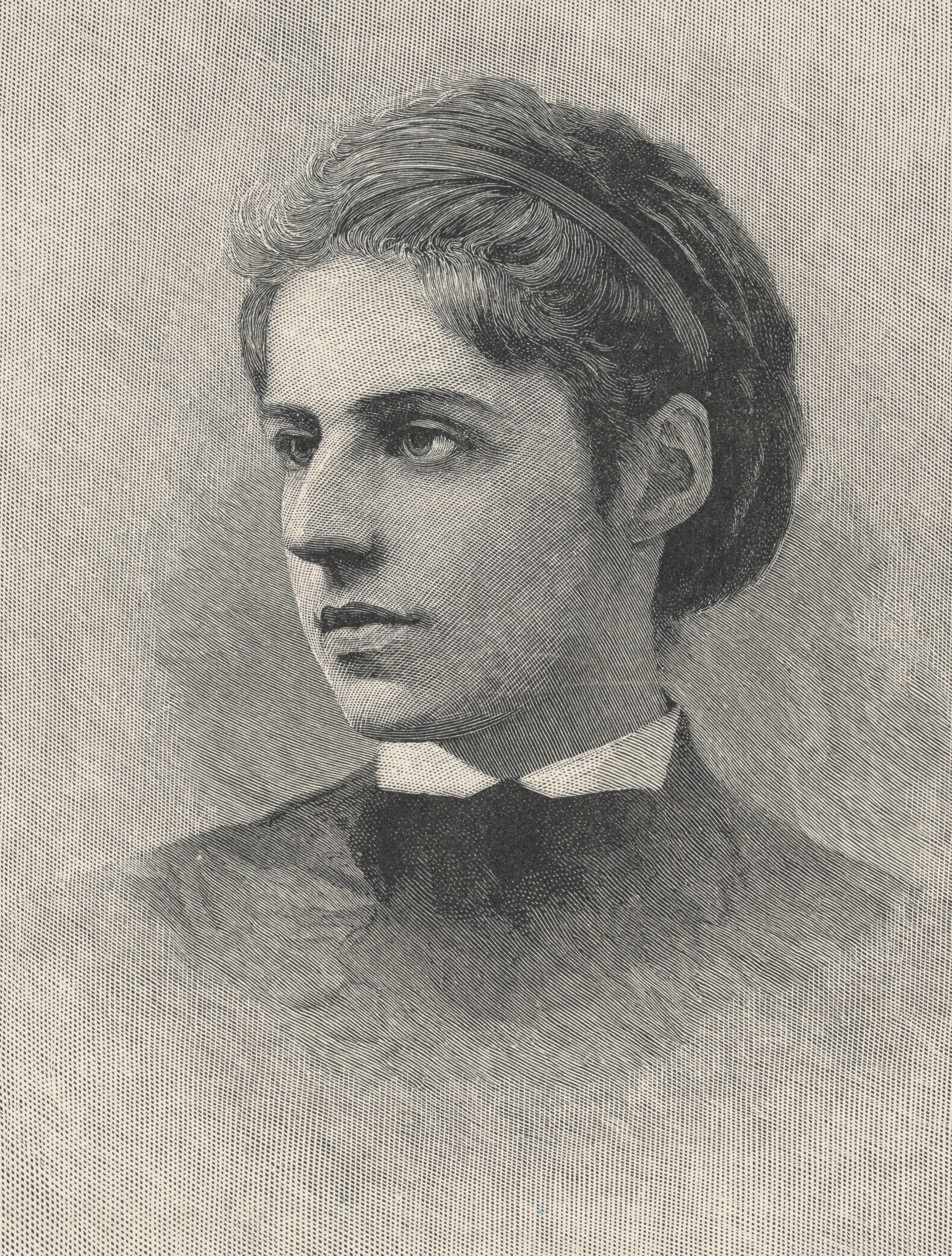
- Lazarus, c. 1872
- Born: July 22, 1849; New York City, New York, U.S.
- Died: November 19, 1887 (aged 38); New York City
- Resting place: Beth Olam Cemetery in Brooklyn, New York City
- Occupations: Author, activist
- Relatives: Josephine Lazarus, Benjamin N. Cardozo
- Writing career
- Language: English
- Genres: Poetry, prose, translations, novels, plays
- Subject: Georgism
- Notable work: "The New Colossus"
- Notable awards: National Women's Hall of Fame

Signature
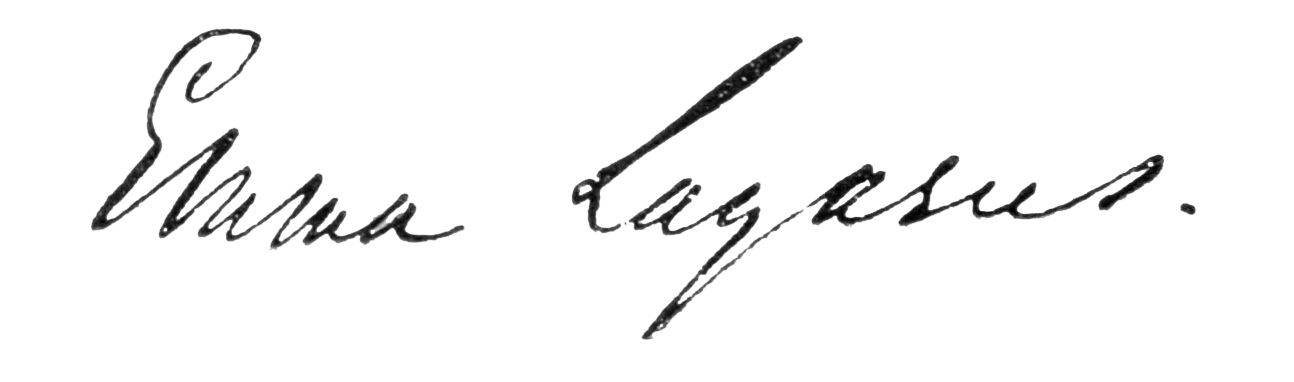

Emma Lazarus (July 22, 1849 – November 19, 1887) was an American author of poetry, prose, and translations, as well as an activist for Jewish and Georgist causes. Lazarus is especially remembered for her 1883 sonnet, "The New Colossus", which was inspired by the Statue of Liberty. Lines from the sonnet are inscribed on a bronze plaque which was installed on the Statue's pedestal in 1903. Lazarus was involved in aiding refugees to New York who had fled antisemitic pogroms in eastern Europe, and she saw a way to express her empathy for these refugees in terms of the statue. The last lines of the sonnet were set to music by Irving Berlin as the song "Give Me Your Tired, Your Poor" for the 1949 musical Miss Liberty, which was based on the sculpting of the Statue of Liberty (Liberty Enlightening the World). The latter part of the sonnet was also set by Lee Hoiby in his song "The Lady of the Harbor" written in 1985 as part of his song cycle "Three Women".

Lazarus was also the author of Poems and Translations (New York, 1867); Admetus, and other Poems (1871); Alide: An Episode of Goethe's Life (Philadelphia, 1874); Poems and Ballads of Heine (New York, 1881); Poems, 2 Vols.; Narrative, Lyric and Dramatic; as well as Jewish Poems and Translations.

== Early years and education ==
Emma Lazarus was born in New York City, July 22, 1849, into a large Jewish family. She was the fourth of seven children of Moses Lazarus, a wealthy merchant and sugar refiner, and Esther Nathan (of a long-established German-Jewish New York family). Her siblings included sisters Josephine, Sarah, Mary, Agnes and Annie, and a brother, Frank.

One of Emma's paternal great-grandfathers was from Germany; the rest of her Lazarus ancestors were originally from Portugal, and were among the first 23 Portuguese Jews who arrived in New Amsterdam after they fled Recife, Brazil to escape from the Portuguese Inquisition. Her maternal great-great-grandmother, Grace Seixas Nathan (born in Stratford, Connecticut in 1752) was also a poet. Lazarus was related through her mother to Supreme Court Justice Benjamin N. Cardozo.

Privately educated by tutors from an early age, Lazarus studied American and British literature, as well as several foreign languages, including German, French, and Italian. She was attracted to poetry in her youth, writing her first lyrics when she was eleven years old.

== Career ==
=== Writer ===
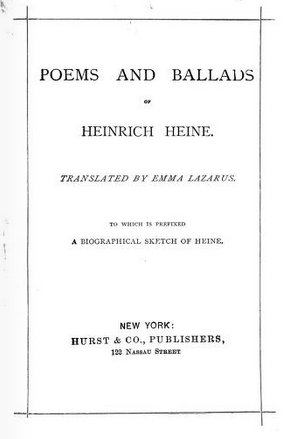
Poems and ballads of Heinrich Heine

The first stimulus for Lazarus's writing was offered by the American Civil War. A collection of her Poems and Translations, verses written between the ages of fourteen and seventeen, appeared in 1867 (New York), and was commended by William Cullen Bryant. It included translations from Friedrich Schiller, Heinrich Heine, Alexandre Dumas, and Victor Hugo. Admetus and Other Poems followed in 1871. The title poem was dedicated "To my friend Ralph Waldo Emerson", whose works and personality were exercising an abiding influence upon the poet's intellectual growth. During the next decade, in which "Phantasies" and "Epochs" were written, her poems appeared chiefly in Lippincott's Monthly Magazine and Scribner's Monthly.

By this time, Lazarus's work had won recognition abroad. Her first prose production, Alide: An Episode of Goethe's Life, a romance treating of the Friederike Brion incident, was published in 1874 (Philadelphia), and was followed by The Spagnoletto (1876), a tragedy. Poems and Ballads of Heinrich Heine (New York, 1881) followed, and was prefixed by a biographical sketch of Heine; Lazarus's renderings of some of Heine's verse are considered among the best in English. In the same year, 1881, she became friends with Rose Hawthorne Lathrop. In April 1882, Lazarus published in The Century Magazine the article "Was the Earl of Beaconsfield a Representative Jew?" Her statement of the reasons for answering this question in the affirmative may be taken to close what may be termed the Hellenic and journeyman period of Lazarus's life, during which her subjects were drawn from classic and romantic sources.

Lazarus also wrote The Crowing of the Red Cock, and the sixteen-part cycle poem "Epochs". In addition to writing her own poems, Lazarus edited many adaptations of German poems, notably those of Johann Wolfgang von Goethe and Heinrich Heine. She also wrote a novel and two plays in five acts, The Spagnoletto, a tragic verse drama about the titular figure and The Dance to Death, a dramatization of a German short story about the burning of Jews in Nordhausen during the Black Death. During the time Lazarus became interested in her Jewish roots, she continued her purely literary and critical work in magazines with such articles as "Tommaso Salvini", "Salvini's 'King Lear'", "Emerson's Personality", "Heine, the Poet", "A Day in Surrey with William Morris", and others.

The New Colossus

Not like the brazen giant of Greek fame,
With conquering limbs astride from land to land;
Here at our sea-washed, sunset gates shall stand
A mighty woman with a torch, whose flame
Is the imprisoned lightning, and her name
Mother of Exiles. From her beacon-hand
Glows world-wide welcome; her mild eyes command
The air-bridged harbor that twin cities frame.
"Keep, ancient lands, your storied pomp!" cries she
With silent lips. "Give me your tired, your poor,
Your huddled masses yearning to breathe free,
The wretched refuse of your teeming shore.
Send these, the homeless, tempest-tost to me,
I lift my lamp beside the golden door!" (1883)

Lines from her sonnet "The New Colossus" appear on a bronze plaque which was placed in the pedestal of the Statue of Liberty in 1903. The sonnet was written in 1883 and donated to an auction, conducted by the "Art Loan Fund Exhibition in Aid of the Bartholdi Pedestal Fund for the Statue of Liberty" in order to raise funds to build the pedestal. (Note: Auction event named as "Lowell says poem gave the statue "a raison d'être'"; fell into obscurity; not mentioned at statue opening; Georgina Schuyler's campaign for the plaque.) (Note: Solicited by "William Maxwell Evert" [sic; presumably William Maxwell Evarts] Lazarus refused initially; convinced by Constance Cary Harrison) Lazarus's close friend Rose Hawthorne Lathrop was inspired by "The New Colossus" to found the Dominican Sisters of Hawthorne.

She traveled twice to Europe, first in 1883 and again from 1885 to 1887. On one of those trips, Georgiana Burne-Jones, the wife of the Pre-Raphaelite painter Edward Burne-Jones, introduced her to William Morris at her home. She also met with Henry James, Robert Browning and Thomas Huxley during her European travels. A collection of Poems in Prose (1887) was her last book. Her Complete Poems with a Memoir appeared in 1888, at Boston.

=== Activism ===
Lazarus was a friend and admirer of the American political economist Henry George. She believed deeply in Georgist economic reforms and became active in the "single tax" movement for land value tax. Lazarus published a poem in the New York Times named after George's book, Progress and Poverty.

Lazarus became more interested in her Jewish ancestry as she heard of the Russian pogroms that followed the assassination of Tsar Alexander II in 1881. As a result of this antisemitic violence, and the poor standard of living in Russia in general, thousands of destitute Ashkenazi Jews emigrated from the Russian Pale of Settlement to New York. Lazarus began to advocate on behalf of indigent Jewish immigrants. She helped establish the Hebrew Technical Institute in New York to provide vocational training to assist destitute Jewish immigrants to become self-supporting. Lazarus volunteered as well in the Hebrew Emigrant Aid Society employment bureau, although she eventually criticized its organization. In 1883, she founded the Society for the Improvement and Colonization of East European Jews.

The literary fruits of identification with her religion were poems like "The Crowing of the Red Cock", "The Banner of the Jew", "The Choice", "The New Ezekiel", "The Dance to Death" (a strong, though unequally executed drama), and her last published work (March 1887), "By the Waters of Babylon: Little Poems in Prose", which constituted her strongest claim to a foremost rank in American literature. During the same period (1882–87), Lazarus translated the Hebrew poets of medieval Spain with the aid of the German versions of Michael Sachs and Abraham Geiger, and wrote articles, signed and unsigned, upon Jewish subjects for the Jewish press, besides essays on "Bar Kochba", "Henry Wadsworth Longfellow", "M. Renan and the Jews", and others for Jewish literary associations. Several of her translations from medieval Hebrew writers found a place in the ritual of American synagogues.

Lazarus's most notable series of articles was titled "An Epistle to the Hebrews" (The American Hebrew, November 10, 1882 – February 24, 1883), in which she discussed the Jewish problems of the day, urged a technical and a Jewish education for Jews, and ranged herself among the advocates of an independent Jewish nationality and of Jewish repatriation in Palestine. Some scholars consider her to be one of the forerunners of Zionism. The only collection of poems issued during this period was Songs of a Semite: The Dance to Death and Other Poems (New York, 1882), dedicated to the memory of George Eliot.

== Death and legacy ==
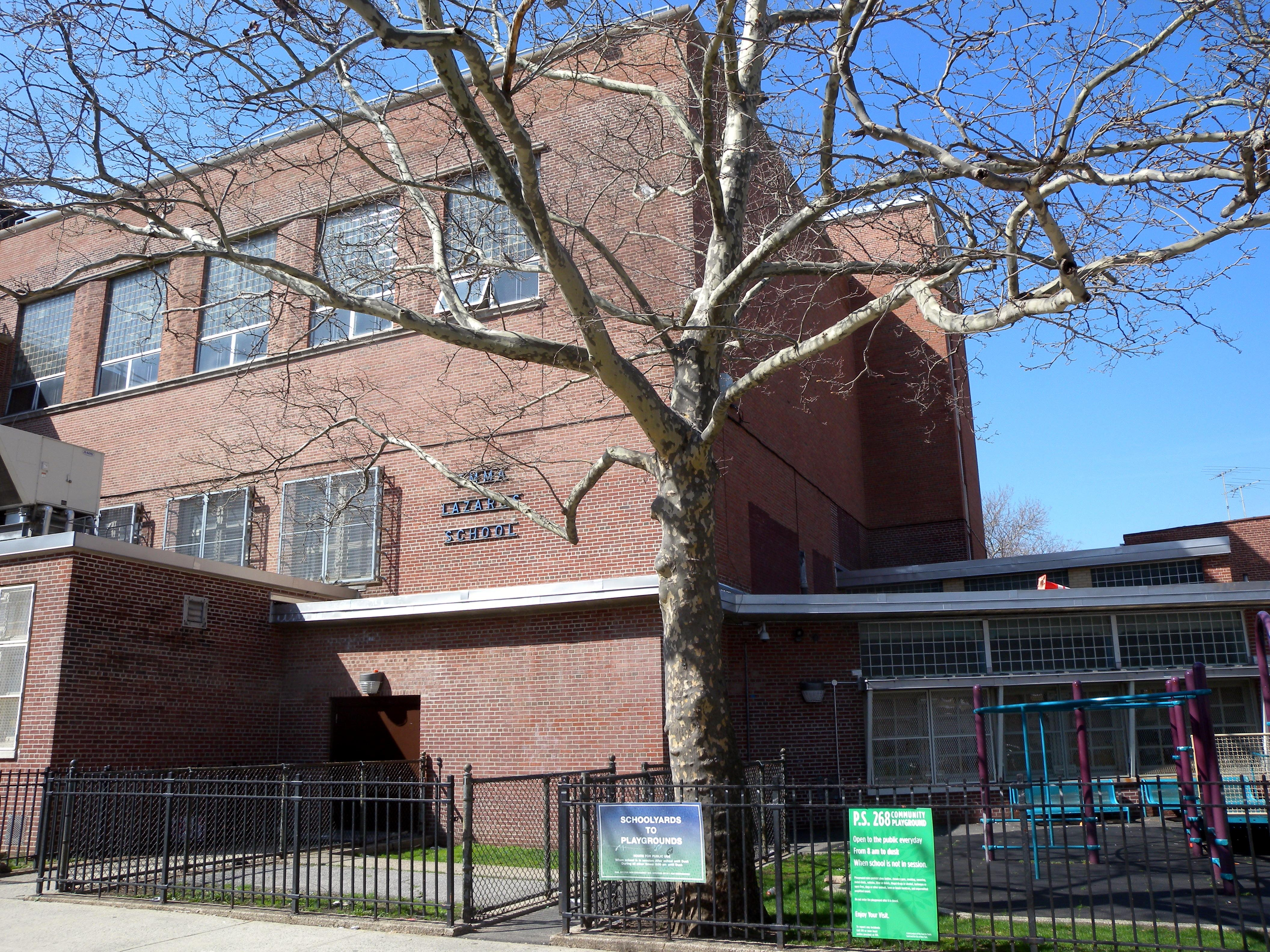
Lazarus Public School, Brooklyn

Lazarus returned to New York City seriously ill after she completed her second trip to Europe, and she died two months later, on November 19, 1887, most likely from Hodgkin's lymphoma. She never married. Lazarus was buried in Beth Olam Cemetery in Cypress Hills, Brooklyn. The Poems of Emma Lazarus (2 vols., Boston and New York, 1889) was published after her death, comprising most of her poetic work from previous collections, periodical publications, and some of the literary heritage which her executors deemed appropriate to preserve for posterity. Her papers are kept by the American Jewish Historical Society, Center for Jewish History, and her letters are collected at Columbia University.

The Emma Lazarus Federation of Jewish Women's Clubs, founded in 1951, was named after Lazarus.

A stamp featuring the Statue of Liberty and Lazarus's poem "The New Colossus" was issued by Antigua and Barbuda in 1985. In 1992, she was named as a Women's History Month Honoree by the National Women's History Project. Lazarus was honored by the Office of the Manhattan Borough President in March 2008, and her home on West 10th Street was included on a map of Women's Rights Historic Sites. In 2009, she was inducted into the National Women's Hall of Fame. The Museum of Jewish Heritage featured an exhibition about Lazarus in 2012. The Emma Lazarus Art and Music Venue, as well as a park are named in her honor in Carrick, a neighborhood on the South Side of Pittsburgh.

== Style and themes ==
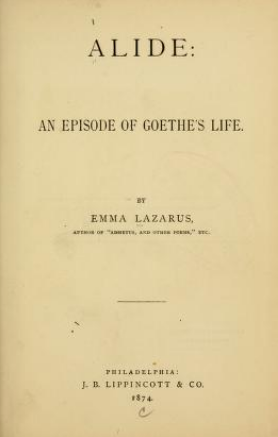
Alide: an episode of Goethe's life (1874)

Lazarus contributed toward shaping the self-image of the United States as well as how the country understands the needs of those who immigrated to the United States. Her themes produced sensitivity and enduring lessons regarding immigrants and their need for dignity. What was needed to make her a poet of the people as well as one of literary merit was a great theme, the establishment of instant communication between some stirring reality and her still hidden and irresolute subjectivity. Such a theme was provided by the immigration of Russian Jews to America, consequent upon the proscriptive May Laws of 1882. She rose to the defense of her ethnic compatriots in powerful articles, as contributions to The Century (May 1882 and February 1883). Hitherto, her life had held no Jewish inspiration. Though of Sephardic ancestry, and ostensibly Orthodox in belief, her family had till then not participated in the activities of the synagogue or of the Jewish community. Contact with the unfortunates from Russia led her to study the Torah, the Hebrew language, Judaism, and Jewish history. While her early poetry demonstrated no Jewish themes, her Songs of a Semite (1882) is considered to be the earliest volume of Jewish American poetry.

A review of Alide by Lippincott's Monthly Magazine was critical of Lazarus's style and elements of technique.
