= Grace Seixas Nathan =

American poet (1752–1831)

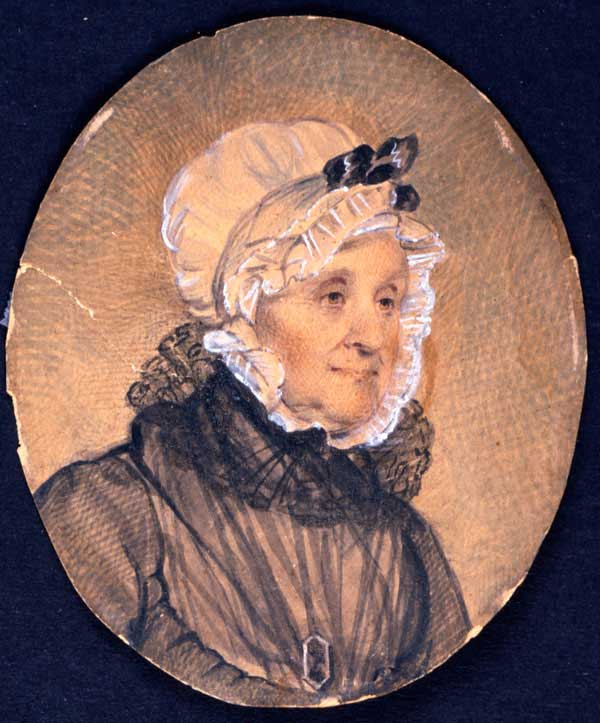
- portrait by Henry Inman
- Born: November 11, 1752; Stratford
- Died: November 8, 1831; New York
- Occupation: Writer
- Spouse: Simon Nathan
- Children: Seixas Isaac Mendes Nathan
- Relatives: Gershom Mendes Seixas, Moses Seixas

Grace Seixas Nathan (1752–November 8, 1831) was an American Jewish poet and a member of a prominent Western Sephardic family. Although her poetry was not published during her lifetime, her correspondences and poems have been published post-humously.

== Early life ==
Grace Seixas was born on November 11, 1752, in Stratford, Connecticut. According to some sources, she was born on November 24, 1752 in New York City. Seixas was the seventh child of Isaac Mendes Seixas, a Sephardic Jew, and Rachel Levy, an Ashkenazi Jew. Her father was from a converso family who fled Portugal in 1725 after being accused of being Crypto-Jews.

As a young girl, she enjoyed writing poetry. She had three brothers: Gershom, Benjamin, and Abraham, who were all active Patriots during the American Revolution. Gershom was the cantor for New York’s Congregation Shearith Israel.

== American Revolution ==
After the American Revolution began, Seixas' family moved from New York to Philadelphia, where she met Simon Nathan, a British Jewish merchant and a supporter of the American Revolution. In Philadelphia, Nathan served as president of Congregation Mikveh Israel and Gershom served as temporary cantor.

In 1780, she married Simon Nathan. The couple had one son, Isaac Mendes (born 1785–1852). After the war ended, they returned to New York City.

== Later life ==
In 1829, Seixas Nathan wrote “Reflections on Passing Our New Burial Ground" to honor the new Jewish cemetery Congregation Shearith Israel.

Despite being a prolific author, her poetry was never published in her lifetime.

Seixas Nathan maintained correspondences with many people, namely her niece Sarah Abigail Seixas. In these letters, Seixas Nathan discussed matters like the health of her family and the literature that interested her. In 1947, some of her correspondences were published by the American Jewish Historical Society.

Seixas Nathan died in New York City on November 8, 1831. She was the great-grandmother of poet Emma Lazarus, who would later write the poem on the Statue of Liberty.
