= Sadie American =

American social worker

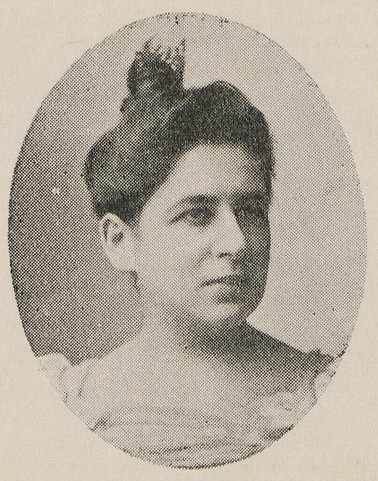
- Sadie American in 1899
- Born: March 3, 1862; Chicago
- Died: May 3, 1944 (aged 82); New York City
- Occupation: Social worker

Sadie American (March 3, 1862 – May 3, 1944) was a Jewish-American activist, social worker, and "Chicago's pioneer of visual sociology".

== Early years and education ==
Sadie American was born in Chicago, Illinois, on 3 March 1862, and educated its public schools.

== Career ==
American was secretary of the Congress of Jewish Women at the World's Fair in 1893. She was one of the founders of the Council of Jewish Women (1893), an organizer of many sections of this association, and its executive secretary in 1893. She was president of the New York section, Council of Jewish Women. She was speaker and delegate representing Council of Jewish Women at the International Congress of Women. She was also at the Atlanta Exposition (1896); London (1899), Speaker Vacation Schools; Berlin (1904), Toronto (1909). She was Chairman of the Press Committee of Council of Jewish Women, 1899-1904.

American was instrumental in the formation of the Jewish Study Society (1899) and, later, in the formation of the Union of Jewish Women Workers in England. She assisted in the formation of the Jüdischer Frauenbund in Berlin in 1904. She was a member of the Council of Women of the United States and a member of the Executive Committee of the Council of Women of the United States since 1898. She was a speaker at the Triennial Council of Women of the United States, 1895, 1898, 1902. She served on the committee on Peace Propaganda, Council of Women of the United States (1899-1904). She served as chair of the Committee on Immigration and Emigration (1911).

American was speaker at the Biennial of the General Federation of Clubs in Denver in 1896. She was a member of the Industrial Committee, New York State Federation of Women's Clubs, 1905. She was a speaker on playgrounds at the General Federation of Women's Clubs, Boston, 1908.

American was director of the Woman's Municipal League New York City, 1901. She served as chair of the Woman's Municipal League Tenement House Committee, 1902-1903. She was a member of the Executive Committee Intermunicipal Association for Household Research, 1904.

For the Consumers' League, American was vice-president, 1898-1899 and director, 1899, Illinois Consumers' League. She was president of the Consumers' League of New York State, 1901-1905, and a member of the Executive Committee National Consumers' League, 1901 -1906.

Her Chicago activities including being club leader of the Maxwell Street Settlement, Chicago, 1894-1898. She was a teacher at the Sinai Temple Sunday School, Chicago, 1894-1899; and a member of the Executive Committee, Civic Federation of Chicago, 1895-1899. She was a founder of Vacation Schools, Chicago, 1896; president of the League for Religious Fellowship, Chicago, 1896; founder and chair of the Permanent Vacation School and Playground Committee of Chicago Women's Clubs, 1896-1900; member of the Executive Committee of the South Side District Bureau of Charities, Chicago, 1896-1899.

American was director the Cook County League of Women's Clubs, 1897-1898. She was a member of the committee in Chicago which drew and secured the passage of the Illinois Juvenile Court Law. She was a member of the Executive Committee of the Committee of One Hundred to revise laws regulating education in Illinois, 1897-1898. She was a member of the Executive Committee and one of the founders at the call of the Governor, Army and Navy League of Illinois during the Spanish–American War, 1898. She died in New York City in 1944.
