= The Vicar of Bullhampton =

1870 novel by Anthony Trollope

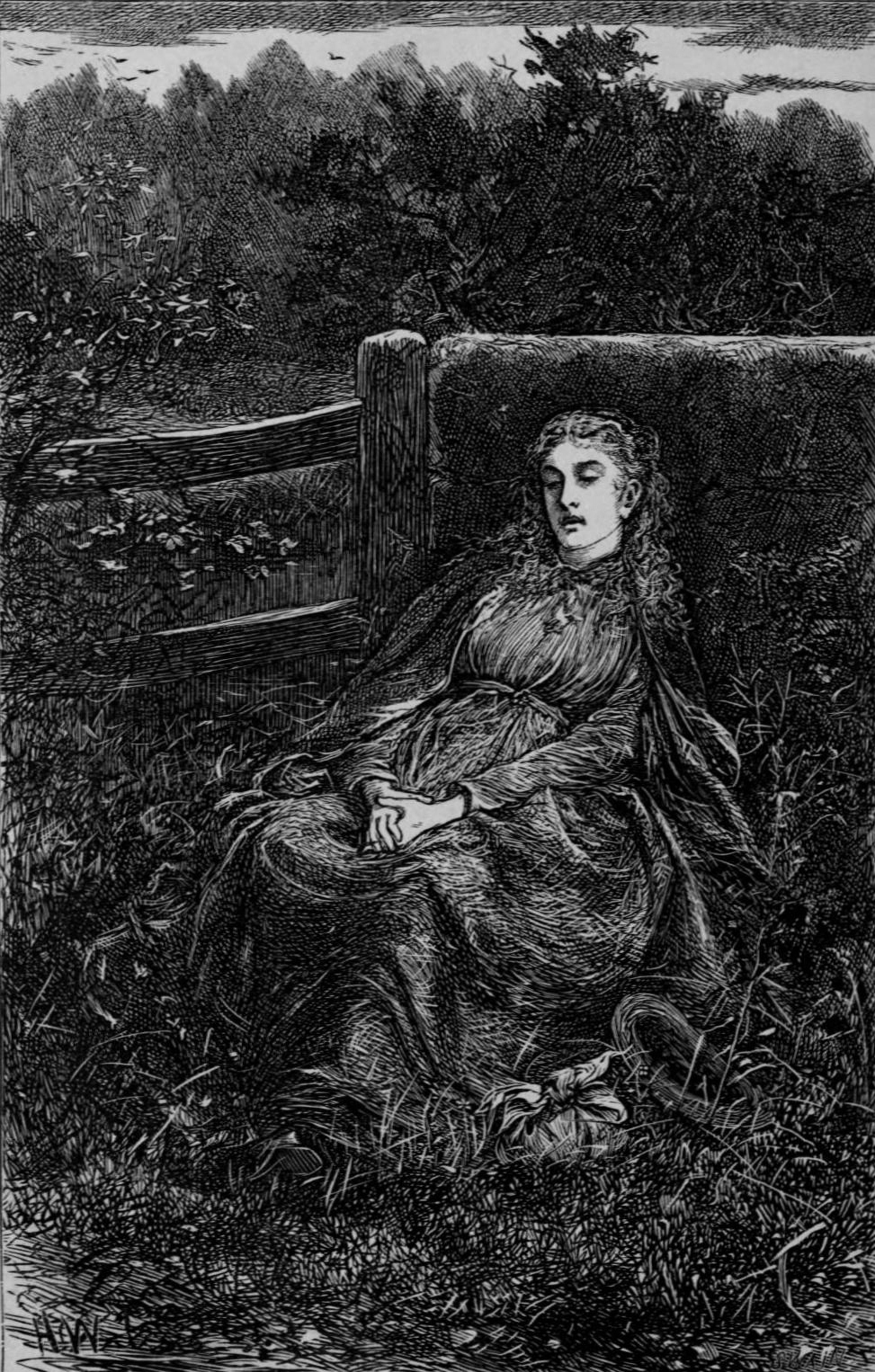
- Carry Brattle: Henry Woods illustration from 1870 Bradbury and Evans edition
- Author: Anthony Trollope
- Language: English
- Publisher: Bradbury and Evans
- Publication date: 1870
- Publication place: England
- Media type: Print (serial, book)
- ISBN: 0-19-282163-6 (Oxford World's Classics paperback, 1988)

The Vicar of Bullhampton is an 1870 novel by Anthony Trollope. It is made up of three intertwining subplots: the courtship of a young woman by two suitors; a feud between the titular broad church vicar and a low church nobleman, abetted by a Methodist minister; and the vicar's attempt to rehabilitate a young woman who has gone astray.

Trollope expected his depiction of a fallen woman to be controversial, and unusually for him wrote a preface defending it. But the anticipated controversy never materialised, and contemporary reviewers tended to ignore that subplot, focussing instead on the courtship in the novel. Reviews were generally less than positive; many reviewers and readers who had acquired a taste for Trollope from the 1850s–60s Barchester novels were unhappy about the darker tone of later novels such as this one.

Trollope's fortunes suffered because of the mode of the novel's publication. Owing to mismanagement by the publishers, it was not serialised in a popular magazine, as originally intended. Instead, it was issued as monthly numbers, a form of serialisation that had become unpopular with the reading public, and Trollope lost readers as a result.

== Plot summary ==
The Vicar of Bullhampton is set in a small town in Wiltshire. It develops three subplots, all connected with Frank Fenwick, the eponymous vicar.

=== Mary Lowther ===
The first subplot involves the courtship of Mary Lowther, a childhood friend of the vicar's wife. Harry Gilmore, a Bullhampton squire and a friend of the Fenwicks, falls deeply in love with her. Mary recognises that Gilmore is a good man, but she fears that she does not adore him as a woman should adore the man she marries. The Fenwicks and her guardian aunt all urge her to accept his proposal, telling her that the affection she does not now feel will come after marriage. In the face of this advice, she does not reject Gilmore outright, but asks for time to consider.

Mary finds the love she seeks in her second cousin, Captain Walter Marrable. He falls in love with her, and she joyously accepts his offer of marriage. However, misfortune strikes in the form of Colonel Marrable, the Captain's father, who swindles his son out of the fortune left him by his late mother. The impoverished Captain fears that he will have to return to India with his regiment; he and Mary, each unwilling to inflict poverty on the other, end their engagement by mutual consent and with mutual regret.

Mary, dispirited, yields to Gilmore's importunements, warning him that theirs must be a long engagement and that she will end it if Captain Marrable finds himself able to marry a woman without a fortune. This comes to pass: the death of the Captain's cousin, the heir to the family's baronetcy, makes him the likely eventual heir. The current Baronet accepts the Captain as his heir, buying out the Colonel's interest to prevent his squandering the family fortune. The two lovers are reunited, leaving Gilmore bitter and despondent.

=== Brattle family ===
The second subplot involves the family of Bullhampton's miller, Jacob Brattle. His youngest son, Sam, is a hard worker at the mill, but has fallen in with bad companions, and is often absent from home. Sam's sister Carry is even worse off: having yielded to a seducer, she has been disowned by her father, and is living a life of sin in an unknown location.

When a Bullhampton farmer is murdered in the course of a burglary, suspicion falls on Sam Brattle and his associates. Fenwick believes in Sam's innocence, and acts as one of his bondsmen. Through Sam he discovers Carry's whereabouts, and resolves to rescue her if he can. He finds her a temporary home, but it becomes clear to him that the only permanent solution must involve bringing her back into the Brattle family, which means winning her father's forgiveness.

Carry leaves the home that Fenwick has found her and wanders distraught. Eventually, she returns to the mill, half resolved to see her old home and then drown herself in the millstream. There she is greeted lovingly by her mother and sister. Her father reluctantly allows her to remain in the family home; eventually he too forgives her, although he can never forget the shame she has brought on the family. Carry remains with her family for the rest of her life, but although she has returned to decency, her past ensures that she will never find an honest husband.

Sam is never charged with the murder, although one of his former associates is hanged for it. He continues to work at the mill, and eventually marries a Bullhampton girl.

=== Marquis and Methodist ===
A third subplot centres on the relationship between Fenwick, Mr. Puddleham, the village's Methodist minister, and the Marquis of Trowbridge, Bullhampton's principal landowner. The marquis believes that Sam Brattle is guilty of the murder, and is angered by Fenwick's support for him. He spreads rumours about Fenwick's relations with Carry Brattle, and grants Puddleham permission to build a chapel on a piece of land neighbouring Fenwick's residence, where he hopes that the sight of it and the sound of its bell will annoy the vicar. Fenwick tries to reconcile himself to the existence of the chapel, but it subsequently comes to light that the land does not belong to the marquis, and is instead part of the parish's glebe. The embarrassed marquis pays to move the chapel to a new location, and through the intervention of his son, a suave Member of Parliament, he and Fenwick are reconciled.

== Major themes ==
=== Plight of the fallen woman ===
According to Trollope, the plight of Carry Brattle was at the center of the story. "The Vicar of Bullhampton was written chiefly with the object of exciting not only pity but sympathy for fallen woman, and of raising a feeling of forgiveness for such in the minds of other women." In An Autobiography he argued that the punishment for fornication is far heavier for women than for men, although in most cases the latter are more to blame than the former; and that women are given no opportunity of returning to decent lives, however repentant they might be.

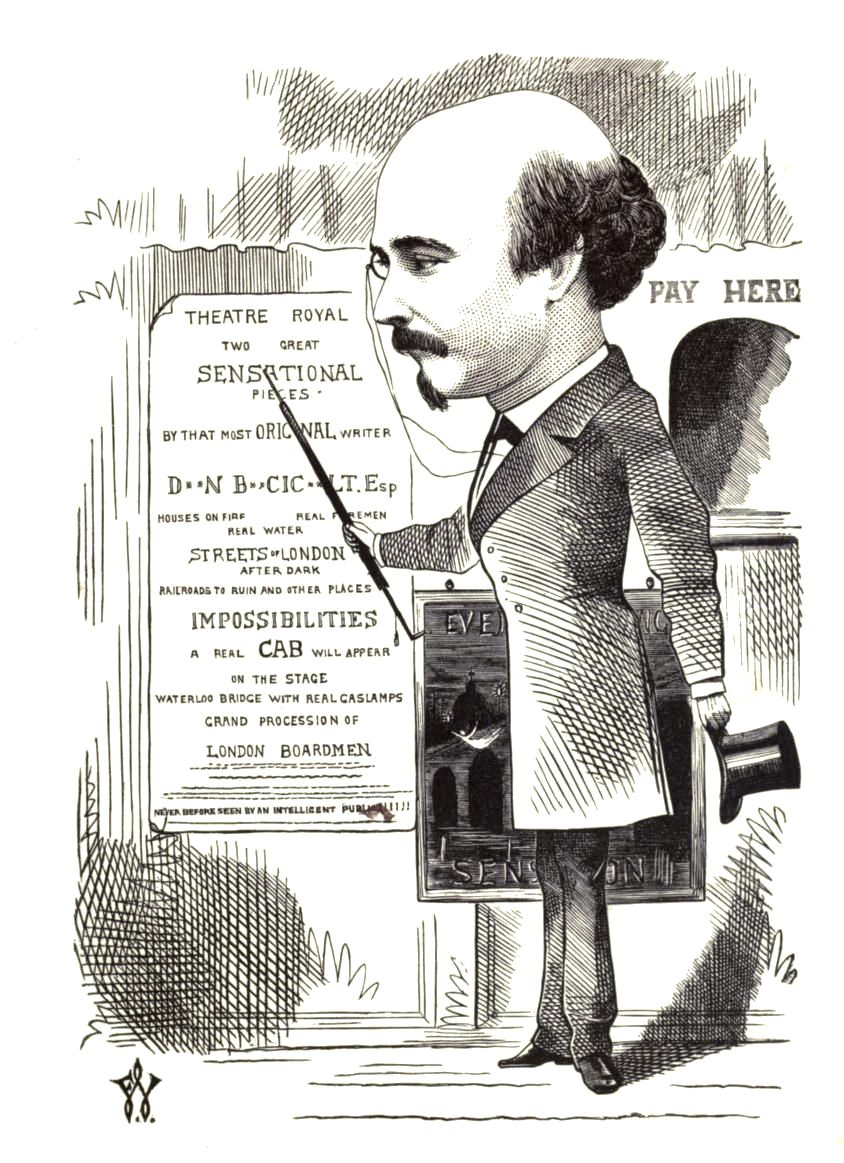
Dion Boucicault

On 5 August 1869, shortly after The Vicar had begun to appear in the form of monthly numbers, Dion Boucicault's Formosa; or, The Railroad to Ruin opened at Drury Lane. The title character of Boucicault's play was a harlot, and her representation on stage provoked an exchange in the pages of The Times. Critics argued that the depiction of a prostitute in the theatre would tarnish the innocence of unmarried girls attending the performance. Supporters, including Boucicault himself, responded that worse women were regularly portrayed in Italian operas such as La traviata and Lucrezia Borgia, which were considered eminently suitable for young women, and in the police and court news of The Times itself.

Trollope leapt into the fray somewhat belatedly, in the pages of Saint Paul's in October 1869, with an article on the Formosa controversy that can be read as a defence of and an advertisement for The Vicar. He took exception to several of the arguments in The Times: young women of the 1860s, he wrote, were not unaware of the existence of prostitution; and attempting to keep them in ignorance would not conduce to virtue. Rather than promoting vice, an accurate depiction of the squalid and miserable life of a woman of the streets would arm young people to resist temptation.

The harm done by Formosa lies in this,— that the character is utterly false, false to human nature and false to London life. She is a wretch, abominable almost beyond conception, so as to be odious, if known, to the most odious. She is sharper as well as prostitute,—and is false to all with whom she comes in contact, to those whom she is supposed to love and to those who love her. Her peculiar profession is represented as causing her no personal remorse. And yet she is exhibited to us as a fine creature, a noble woman, one whom a man might be honoured by loving;—and at last she ends with a success! ... That which is vile and dirty, squalid and miserable,—that, of which we may say that were its horrors known such knowledge would deter more thoroughly than any ignorance,—is exhibited as a bright existence, full of danger indeed, but still open to all that is noble, and capable of final success.

When the book edition of The Vicar of Bullhampton appeared in April 1870, it bore a preface; Trollope, who ordinarily scorned prefaces and dedications, felt compelled to justify the presentation of a character like Carry Brattle. He reiterated the points he had made regarding Formosa: that while depicting a fallen woman as glamorous or noble might lead impressionable readers to vice, a true depiction of such a woman's misery might deter readers from yielding to temptation; and might soften the hearts of parents whose daughters have fallen, and thus afford an opportunity of returning to decency.

=== Love and courtship ===
A recurring theme in Trollope's work is the difficulty of choosing between two suitors. As Henry James expressed it,

Trollope has described again and again the ravages of love ... His story is always primarily a love-story, and a love-story constructed on an inveterate system. There is a young lady who has two lovers, or a young man who has two sweethearts; we are treated to the innumerable forms in which this predicament may present itself and the consequences, sometimes pathetic, sometimes grotesque, which spring from such false situations.

To illustrate this point, James cited The Vicar, with Mary Lowther's vacillation between Gilmore and Col. Marrable.

Unlike the majority of Trollope's triangles, Mary is not called upon to judge between a good suitor and a bad one, but between two good men. Gilmore is presented as a sympathetic and admirable character; the reader learns far less about Captain Marrable's character, and is given no reason why Mary should prefer him to his rival. To Trollope, a woman does not necessarily fall in love because of a man's merits; and it is very wrong for a woman to marry where she does not love, regardless of her suitor's worthy qualities.

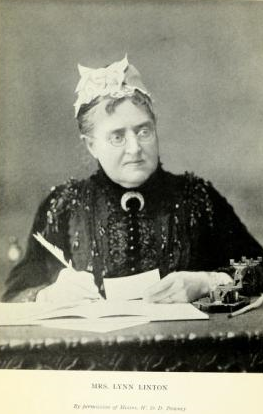
Eliza Lynn Linton

=== "The Girl of the Period" ===
In David Skilton's view, the Carry Brattle and Mary Lowther subplots together comprise a rejoinder to Eliza Lynn Linton's "The Girl of the Period". In her 1868 essay, Linton accused contemporary English girls of imitating prostitutes in their dress, speech, and manner, and declared that "the Girl of the Period has done away with such moral muffishness as consideration for others, or regard for counsel and rebuke". Trollope was well aware of Linton's views, and made two references to them in the novel. According to Skilton, the highly unromantic portrayal of Carry Brattle's condition was a denial of Linton's claim that demimondaines were "gorgeously attired and sumptuously appointed ... flattered, fêted, and courted"; and the trouble that Mary Lowther brought upon herself and others came about not because of her disregard for counsel and rebuke, but because she attempted to follow the advice of her friends and elders. Near the end of the novel, Trollope writes:

[The author] has endeavoured to describe a young woman, prompted in all her doings by a conscience wide awake, guided by principle, willing, if need be, to sacrifice herself, struggling always to keep herself from doing wrong, but yet causing infinite grief to others, and nearly bringing herself to utter shipwreck, because, for a while, she allowed herself to believe that it would be right for her to marry a man whom she did not love.

In Skilton's opinion, since the stories of the two women are both essential to Trollope's refutation of Linton, neither can be given "titular pre-eminence"; thus the book had to take its name from the vicar. (The title was changed at some point in the novel's development; in the early planning stages, it was tentatively named I Count Her Wrong.)

=== Religion ===
The Vicar of Bullhampton has been described as Trollope's most religious novel, and Frank Fenwick as his "most explicitly religious character". Although the author won renown for his depictions of the lives of the clergy in the Barsetshire novels, he wrote of their social rather than their spiritual lives. In The Vicar, however, Fenwick's object is "to apply Christian doctrine to life in the world."

A variety of religious beliefs are represented among the novel's characters. Jacob Brattle is an unbeliever. Puddleham is a Primitive Methodist. The Stowte family, to which the marquis belongs, are Low Church Anglicans, and Fenwick is high church and latitudinarian. Their charity is tested by their response to Carry Brattle, and it is Fenwick who passes the test. As William Cadbury expresses it, Puddleham has been hardened by too much doctrine, Jacob Brattle by too little.

Fenwick's beliefs are similar to Trollope's own. In his early life, the novelist was a supporter of the Tractarians. However, beginning in about the mid-1860s, his sympathies tended increasingly toward the broad church. He defended Bishop Colenso, expressed doubt about the literal truth of the Old Testament, and questioned the doctrine of eternal punishment contained in the Athanasian Creed.

Indeed, Fenwick resembled his creator in more than belief. To T. H. S. Escott, who was personally acquainted with Trollope, Fenwick—generous, outspoken, broad-minded, and a bit pugnacious—was very much like a portrait of the author in clerical dress. Puddleham's discomfiture "proves, to Trollope's naively undisguised satisfaction, that Providence is on the side of the State Church".

== Publication history ==
=== Once A Week ===
Early in 1868, Trollope was approached by E. S. Dallas, a fellow member of the Garrick Club. Dallas had just been appointed editor of Once A Week, a magazine published by the firm of Bradbury and Evans. Trollope agreed to provide a novel of the length of The Claverings, to be serialised beginning in May 1869, for a fee of £2800. In the course of his correspondence with Dallas, Trollope wrote, "Of course it is understood that it is intended for your periodical, Once A Week."

Trollope wrote The Vicar of Bullhampton between 15 June and 1 November 1868. The novel was begun in Washington, D.C., where the author was on a mission to negotiate a postal treaty and international copyright arrangements with the United States. It was concluded after his return to England, in the early stages of his unsuccessful campaign for a Parliamentary seat in the borough of Beverley.

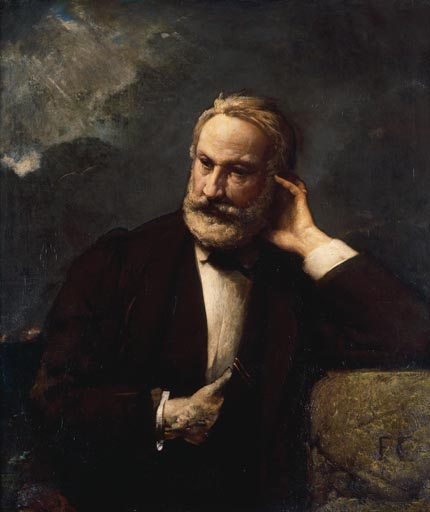
Victor Hugo, ca. 1868

As the publication date neared, difficulties arose. In January 1869, Dallas asked Trollope for permission to defer serial publication by three months. As Trollope had agreed not to allow another of his novels to run serially during the first six months of The Vicar's career, the editor's request would have diminished the author's income. Trollope initially refused, but subsequently agreed to a delay of two months, with publication to begin in early July.

Matters did not improve. In March 1869, Dallas made a new request of Trollope. Once A Week had bought the rights to Victor Hugo's forthcoming novel, L'homme qui rit, expecting to begin serialisation in January 1869. However, Hugo was behind schedule, and the novel would not be available until April. The magazine did not have enough space to run Hugo's and Trollope's novels side by side. Would Trollope, therefore, be willing to see The Vicar serialised in The Gentleman's Magazine instead?

Trollope would not. The Gentleman's Magazine was, in Michael Sadleir's words, "a very inferior paper with a lower class of reader and a poor general reputation". Moreover, personal feelings were involved: Trollope resented the fact that he, a punctual Englishman, was being asked to yield to a dilatory Frenchman.

My disgust at this proposition was, I think, chiefly due to Victor Hugo's latter novels, which I regard as pretentious and untrue to nature. To this perhaps was added some feeling of indignation that I should be asked to give way to a Frenchman. The Frenchman had broken his engagement. He had failed to have his work finished by the stipulated time. From week to week and from month to month he had put off the fulfilment of his duty. And because of these laches on his part,— on the part of this sententious French Radical,— I was to be thrown over!

Trollope refused. Hugo's novel was published in The Gentleman's Magazine, beginning in May 1869. However, by the end of June, the sale of Once A Week to a new publisher was in progress. Rather than serialising The Vicar in the magazine, Bradbury and Evans issued it in eleven monthly shilling numbers, running from July 1869 to May 1870. Trollope could not object to this mode of independent publication; but it was one that had fallen out of favour with the public, and Trollope suffered a loss of reputation and readership as a result. He also suffered a pecuniary loss of £300, agreeing for reasons unspecified to accept only £2500 for the novel.

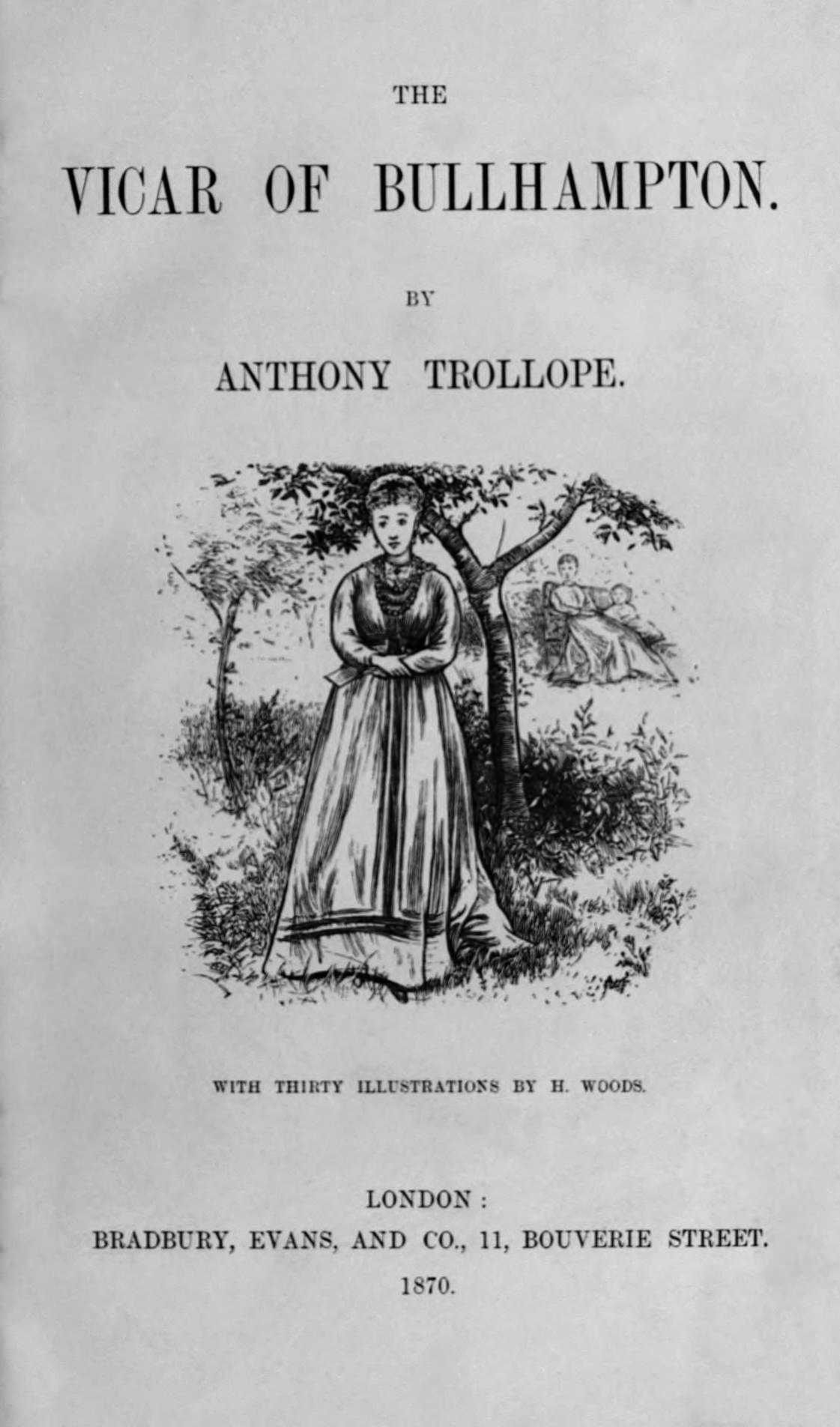
Title page of 1870 Bradbury, Evans, and Co. edition

=== Other publication ===
The Vicar of Bullhampton was published serially in Lippincott's Monthly Magazine of Philadelphia in 1869–70. At the same time, an American book edition was issued by J. B. Lippincott & Co.

Bradbury and Evans released the novel in book form in 1870, as a single volume with thirty illustrations by Henry Woods. In the same year, English-language books were published by Harper in New York and by Tauchnitz in Leipzig; a Russian translation, Bullhamptonsky Vikaryi, was published in Moscow. In 1872, a Dutch translation, De Predikant van Bullhampton, was published by Roelants of Schiedam; in 1873, a Russian Bullhamptonsky Vikaryi was released in St. Petersburg.

More recently, editions have been published by Dover Publications in 1979; by Alan Sutton in 1983; by Oxford University Press in 1924, re-issued with an introduction by David Skilton in 1988; and by the Trollope Society, with an introduction by John Halperin, in 1998.

== Reception ==
Trollope's preface suggests that he anticipated controversy from the depiction of Carry Brattle in The Vicar of Bullhampton. This did not happen. The Times declared it "a nice, easy, safe reading book for old ladies and young ladies ... welcome in all well-regulated families". Contemporary reviewers tended to neglect the Carry Brattle subplot and focus on Mary Lowther, whose conduct was criticised by Blackwood's Magazine, by The Times, and by Mrs. Oliphant. The Saturday Review complained that "[a] sort of savageness pervades the book", and that "[n]obody is pleasant", and described the novel as "third-rate" and as a "not very satisfactory book". This was in keeping with the reaction of many readers and reviewers who had grown accustomed to the wholesome tone and genteel characters of the Barchester novels, and were not happy with the darker and more pessimistic tone of Trollope's later works.

Later critics varied in their opinion of the novel. Henry James, who had loudly derided several of Trollope's novels of the mid-1860s, described it in an 1883 article as a "slow but excellent story, which is a capital example of interest produced by the quietest conceivable means". In 1927, Michael Sadleir wrote that it "has a sure title to enduring reputation"; of Mary Lowther, whom earlier critics had found irritating, he wrote, "to-day she seems sensible enough and, as a young woman, wholly natural.". By 1971, however, James Pope-Hennessy labelled the novel "a lifeless, dull production".

More recently still, Trollope scholars have looked upon it with increasing favour, describing it as a powerful work that has suffered undeserved neglect. Present-day critics have focussed increasingly on the Carry Brattle subplot; it has been suggested, supported in part by the similarity of passages from The Vicar, from the Autobiography, and from The Small House at Allington referring to Johnny Eames, that some aspects of her portrayal are based on the novelist's own early adulthood in London.
