= Joseph Berg Esenwein =

American lecturer and writer

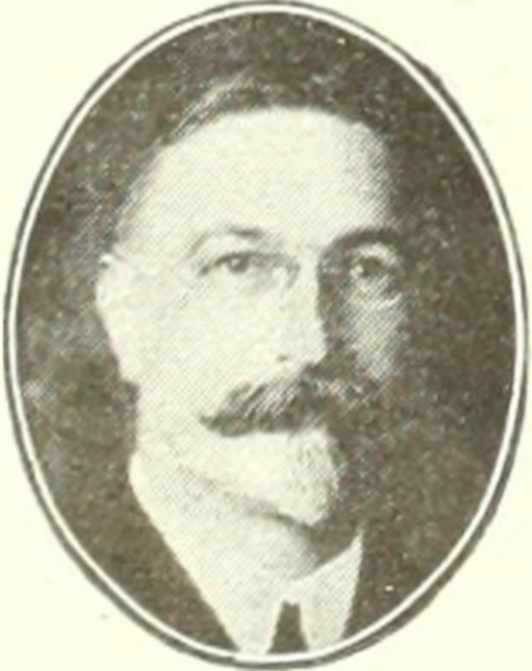
- Born: May 16, 1867; Philadelphia, Pennsylvania
- Died: November 1, 1946 (aged 79)
- Resting place: Mount Lebanon Cemetery, Lebanon, Pennsylvania
- Citizenship: United States
- Education: Albright College, Millersville Normal School, Lafayette College, Richmond College and the University of Omaha
- Occupations: Editor, lecturer, and writer
- Relatives: Father: Augustus Esenwein; mother: Catherine Esenwein

Joseph Berg Esenwein (May 16, 1867 – November 1, 1946) was an American editor, lecturer and writer. He was noted for contributions to the Library of the World's Best Literature.

== Biography ==
Esenwein was born in Philadelphia to parents Augustus and Catherine Esenwein. He was educated at Albright College, Millersville Normal School, Lafayette College, Richmond College and the University of Omaha. He was president of Albright Collegiate Institute in 1895–96, and in the following year held the position of educational director of the Y. M. C. A. at Washington Heights, New York City.

After a year of foreign travel, he became professor of English in the Pennsylvania Military College at Chester, subsequently giving up teaching in 1903 to become manager of the Booklovers' Magazine. Two years later, he was made editor and manager of Lippincott's Magazine, a position which he held until 1914 while teaching a private course on short-story writing. Esenwein wrote some of the first books on creative writing, including Writing the Short-Story (1909). In 1915, he became editor of The Writer's Monthly, Springfield, Mass. He is known both as a lecturer and writer.

== Bibliography ==
Esenwein's published works, besides articles contributed to Charles Dudley Warner's Library of the World's Best Literature, include:

- Songs for Reapers (1895)
- Modern Agnosticism (1896)
- Feathers for Shafts (1897)
- Writing the Short-Story: A Practical Handbook on the Rise, Structure, Writing, and Sale of the Modern Short-Story (1909)
- Lessons in the Short Story (1910)
- Short Story Masterpieces (1912)
- Writing the Photoplay (1913; revised edition with Arthur Leeds, 1919)
- The Art of Public Speaking (1915), with Dale Carnegie
- Writing for the Magazines (1916)
- Children's Stories and How to Tell Them (1917)
- Russian Short Story Masterpieces (two volumes, 1919)
- Field and Campus Stories for Girls (1937)

== Personal life ==
Esenwein married Caroline Miller in 1889. They had three children, J. Harold Esenwein (1890-1913), Ruth Esenwein (1891-1892) and Carl Esenwein (1896–1897).
