= Anthony Trollope bibliography =

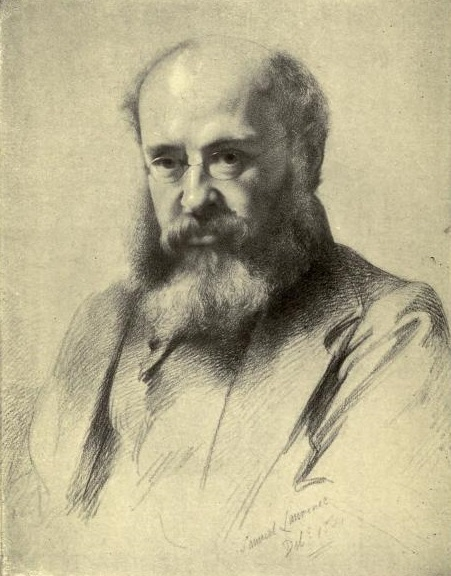
Anthony Trollope, 1864

This is a bibliography of the works of Anthony Trollope.

== Novels ==
=== Standalone novels ===
Title	Date	First publisher	Notes
La Vendée: An Historical Romance	1850	H. Colburn	
The Three Clerks	1858	Richard Bentley	
The Bertrams	1859	Chapman & Hall	
Orley Farm	1862	Chapman & Hall	
The Struggles of Brown, Jones & Robinson	1862	Smith, Elder & Co.	Originally serialized in the Cornhill Magazine in 1861-62, and first published in book form in a pirate edition by Harper in New York. Not published as a book in the United Kingdom until 1870.
Rachel Ray	1863	Chapman & Hall	
Miss Mackenzie	1865	Chapman & Hall	
The Belton Estate	1866	Chapman & Hall	
The Claverings	1867	Smith, Elder & Co.	
Nina Balatka	1867	Blackwood	Published anonymously.
Linda Tressel	1868	Blackwood	Published anonymously.
He Knew He Was Right	1869	Strahan	
The Vicar of Bullhampton	1870	Bradbury and Evans	
Sir Harry Hotspur of Humblethwaite	1871	Hurst and Blackett	
Ralph the Heir	1871	Hurst and Blackett	
The Golden Lion of Granpère	1872	Tinsley Brothers	
Harry Heathcote of Gangoil	1874	Sampson, Low	
Lady Anna	1874	Chapman & Hall	Serialized in the Australasian.
The Way We Live Now	1875	Chapman & Hall	
Is He Popenjoy?	1878	Chapman & Hall	
John Caldigate	1879	Chapman & Hall	
Cousin Henry	1879	Chapman & Hall	Serialized in the Manchester Weekly Times and the North British Weekly Mail from 8 March 1879 to 24 May 1879.
Doctor Wortle's School	1881	Chapman & Hall	
The Fixed Period	1882	Blackwood	
Kept in the Dark	1882	Chatto & Windus	
Marion Fay	1882	Chapman & Hall	
Mr. Scarborough's Family	1883	Chatto & Windus	
An Old Man's Love	1884	Blackwood	

=== Novel series ===
==== Chronicles of Barsetshire ====
Title	Date	First publisher	Notes
The Warden	1855	Longman, Brown, Green, and Longmans	
Barchester Towers	1857		Barchester Towers was the first of Trollope's novels to establish his popularity with the general reading public. Reprinted: New York: The Macmillan Company, 1926 (with an introduction by James I. Osborne).; New York: Washington Square Press, Inc., 1963 (with an introduction by Ralph H. Singleton).
Doctor Thorne	1858	Chapman & Hall	Reprinted: London: Penguin Books, 1991 (with an introduction by Ruth Rendell).
Framley Parsonage	1861	Smith, Elder & Co.	Appeared as a serial in The Cornhill Magazine, from January, 1860, to April, 1861. Reprinted: London: Oxford University Press, 1957.; New York: Knopf, 1994 (with an introduction by Graham Handley).; London: Trollope Society, 1996 (with an introduction by Antonia Fraser).
The Small House at Allington	1864	Smith, Elder & Co.	
The Last Chronicle of Barset	1867	Smith, Elder & Co.	

==== Palliser novels ====
Title	Date	First publisher	Notes
Can You Forgive Her?	1865	Chapman & Hall	It was published in twenty monthly parts, from January 1864 to August 1865. Henry James reviewed savagely in The Nation.
Phineas Finn	1869	Virtue & Co.	
The Eustace Diamonds	1873	Chapman & Hall	First published as a serial in the Fortnightly Review, from July 1871 to February 1873. Reprinted: St. Albans: Panther, 1968 (with an introduction by Simon Raven).; London: Oxford University Press, 1973 (with an introduction by Michael Sadleir).; London: The Trollope Society, 1990 (with an introduction by P.D. James).
Phineas Redux	1874	Chapman & Hall	First published as a serial in The Graphic, from 9 July 1873 to 10 January 1874.
The Prime Minister	1876	Chapman & Hall	
The Duke's Children	1880	Chapman & Hall	Appeared as a serial in All the Year Round, from 4 October 1879 to 14 July 1880. Reprinted: London: Oxford University Press, 1973 (with a preface by Chauncey B. Tinker).; London: The Trollope Society, 1991 (with an introduction by Roy Jenkins).; New York: Penguin Books, 1995 (with an introduction and notes by Dinah Birch).; The Amarnick reconstruction Trollope was obliged to cut around a quarter of his manuscript before it was published in serial and book form. Professor Steven Amarnick and colleagues have reconstructed an uncut version of the novel from the original manuscript held at Yale University’s Beinecke Library. This has been published as The Duke's Children: The Complete Text by: The Folio Society, London, 2015, with an introduction by Joanna Trollope — limited edition; Everyman's Library, New York and London, 2017, with an introduction by Max Egremont; Oxford World's Classics, Oxford, 2020, with an introduction by Steven Amarnick.

==== Related novels ====
Title	Date	First publisher	Notes
The American Senator	1877	Chapman & Hall	Monthly serial in Temple Bar, May 1876 to July 1877. Several of the characters appear also in Ayala's Angel and in the Barsetshire and Palliser novels.
Ayala's Angel	1881	Chapman & Hall	written between 25 April and 24 September 1878, first published in the United States, in the periodical Cincinnati Commercial Tribune that released it in increments, probably of 4 chapters per issue, between 6 November 1880 and 23 July 1881 with illustrations. British publication released in May 1882 without illustrations.

=== Irish novels ===
Title	Date	First publisher	Notes
The Macdermots of Ballycloran	1847	Thomas Cautley Newby	
The Kellys and the O'Kellys	1848	H. Colburn	Reprinted: London: Jonathan Lane (with an introduction by Algar Thorold).; New York: Random House, 1937 (with an introduction by Shane Leslie).; Oxford: Oxford University Press, 1978.; New York: Garland Pub., 1979 (with an introduction by Robert Lee Wolff).
Castle Richmond	1860	Chapman & Hall	
An Eye for an Eye	1879	Chapman & Hall	
The Landleaguers	1883	Chatto & Windus	Unfinished

== Short story collections ==
- Tales of All Countries, 1st Series (1861)
  - "La Mère Bauche"
  - "The O'Conors of Castle Conor"
  - "John Bull on the Guadalquivir"
  - "Miss Sarah Jack, of Spanish Town, Jamaica"
  - "The Courtship of Susan Bell"
  - "Relics of General Chassé"
  - "An Unprotected Female At the Pyramids"
  - "The Château of Prince Polignac"
- Tales of All Countries, 2nd Series (1863)
  - "Aaron Trow"
  - "Mrs. General Talboys"
  - "The Parson's Daughter of Oxney Colne"
  - "George Walker At Suez"
  - "The Mistletoe Bough"
  - "Returning Home"
  - "A Ride Across Palestine"
  - "The House of Heine Brothers in Munich"
  - "The Man Who Kept His Money In a Box"
- Lotta Schmidt and Other Stories (1867)
  - "Lotta Schmidt"
  - "The Adventures of Fred Pickering"
  - "The Two Generals"
  - "Father Giles of Ballymoy"
  - "Malachi's Cove"
  - "The Widow's Mite"
  - "The Last Austrian Who Left Venice"
  - "Miss Ophelia Gledd"
  - "The Journey to Panama"
- An Editor's Tales (1870)
  - "Mary Gresley"
  - "The Turkish Bath"
  - "Josephine De Montmorenci"
  - "The Panjandrum"
  - "The Spotted Dog"
  - "Mrs. Brumby"
- Why Frau Frohmann Raised Her Prices and other Stories (1882)
  - "Why Frau Frohmann Raised Her Prices"
  - "The Lady of Launay"
  - "Christmas At Thompson Hall"
  - "The Telegraph Girl"
  - "Alice Dugdale"
- Collected Short Stories, introduced by Susan L. Humphreys (New York: Arno Press, 1981)
  This volume brings together (in facsimile) seven short stories from periodicals that were not included in collections during Trollope's lifetime. Some of these stories have appeared in anthologies.
  - "Gentle Euphemia" (1866)
  - "Katchen's Caprices" (1866–1867) — an unsigned story from Harper's Weekly that is no longer considered to be by Trollope
  - "Christmas Day at Kirkby Cottage" (1870)
  - "Never, Never — Never, Never" (1875)
  - "Catherine Carmichael" (1878)
  - "The Two Heroines of Plumplington" (1882)
  - "Not If I Know It" (1882)

== Non-fiction ==
Title	Date	First publisher	Notes
The West Indies and the Spanish Main	1859	Chapman & Hall	
North America	1862	Chapman & Hall	
Hunting Sketches	1865	Chapman & Hall	First published as a serial in the Pall Mall Gazette in 1865.
Travelling Sketches	1866	Chapman & Hall	Appeared as a serial in the Pall Mall Gazette in 1865.
Clergymen of the Church of England	1866	Chapman & Hall	Serialized in the Pall Mall Gazette (1865–1866).
On English Prose Fiction as a Rational Amusement	1869		Reprinted: Four Lectures. London: Constable, 1938 (with an introduction by Morris L. Parrish).; Oxford Reader's Companion to Trollope. Oxford: Oxford University Press, 1999.; An Autobiography and Other Writings. Oxford: Oxford University Press, 2014 (with an introduction by Nicholas Shrimpton).
The Commentaries of Caesar	1870	Blackwood	
Australia and New Zealand	1873	Chapman & Hall	Serialised in the newspaper Australasian, from 22 February 1873 to 20 June 1874. The first edition was published as a two-volume set costing 36 shillings. In 1874 Chapman & Hall reissued the work in four budget volumes costing three shillings each, which could be purchased individually. The volumes were: (i) New Zealand; (ii) Victoria and Tasmania; (iii) New South Wales and Queensland; (iv) South Australia and Western Australia.
South Africa	1878	Chapman & Hall	
How the 'Mastiffs' Went to Iceland	1878	Privately printed	First published as "Iceland," The Fortnightly Review, Vol. XXX, 1878, pp. 175–190.
Thackeray	1879	Macmillan	
Life of Cicero	1880	Chapman & Hall	
Lord Palmerston	1882	Isbister	
An Autobiography	1883	Blackwood	
London Tradesmen	1927	E. Mathews & Marrot	Published posthumously. Edited with a foreword by Michael Sadleir.
The New Zealander	1972 (written 1855-56)	Clarendon Press	Published posthumously. Edited with an introduction by N. John Hall. Reprinted: London: The Trollope Society, 1995.

== Articles ==
Title	Publication date	First published in	Notes
"American Literary Piracy"	September, 1862	The Athenæum	
"W. M. Thackeray"	February, 1864	The Cornhill Magazine	
"On Anonymous Literature"	1865	The Fortnightly Review	
"The Irish Church"	1865	The Fortnightly Review	
"The Public Schools"	1865	The Fortnightly Review	
"The Civil Service"	1865	The Fortnightly Review	
"The Fourth Commandment"	1866	The Fortnightly Review	
"Mr. Freeman on the Morality of Hunting"	1869	The Fortnightly Review	Written in reply to E.A. Freeman's article "The Morality of Field Sports." Reprinted: Miscellaneous Essays and Reviews. New York: Arno Press, 1981.
"Charles Dickens"	July 1870	St. Paul's Magazine	
"Cicero as a Politician"	April 1877	The Fortnightly Review	
"Cicero as a Man of Letters"	September 1877	The Fortnightly Review	
"The Young Women in the London Telegraph Office"	1877	Good Words	
"Kafir Land"	February 1878	The Fortnightly Review	
"Iceland"	August 1878	The Fortnightly Review	
"In the Hunting Field"	1879	Good Words	
"A Walk in the Wood"	1879	Good Words	
"George Henry Lewes"	January 1879	The Fortnightly Review	
"Novel Reading: The Works of Charles Dickens and W. Makepeace Thackeray"	January 1879	The Nineteenth Century	
"The Genius of Nathaniel Hawthorne"	September 1879	The North American Review	
"Henry Wadsworth Longfellow"	April 1881	The North American Review	

== Plays ==
- Did He Steal It? (1869).
- The Noble Jilt (1923).

== Letters ==
- The Tireless Traveler: Twenty Letters to the Liverpool Mercury by Anthony Trollope 1875, ed. by Bradford Allen Booth (1941).
- The Letters of Anthony Trollope, ed. by Bradford Allen Booth (1951).
- The Letters of Anthony Trollope, ed. by N. John Hall (2 vols., 1983).
