= Hetta (disambiguation) =

Hetta is a village in the municipality of Enontekiö in the north-west part of Finnish Lapland.

Hetta may also refer to:

== Places ==
- Hetta Inlet, bay in Alaska, U.S.

== People ==
- Henrik Hetta (born 1989), Swedish ice hockey player
- Aslak Hætta, (1824–1854), one of the leaders of the Kautokeino Rebellion in 1852

== Fictional characters ==
- Hetta Frith, character in Places Where They Sing by Simon Raven (1970)
- Hetta Carbury, character in The Way We Live Now by Anthony Trollope (1875)
- Sis Hetta, character in Jubilee by Margaret Walker (1966)

== Other ==
- Aslak Hetta, opera by Armas Launis (1884–1959)
- E. hetta, sea slug species of Elysia (gastropod)

== See also ==
- Harriet (name)
- Henrietta (given name)
- Heta (disambiguation)
