= The Claverings =

1867 novel by Anthony Trollope

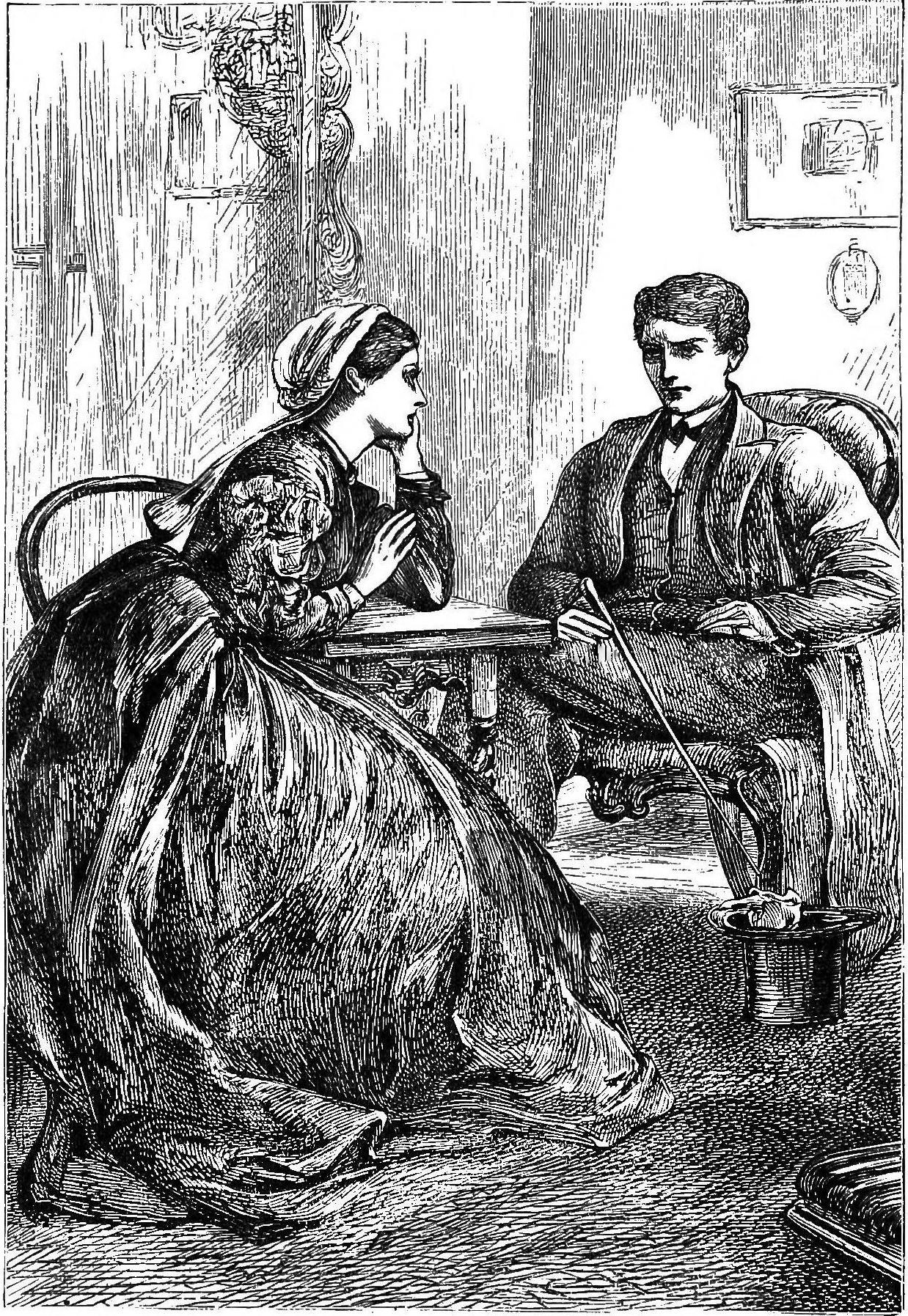
- Mary Ellen Edwards illustration: Lady Ongar and Harry Clavering
- Author: Anthony Trollope
- Language: English
- Genre: Novel
- Published: February 1866 – May 1867 (serial); April 1867 (book)
- Publisher: Cornhill Magazine (serial); Smith, Elder & Co. (book)
- Publication place: England
- Media type: Print (Serial, Hardback & Paperback)
- ISBN: 0-19-283707-9 (Oxford World's Classics paperback, 1998)
- Text: The Claverings online

The Claverings is a novel by Anthony Trollope, written in 1864, serialised from 1866 to 1867, and published in book form in 1867. It is the story of a young man starting out in life, who must find himself a profession and a wife; and of a young woman who makes a marriage of convenience and must accept the consequences of her decision.

== Plot summary ==
Harry Clavering is the only son of the Reverend Henry Clavering, a well-to-do clergyman and the paternal uncle of the affluent baronet Sir Hugh Clavering. At the start of the novel, Harry is jilted by his fiancée, the sister of Sir Hugh's wife, who proceeds to marry Lord Ongar, a wealthy but debauched earl.

Harry's father urges him to make the church his profession; but Harry aspires to become a civil engineer, of the type of Robert Stephenson, Joseph Locke, and Thomas Brassey. To this end, he becomes a pupil at the firm of Beilby and Burton.

A year and a half later, Harry has become engaged to Florence Burton, the daughter of one of his employers. He presses her for an early marriage; but although she loves him deeply, she refuses, insisting that they wait until he has an income adequate to support himself and a family.

At this point, Lord Ongar dies, and his widow returns to England. Sir Hugh, her nearest male relative, is a hard and selfish man, and refuses to see her upon her arrival. This lends spurious credence to rumours about her conduct; and it forces her sister, Lady Clavering, to ask Harry to assist her when she returns.

Harry fails to tell Lady Ongar of his engagement; and, in a moment of weakness, he embraces and kisses her. This puts him in a position where he must behave dishonourably toward one of the two women in his life: either he must break his engagement, or he must acknowledge that he has gravely insulted Lady Ongar. Although he loves Florence Burton and knows that she is the better woman, he is unwilling to subject Lady Ongar to further misery.

Lady Ongar, because of her considerable wealth, is pursued by others. She is courted by Count Pateroff, one of her late husband's friends, and by Archie Clavering, Sir Hugh's younger brother. Count Pateroff's scheming sister Sophie Gourdeloup, the only woman who will see Lady Ongar because of the rumours about her conduct, wants her to remain single so that Mme Gourdeloup can continue to exploit her.

Mme Gourdeloup sees to it that Lady Ongar learns about Harry's engagement. Meanwhile, Florence Burton learns that Harry has been seeing Lady Ongar regularly, and decides that she must release him if he does not truly love her.

Through the good influence of his mother, Harry comes to realise that Florence Burton is the better woman and the less deserving of dishonorable treatment. To her letter offering to end their engagement, he responds with a reaffirmation of his love for her. He also writes to Lady Ongar, expressing his regret for his past conduct toward her and making it clear that he intends to remain true to his fiancée.

Soon afterwards, Sir Hugh and Archie Clavering are both drowned when their yacht goes down off Heligoland. This makes Harry's father the new baronet and the possessor of Clavering Park, with Harry the heir apparent. This increase in wealth allows him to marry immediately and to give up engineering, a profession for which he almost certainly lacked sufficient self-discipline. Lady Ongar gives up much of her property to the family of the new earl, and retires into seclusion with her widowed sister.

== Major themes ==
The Claverings treats what David Skilton calls "Trollope's dominating concern of the eighteen-sixties": the choice of a career, in a broad sense. For a woman, the only possible career is marriage; for a man, it involves the choice of a profession as well as of a spouse.

Trollope's particular interest in what he himself called a hero who "vacillates and is weak" gives rise to an unconventional but deep exploration of the emotions of a man in love with two women at the same time. The result is to subvert the conventions of romantic comedy. The 'hero' is left paralysed like Buridan's ass, and is only rescued by the forces of matriarchal convention, in the form of his own mother and Florence's sister-in-law, as well as by the author's ruthless slaughtering of three male cousins to provide him with an unearned income.

To Michael Sadleir, The Claverings was a precursor of Phineas Finn and Phineas Redux. Lady Ongar rejected Harry's honest love and married for worldly gain, and found misery despite her worldly wealth; in the Phineas novels, Lady Laura Standish chose the wealthy Robert Kennedy over the warm-hearted Finn, and found herself subjected to her husband's gloomy and domineering temperament. Both women were eventually freed by widowhood; but by then the men who had truly loved them were committed to others and beyond their reach. Later and more feminist critics point to Trollope's sympathetic treatment of Lady Ongar, who is certainly made a more interesting and developed figure than the rather bland Florence, as pointing to a subversive undercurrent behind the conventional moral of the tale.

Evangelical clergymen in Trollope's novels were generally portrayed as "self-righteous, dictatorial, intolerant, and decidedly not gentlemen". Examples include Obadiah Slope of Barchester Towers, Samuel Prong of Rachel Ray, and Jeremiah Maguire of Miss Mackenzie. In The Claverings, however, Henry Clavering's curate Samuel Saul is depicted as "an Evangelical of courage, zeal, and selflessness". His diligence is contrasted to his rector's idleness; and Trollope rewards him with the hand of Fanny Clavering, Harry's sister, and with the living of the parish upon Henry Clavering's accession to the baronetcy.

== Development and publication history ==
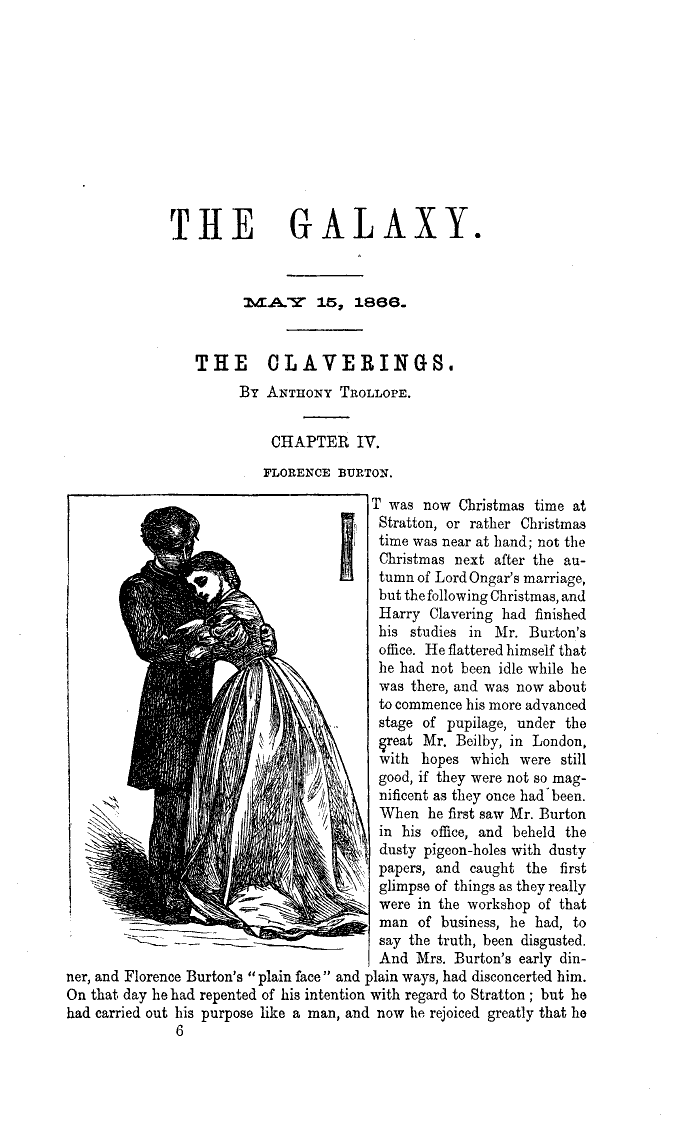
The Galaxy vol. 1 issue 2, 15 May 1866, featuring an excerpt of The Claverings

Trollope wrote The Claverings between 21 August and 31 December 1864. The work was serialised in the Cornhill Magazine from February 1866 to May 1867; it was the fourth and last of Trollope's novels published in the magazine. It was issued in book form by Smith, Elder & Co. in 1867. In the course of setting the book in type, a section of two-thirds of a page of the Cornhill text was omitted, probably accidentally.

In 1867, an American edition bearing the date 1866 was released by Harper. In that same year, Tauchnitz of Leipzig produced an English-language edition; a Dutch edition titled De Claverings was released by Brast of Dordrecht; and a Russian translation, Klaveringi, was issued in St. Petersburg. In 1875, A. Moe of Stavanger released a Norwegian translation, Familien Clavering

More recently, editions have been released by Dover Publications in 1977, by Oxford University Press in 1986, and by the Trollope Society in 1994.

Trollope received £2800 for the novel; in 1867, he also published The Last Chronicle of Barset, for which he received £3000. In 1860, George Murray Smith, Cornhill's publisher, had paid him £1000 for Framley Parsonage, his first serial in the magazine.

== Literary significance and reception ==
Trollope thought that The Claverings was well written, with both humour and pathos, "though I am not aware that the public has ever corroborated that verdict". In his autobiography, written in 1875–76, he lamented that "I doubt now whether anyone reads The Claverings.

Contemporary critics received the novel favourably, speaking approvingly of the moral lesson in the misery suffered by Lady Ongar after she married for money rather than love. A review in The Spectator declared that "Mr. Trollope draws with a sincerity that never fails him the true and natural punishment of her sin". The Saturday Review critic wrote that she had done "a wrong and a wicked thing", and that "she is punished just enough, and not more than enough, to vindicate the ways of society to women... Perhaps, if anything, she escapes too lightly."

Later critics also regarded the work highly. Sadleir described it as one of Trollope's five technically faultless books: "there is not a loose end, not a patch of drowsiness, not a moment of false proportion." Still more recently, David Skilton wrote that "it has been usual to pronounce it among the most perfect and attractive productions of the novelist's pen", while pointing out that by the 1980s, critics were less insistent on the formal perfection shown by The Claverings, and more receptive to "the complexities of the Victorian multiplot novel".

The novel sold well at the time of its initial publication, but has fallen from popularity since then. Skilton suggests that the volume of Trollope's production during 1866–67 may have overwhelmed critics and readers alike.

== Connections to other Trollope works ==
Although The Claverings is considered one of Trollope's "singletons", it is apparently set within the diocese of Barchester: Henry Clavering, as a clergyman, is pressured to give up fox hunting by Bishop and Mrs Proudie of the Barsetshire novels.

Archie Clavering is abetted in his courtship of Lady Ongar by his friend Captain Boodle; in The Vicar of Bullhampton (1870), there is a passing reference to "little Captain Boodle", and he briefly appears as a friend of Gerard Maule in Chapter LXIX of Phineas Redux.
