= Mary Ellen Edwards =

English painter (1838–1934)

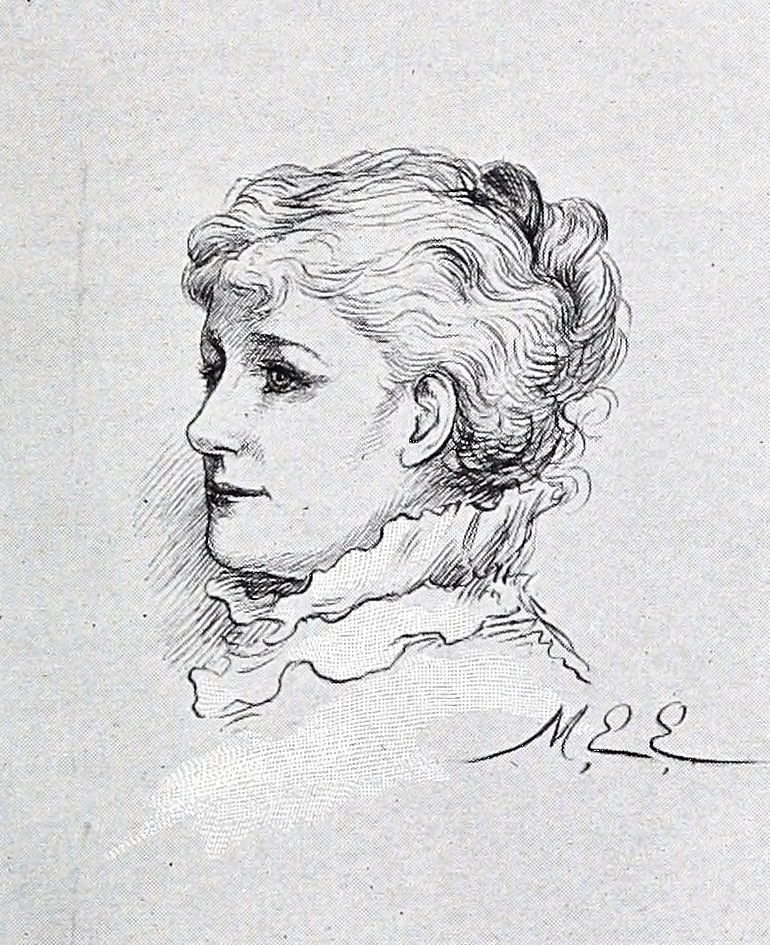
- self-portrait
- Born: 9 November 1838; Kingston upon Thames
- Died: 22 December 1934 (aged 96)
- Occupation: Illustrator
- Spouse(s): John Freer (m. 1866–1869) John Charles Staples (m. 1872)

Mary Ellen Edwards (9 November 1838 – 22 December 1934), also known as MEE, was a British artist and illustrator. She contributed to many newspapers, periodicals and children's books.

== Biography ==
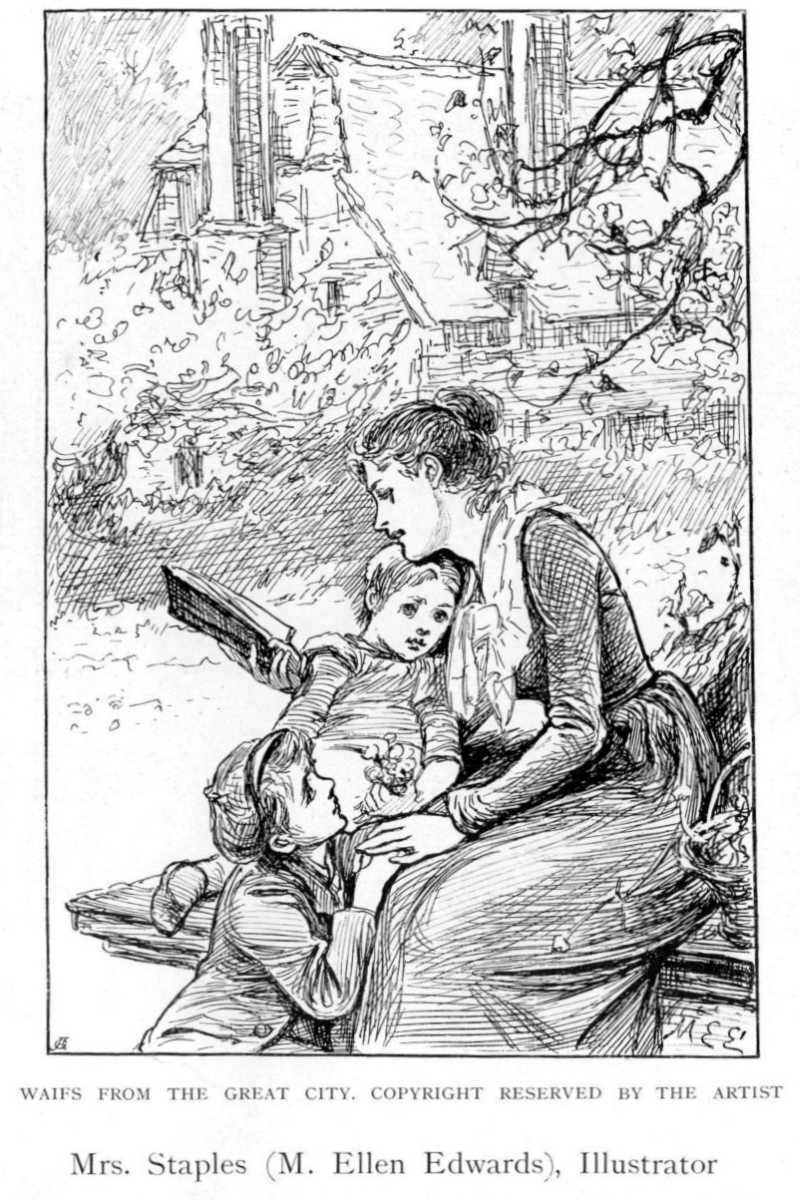
Waifs from the Great City

=== Early life ===
Mary Ellen Edwards was born the daughter of farmer Mary Johnson and Downes Edwards, a farmer and engineer who had a number of successful inventions. She was born on her father's farm in Surbiton on 9 November 1838. She came from an artistic family. Her uncle was Edward Killingworth Johnson and her mother's uncle was James Wright, both Members of the Royal Watercolour Society.

The family moved frequently. In 1848, her father built the Ravenscliffe Lodge in Douglas, Isle of Man for the family to reside in. They eventually returned to London, living in Pimlico, South Kensington and Chelsea.

On 13 June 1866, Edwards married John Freer. Freer worked for the Peninsular and Oriental Company, a steam navigation service. Edwards and Freer had one son, John E. L. Freer, born in 1867. Edward's first husband (Freer) died in 1869. At this time and over the following decade Mary Ellen was submitting her work to the annual Royal Academy shows.

In 1872 she married the artist John Charles Staples (1844–1897), with whom she worked on many projects until his death at the end of the century.

=== Education ===
Due to her location early on in life, she was unable to receive much formal training in art. She did, however, attend South Kensington School of Art for one term. She moved frequently as a child and even as an adult, preventing extended periods of education at one place.

== Career ==
She started her artistic career at an early year in the medium of watercolor. At age 12, she switched from watercolor to oil. Outside of watercolor and engraving, Edwards was a successful illustrator, drawing her works on a wooden medium.

In 1959, Checkmated, a self-made design was displayed on the cover of Illustrated Times, a weekly illustrated news magazine in Britain.

In 1862, she sent her first two major works into the Royal Academy in London, England. Her works Idle Hours and I Wandered by the Brookside were accepted and displayed. From 1864 to 1908, she sent in work every year, missing only 1873 due to illness. By 1908, she had exhibited 38 art pieces at the Royal Academy.

Her first piece that gained notoriety due to being purchased for publication, The Last Kiss, was displayed in 1865. Also purchased and subsequently engraved were her works In Memoriam and Good-bye.

She established a substantial reputation for her illustrations of Trollope's The Claverings, which was serialized in the Cornhill Magazine from 1866 to 1867. She illustrated many children's books, including That Boy of Northcott's by Charles Lever, many of which were printed in Cornhill as well. From 1869 to 1880 she was on the staff of The Graphic. Throughout her lengthy career, she worked for the Cornhill Magazine, the Illustrated Times, the Graphic, Belgravia, Churchman, Argosy, and Good Works.

Outside of her nearly-annual submissions to the Royal Academy, she exhibited four works at the Royal Society of British Artists, one work at the Royal Scottish Academy, eight works at the Royal Glasgow Institute, two works at the British Institution, and nine works at the Society of Women Artists. She contributed to exhibits at the Dudley Gallery in both watercolor and in black and white while her work was also exhibited in galleries in France.

Her illustration Waifs from the Great City was included in the 1905 book Women Painters of the World.

== Style and influence ==
Mary Ellen Edwards worked and lived in both the 19th and early 20th centuries. Due to the prevailing social climate of the time, she was not very popular among a society that viewed her art through the traditional male lens. She focused more on illustrations that conveyed emotion in a social setting, and she was extremely successful at it. Furthermore, many of her works revolve around social settings with groups of people. She was exceptional at illustrating emotion in her work, and her pieces are very powerful and easy to understand. Unfortunately her style did not catch on among the broad population due to her status as a member of "feminine art"; her works were often viewed as "feminine", "sentimental", and "domestic": rarely equitably compared with her male counterparts.

=== Example of book illustration by Edwards ===
The following illustrations were painted by Edwards for Through the Meadows (1885) by Frederic Edward Weatherly (1848-1929). As well as the 24 colour illustrations by Edwards, there were as many silluoutes by John C. Staples. These images are by courtesy of the Osborne Collection of Early Children's Books at the Toronto Public Library.

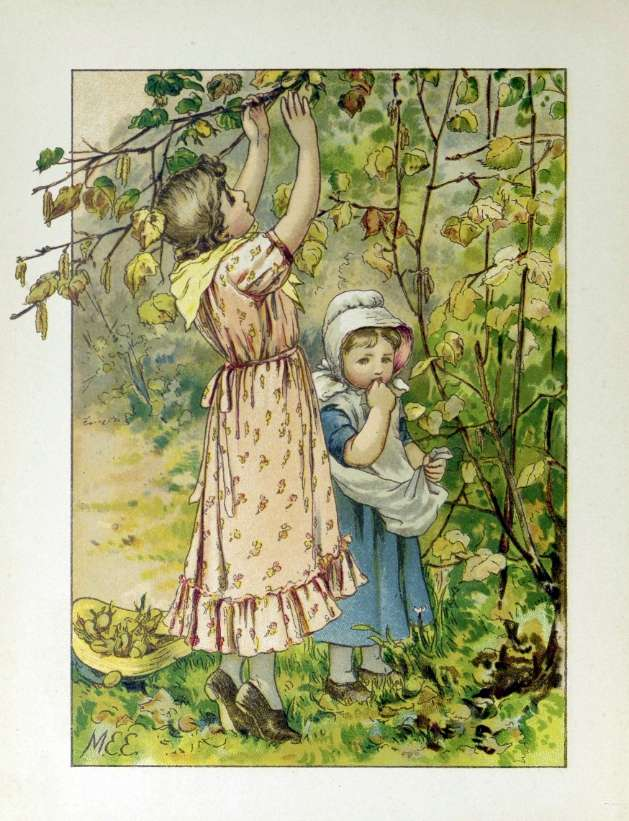
Page 6

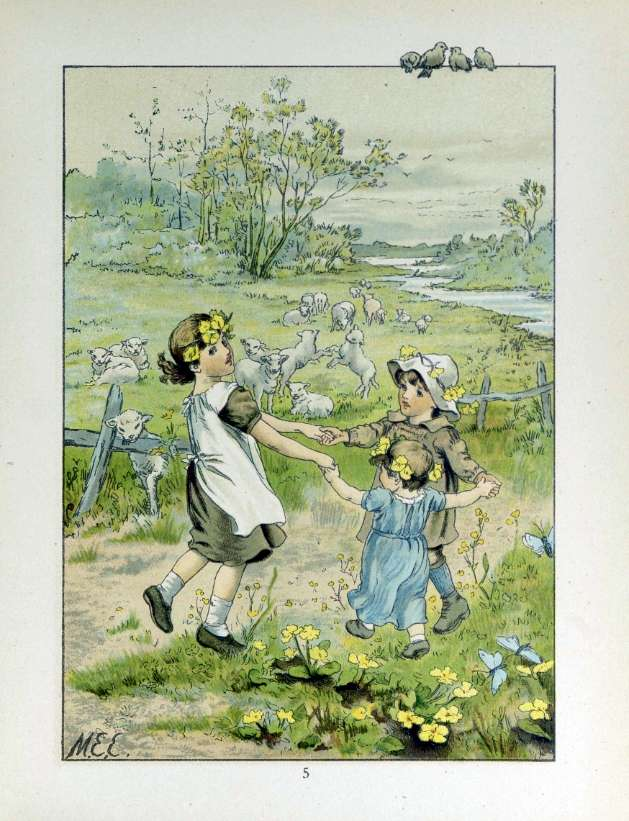
Page 9

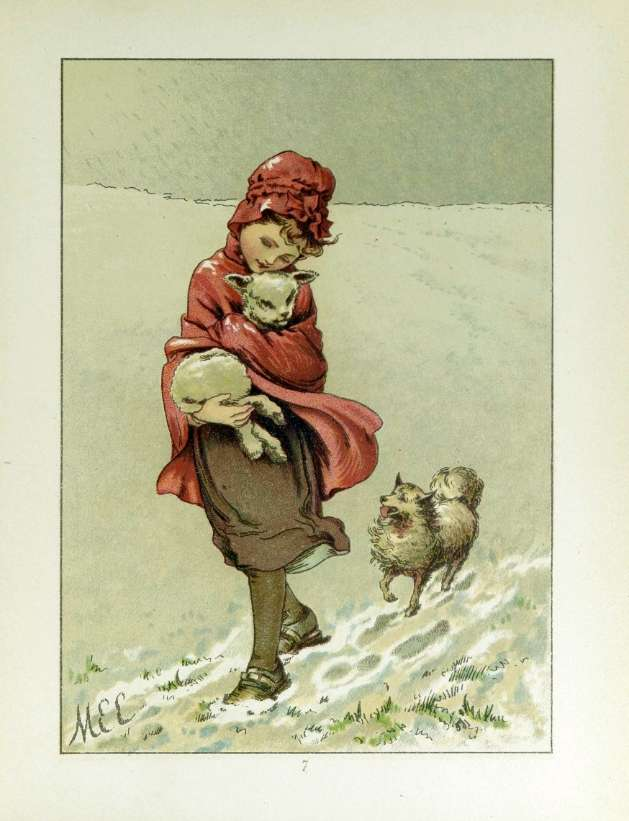
Page 11

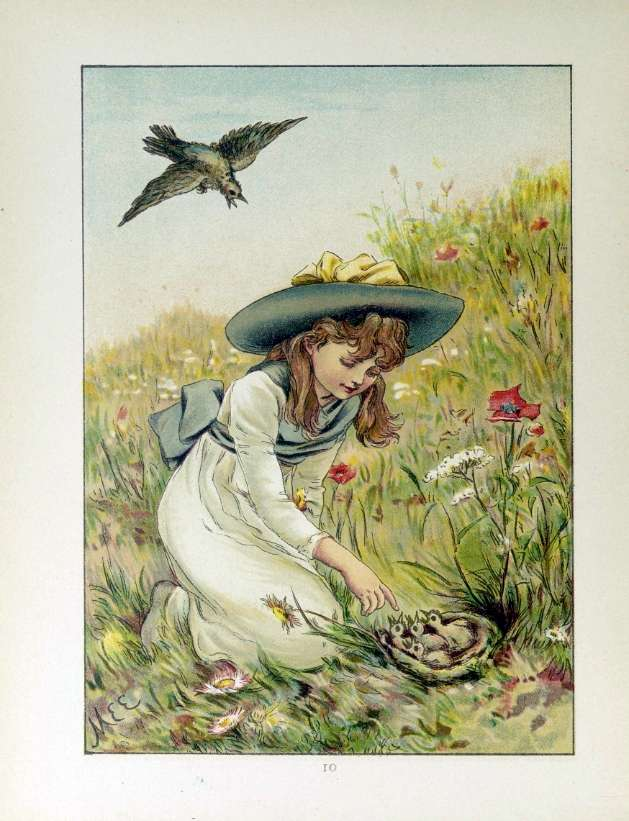
Page 14

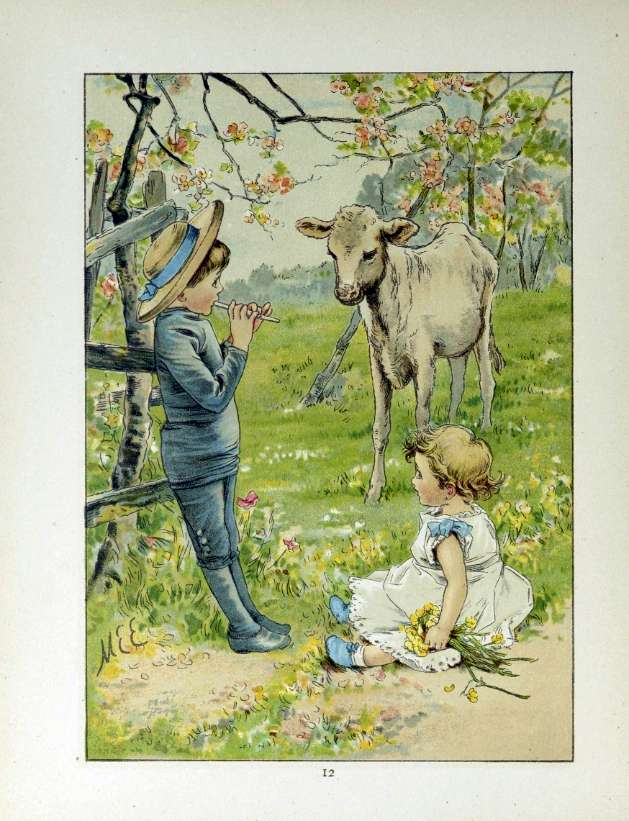
Page 16

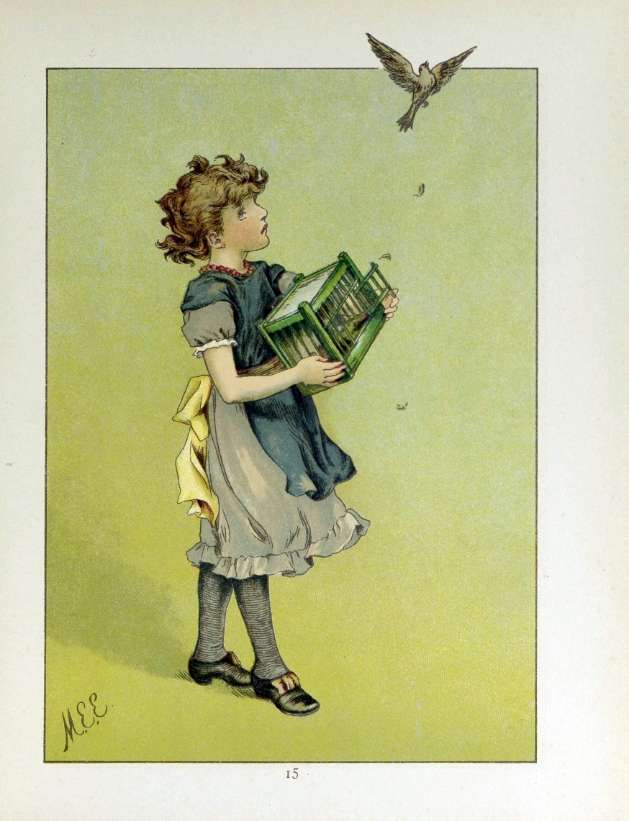
Page 19

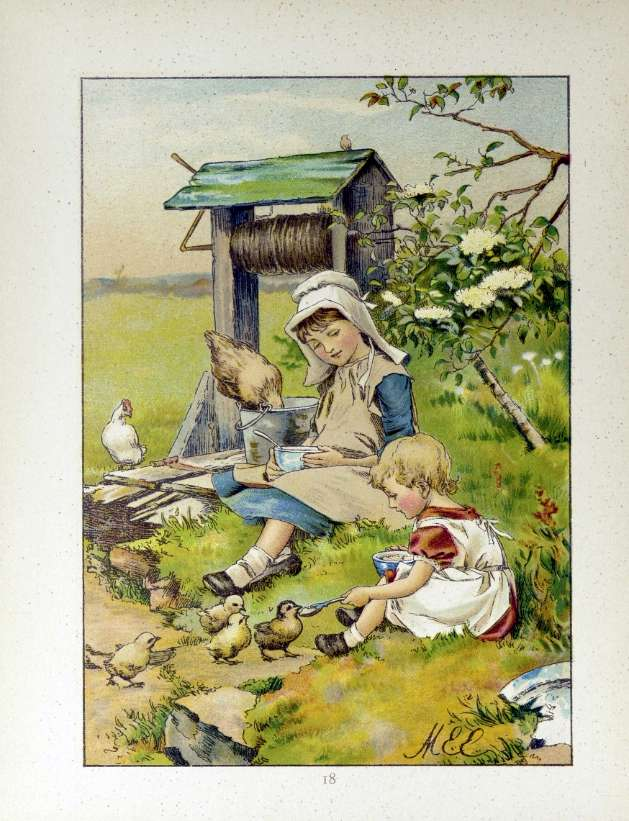
Page 22

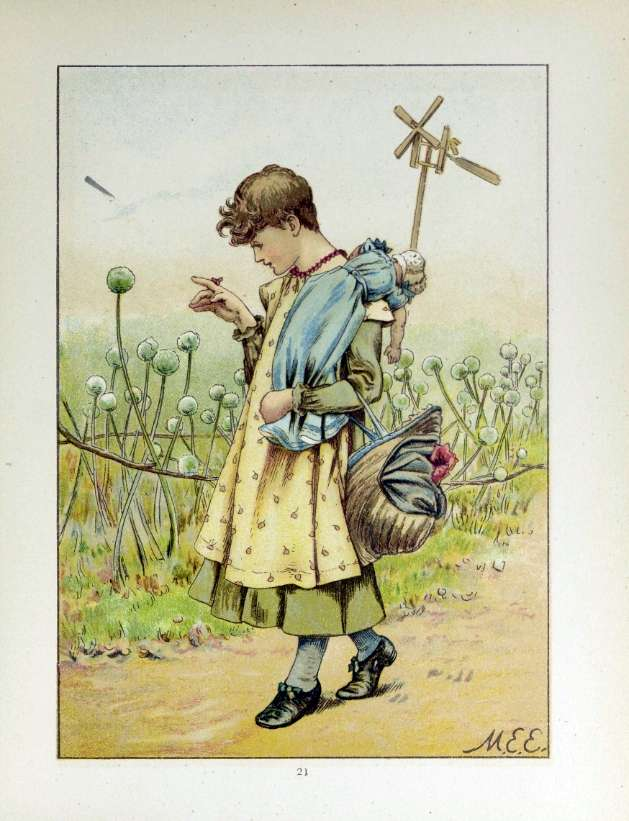
Page 25

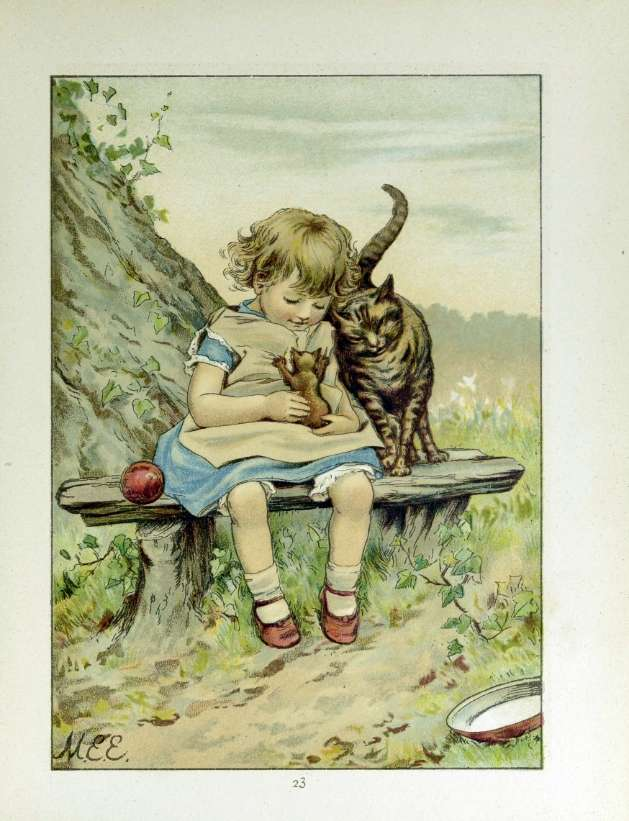
Page 27

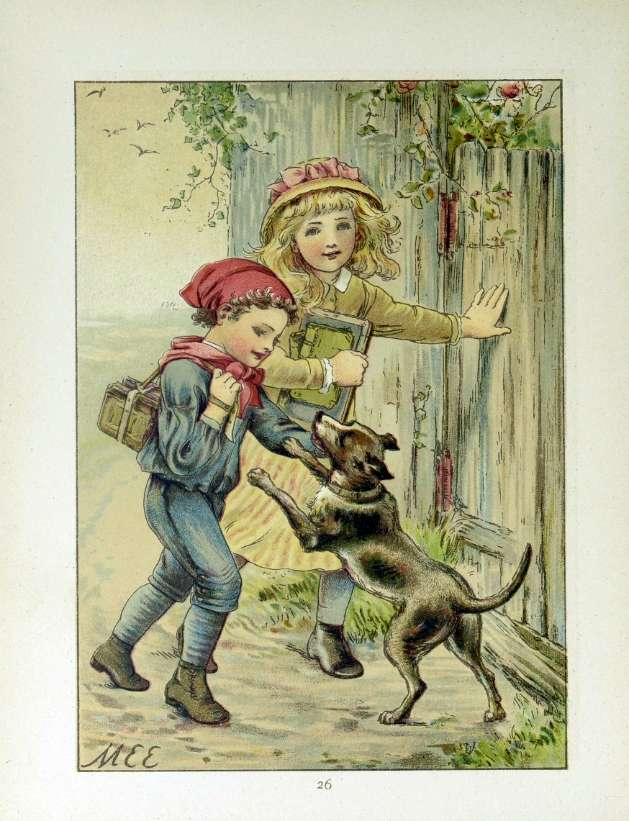
Page 30

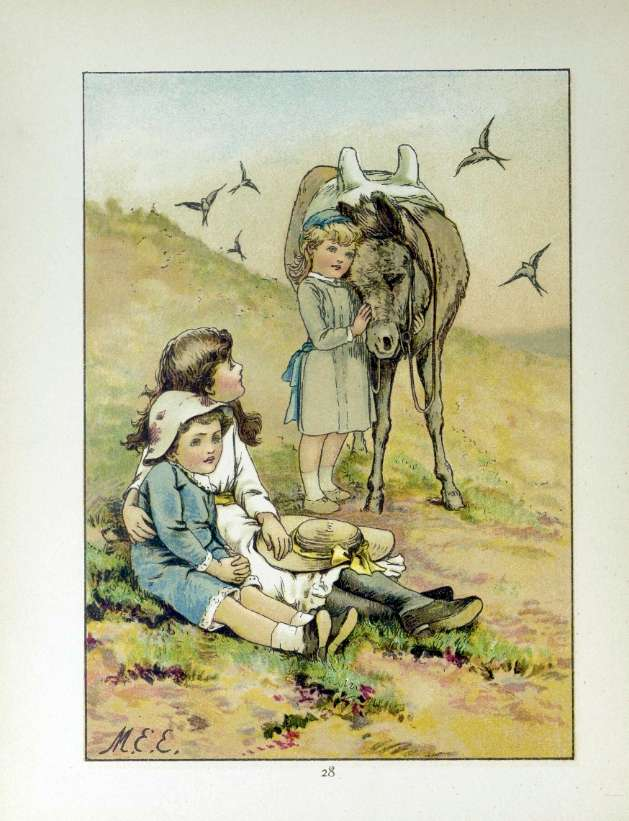
Page 32

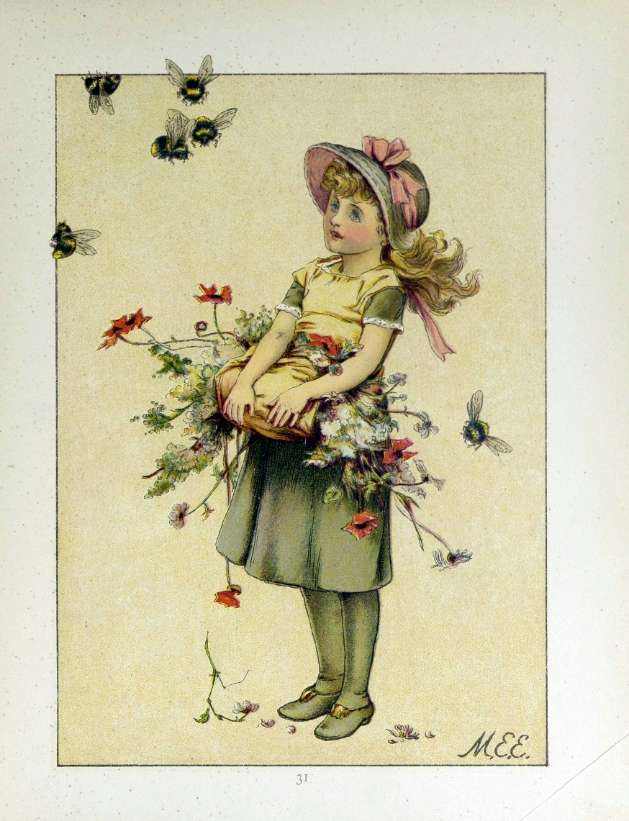
Page 35

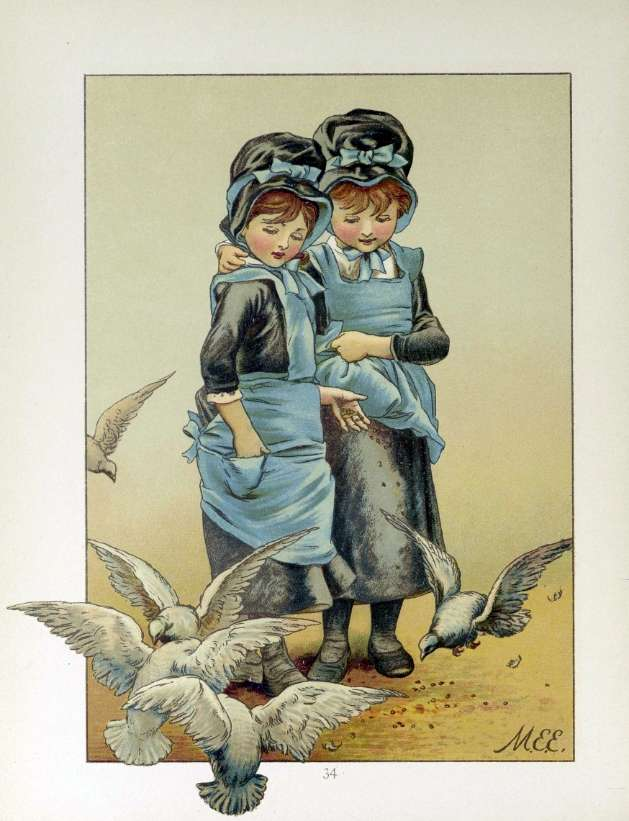
Page 38

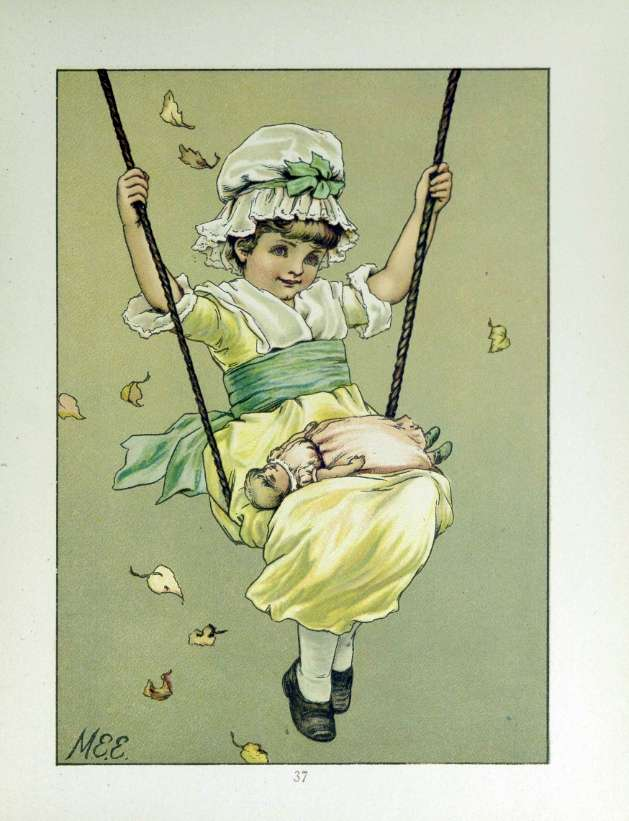
Page 41

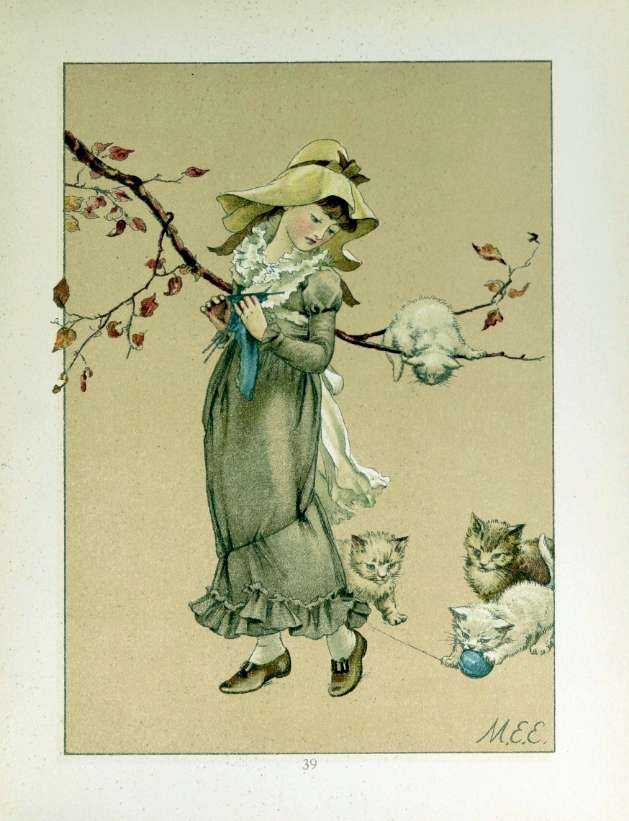
Page 43

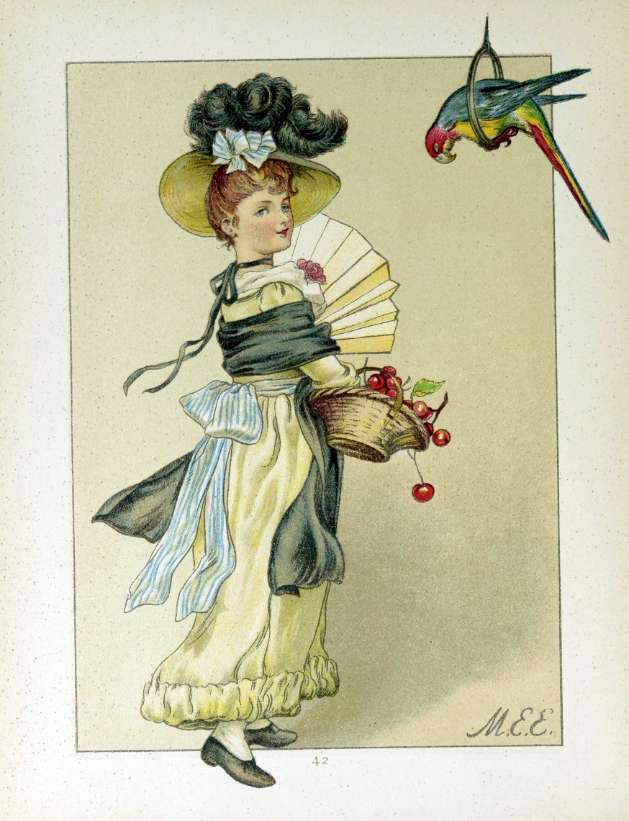
Page 46

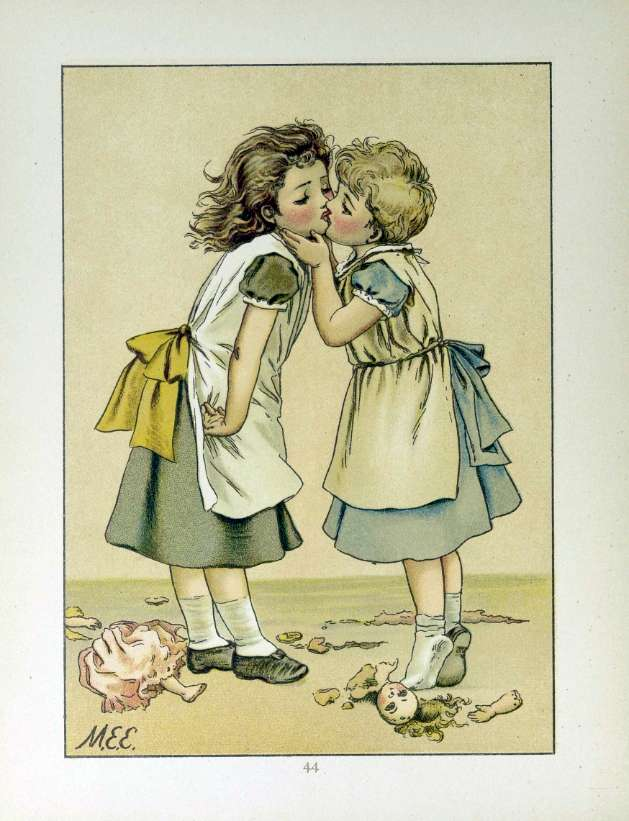
Page 48

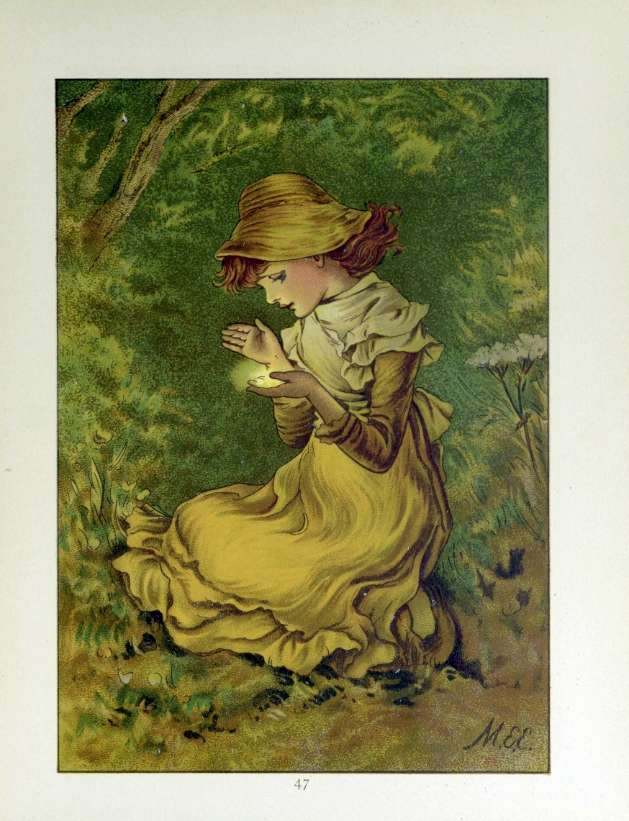
Page 51

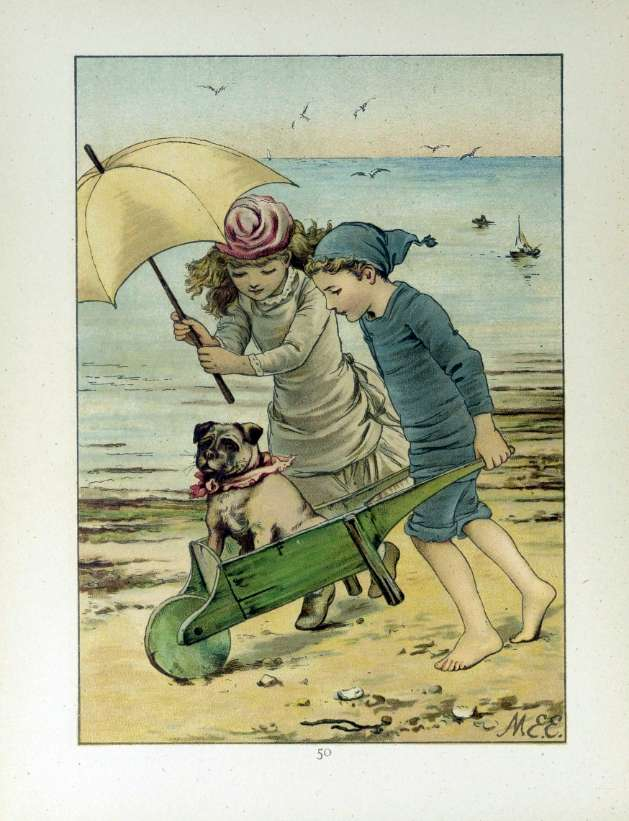
Page 54

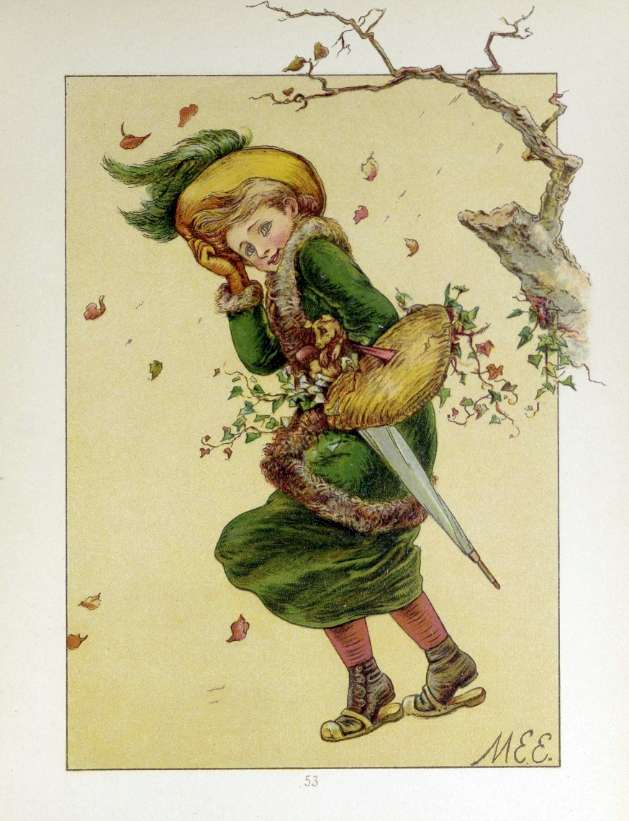
Page 57

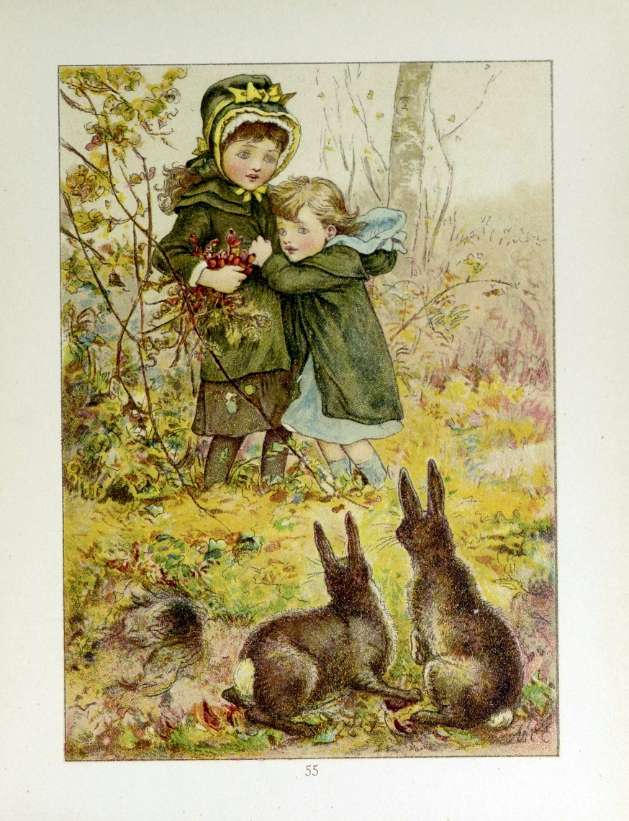
Page 59

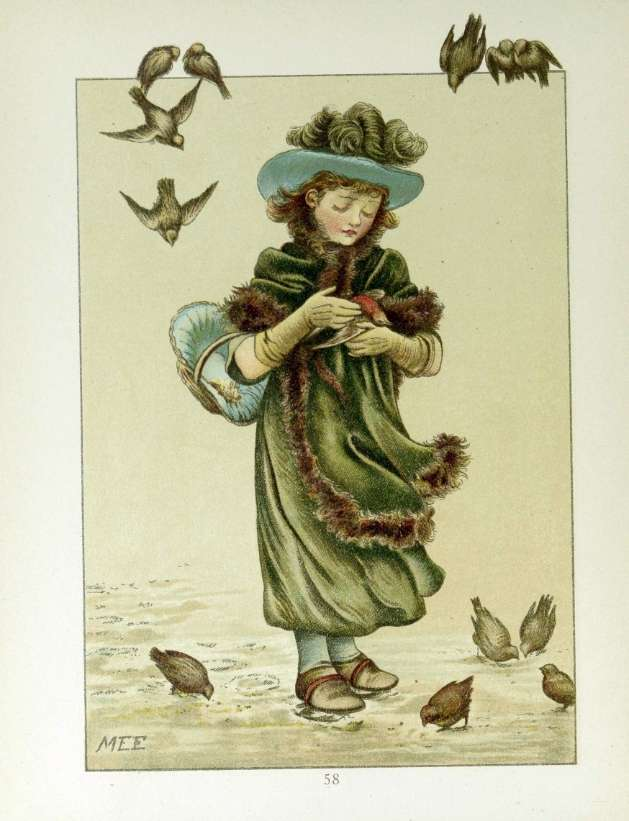
Page 62

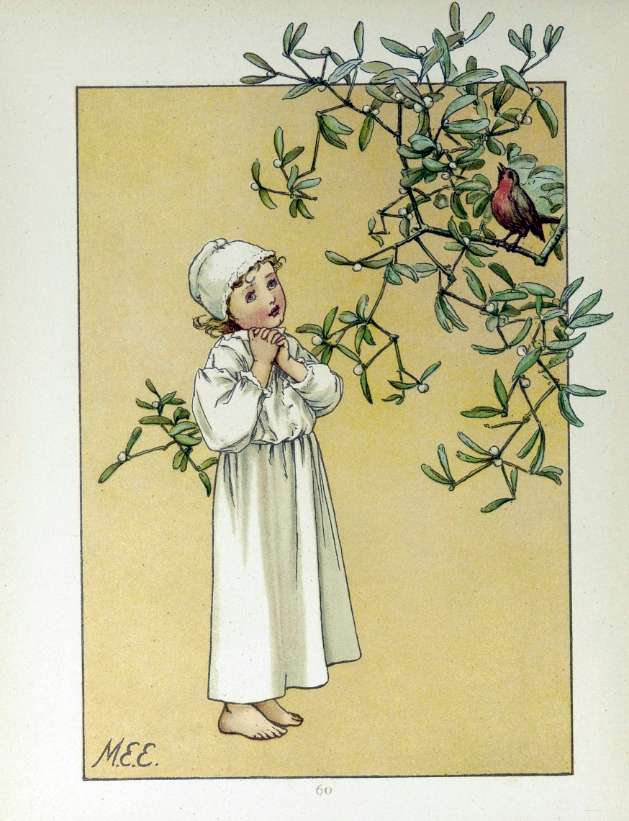
Page 64

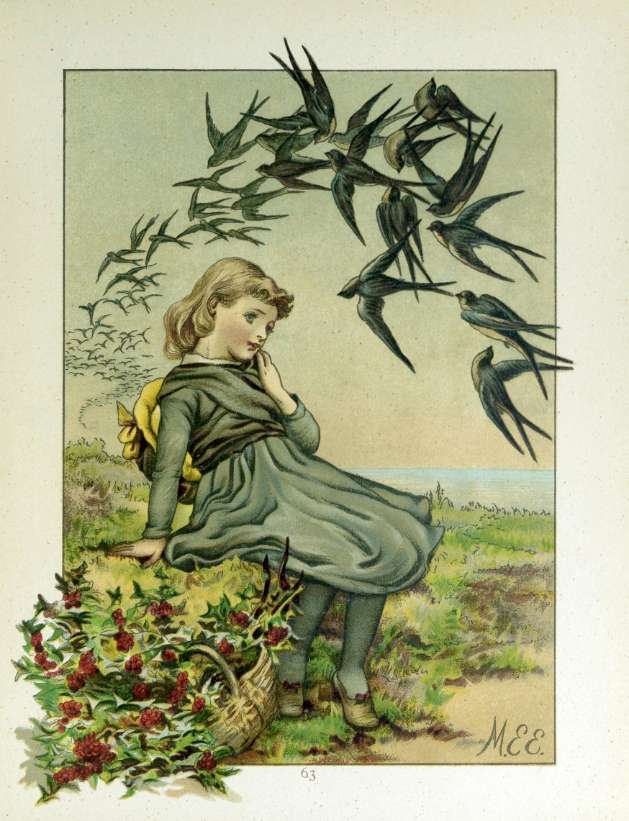
Page 67

== Artistic works ==
- Idle Hours
- I Wandered by the Brookside
- The Last Kiss
- In Memoriam
- Good-bye
- Checkmated
- That Boy of Northcott's (illustrated)
- Pleading for Peace
- The Old Church Path
- Rosalind and Celia
- The Dance of Death
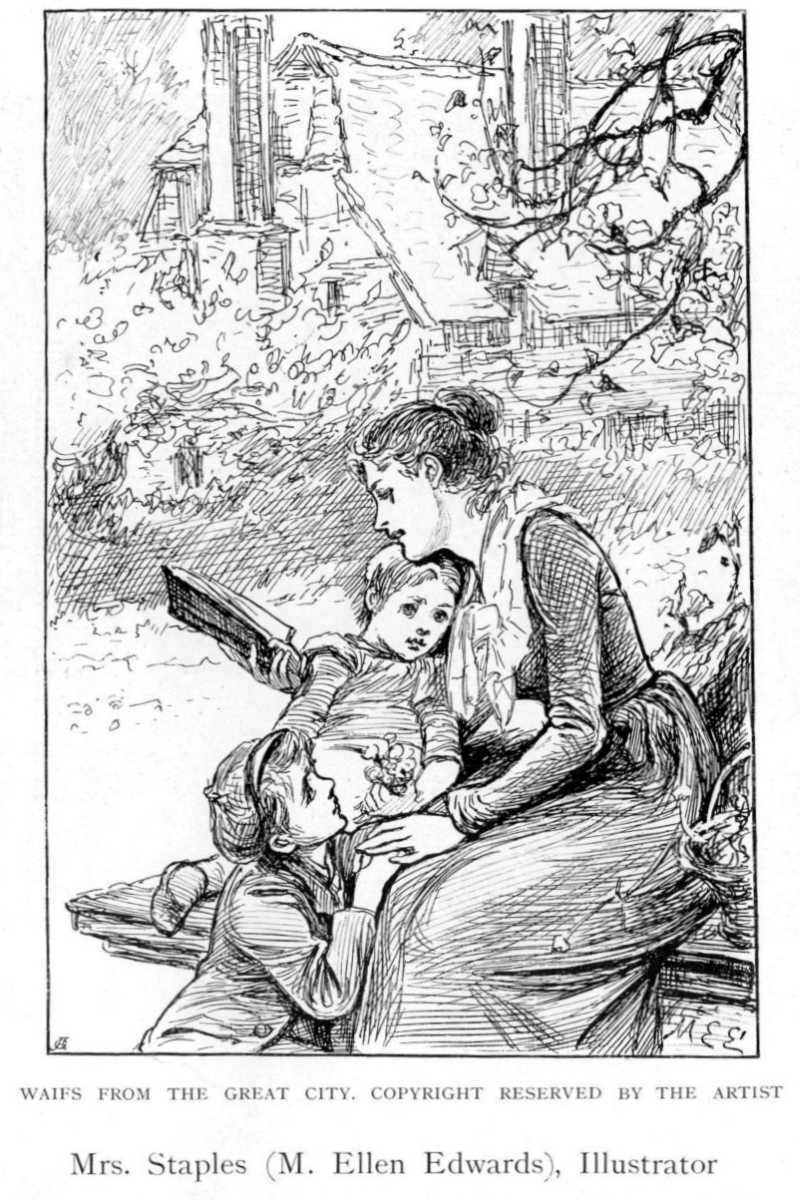
  Waifs from the Great City
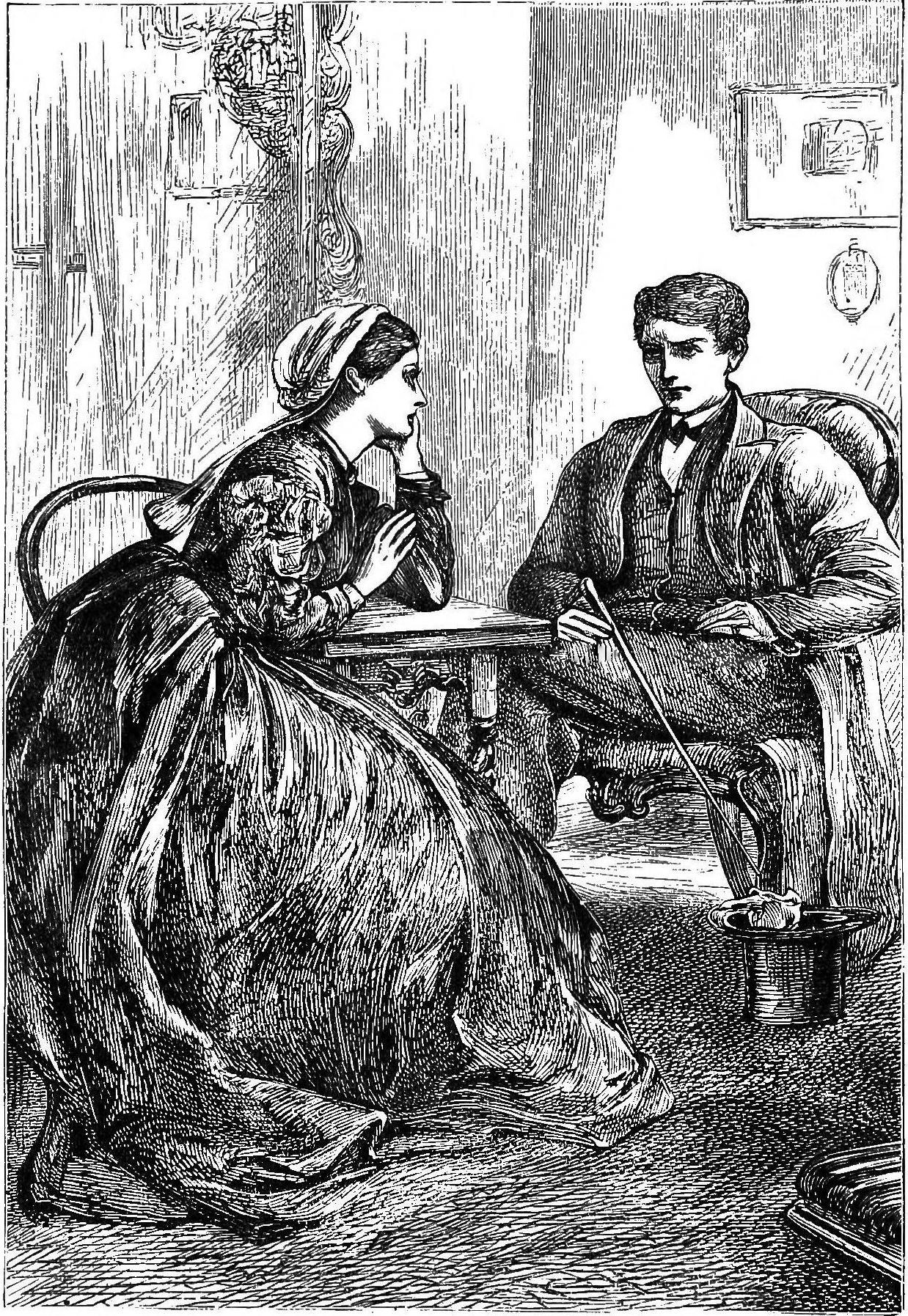
  The Claverings
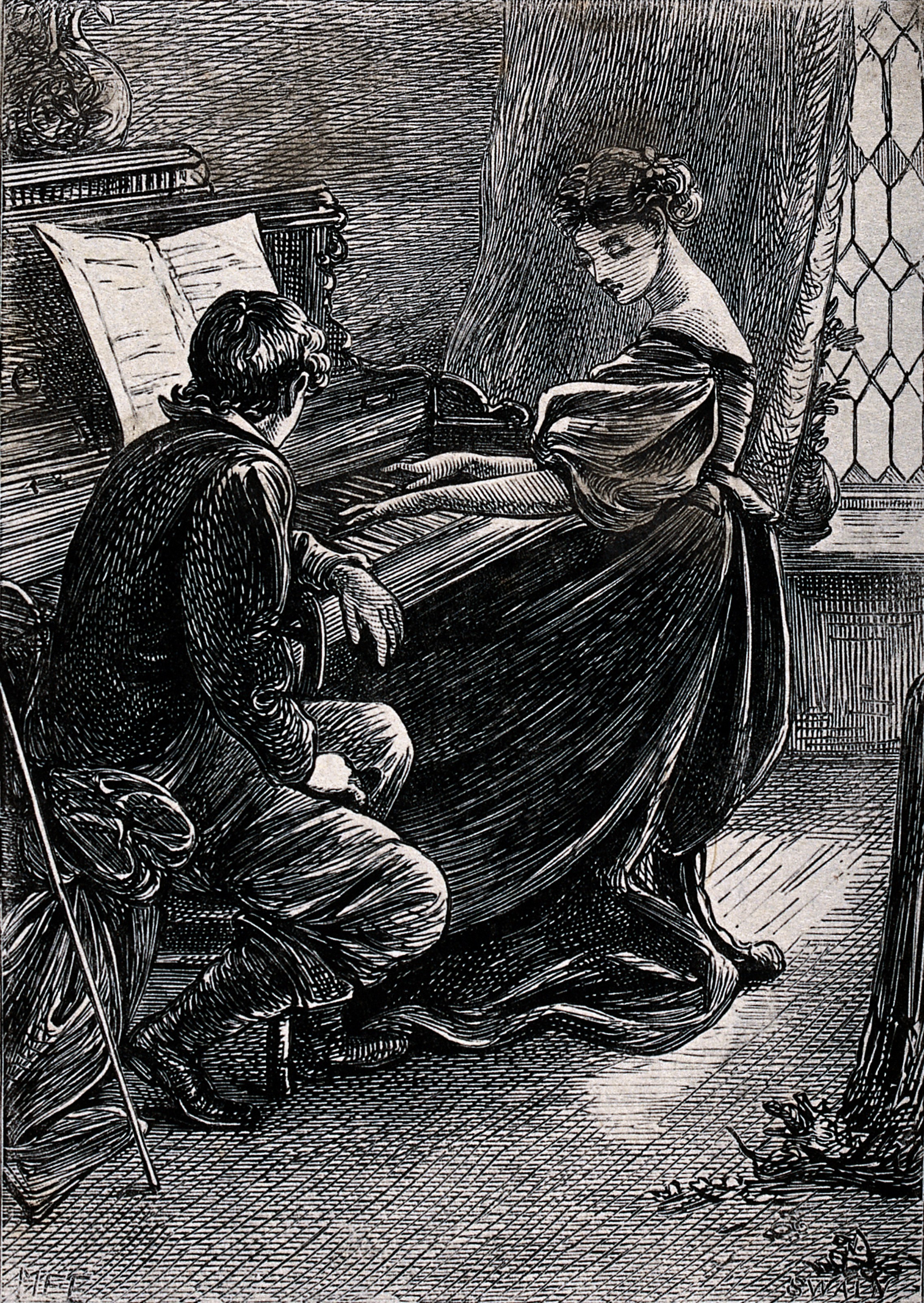
