= The American Senator =

1877 novel by Anthony Trollope

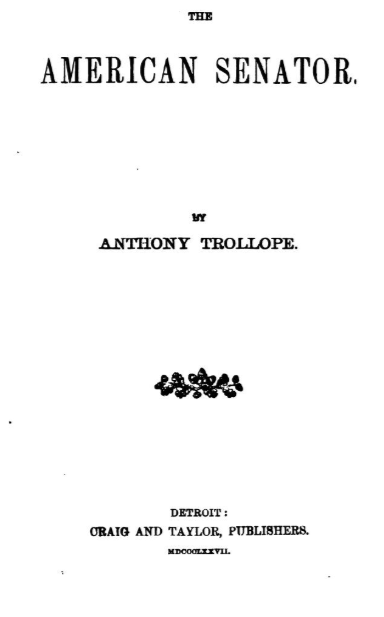
- Title page for The American Senator (1877)
- Author: Anthony Trollope
- Language: English
- Genre: Satirical
- Publisher: Chapman & Hall
- Publication date: May 1876 to July 1877; 3 volumes, 1877
- Publication place: United Kingdom
- Media type: Serialized; print

The American Senator is a novel written in 1877 by Anthony Trollope. Although not one of Trollope's better-known works, it is notable for its depictions of rural English life and for its many detailed fox hunting scenes. In its anti-heroine, Arabella Trefoil, it presents a scathing but ultimately sympathetic portrayal of a woman who has abandoned virtually all scruples in her quest for a husband. Through the eponymous Senator, Trollope offers comments on the irrational aspects of English life.

== Plot ==
The novel is largely set in and near the town of Dillsborough, in the fictional county of Rufford. The two principal subplots centre on the courtship behaviour of two young women.

The heroine, Mary Masters, is the daughter of an attorney, and has been raised as a gentlewoman. Her stepmother is from a lower social order; believing it best for Mary, she pressures her strongly to accept a proposal from Lawrence Twentyman, a prosperous young yeoman farmer with aspirations to gentility. While Mary respects Twentyman for his excellent qualities, she feels that she cannot love him as a wife should a husband. She admires Reginald Morton, whose cousin is the squire of Bragton and thus one of the two major landowners of Rufford. Reginald admires Mary as well; but for most of the novel, each is ignorant of the other's feelings: Mary, as a gentlewoman, cannot take the initiative in such a matter; and Reginald, misinformed that Mary loves another, is unwilling to make an offer and have it rejected.

The anti-heroine of the novel is Arabella Trefoil. Her father is cousin to the Duke of Mayfair; her mother was a banker's daughter. Her parents are unofficially separated, and living in straitened circumstances. Arabella and her mother, Lady Augustus Trefoil, have no fixed abode; they wander from place to place, visiting people who cannot refuse them without creating social awkwardness. At Lady Augustus's direction, Arabella has spent many years struggling to secure a rich husband who will give her and her mother high social standing, an assured income, and a house of their own. She has lately become provisionally engaged to John Morton, the squire of Bragton and a rising figure in the Foreign Office. He would be an adequate but not outstanding husband by her standards; and when the opportunity presents itself, she attempts to entrap the wealthy and titled young Lord Rufford, concealing these attempts from Morton so that she can accept his proposal should they fail.

John Morton falls ill and dies. Arabella, who is not altogether wicked, visits him at his deathbed despite the fact that this will assist Lord Rufford in escaping her toils. After Morton's death, she accepts an offer of marriage from Mounser Green, a Foreign Office clerk who is taking Morton's place as ambassador-designate to Patagonia. Like Morton, Green is not a brilliant match for her, but an acceptable one. John Morton's death makes Reginald Morton the squire of Bragton; at this point, when Mary Masters fears that he has moved too far above her in status, he confesses his love to her. A proposal ensues and is eagerly accepted.

The American senator of the title is Elias Gotobed, who sits in the US Senate for the fictional state of Mikewa. The guest of John Morton, Senator Gotobed is trying to learn about England and the English. Through his often-tactless remarks in conversation, through his letters to a friend in America, and through a lecture in London titled "The Irrationality of Englishmen", he comments on British justice and government, the Church of England, the custom of primogeniture, and other aspects of English life.

== Major themes ==
=== England, America, and utilitarianism ===
In Senator Gotobed, Trollope employs a device similar to that used by Montesquieu in the Lettres Persanes and by Goldsmith in The Citizen of the World. As an outsider, he comments on the absurd or irrational aspects of English society. Gotobed finds much at fault with his host country: the sale of livings in the Church of England, the sale of commissions in the British army, the custom of primogeniture, the unelected hereditary House of Lords and the lack of proportional representation in the House of Commons, and a system that defers to the wealthy and titled at the expense of justice to those of lower social standing.

It is difficult to know the extent to which Gotobed's views reflected Trollope's own. On the one hand, the Senator's denunciations of clerical livings were very similar to criticisms that Trollope had levelled at Bishop Wilberforce. On the other, some of Gotobed's strongest strictures were directed at fox-hunting, to which Trollope was devoted.

Late in 1876, Trollope wrote: "[Gotobed] is a thoroughly honest man wishing to do good, and is not himself half so absurd as the things which he criticises." The novel was written and set during the scandals of Ulysses S. Grant's administration. The dishonest politician was a stock figure in American novels of the time; and Trollope himself had noted the ubiquity of corruption on his postal mission to Washington in 1868. Yet Gotobed is an honourable man, and Trollope apparently tried to avoid making a caricature of him, notwithstanding a few quaint Americanisms and episodes of tobacco-chewing.

The key is a character's telling the Senator that his views are "utilitarian rather than picturesque" and his lecture's title: "The Irrationality of Englishmen". To Trollope, the English system was strong precisely because it was picturesque rather than logical, and should not be criticised or adjusted according to utilitarian theories. Fox-hunting was one of the strongest illustrations of this. In Ruth apRoberts' words, "The Senator is too much the rationalist ever to enjoy something he could not think he understood; and Trollope is too much the empiricist to deny the existence of his joy or his sure sense of its beneficence. But he very well knew the absurd aspects of hunting."

=== English social order ===
To Trollope, one of the pillars of the English system was a traditional social order in which everyone played his appropriate role. The place of the squire was to occupy his land. Dillsborough is portrayed as slowly declining, a decline that is associated with the long absence of its squire, John Morton. When Reginald Morton, as the new squire, takes up residence at Bragton, the long decline shows signs of coming to an end. The new squire also promises to accept the traditional role and responsibilities: although educated in Germany and given more to study than to the traditional pursuits of a country gentleman, at the novel's end he deprecates the philanthropists who attack fox-hunting, and vows to take up the pursuit himself.

=== Women, courtship, and marriage ===
Much of The American Senator is taken up with the parallel courtships of Mary Masters and Arabella Trefoil. There is a physical and moral contrast between them: Mary is dark, honest, and sincere; Arabella is blonde, embellished with pearl powder, paint, and false hair, and insincere. Each is urged to give her heart falsely for the sake of a prosperous marriage: Arabella by her mother, Mary by her stepmother. Arabella obeys her mother, in the process coming to despise her; Mary refuses to obey her stepmother, and the two are reconciled at the novel's end.

The parallels extend to the mother figures. Both Mrs. Masters and Lady Augustus married men who were above them socially, and both brought money to the marriage. Mrs. Masters was the daughter of an ironmonger who married an attorney; her dowry of £1000 "had been very useful" to her new husband. Lady Augustus was the daughter of a banker who married the impecunious younger son of a duke; to further the parallel, malicious gossip makes her the daughter of an ironmonger as well.

It may have been Trollope's intention to make Mary good and Arabella evil. "I wished to express the depth of my scorn for women who run down [pursue] husbands," he wrote to Mary Holmes. Arabella has been described as a feminine counterpart to Augustus Melmotte of The Way We Live Now or Ferdinand Lopez of The Prime Minister: she engages in courtship as those two engaged in financial speculation.

However, Trollope's native sympathy intruded. A few months later, he wrote: "I have known the woman... all the traits, all the cleverness, all the patience, all the courage, all the self-abnegation,—and all the failure... Will such a one as Arabella Trefoil be damned, and if so why? Think of her virtues; how she works, how true she is to her vocation, how little there is of self indulgence, or of idleness. I think that she will go to a kind of third class heaven in which she will always be getting third class husbands."

Far from an object of contempt, Arabella becomes a tragic figure. Her rank demands that she marry well; her financial situation makes such a marriage virtually impossible. In this position, she cannot afford love or sincerity. Hers is "the tragedy of a young woman who recognises decency, but who feels herself trapped into a life that excludes decent behaviour."

Arabella has been badly schooled by her mother; Mary was more fortunate in having been raised by Lady Ushant of the Morton family, who taught her principles that allowed her to resist her stepmother's mercenary urgings. Yet Lady Augustus is no more pure villain than her daughter. With no mother to take care of her, she found herself married to a man who squandered her dowry. She is working to achieve for her daughter the security of which she was robbed in her own marriage. Her own reward for this long arduous struggle is a scant one: after Arabella's wedding, "[s]he knew she was an old woman, without money, without blood, and without attraction, whom nobody would ever desire to see."

== Development history ==
From 1827–1831, Trollope's mother Frances Trollope lived in the United States, attempting to repair the family's fortunes and observing all aspects of the nation. Upon her return to England, she published Domestic Manners of the Americans in 1832. Mrs. Trollope strongly criticised the country and its customs: "I do not like them. I do not like their principles, I do not like their manners, I do not like their opinions." The American press responded with strongly negative reviews of Domestic Manners.

Trollope fils visited the United States from September 1861 to March 1862 He published the two-volume North America in May 1862. The book was critical of the country; but unlike Domestic Manners, was written with an evident desire to please, and never patronised. The American reaction was generally positive.

Gotobed, told that it might not have been wise to tell the English nation of its collective faults, replies "You English tell us of ours pretty often." Trollope was evidently referring to his and his mother's criticisms of the United States, as well as those of Charles Dickens in American Notes and Martin Chuzzlewit; and he may have thought it only just to present criticism of English institutions from an American standpoint.

Indeed, there is much of Trollope in Gotobed's questioning, quarrelsome, and often tactless character. Richard Henry Dana Jr. later became a good friend of the author; but after their first meeting, he recorded in his diary: "...intolerable, no manners, but means well, & would do a good deal to serve you, but says the most offensive things—not a gentleman."

The origins of Arabella Trefoil are more obscure. In early 1877, Trollope wrote: "I have been, and still am very much afraid of Arabella Trefoil. The critics have to come, and they will tell me that she is unwomanly, unnatural, turgid,—the creation of a morbid imagination, striving after effect by laboured abominations. But I swear I have known the woman..." Not a particular woman, he continues; but all of the traits, good and evil.

Although there was no resemblance in character, Arabella Trefoil's houseless wanderings might be based on those of Trollope's beloved niece Beatrice "Bice" Trollope. Lacking a secure home with her father and stepmother, she was forced to resort to a "sterile round of English visits" and endured several "abortive engagements". More fortunate in matrimony than Arabella, Bice Trollope found a wealthy and well-connected husband in Charles Stuart-Wortley, whom she married in 1880 at the age of 27.

Trollope began writing the novel on 4 June 1875, while visiting his son Fred Trollope's sheep station at Mortray in New South Wales. He completed it on 24 September 1875, while en route from Australia to the United States.

=== Publication history ===
The American Senator was serialised in Temple Bar May 1876 – July 1877. A three-volume book version was released by Chapman & Hall (London) in 1877. In that same year, the novel was also published in New York, Detroit, Toronto, Leipzig, and Copenhagen. A one-volume edition was issued by Chatto & Windus (London) in 1878; this edition was re-issued in 1879 and in 1886. Later editions were published in 1931 (reprinted in 1951 and 1962), in 1940, in 1979, and in 1981.

Trollope received £1800 for the novel. He had received £3000 for The Way We Live Now in 1875, and £2500 for The Prime Minister in 1876.

== Literary significance and reception ==
Contemporary reviews of The American Senator were mixed. British reviewers, even those who regarded the book favourably, almost universally felt that Senator Gotobed and his criticisms would have been better left out of the novel. Some reviewers felt that Trollope was growing embittered: a notice in The Examiner suggested that the author was suffering an "attack of misanthropy" and accused him of maintaining a "special inkstand supplied with gall, for use when describing fashionable society, against which his rancour appears to be unbounded." Others were more favourable: a review in The Times stated that Dillsborough society was rendered in Trollope's "most entertaining manner".

Later critics took a more favourable view of the portrayal of Arabella Trefoil. In 1927, Michael Sadleir wrote: "The American Senator will be read for the sake of its opening chapters, which set before the reader in a few pages the whole geographical and social pattern of an English county; for the sake of its hunting episodes, which are among the best not only in Trollope, but in the whole of English fiction; and for the sake of Arabella Trefoil, a masterly study of a girl without a heart." More recent critics have found more sympathy for her plight: James Pope-Hennessy calls her "the finest, most fearless and the most tragic of all [Trollope's] doomed and desperate anti-heroines".

== Connections to other Trollope works ==
The Duchess of Omnium and Lady Chiltern of the Palliser novels make a brief appearance in the novel.

In chapter 70 of The Duke's Children, Senator Gotobed is the American minister in London.

Larry Twentyman and Lord Rufford both reappear, alongside more minor appearances from a few other characters, in Ayala's Angel.

There is no indication that Arabella Trefoil is related to the Dean Trefoil of Barchester Towers.

== Adaptations ==
A three-part adaptation of The American Senator was broadcast on BBC Radio 4's Classic Serial programme in 2011.
