= Khet =

Khet may refer to:

- KHET, a PBS station in Hawaii
- Khet (game), an abstract strategy game
- Heth (letter) or Khet, a letter of many Semitic alphabets
- Khet, the Thai word for district in Bangkok and in some municipalities in Thailand
- Khet, an Ancient Egyptian unit of measurement
- Khet, an Ancient Egyptian concept of the soul or spirit

== See also ==
- Kheta (disambiguation)
