= Kheta =

Kheta may refer to:

- Kheta (river), a river in Russia
- Kheta, Russia, a settlement in Taymyrsky Dolgano-Nenetsky District, Russia
- Kheta of Mewar, 14th-century Indian ruler
- Kheta Ram (born 1986), Indian athlete
- An ancient Egyptian exonym for the Hittites

== See also ==
- Khet (disambiguation)
- Heta (disambiguation)
