= Heta (disambiguation) =

Heta is a letter of the Greek alphabet.

Heta may also refer to:

- Cyclone Heta, a tropical storm of 2003–2004
- Heta Station, a railway station in Japan
- Heta River, a river in Russia
- Heta Asset Resolution, an Austrian company

== As a human name ==
- Damon Heta (born 1987), Australian darts player
- Elisapeta Heta, New Zealand Māori architect
- Heta Stewart (1869–1909), New Zealand rugby union player
- Heta Tuuri (born 1995), Finnish high jumper

== See also ==
- Hetta (disambiguation)
- Kheta (disambiguation)
- Xetá
