= Mr. Scarborough's Family =

Novel by Anthony Trollope

Mr. Scarborough's Family is a novel by English author Anthony Trollope, first published in 1883. It was his forty-fifth novel and was left incomplete at the time of his death during its serialization. The work was originally serialized in All the Year Round from 17 May 1882, to 16 June 1883.

Mr. John Scarborough, the affluent head of his family, resented the restrictions on inheritance, particularly the law of entail. The novel outlines the various schemes and legal devices used by Mr. Scarborough, and his two sons Mountjoy and Augustus, before and after of John Scarborough's death.. Trollope often used lawyers and the law as a framework to illustrate the author's projection of the gap between public respectability and less seemly private behaviour. Professor Rowland D. McMaster in his critique described Mr. Scarborough's Family as a masterpiece "lost in the sea of Trollope's plenty."
