= Rachel Ray (novel) =

1863 novel by Anthony Trollope

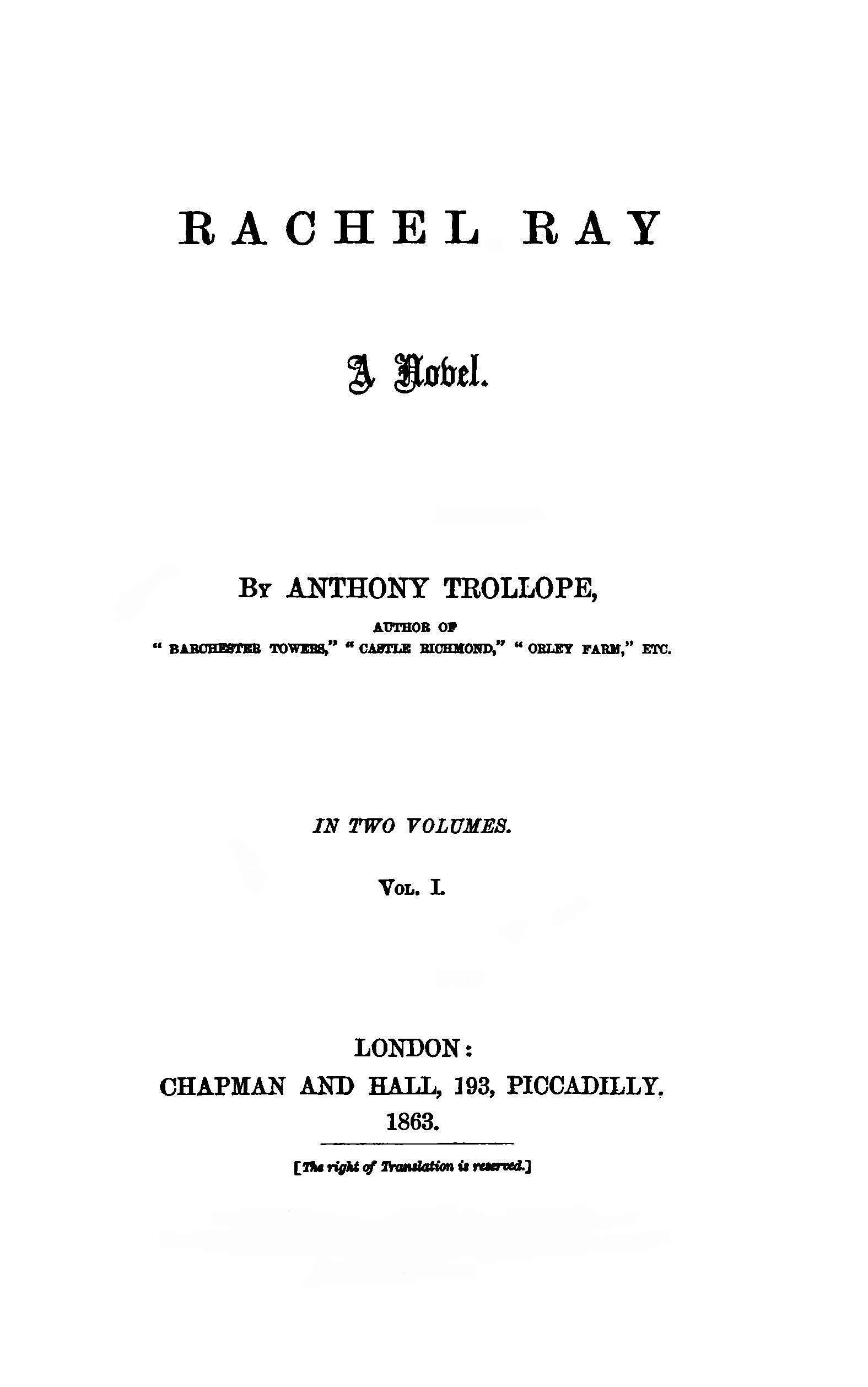
- Title page of 1863 Chapman & Hall edition
- Author: Anthony Trollope
- Language: English
- Publisher: Chapman & Hall
- Publication date: 1863
- Publication place: England
- Media type: Print (book)
- ISBN: 0-486-23930-6 (1980 Dover edition)

Rachel Ray is an 1863 novel by Anthony Trollope. It recounts the story of a young woman who is forced to give up her fiancé because of baseless suspicions directed toward him by the members of her community, including her sister and the pastors of the two churches attended by her sister and mother.

The novel was originally commissioned for Good Words, a popular magazine directed at pious Protestant readers. However, the magazine's editor, upon reading the galley proofs, concluded that the negative portrayals of the Low church and Evangelical characters would anger and alienate much of his readership. The novel was never published in serial form.

== Plot summary ==
Rachel Ray is the younger daughter of a lawyer's widow (referred to as Mrs. Ray). Rachel lives with her widowed older sister, Dorothea Prime (referred to as Mrs. Prime), and her mother in a cottage near Exeter in Devon. Mrs. Ray is amiable but weak, unable to make decisions on her own and ruled by her older daughter. Mrs. Prime is a strict and gloomy Evangelical, persuaded that all worldly joys are impediments to salvation.

Rachel is courted by Luke Rowan, a young man from London who has inherited an interest in the profitable local brewery. Mrs. Prime suspects his morals and motives, and communicates these suspicions to her mother. Mrs. Ray consults her pastor, the Low Churchman Charles Comfort; and upon his vouching for Luke, allows Rachel to attend a ball where Luke will be present.

At the ball, Luke dances multiple times with Rachel and indicates how much he likes her. The next day, he pays a call on Mrs. Ray and requests permission to court Rachel. Mrs. Ray is favorable impressed with Luke and consents to the request. He then meets with Rachel, proposes to her, and she accepts.

Soon after this, Luke falls into a dispute with the senior proprietor of the brewery, Mr. Tappitt, and travels to London to seek legal advice. While he is away, he writes a love letter to Rachel. Meanwhile, rumours circulate (largely coming from the Tappitt family) about Luke's conduct in Devon, for example, that he fled town while owing money. Comfort believes the rumours, and advises Mrs. Ray against permitting a Rachel-Luke correspondence until the young man's character can be established. Rachel obeys her mother's instructions to write Luke only once, in a somewhat cold, formal tone, as if to release him from the engagement. When he fails to reply to her letter or return to Devon, she grows increasingly depressed.

A subplot involves the abortive courtship of Mrs. Prime by her pastor, Samuel Prong. He is a zealous but intolerant Evangelical. His religious beliefs are in agreement with hers—and he also disapproves of Luke—but Prong and Mrs. Prime have incompatible notions of marriage: he insists on a husband's authority over his wife, and in particular over the income from her first husband's estate; Mrs. Prime wants to retain control of her money, and is otherwise unwilling to submit to a husband's rule.

Eventually, Luke returns to Devon, and the dispute over the brewery is settled to his satisfaction. The disparaging rumors about him are retracted. He calls upon the Rays and assures Rachel that his love for her is still strong. She assents to his renewed proposal. Marital bliss ensues.

== Major themes ==
James Pope-Hennessy described Rachel Ray as "Trollope's tirade against the West Country evangelical clergy". Like his mother, Frances Trollope, who had caricatured them in her Vicar of Wrexhill, Anthony Trollope had no fondness for Evangelicals. In the novel, Samuel Prong, like Obadiah Slope of Barchester Towers, has an ill-favored appearance, pursues marriage for money rather than love, and is "not a gentleman". Mrs. Prime is morose and motivated by a love of power; her Dorcas Society lieutenant, Miss Pucker, is a sour gossip-mongering spinster with a disfiguring squint. Rachel's happiness is threatened by the machinations of the Evangelical characters, and the intervention of two of her non-Evangelical neighbours is critical in salvaging it.

== Development and publication history ==
=== Good Words ===
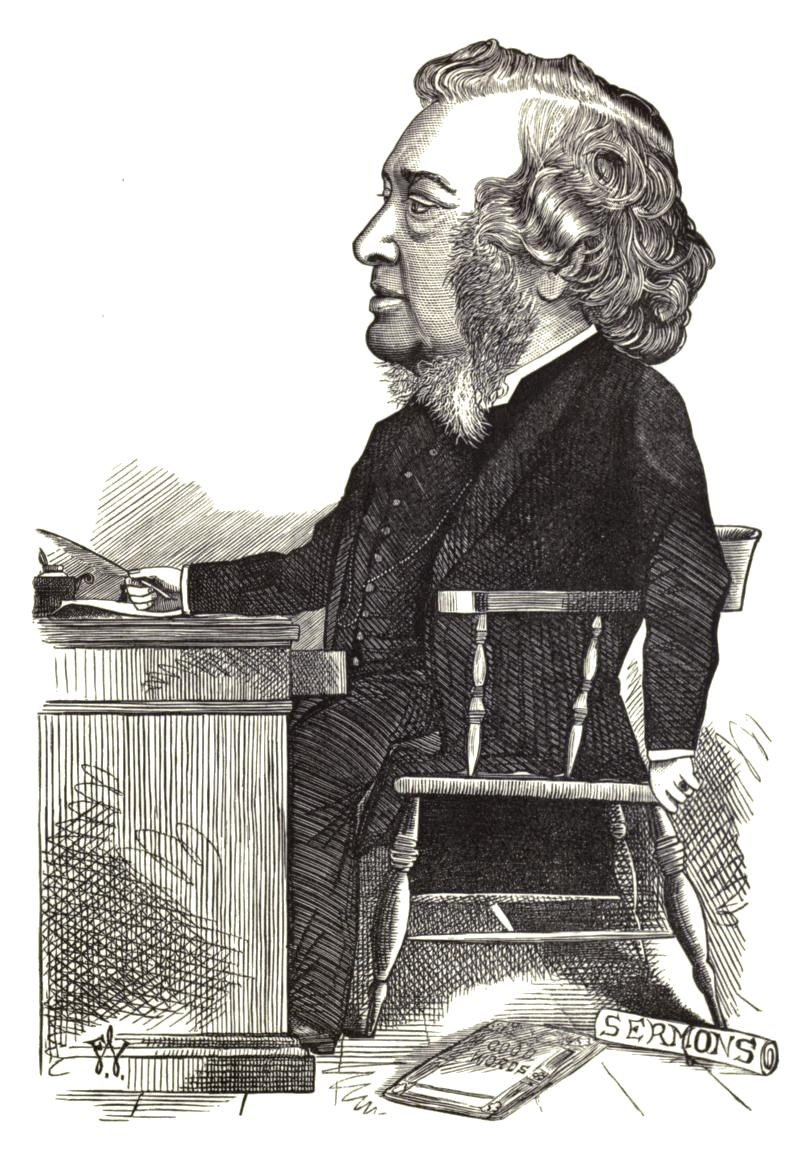
Norman Macleod

In 1862, when Trollope was near the peak of his reputation, he was approached by Norman Macleod. A well-known Scottish Presbyterian pastor and chaplain to Queen Victoria, Macleod was a personal friend of Trollope's and a fellow member of the Garrick Club. However, he wrote to Trollope in his capacity as the editor of the sixpenny monthly Good Words.

Good Words, established in 1860 by Scottish publisher Alexander Strahan, was directed at Evangelicals and Nonconformists, particularly of the lower middle class. The magazine included overtly religious material, but also fiction and nonfiction articles on general subjects, including science; the standard for content was that the devout must be able to read it on Sundays without sin. In 1863, it had a circulation of 70,000.

Strahan and Macleod sought a novel from Trollope for serialisation in the magazine in 1863. According to Trollope's autobiography, he initially demurred, but yielded when Macleod persisted. A deal was struck: Trollope would write a novel for the magazine, for serial publication in the second half of 1863; Strahan would pay £1000 for the serial rights. For an additional £100, Trollope would write a Christmas story for publication in the January 1863 issue.

Trollope's "The Widow's Mite" duly appeared in the January issue. Strahan advertised the forthcoming serialisation of the new novel, to be illustrated by John Everett Millais, who had illustrated Framley Parsonage for Cornhill Magazine. Trollope wrote Rachel Ray between 3 March and 29 June 1863.

=== Attack of the Record ===
In April 1863, however, the Calvinist Evangelical Anglican weekly Record launched a six-article series attacking Macleod and Good Words. It accused Macleod of attempting to reconcile God and Mammon, labelled Trollope "this year's chief sensation writer", and of his writing, declared, "In some of these trashy tales the most ungodly sentiments are uttered and left to work their evil effects upon the young mind".

Trollope was probably an incidental target of the Record's attack, which was directed principally at Macleod. The Disruption of 1843, in which nearly half of the clergy and laity of the Church of Scotland had left that body to form the Free Church of Scotland, had created lasting enmity between the members of the two churches. Macleod was the object of particular derision among Free Churchmen, as one of the "Forty Thieves": a group of ministers who had sought a compromise between the seceding Evangelical faction and the remaining Moderates, and who had refused to join the secession, pleading the importance of maintaining the Established church. This Free Church animosity was involved in the attack on Good Words: although the Record was staunchly Anglican, investigation by other journals revealed that the author of the anonymous articles was Thomas Alexander, a Presbyterian minister who had aligned himself with the Free Church during the Disruption.

The controversy did no harm to the circulation of Good Words, which continued to increase. However, it prompted Macleod, who up to that time had left most of the editorial duties to Strahan, to call for the galley proofs of Rachel Ray, which he had not read. Upon reading them, he concluded that the novel was unsuitable for the magazine. He emphasised to Trollope that he had found nothing morally objectionable in the story; however, he felt that the negative portrayal of all of the Evangelical characters would seriously offend his readership. Publishing Rachel Ray, he wrote, would "keep Good Words and its Editor in boiling water until either were boiled to death".

=== Publication ===
At about the time that Strahan and Macleod had purchased the serial rights to the novel, Trollope had sold publisher Chapman & Hall the book rights to an edition of 1500 copies for £500. Upon learning that there would be no serial publication, he resumed negotiations with Chapman & Hall, who agreed to pay an additional £500 to double their print edition. Trollope then offered a compromise to Strahan: although he was entitled to £1000 for the serial rights to the novel, he would accept the £500 difference between Strahan's contractual obligation and the additional £500 that he would get from Chapman & Hall. Strahan accepted this offer. In his autobiography, Trollope states that during his life, he received a total of £1645 for Rachel Ray.

The affair did not affect the personal friendship of Trollope and Macleod. The novelist continued to write for Good Words: seven more stories and two novels, The Golden Lion of Granpère and Kept in the Dark, were published in the magazine.

The rejection of the novel by Good Words ended the plan to have it illustrated by Millais. The artist had produced one watercolour for the novel; this was subsequently used as the frontispiece for Chapman & Hall's one-volume "seventh edition", issued in 1864.

Beside the Chapman & Hall editions, the novel was published in 1863 by Harper in New York, and by Tauchnitz in Leipzig. A Russian translation was published in St. Petersburg in 1864, and a French translation by Hachette of Paris in 1869; both of these translations bore the title Rachel Ray. More recently, editions of the novel have been released by Dover Publications in 1980; by Arno in 1981; by the Trollope Society in 1990; and by Oxford University Press in 2008.

== Reception ==
George Eliot was favourably impressed by Rachel Ray; to Trollope, she wrote, "[Y]ou have organized thoroughly natural everyday incidents into a strictly related well proportioned whole". Contemporary critics echoed this; an article in the Athenaeum compared the novel favourably with more sensational contemporary works, saying that the "simple story of doings in a picturesque nook of Devonshire is as delightful as it is healthy". Reviewers at the time of publication also praised Trollope's portrayals of the inner lives of women and their conversations among themselves.

Contemporary reviewers were less pleased with the descent from the clerical gentry of the Barsetshire novels to the lower middle classes. A Saturday Review notice acerbically described the heroine as "a young woman whose unhappiness is caused by her lover not setting up a brewery fast enough".
