= Miss Mackenzie =

1865 novel by Anthony Trollope

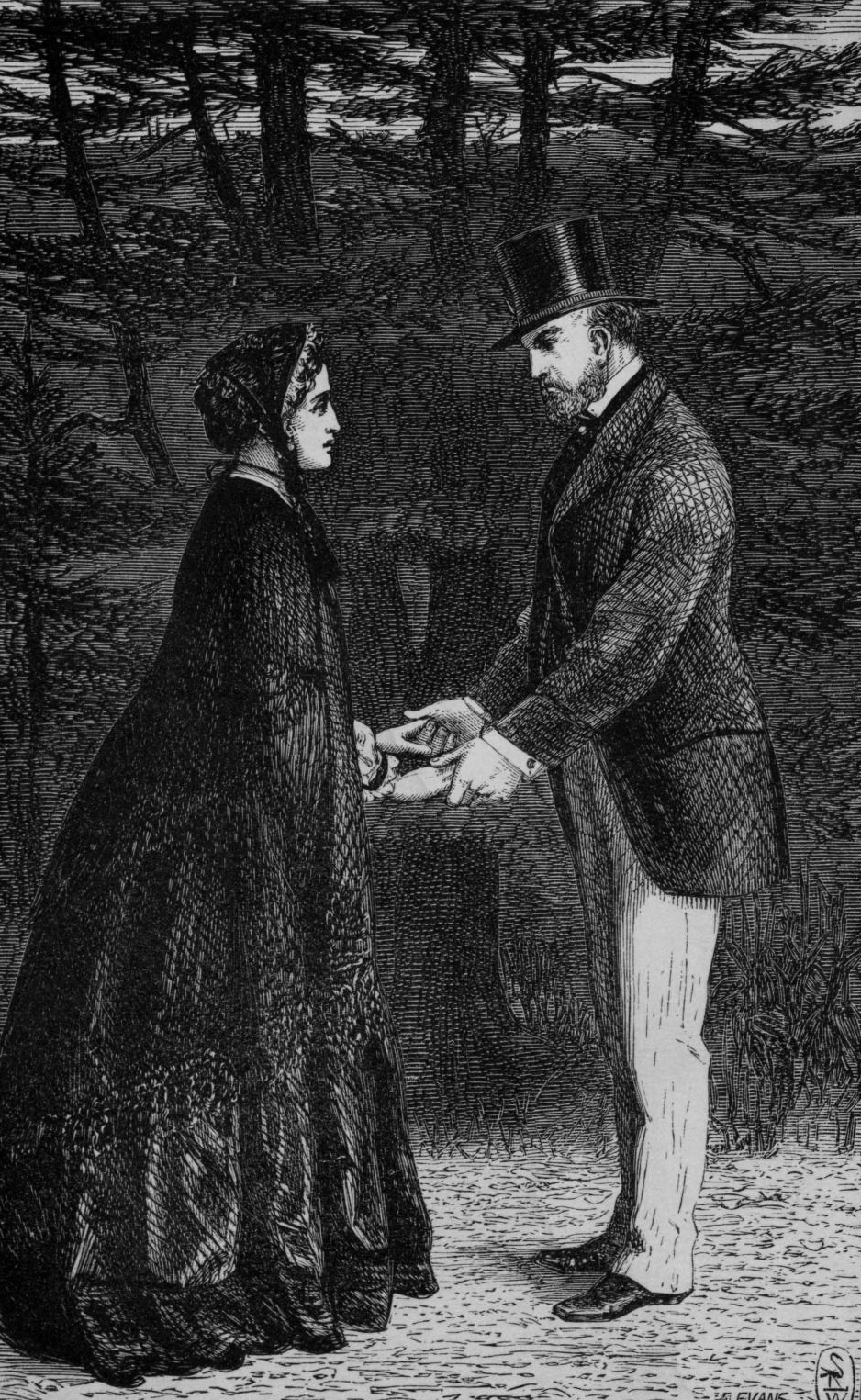
- Miss Mackenzie and Mr. John Ball
- Author: Anthony Trollope
- Language: English
- Publisher: Chapman & Hall
- Publication date: 16 February 1865
- Publication place: United Kingdom
- Media type: Book
- ISBN: 978-0-19-281846-1 (Oxford World's Classics edition, 1988)

Miss Mackenzie is an 1865 novel by Anthony Trollope. It was written in 1864 and published by Chapman & Hall on 16 February 1865. In his 1883 autobiography, Trollope stated that Miss Mackenzie "was written with the desire that a novel may be produced without any love; but even in this attempt it breaks down before the conclusion."

== Synopsis ==
After spending most of her adult life nursing first her dying father and then her invalid brother Walter, 35-year-old Margaret Mackenzie inherits a significant fortune from Walter at his death. Very unused to mingling in society, but seeking her place in it, Miss Mackenzie moves to a town called Littlebath (modeled after Cheltenham, Gloucestershire), and joins a group of Evangelicals centered around the popular local pastor Mr. Stumfold and his wife. At Littlebath, she meets three men who are interested in marrying her. One is Samuel Rubb, the business partner of her surviving brother, Tom Mackenzie; another is Mr. Maguire, Mr. Stumfold's curate, who is only interested in securing her wealth; and the third is her cousin, John Ball, a widower with a large family to support.

She is soon asked by Mr. Rubb to lend him and her brother £2500 for business purposes, the amount supposedly (but not) secured against the business. Mr. Rubb eventually admits that the loan is not as he had described and is unlikely to ever be paid back. His honesty allows him to remain a prospective husband, though his manners are not those of the upper class, as Miss Mackenzie is painfully aware. She is invited for a short stay with the Ball family, and while there refuses a marriage proposal from John Ball. Mr. Maguire asks Miss Mackenzie to marry him when she returns to Littlebath, but she is put off by a prominent, disfiguring squint. She manages to avoid giving him a definite answer when she is informed that her brother Tom is dying and wishes to see her. While in London, she refuses Mr. Maguire by letter, as her fortune will be needed to help support Tom's family.

After Tom's death, Miss Mackenzie finds out that there is a problem with her brother Walter's will, and that John Ball is the rightful inheritor. She puts up no resistance to restoring the estate to him. He asks her to marry him again while the legal issues are being dealt with by their respective lawyers, and she accepts him. Mr. Maguire, unwilling to believe Miss Mackenzie has lost all her wealth, starts writing articles in an Evangelical newspaper about a Lion and the Lamb he intends to devour. The story of "the Lion and the Lamb" is picked up by newspapers across the country, causing John Ball much agony, even though public opinion is on his side. The courts eventually decide in favour of John Ball, who soon becomes Sir John Ball after his father's death. Over the objections of his mother, Sir John and Miss Mackenzie are married. Mr. Maguire marries a lodger in Tom Mackenzie's old house, Miss Corza, while Mr. Rubb becomes the acknowledged suitor of one of Tom's daughters.

== Critical response ==
In his 1883 autobiography, Trollope stated that Miss Mackenzie "was written with the desire that a novel may be produced without any love; but even in this attempt it breaks down before the conclusion." Critics of the day did not praise the novel, but found that it had humor and interest. Early 20th century critics like Michael Sadleir were dismissive of it.

Though critics like the young Henry James found Miss Mackenzie vulgar and prosaic, others have found interesting aspects to the novel, including the fidelity and sympathy with which Trollope depicts the lives of ordinary characters like Miss Mackenzie and Mr. Rubb, and his satirical treatment of Evangelical society, of its representatives in the novel, Mr. and Mrs. Stumfold, and of the group gathered around them. Near the end of the novel there is a London charity bazaar filled with fashionable society, which some critics have found amusingly ridiculous.
