= Kept in the Dark =

1882 novel by Anthony Trollope

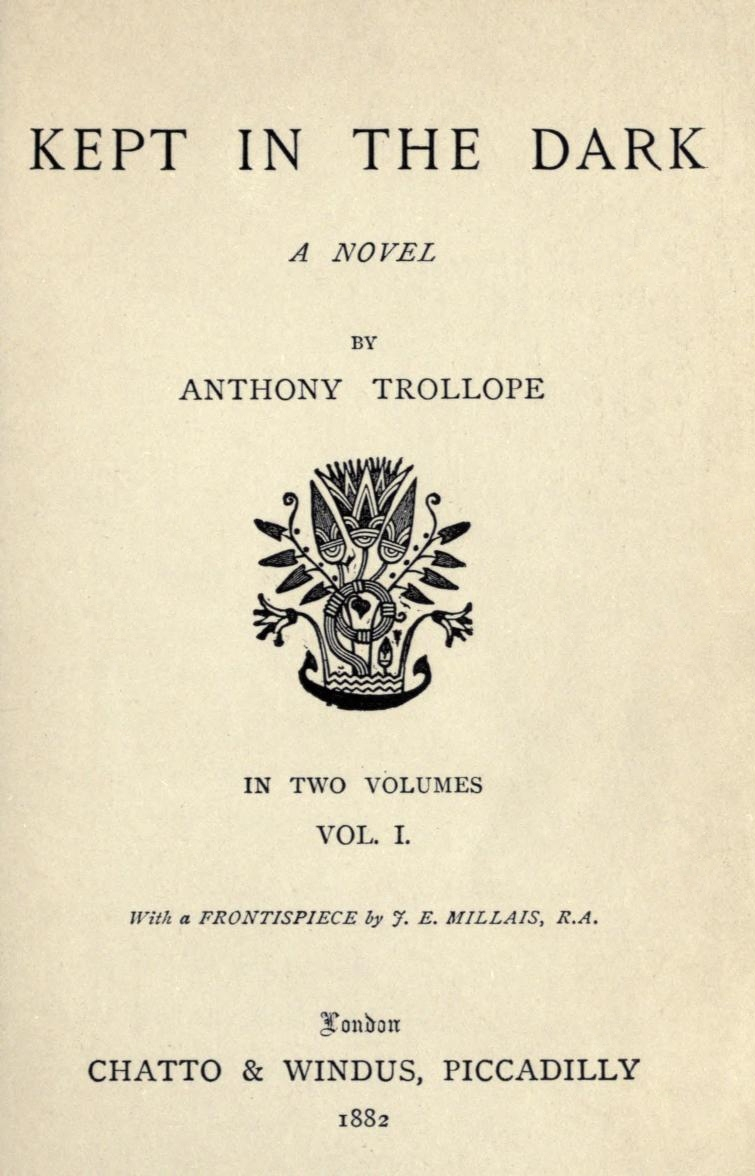
First edition title page.

Kept in the Dark is a novel by the 19th-century English novelist Anthony Trollope. One of his lesser and later works, it nonetheless has interest. It was published in eight monthly instalments in Good Words in 1882, and also in book form in the same year.

== Plot ==
Cecilia Holt ends her engagement to Sir Francis Geraldine because of his indifference to her; she goes abroad and meets Mr. George Western, who has been jilted by a beautiful girl. They marry, but she does not tell him she has been previously engaged, though he has told her his story. When Western is informed of the previous engagement by Sir Francis, he leaves his wife and goes abroad; Cecilia returns to Exeter to live with her mother. Her sister-in-law in the end effects a reconciliation. There is a comic sub-plot, often found in Trollope's work, involving one of Cecilia's friends who attempts to marry Sir Francis. The novel is principally about duty and truth in marriage, and the relationship of a couple to society.

== Reaction ==
The novel received mediocre reviews. Trollope died in the year following its publication.
