= Ayala's Angel =

1881 novel by Anthony Trollope

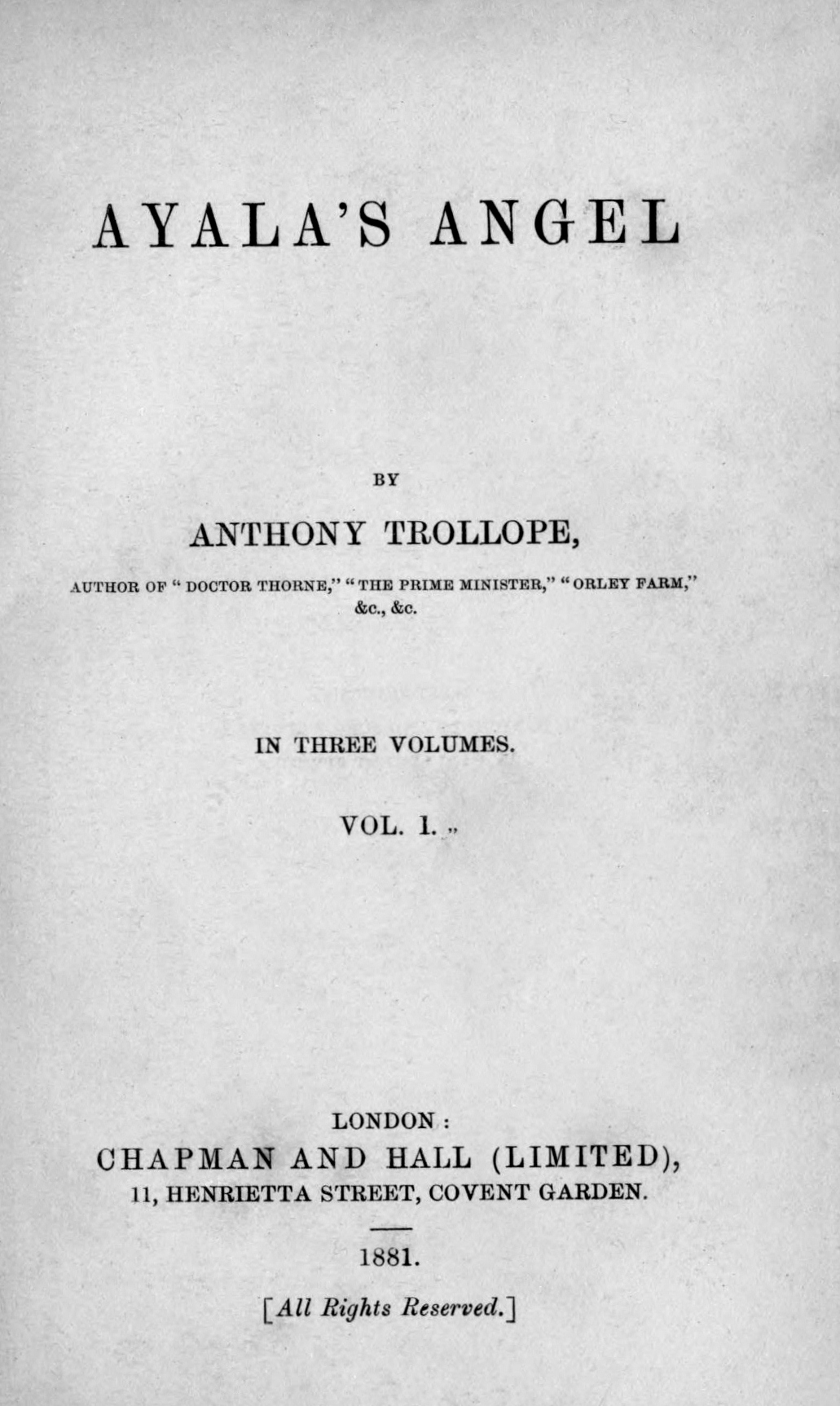
- Title page of volume I of the first collected edition
- Author: Anthony Trollope
- Language: English
- Genre: Fiction
- Publisher: Chapman and Hall
- Publication date: 1881
- Publication place: London, England, United Kingdom
- Media type: Print (hardcover)
- Pages: 280 (volume I), 272 (volume II), 277 (volume III)
- OCLC: 4944565

Ayala's Angel is an 1881 novel written by English author Anthony Trollope between 25 April and 24 September 1878, although it was not published until 1880 when it appeared in serial form, with a collected book version in 1881. It was written as a stand-alone novel rather than as part of a series, though several of the minor characters appear in other novels by Trollope.

The plot focuses on two orphaned sisters, Lucy and Ayala Dormer, Ayala especially, and their trials, with first their relatives, and then of the heart, though as in most Trollope novels, pages are given over to subplots related to the main plot.

Due to a lack of success in his immediately preceding novels, Trollope had difficulty publishing Ayala's Angel. It was first published in the United States, in the periodical Cincinnati Commercial, which, as was the usual custom for novels at the time, released it in increments, probably of four chapters per issue, between 6 November 1880 and 23 July 1881, for which illustrations were drawn, which were left out of the British publication, released in May 1882.
