= The Way We Live Now =

1875 satirical and political novel by Anthony Trollope

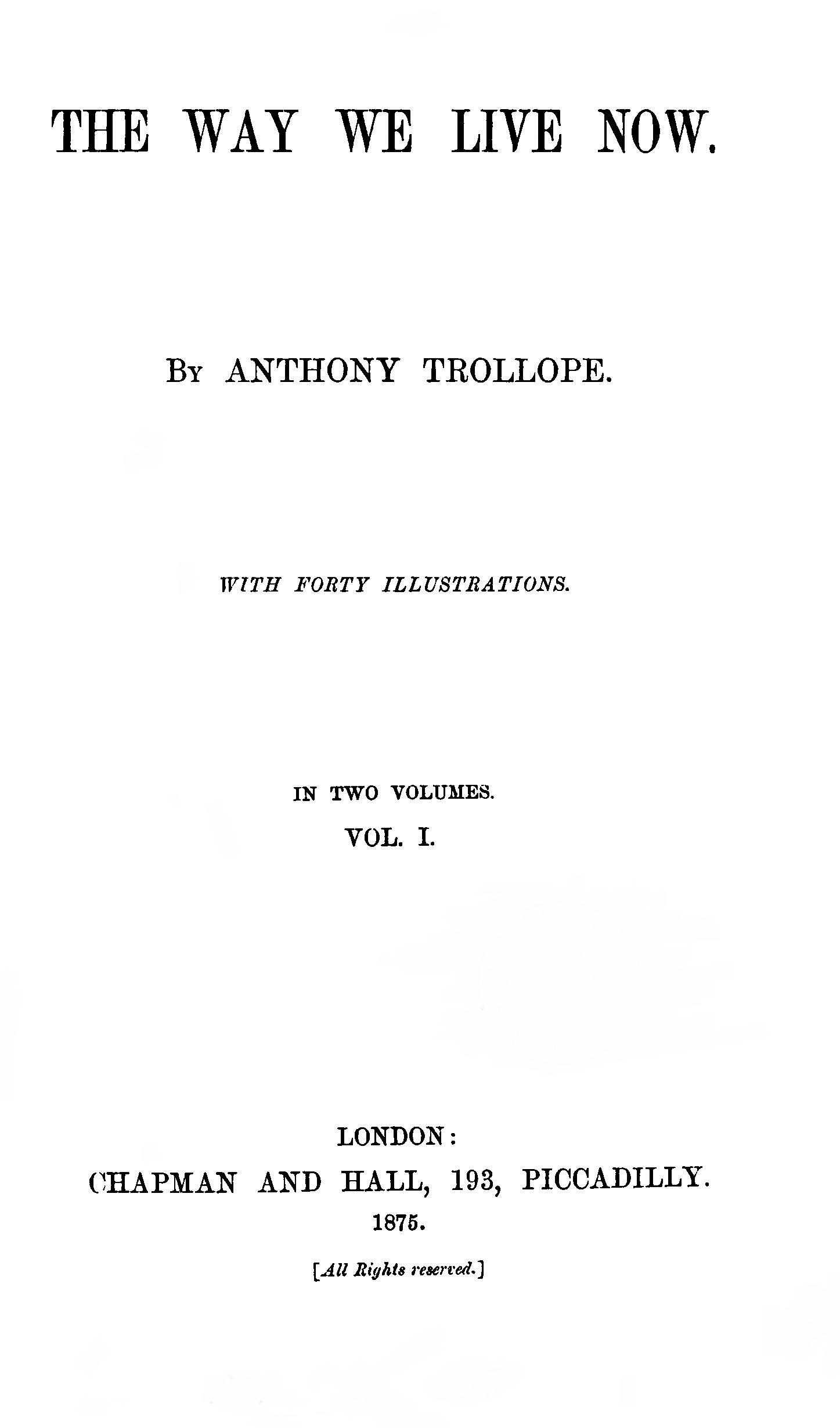
- First edition title page
- Author: Anthony Trollope
- Language: English
- Genre: Political fiction, satire, serial novel, social commentary
- Publisher: Chapman and Hall
- Publication date: June 1875
- Publication place: London, England, United Kingdom
- Pages: 320 (volume I); 319 (volume II)
- OCLC: 2653695
- Dewey Decimal: 823.87 TRO
- Preceded by: Lady Anna
- Followed by: The American Senator

The Way We Live Now is a satirical and political novel by Anthony Trollope, published in London in 1875 after first appearing in serialised form. It is one of the last significant Victorian novels to have been published in monthly parts.

The novel is one of Trollope's longest, comprising 100 chapters, and is particularly rich in sub-plot. It was inspired by the financial scandals of the early 1870s; Trollope had just returned to England from abroad, and was appalled by the greed and dishonesty those scandals exposed. This novel was his rebuke. It dramatised how such greed and dishonesty pervaded the commercial, political, moral, and intellectual life of that era.

== Writing and publication ==
Trollope began writing The Way We Live Now on 1 May 1873, five months after returning from an extended trip to Australia and New Zealand. He paused work in order to write the shorter novel Harry Heathcote of Gangoil, a Christmas novel he had already promised his publisher, but he resumed work on The Way We Live Now by July. It was completed on 22 December 1873, and the first of twenty monthly installments was published by Chapman & Hall beginning in February 1874. Chapman & Hall had purchased the rights for both the serialisation and the full novel for £3,000. However, the serialisation sold badly, prompting the publisher to release the full novel in a two volume form in June 1875, four months before the serialisation was set to finish. The two volume first editions were large octavos occupied by the unsold pages from the serialised printings.

As outlined in Trollope's notes, the original concept for The Way We Live Now centred on Lady Carbury as the main character (Trollope referred to it as the "Carbury novel"). It was therefore meant to be more of a satire of the literary world in which Lady Carbury circulates, with subplots involving Lady Carbury's children (the outline for the Hetta Carbury–Paul Montague–Roger Carbury love triangle is present from the early notes). Trollope envisioned Melmotte, originally intended to be a minor character, first as an American, then later as a Frenchman. Several real-life figures have been proposed as the inspiration for Augustus Melmotte: the French financier Charles Lefevre, as well as the Irish swindler John Sadleir, who like Melmotte committed suicide with prussic acid when his schemes unravelled. Another suggested inspiration for Melmotte is George Hudson, a railway speculator in the 1840s whose prodigious wealth allowed him to live in an ostentatious home in Knightsbridge, where he entertained the highest members of the English aristocracy. He was consequently discredited for his business activities, and died abroad in 1871, just a couple of years before Trollope began work on The Way We Live Now.

== Plot summary ==
Augustus Melmotte is a financier with a mysterious past. He (or rather his wife) is rumoured to have Jewish origins, and to be connected to some failed businesses in Vienna. When he moves his business and his family to London, the city's upper crust begins buzzing with rumours about him—and a host of people ultimately find their lives changed because of him.

Melmotte sets up his office in the City of London and purchases a fine house in Grosvenor Square. He sets out to woo rich and powerful investors by hosting a lavish party. He finds an appropriate investment vehicle when he is approached by an American entrepreneur, Hamilton K. Fisker, to float a company to construct a new railway line running from Salt Lake City, USA, to Veracruz, Mexico. Melmotte's goal is to ramp up the share price without paying any of his own money into the scheme itself, thus further enriching himself, regardless of whether or not the line gets built.

Amongst the aristocrats on the company's board is Sir Felix Carbury, a dissolute young baronet who is quickly running through his widowed mother's savings. In an attempt to restore their fortunes, as they are being beset by their creditors, his mother, Matilda, Lady Carbury—who is embarking on a writing career—endeavours to have him become engaged to Marie, Melmotte's only child, and thus a considerable heiress. Sir Felix manages to win Marie's heart, but his schemes are blocked by Melmotte, who has no intention of allowing his daughter to marry such a minor penniless aristocrat. Felix's situation is also complicated by his relationship with Ruby Ruggles, a pretty farm girl living with her grandfather on the estate of Roger Carbury, his well-off second cousin. Roger Carbury is an upright and moral squire living at the small, but pretty, family estate of Carbury Hall in Suffolk.

In the South Central Pacific and Mexican Railway Board meetings, chaired and controlled by Melmotte, Fisker's partner, Paul Montague, raises difficult questions. Paul's personal life is also complicated. He has fallen in love with Lady Carbury's young daughter Hetta—much to her mother's displeasure—but has been followed to England by his American fiancée, Mrs Winifred Hurtle. Mrs Hurtle is determined to make Paul marry her. Roger has been Paul's mentor, and the two come into conflict over their attentions towards Hetta.

In the meantime, Felix Carbury is torn between his physical attraction to Ruby and his financial need to pursue Marie Melmotte (he is emotionally indifferent to both of them). Ruby, after being beaten by her grandfather for not marrying a respectable local miller, John Crumb, runs away to London and finds refuge in the boarding house owned by her aunt, Mrs Pipkin—where, as it happens, Mrs Hurtle is lodging. Felix learns from Ruby about Mrs Hurtle's relationship with Paul and, coming into conflict with Mrs Hurtle over his attentions to Ruby, reveals all his new-found knowledge to his mother and sister. Hetta is devastated and breaks off her engagement to Paul. Meanwhile, to keep Paul away from the board meetings, Melmotte attempts to send Paul off to Mexico on a nominal inspection trip of the railway line, but Paul declines to go.

Finding that they cannot get around Melmotte, Felix and Marie decide to elope to America. Marie steals a blank cheque from her father and arranges to meet Felix on the ship at Liverpool. Felix, who has been given money by Marie for his expenses, goes to his club and gambles it all away in card games after his friends resort to playing with ready money and not IOUs. Drunk and penniless, Felix returns to his mother's house, knowing the game is up. Meanwhile, after Melmotte has been alerted by his bank, Marie and her maid, who believe that Felix is already on the ship at Liverpool, are intercepted by the police before they can board the ship, and Marie is brought back to London, while Didon the maid boards the ship and sails to New York.

Melmotte, who by this time has also become Member of Parliament for Westminster and the purchaser of a grand country estate belonging to Mr Longestaffe, also knows that his financial house of cards is nearing collapse. When Longestaffe and his son demand the purchase money for the estate Melmotte had bought, Melmotte forges his daughter's name to a document that will allow him to get at her money (money that Melmotte had put in her name precisely to protect it from creditors, and which Marie refused to give back to him). He tries to get his clerk, Croll, to witness the forged signature. Croll refuses. Melmotte then also forges Croll's signature, but makes the mistake of leaving the documents with Mr Brehgert, a banker. When Brehgert takes the documents to Croll for one further signature (which Melmotte had omitted to forge), rather than to Melmotte, Croll discovers the forgery and leaves Melmotte's service. With his creditors now knocking at his door, the railway shares nearly worthless, charges of forgery looming in his future, and his political reputation in tatters after a drunken appearance in the House of Commons, Melmotte poisons himself.

The remainder of the novel ties up the loose ends. While Felix is out with Ruby one evening, John Crumb comes upon them and, believing that Felix is forcing his attentions on her, thoroughly beats Felix. Ruby finally realises that Felix will never marry her, and returns home to marry John. Felix is forced to live on a small allowance in the British community in East Prussia, to which he is taken by the Anglican priest who is being sent to minister to them. Lady Carbury marries Mr Broune, who has been a true friend to her throughout her troubles. Hetta and Paul are finally reconciled after he tells her the truth about Mrs Hurtle. Roger forgives Paul and allows the couple to live at Carbury Manor, which he vows to leave to their child. Marie, now financially independent, becomes acquainted with Hamilton K. Fisker, and agrees to go with him to San Francisco, where she eventually marries him. She is accompanied by her stepmother, Madame Melmotte; Croll, who marries Madame Melmotte; and Mrs Hurtle.

== Adaptations ==
The novel was adapted for television in a five-part adaptation in 1969 and a four-part adaptation in 2001 by the BBC. The 2001 adaptation aired on the American network PBS as well. It was also adapted for radio (and re-set in the present day) as a 2008 Woman's Hour drama serial in fifteen parts of twelve minutes by Jonathan Myerson, under the title The Way We Live Right Now.

== Trollope's own views of his novel ==
In his autobiography, Trollope described his motivations for writing the novel as follows:

Nevertheless a certain class of dishonesty, dishonesty magnificent in its proportions, and climbing into high places, has become at the same time so rampant and so splendid that there seems to be reason for fearing that men and women will be taught to feel that dishonesty, if it can become splendid, will cease to be abominable. If dishonesty can live in a gorgeous palace with pictures on all its walls, and gems in all its cupboards, with marble and ivory in all its corners, and can give Apician dinners, and get into Parliament, and deal in millions, then dishonesty is not disgraceful, and the man dishonest after such a fashion is not a low scoundrel. Instigated, I say, by some such reflections as these, I sat down in my new house to write The Way We Live Now.

Trollope wrote that The Way We Live Now "was, as a satire, powerful and good. The character of Melmotte is well maintained. The Beargarden is amusing,—and not untrue.... [T]he young lady with her two lovers [referring to Hetta] is weak and vapid...." Hetta, Roger, and Paul were all "uninteresting," in his view. "The interest of the story," he wrote, "lies among the wicked and foolish people,—with Melmotte and his daughter, with the American woman, Mrs Hurtle, and with John Crumb and the girl of his heart. ... Upon the whole," Trollope wrote, "I by no means look upon the book as one of my failures...."

== 150th anniversary ==
The Trollope Society planned major events to commemorate the novel in 2025 including focused discussion of The Way We Live Now led by Dr Sati McKenzie, a 150th Anniversary Dinner at the Reform Club featuring a talk by Professor Dinah Birch, and a literary tour of Kensal Green Cemetery with a visit to Trollope’s grave.
