= Marquess Wu =

Marquess Wu or variants may refer to:

== Zhou dynasty ==
- Marquis Wu of Jin (fl. 10th or 9th century BC), third ruler of the state of Jin
- Marquis Wu of Cai (died 837 BC), sixth ruler of the State of Cai
- Marquess Lie of Han (died 387 BC), also known as Marquess Wu of Han, a ruler of the State of Han
- Marquess Wu of Wei (died 370 BC), a ruler of the State of Wei

== Three Kingdoms period China ==
- Sun Ce (175–200), late Han dynasty warlord, formally Marquess of Wu
- Sun Quan (182–252), founder of Eastern Wu, Sun Ce's brother, one-time Marquis of Wu, later Emperor Da of Wu
- Zhuge Liang (181–234), Shu Han politician, Marquis of Wu District

== See also ==
- Duke Wu (disambiguation)
- King Wu (disambiguation)
- Empress Wu (disambiguation)
