= Kalapani =

Kalapani or Kala Pani, meaning "Black Water" in Indo-Aryan languages, may refer to:

== Places ==
- Kalapani River, one of the headwaters of the Kali River on the border between India and Nepal.
- Kalapani territory, a disputed territory between India and Nepal under Indian administration
- Kalapani, Bhopal, a village in Madhya Pradesh, India
- Kala Pani, Pakistan, a village in Abbottabad, Pakistan
- Cellular Jail, also known as Kālā Pānī, a colonial-era prison in the Andaman and Nicobar Islands, India

== Film ==
- Kala Pani (1958 film), an Indian film (Hindi) about the Kala Pani prison
- Kaalapani, a 1996 Indian film (Malayalam) about the Kala Pani prison
- Kaala Paani, a 2023 Indian television series.

== Other uses ==
- Kala pani (taboo), a taboo of the sea in Indian culture
- Kalapani (Indian expatriates in UK), Indian expatriates who went to UK during the 17th, 18th and 19th centuries

== See also ==
- Blackwater (disambiguation)
