= Blackwater =

Blackwater or Black Water may refer to:

== Health and ecology ==
- Blackwater (coal), liquid waste from coal preparation
- Black water (drink), a health drink
- Blackwater (waste), wastewater containing feces, urine, and flushwater from flush toilets
- Blackwater fever, an acute kidney disease
- Blackwater river, a classification of river with dark-colored waters

== Places ==
- Blackwater, Queensland, a coal mining area in Australia
- Blackwater, Ontario, a community in the Township of Brock, Ontario, Canada
- Blackwater, County Wexford, a rural village in Ireland

=== United Kingdom ===
- Blackwater, Cornwall, a village
- Blackwater, Dorset, a small hamlet
- Blackwater, Hampshire, a small town
  - Blackwater railway station
- Blackwater, Isle of Wight, a village
  - Blackwater railway station (Isle of Wight), a former station
- Blackwater Reservoir, a reservoir in the Scottish Highlands

=== United States ===
- Blackwater, Arizona, a census-designated place in Pinal County
- Blackwater National Wildlife Refuge, a waterfowl sanctuary in Maryland
- Blackwater, Missouri, a city
- Blackwater, New Mexico, a power exchange between Texas and New Mexico
- Blackwater Dam, a flood control dam in New Hampshire
- Blackwater Draw, an archaeological site in New Mexico and a dry watercourse that extends across the Llano Estacado, Texas
- Blackwater Canyon, a gorge in West Virginia

== Rivers ==
- Black Water (Conon), a river in the highlands of Scotland
- Blackwater River (Kerry), a river in County Kerry
- River Blackwater, County Cavan, a river in the north-west of County Cavan, Ireland
- Munster Blackwater, a river in the counties of Kerry, Cork, and Waterford, Ireland, also known as Blackwater
- Kells Blackwater, a river in the counties of Cavan and Meath, Ireland, also known as the Leinster Blackwater
- River Blackwater (Northern Ireland), a river which runs through County Armagh and County Tyrone, Northern Ireland, as well as County Monaghan, Ireland
- River Blackwater, Essex, England.
- River Blackwater (River Loddon), in Hampshire, Surrey and Berkshire
- River Blackwater (River Test), in Wiltshire and Hampshire

== Film and television ==
- Black Water (2007 film), an Australian horror/thriller film
- Black Water (2018 film), an action thriller starring Jean-Claude Van Damme and Dolph Lundgren
- "Blackwater" (Game of Thrones), an episode of Game of Thrones
- "Black Water", an episode of NCIS
- Blackwater (TV series), Scandinavian television drama (2023)

== Books ==
- Blackwater, a 1983 serial horror novel by Michael McDowell
- Black Water (novella), a 1992 novella by Joyce Carol Oates
- Blackwater (novel) or Händelser vid vatten, a 1993 novel by Kerstin Ekman
- Blackwater: The Rise of the World's Most Powerful Mercenary Army, a 2007 book by Jeremy Scahill
- Black Water, a 2004 novel by D.J. MacHale in the Pendragon: Journal of an Adventure through Time and Space series
- Black Water (memoir), a 2020 memoir by David A. Robertson

== Arts ==
- Stratovarius or Black Water, a Finnish power metal band
- Black Water, a monodrama for soprano and piano by Jeremy Beck, based on the novella by Joyce Carol Oates

=== Albums ===
- Blackwater (Altan album), a 1996 Celtic music album
  - Blackwater (Altan sampler), a sampler taken from the album
- Black Water (Kris Drever album) (2006)
- Blackwater (MOFRO album) (2001)
- Black Water (Tinashe album) (2013)
- Black Water (Blu Mar Ten album), a 2007 album by Blu Mar Ten
- Black Water (Rudresh Mahanthappa album), a 2002 album by Rudresh Mahanthappa
- Black Water, a 1989 album by Joe Zawinul

=== Songs ===
- "Black Water" (song), a song by the Doobie Brothers
- "Black Water", a song by Of Monsters and Men from Beneath the Skin
- "Blackwater", a song by Rain Tree Crow from Rain Tree Crow
- "Black Water", a song by Timber Timbre from Creep on Creepin' On

=== Video gaming ===
- Blackwater (video game), a first-person shooter video game based on the company Blackwater Worldwide
- Blackwater, West Elizabeth, a fictional city in the Red Dead series
- Blackwater Industries, a fictional intergalactic company in Space Colony

=== Fiction ===
- Blackwater Bay, a fictional body of water alongside King's Landing in A Song of Ice and Fire

== Companies ==
- Blackwater (company), a private American military company officially named Constellis since the merger with Triple Canopy in 2014

== Sports ==
- Blackwater 100, a former Grand National Cross Country off-road racing event
- Blackwater Bossing, a Filipino basketball team

== See also ==
- Backwater (disambiguation)
- Blackwater Park, a 2001 album by Opeth
- Blackwater River (disambiguation)
- Czarna Woda, a town in Starogard County, Poland
- Cernavodă, a town in Constanţa County, Dobrogea, Romania
- Farnborough/Aldershot Built-up Area or Blackwater Valley Conurbation
- Kalapani (disambiguation)
- Karasu (disambiguation), ("Blackwater" or "Black River" in Turkish)
- Heishui (disambiguation) ("Blackwater" or "Black River" in Chinese)
- Zwarte Water ("Black Water"), a river in The Netherlands
