= Wu Hou =

Wu Hou or Wuhou may refer to:

== People ==
- Jin Wu Hou, third ruler of the state of Jin during the Western Zhou Dynasty
- Wu Zetian (624 – 705), empress consort, regnant, and empress dowager of the Zhou dynasty

== Places ==
- Wuhou District, a district of Chengdu, Sichuan
- Wuhou Subdistrict (武侯街道), a subdistrict of Wolong District, Nanyang, Henan

== See also ==
- Empress Wu (disambiguation)
- Marquis Wu (disambiguation)
- Mian County, a county of Hanzhong, in the southwest of Shaanxi province, China
