= Wu =

Wu may refer to:

== Places ==
- Wu River (disambiguation), various rivers in China

All of the following derive from the Chinese name 吳, written 吴 in simplified characters and pronounced Wú in Standard Mandarin:

- Wu, the historic name of Suzhou in Jiangsu, China
- State of Wu or Wu Kingdom, an ancient Chinese state ruled from Suzhou during the Spring and Autumn period (mid-1st millennium BC)
- Wu County or Wu Xian, a former Chinese county around Suzhou
- Wu Kingdom (Han dynasty), one of the principalities of the Western Han dynasty (2nd–1st century BC)
- Eastern Wu, Sun Wu, or Wu Kingdom, one of the Three Kingdoms (2nd–3rd century)
- Wu Empire or dynasty, a brief state ruled by Li Zitong during the Sui–Tang interregnum (619–620)
- Wu (Ten Kingdoms), Yang Wu, or Wu Kingdom, a kingdom of the Five Dynasties and Ten Kingdoms period (10th century)
- Wuyue, Wu–Yue, or Wu Kingdom, another kingdom of the Five Dynasties and Ten Kingdoms period
- Wu (region), an informal region of China roughly corresponding to the territory of Wuyue

== Culture ==
- Wuyue culture (吳越文化), the local culture of the Wu region
- Wu Chinese (吳語), a group of Sinitic languages that includes Shanghaiese
- Wu (awareness), 悟) a concept of awareness, consciousness or enlightenment in the Chinese folk religion
- Wu (negative), 無), Zhaozhou's response to the question "Does a dog have the Buddha-nature?"
- Wu (shaman), 巫), shaman in Chinese contexts
- "Doctor Wu", a song on the 1975 album Katy Lied by the band Steely Dan
- Mr. Wu (1919 film), a 1919 British drama film based on the 1913 play
- Mr. Wu (1927 film), a 1927 American silent movie starring Lon Chaney
- Wu (TV series), a 2026 Thai action fantasy television series
- Wii U, Nintendo home video game console

== People ==
=== Real ===
- Wu (surname 吳 and others)
- Wu (surname 伍)
- Wu (surname 武)
- Chinese rulers
  - Emperor Wu (disambiguation)
  - King Wu (disambiguation)
  - Duke Wu (disambiguation)
  - Wu Zetian (624–705), also known as Empress Wu
- Wu, nickname of the singer of alternative rock band This Et Al

=== Fictional ===
- Mr. Wu, a character referred to in several songs of the 1930s and 1940s by George Formby
- Mr. Wu, a character from the HBO TV series Deadwood
- Sensei Wu, a character in Ninjago
- Sgt. Wu, a character from the TV series Grimm
- Marcy Wu, a character from the TV series Amphibia
- Madame Wu, a character in the Simpsons episode "Goo Goo Gai Pan"
- Wu Zi Mu, a character from the video game Grand Theft Auto: San Andreas

== See also ==
- Woo (disambiguation)
- WU (disambiguation)
