= The Kellys and the O'Kellys =

Novel by Anthony Trollope

- Title page for The Kellys and the O'Kellys (1860 edition)
- Author: Anthony Trollope
- Language: English
- Publisher: Colborn
- Publication date: 1848
- Publication place: United Kingdom
- Preceded by: The Macdermots of Ballycloran
- Followed by: La Vendée:An Historical Romance

The Kellys and the O'Kellys is a novel by Anthony Trollope. It was written in Ireland and published in 1848.

== Plot summary ==
The plot centres around a Mr. Francis O’Kelly and family, also known as Lord Ballindine, and his neighbours and distant relations and tenants, Mrs. Kelly and her son Martin. Another neighbour, one Barry Lynch, also features. His father had somehow obtained a large fortune, which he left to his children Barry and Anty. Barry attempts to obtain Anty's portion of the estate via various schemes; including attempted murder.

== Major themes ==
Debt and the fear of debt is a constant theme in this comedic novel.

== Reception ==
The book has become more famous for the use of Hiberno-English rather than the story itself.
