= UW =

UW, U.W., U_{w}, or uw may refer to:

== Universities ==
=== Canada ===
- University of Waterloo, Ontario
- University of Windsor, Ontario
- University of Winnipeg, Manitoba

=== United States ===
- University of Washington
  - University of Washington Bothell
  - University of Washington Tacoma
- University of Wisconsin System
  - University of Wisconsin–Madison
- University of Wyoming

=== Other countries ===
- University of Warsaw, Poland
- University of Wuppertal, Germany
- University of Würzburg, Germany

== Other uses ==
- uw (digraph)
- U_{w}, the international symbol for relative humidity
- Unconventional warfare
- Unconventional warfare (United States), a United States-specific definition of unconventional warfare used by its Department of Defense
- Unia Wolnosci (Freedom Union), a former Polish political party from 1994 to 2005
- Utility Warehouse, a multi-service provider based in London, England

== See also ==
- WU (disambiguation)
- U of W (disambiguation)
- Uwu (disambiguation)
