= The Bertrams =

1859 novel by Anthony Trollope

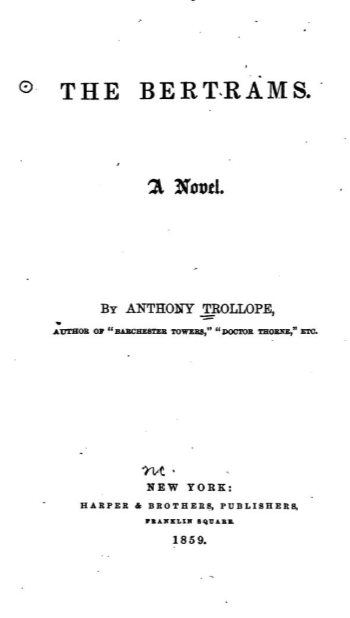
- Title page for The Bertrams (1859)
- Author: Anthony Trollope
- Language: English
- Genre: Novel
- Publisher: Chapman & Hall
- Publication date: 1859
- Publication place: United Kingdom
- Media type: Print (3 vols)
- Pages: 3 volumes (1st ed.)
- OCLC: 1383680661
- Preceded by: Doctor Thorne
- Followed by: Castle Richmond

The Bertrams is an 1859 novel by Anthony Trollope, published in three volumes by Chapman & Hall. It follows George Bertram and his friend Arthur Wilkinson from youth to early disillusion, moving between London, the spa town of Littlebath, and the Levant. Religious doubt, professional ambition, and money are central concerns.

== Composition and background ==
Trollope states in his autobiography that he finished Doctor Thorne while travelling to Egypt on postal business and began The Bertrams the next day. He wrote it at Alexandria, Malta, Gibraltar, Glasgow, at sea, and completed it in Jamaica; he sold the novel to Chapman & Hall for £400. He later judged its plot weak and the book a failure.

== Plot summary ==
George Bertram, son of the mercenary Lieutenant-Colonel Sir Lionel Bertram, is placed under the guardianship of his prosperous merchant uncle of the same name. Though gifted and educated at Winchester School and Oxford University, George remains directionless. He briefly considers entering the Church and travels to Jerusalem, where a decisive moment on the Mount of Olives convinces him to pursue a legal career. During this time he falls in love with his cousin, Caroline Waddington, but she insists she will only marry once he has established himself.

After several years Caroline instead accepts the proposal of Sir Henry Harcourt, an ambitious barrister and rising politician. Harcourt’s eventual disgrace and suicide leave her widowed, and George finally marries her. Running parallel to their story are other thwarted relationships, most notably the entanglement between George’s close friend, the clergyman Arthur Wilkinson, and Adela Gauntlet.

== Characters ==
- George Bertram – an Oxford scholar turned barrister; intelligent, unsettled, and proud.
- Sir Lionel Bertram – George’s father, a feckless soldier serving abroad.
- George Bertram senior – a wealthy London merchant, George’s guardian.
- Caroline Waddington – George’s cousin once removed and the eventual Lady Harcourt.
- Sir Henry Harcourt – ambitious Tory barrister and MP, Caroline’s husband.
- Arthur Wilkinson – George’s conscientious clerical friend.
- Adela Gauntlet – involved in a subplot of frustrated courtship with Wilkinson.

== Themes and analysis ==
The novel is strongly concerned with failure, both personal and professional, in Victorian middle-class life. Trollope himself later described the book as “more than ordinarily bad”, though John Sutherland notes its close examination of the theme of disappointment.

Other critics emphasise its sceptical tone. John Henry Newman noted the presence of doubt as unusual in Trollope’s early fiction. Hervé Picton links George Bertram’s loss of his Oxford fellowship to contemporary debates about biblical criticism and liberal theology.

== Reception ==
Reception was mixed. The Saturday Review (26 March 1859) described the novel as recommending “the expediency of love in a cottage”. Trollope himself regarded it as a failure, a judgment repeated by John Sutherland, though he also highlights its thematic interest in failure.

== Publication history ==
The first edition appeared in London in 1859 in three volumes (Chapman & Hall). A Leipzig copyright edition was issued the same year by Tauchnitz. The first American edition was published by Harper & Brothers, New York, in 1859.

== Legacy ==
Although overshadowed by the Barsetshire and Palliser novels, The Bertrams has attracted scholarly attention for its treatment of scepticism, prudential marriage, and professional compromise. Critics often discuss it alongside Castle Richmond and Orley Farm as part of Trollope’s early experiments with a darker comic mode.

== See also ==
- Anthony Trollope bibliography
