= WU =

WU, W.U. or wu (as an abbreviation) may stand for:

== Higher education ==
=== United States ===
- Washburn University, Kansas
- Washington University in St. Louis, Missouri
- Waynesburg University, Pennsylvania
- Webster University, Missouri
- Weimar University, California
- Widener University, Pennsylvania
- Whitworth University, Washington
- Wilberforce University, Ohio
- Willamette University, Oregon
- Wilmington University, Delaware
- Winthrop University, South Carolina
- Wittenberg University, Ohio

=== Other countries ===
- University of Warsaw, Poland
- Wirtschaftsuniversität Wien, Austria

== Other uses ==
- Weather Underground, a radical group active in the 1970s in the US
- Weather Underground (weather service)
- Western Union (alliance), a European alliance existing created in 1948
- Western Union, an American financial services and communications company
- Windows Update, a service which updates software on computers running Microsoft operating systems
- Women Unite, a vocal and percussion group consisting of eight South African women
- Work unit, a name given to a place of employment in the People's Republic of China
- Worms United, in the Worms series of artillery strategy computer games
- Power Jets WU, a series of experimental jet engines tested in the 1930s
- WerteUnion, or Values Union, a German political party

== See also ==
- Wu (disambiguation)
- UW (disambiguation)
- UWU (disambiguation)
