= Wang U =

Wang U may refer to:

- Yejong of Goryeo (1079–1122), king of Goryeo
- Wang U, husband of Princess Suan 1179–1199 (her death)
- U of Goryeo (1365–1389), king of Goryeo
- Prince Jeongyang (died 1397), brother of Gongyang of Goryeo

== See also ==
- Wang Wu (disambiguation)
