= Orley Farm School =

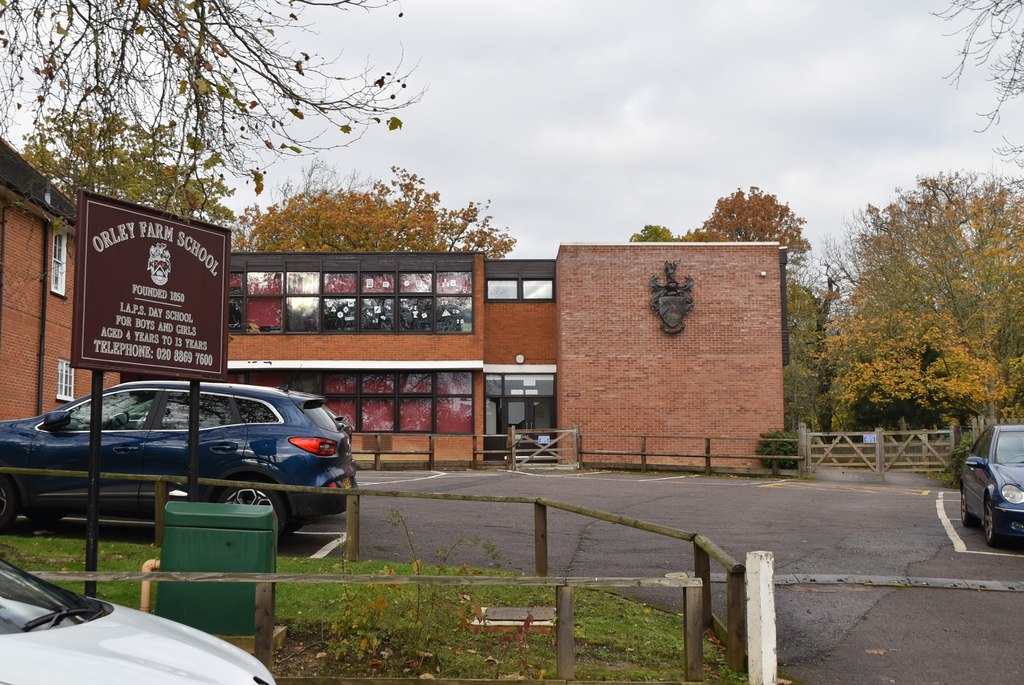
- The main entrance

Location
- South Hill Avenue; Harrow, Middlesex, HA1 3NU; England; 51°33′45″N 0°20′37″W

Information
- Type: Preparatory school
- Motto: Haec cogitate (Think on these things)
- Established: 1850; 176 years ago
- Founder: Edward R Hastings
- Local authority: Harrow
- Department for Education URN: 102248 Tables
- Chairman of the Governors: Dr. Mary Short
- Headmaster: Tim Calvey
- Gender: Coeducational
- Age: 4 to 13
- Enrolment: 505
- Houses: 4
- Website: www.orleyfarm.harrow.sch.uk

Orley Farm School is one of the largest coeducational preparatory day schools in the London borough of Harrow, at the foot of Harrow Hill on South Hill Avenue. The school grounds cover 37 acres (150,000 m^{2}). Orley Farm was founded in 1850 as the preparatory school for the nearby Harrow School, but is now a fully private school in its own right and leavers continue to a variety of other private schools.

== History ==
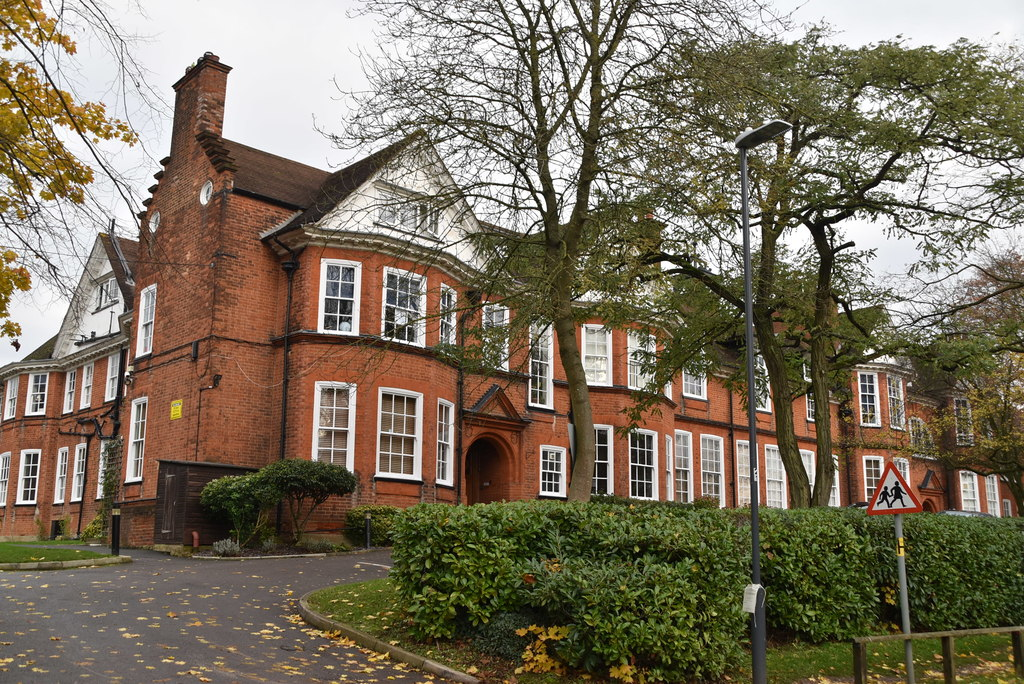
The school, as seen from South Hill Avenue

Orley Farm has evolved since September 1850 from a boarding school for boys preparing for Harrow, to a co-educational day school.

In 1984, the Official Grant of Arms was awarded. The arms and crest have three historical sources: (1) the stag holding an oak leaf is the Trollope family crest (due to the 1862 renaming of the school after Anthony Trollope's novel Orley Farm, which describes the buildings and grounds once owned by the Trollopes and later occupied by the school); (2) crossed arrows and a silver laurel wreath are included on the Harrow arms; and (3) the "Hurst" of oak trees on the shield and sprig of oak in the badge refer to the Gardner family. The motto, Haec cogitate, "think on these things", comes from St Paul's Epistle to the Philippians 4:8.

Orley Farm was originally a traditional boarding prep school similar to the likes of Ludgrove and Heatherdown Preparatory Schools. In 1984, boarding was phased out and the dormitories were converted to classrooms. In 1994, the school administration made the landmark decision of admitting girls for the first time. The Pre-Preparatory department was built and opened in 1995.

=== Edge ===
Orley Farm features the Edge Programme, which consists of five sections: Work Place Skills, Service, The World Around Us, Life Skills, and 13 Things to do before 13.

== Houses ==
Each pupil and staff is randomly assigned to one of the four houses upon entry: Broadrick (yellow), Julians (green), Hastings (red), or Hopkins (blue). The houses are named after former headmasters and activities are overseen by house teachers.

== New buildings ==
=== Butler Hall ===
In July 2015, the first of four major building projects came online after the school invested just under £10 million to upgrade the facilities. The new dining hall overlooking the pool was named after Lord Butler, a former pupil, who visited the school to open the building.

=== Elliott Block ===
In September 2015, the original music school was turned into a building called the Elliott Block. It consists of new facilities supporting Drama and Music and was named after Ian Elliott, a former Headmaster. The upstairs floor also houses the Humanities classrooms. It is connected to the Gardner Building with a bridge.

=== Davies Library ===
In September 2015, the Davies Library was reopened having moved it from the old Gardner building and tripling the size. It was opened by Justin Davies, a former Headmaster.

=== Gardner Building ===
In February 2016, the new Gardner Building opened with 12 refurbished classrooms joined to the Elliott Building via an enclosed bridge. The Mathematics, English, Science, and Computer Science departments are now all housed in this facility.

== Former pupils ==
- Robin Butler, retired senior civil servant
- Hassan Damluji, author and international development expert
- Alastair Fothergill, producer
- Keir Giles, academic
- Matthew Gould, former Ambassador to Israel, now Head of Cyber Security
- Anthony Horowitz, author and screenwriter
- Sir Arnold Lunn, inventor of slalom skiing and Catholic apologist
- Martin Stevens, former MP and Conservative politician
- Dale Winton, radio DJ and presenter
