= Backwater =

Backwater or Backwaters may refer to:

== Music ==
- Backwaters (album), a 1982 album by American guitarist Tony Rice
- Backwater (band), a jazz fusion band from Mobile, Alabama, or this band's 1976 debut album
- "Backwater", a song by Brian Eno from the album Before and After Science
- "Backwater", a 1974 song by Status Quo from Quo
- "Backwater" (song), a 1994 song recorded by the Meat Puppets
- "Backwaters", 2013 song British band Drenge

== Other uses ==
- Backwaters (management festival), the annual national management festival organized by the Indian Institute of Management, Kozhikode
- Backwater (novel), a novel by Joan Bauer
- Backwater (river), a part of a river in which there is little or no current
- Backwaters Press, an American book publishing company
- Backwater Reservoir, a reservoir in north west Angus, Scotland
- Backcountry, an isolated and under-developed region

== See also ==
- Kerala backwaters, a chain of brackish lagoons and lakes in India
- Lagoon, a shallow body of water separated from a larger body
- Backwater valve, a device used to protect potable water supplies from backflow
- Blackwater (disambiguation)
