= Wu River =

Wu is the atonal romanization of several Chinese river names, chiefly 烏江 (Wū or Wù Jiāng), meaning "Raven", "Crow", or "Black River".

It may refer to:

== Mainland China ==
- Wu River (Yangtze tributary), a tributary of the Yangtze in Guizhou and Chongqing
- Wu River (㵲水), a tributary of the Yuan River in Guizhou and Hunan
- Wu River (巫水), another tributary of the Yuan River in Hunan, downstream of the other
- Wu River (Guangdong), a tributary of the Bei River in Guangdong
- Wu River (Zhejiang), another name for the Jinhua River in Zhejiang
- Wu River (Jiangxi), another name for the upper reaches of the Le'an River in Jiangxi
- Wu River (Salween), a former name of the upper reaches of the Salween in Tibet and Yunnan

== Taiwan ==
- Wu River (Taiwan), another name for the Dadu River

== See also ==
- Wu (disambiguation)
- Heihe, a Chinese city whose name means 'Black River'
- Ruo Shui, formerly known as the Hei ('Black River')
- Heishui (disambiguation), other Chinese rivers whose name mean 'Black River'
- Black River (disambiguation)
- Crow River (disambiguation)
- Raven River
