= U of W =

U of W may refer to:

== Australia ==
- University of Wollongong, Australia

== Europe ==
- University of Warsaw, Poland
- University of Wuppertal, Germany
- University of Würzburg, Germany
- University of Westminster, United Kingdom

== North America ==
- University of Washington, United States
  - University of Washington Bothell
  - University of Washington Tacoma
- University of Waterloo, Canada
- University of Windsor, Canada
- University of Winnipeg, Canada
- University of Wisconsin System, United States
  - University of Wisconsin–Madison
- University of Wyoming, United States

== See also ==
- UW (disambiguation)
