= Crow River =

Crow River may refer to:

== Canada ==
- Crow River (Ontario), a tributary of the Petawawa River
- Crow River (British Columbia), a tributary of the Beaver River

== New Zealand ==
- Crow River (Canterbury), a tributary of the Waimakariri River
- Crow River (West Coast), a tributary of the Karamea River

== United States ==
- Crow River (Michigan), a tributary of Lake Michigan
- Crow River (Minnesota), a tributary of the Mississippi River
- Crow River, Minnesota, an unincorporated community
- Crow River Township, Stearns County, Minnesota

== See also ==
- Wu River (disambiguation), various Chinese rivers whose name means "Crow" or "Raven River"
