= Castle Richmond =

1860 novel by Anthony Trollope

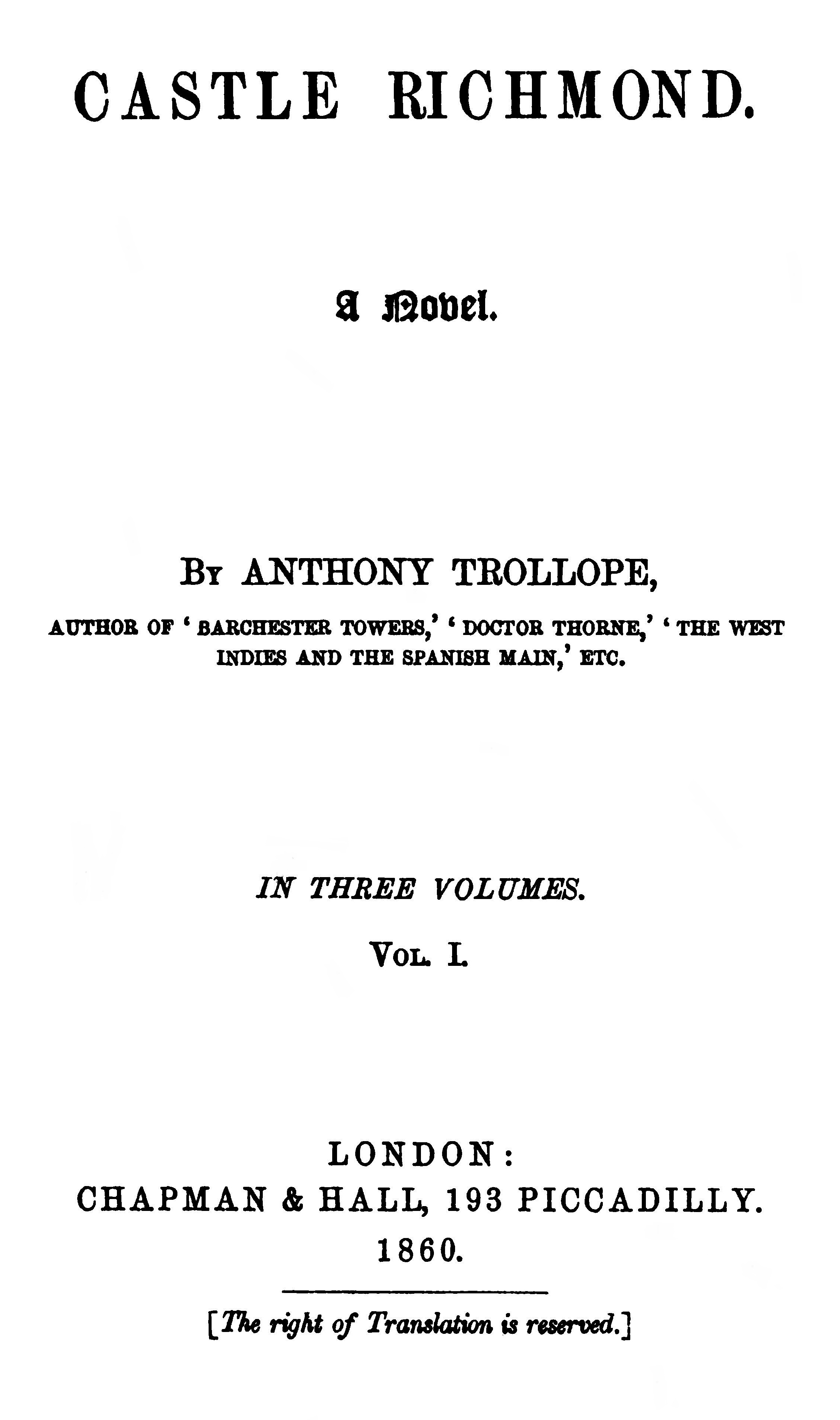
- First edition title page
- Author: Anthony Trollope
- Language: English
- Publisher: Chapman and Hall
- Publication date: 10 May 1860
- Publication place: England
- Media type: Print
- Preceded by: The Bertrams
- Followed by: Framley Parsonage

Castle Richmond is the third of five novels set in Ireland by Anthony Trollope. Castle Richmond was written between 4 August 1859 and 31 March 1860, and was published in three volumes on 10 May 1860. It was his tenth novel. Trollope signed the contract for the novel on 2 August 1859. He received £600, £200 more than the payment for his previous novel, The Bertrams, reflecting his growing popular success.

Castle Richmond is set in southwestern Ireland at the beginning of the Irish famine. Castle Richmond is situated on the banks of the Blackwater River in County Cork. Trollope's work in Ireland from 1841 to 1859 had given him an extensive knowledge of the island, and Richard Mullen has written that "[A]ll the principal strands of his life were formed in Ireland".

== Plot ==
The plot, unusually complicated among Trollope's novels, features the competition of two Protestant cousins of English origin, Owen Fitzgerald and Herbert Fitzgerald, for the hand of Clara Desmond, the noble but impoverished daughter of the widowed Countess of Desmond, providing the novel's principal dramatic interest. Castle Richmond was the first of several novels by Trollope in which bigamy played an important role.

The Irish famine and efforts by authorities to mitigate its effects are the subject of many scenes and the object of abundant commentary throughout. The famine also occasions more explicit religious commentary than is typical in novels by Trollope.

== Reception ==
The critical reception to the novel was limited but generally favourable. However, Castle Richmond did not sell particularly well.
