= Orley Farm (novel) =

1861–1862 novel by Anthony Trollope

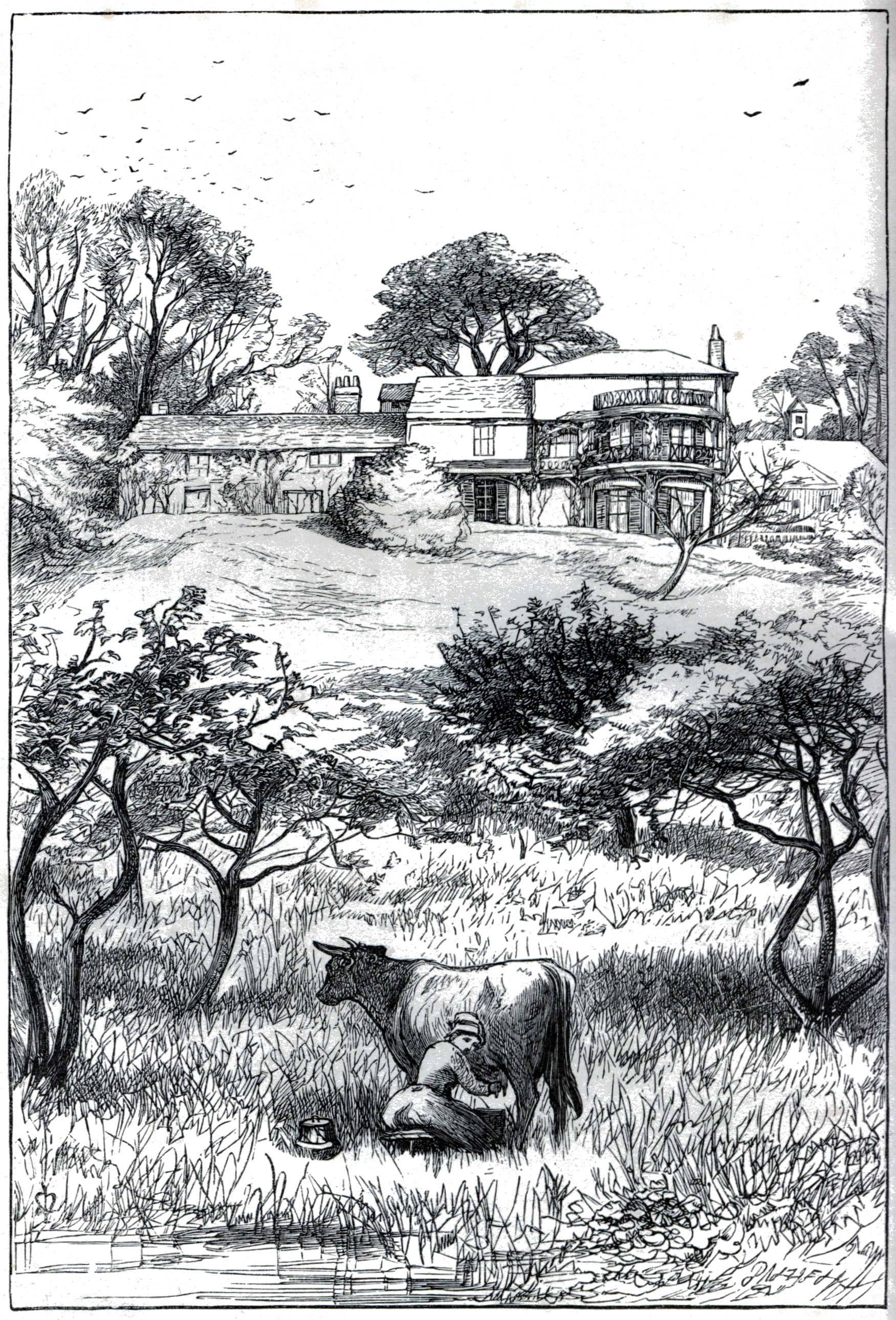
- Frontispiece to the first edition by John Everett Millais
- Author: Anthony Trollope
- Language: English
- Genre: Literary realism
- Publisher: Chapman and Hall
- Publication date: 1861-1862
- Publication place: United Kingdom
- Preceded by: Castle Richmond
- Followed by: The Struggles of Brown, Jones & Robinson

Orley Farm is a novel written in the realist mode by Anthony Trollope (1815–82), and illustrated by the Pre-Raphaelite artist John Everett Millais. It was first published in monthly shilling parts by the London publisher Chapman and Hall. Although the novel appeared to have undersold (possibly because the shilling part was being overshadowed by magazines such as The Cornhill that offered a variety of stories and poems in each issue), Orley Farm was later named by Trollope as his personal favourite among his novels. George Orwell said the book contained "one of the most brilliant descriptions of a lawsuit in English fiction."

The Orley Farm property depicted in the book was based on a farm in Harrow, London once owned by the Trollope family. The real-life farm became a school that was originally designated as a feeder school to Harrow. It was renamed Orley Farm School after the novel, with Trollope's permission.

== Background ==
Orley Farm was written between July 1860 and June 1861. The novel was first published in monthly shilling parts by the London publisher Chapman and Hall from March 1861 to October 1862, with forty wood-engraving illustrations by John Everett Millais. Each part comprised two illustrations that were situated at the front, and two to three chapters that followed. The first volume, also published by Chapman and Hall, appeared in December 1861, before the novel's serialisation was completed. The second volume was published in September 1862, and both volumes included the illustrations.

To produce some of these volumes, Chapman and Hall used the unsold parts, making the double volume set valuable for present-day collectors. While the cost for the monthly parts had been low, the double volume set was eleven shillings per volume. The standard price for such books was ten shillings, and in a letter to the publisher, Trollope blamed the increased price for slow sales of the first volume.

Trollope's arrangement with Chapman and Hall was that he would receive £125 for each of the monthly parts, a sum of £2,500, with an additional half interest in each copy sold after the first 10,000. He was paid a total of £3,135 under this agreement.

== Plot summary ==
When Sir Joseph Mason of Groby Park, Yorkshire, died, he bequeathed his large estate to his eldest son (also named Joseph) by his first marriage. However, in a last-minute codicil to the will, Sir Joseph left his Orley Farm property near London to his young second wife Mary (known as Lady Mason) and their infant son Lucius. Because Sir Joseph suffered from gout and was unable to write, the codicil was written by Lady Mason. There were three witnesses to the execution of the document, one of whom, Sir Joseph's lawyer Jonathan Usbech, died soon afterwards. The eldest son, Joseph Mason, bitterly contested the codicil and his loss of Orley Farm. He brought a lawsuit against the widowed Lady Mason, charging that she obtained the changes to the will in an improper manner. But the two surviving witnesses could not be shaken from their testimony that they had duly witnessed and signed the document on the specified date. The lawsuit was decided in Lady Mason's favor.

Twenty years pass. She is living at Orley Farm with her now-adult son Lucius. Samuel Dockwrath is a tenant of Orley Farm, a not-very-successful lawyer, and a man of questionable character. He is asked to give up his acreage because Lucius wants to try new intensive farming methods. Aggrieved, and knowing the details of the original lawsuit—because (a) his wife Miriam is the daughter of Jonathan Usbech; and (b) John Kenneby, one of the two surviving codicil witnesses, was an unsuccessful suitor of Miriam's—Dockwrath rummages through his deceased father-in-law's papers. He discovers a deed, which had no connection to the Masons or Orley Farm, signed by the same witnesses on the same date as the codicil. He finds it suspicious that they would have witnessed and signed two unrelated legal documents on the same day. If they remember signing only one, then he has a strong case against Lady Mason that she forged the codicil.

Dockwrath travels to Groby Park to persuade Joseph Mason to initiate another lawsuit against his stepmother. Mason agrees since he still harbors a venomous hatred towards her, who he insists has cheated him out of Orley Farm for twenty years. Dockwrath also locates and interviews the two codicil witnesses—they recall signing only one document. Joseph Mason consults his law firm, and they decide to pursue a legal strategy, which they deem more likely to succeed, of prosecuting Lady Mason for perjury (not forgery), i.e., that she perjured herself during the first trial when she testified to the circumstances of the codicil.

A sizable portion of the novel consists of the build-up to the second trial. When Lady Mason hears that a new lawsuit is pending, she becomes distraught and leans for support on her neighbors Sir Peregrine Orme, a widower in his seventies, his widowed daughter-in-law Mrs. Orme and her son. They all believe, along with Lucius, that Lady Mason is innocent and is being unjustly harassed and persecuted by her resentful stepson.

There are numerous subplots. Mr. Furnival, an experienced and well-regarded barrister, heads up Lady Mason's legal team. Because she is characterized as a very attractive forty-year-old, her consultations with Furnival arouse the jealousy of his wife and cause a marital separation. One of the other subplots chronicles a slowly unfolding romance between Felix Graham (a relatively poor lawyer without family) and Madeline Staveley, daughter of Judge Staveley of Noningsby. Graham has a long-standing engagement to the penniless Mary Snow, whom he supports and educates while she is being "moulded" to be his wife. Furnival's daughter Sophia has a flirtation with Madeline's brother Augustus Staveley, and a brief engagement to Lucius Mason. Eventually, Furnival and his wife are reconciled, and Sophia's engagement to Lucius is dropped. Sophia is portrayed as a shrewd young woman who writes comically adroit letters as she is always looking out for her own best interest.

Meanwhile, Sir Peregrine falls in love with Lady Mason and proposes to her. Feeling indebted to him and to Mrs. Orme for their kindness, she accepts. In the ensuing days, friends and relatives urge them to call it off, that it will be unseemly prior to the trial, and it will make Sir Peregrine appear like a foolish old man. Lady Mason is finally persuaded by Lucius that the marriage is a bad idea. She meets with Sir Peregrine to ask that they break off the engagement. He refuses, seeing no reason why it shouldn't go forward. In a shocking admission in the middle of the novel, she confesses to him that she forged the codicil, and she will probably lose the upcoming lawsuit. She says that by marrying a criminal, he will besmirch his good name. He is stunned by her confession, agrees to terminate the engagement, and is temporarily estranged from her. But Mrs. Orme, who also learns the truth, is first to forgive Lady Mason, empathizing that it was a desperate measure undertaken to provide financial security for her son. Sir Peregrine gradually comes around as well. But they convince Lady Mason that if she is acquitted, she should return the Orley Farm property to Joseph Mason as an appropriate act of justice.

The long-awaited trial arrives near the end of the novel. On the last day of the proceedings, Lady Mason tells her son Lucius that she forged the codicil, which fills him with shame. Due to the skill of her attorneys in raising a reasonable doubt when cross-examining the two codicil witnesses, she is found not guilty of perjury. The very next day, she and Lucius notify Joseph Mason that they are turning over Orley Farm to him, which is an implicit admission of her guilt. To escape ignominy, she and Lucius leave England and settle in Germany.

== Major themes ==
Against a panorama of human types and their relationships, the major themes of Orley Farm are guilt (the different manifestations of its acknowledgment by Lady Mason and by her son), revenge (its nature and reasons as indulged in by Joseph Mason and Samuel Dockwrath), suffering (by the guilty party herself and by others who love her), and love/hate (their respective presence or absence in individual characters among the Ormes, the Staveleys, the Furnivals, Felix Graham, and Mary Snow).

Another major theme is the question of individual judgment versus group judgment. Augustus Staveley purports to advise Felix Graham that a person must allow oneself "to be governed by the united wisdom of others" rather than to take it upon oneself to "judge as to every step by his own lights." Trollope calls this advice into question. Similarly, a comic minor character, Mr. Moulder, defends Lady Mason's acquittal thus: "If a jury of her countrymen doesn't make a woman innocent, what does?"

A darker theme, also seen in Trollope's other books such as Castle Richmond and Framley Parsonage, is that the changing Victorian world often brought anguish and disillusionment to those who had started out with great advantages. A related theme, which recurs frequently throughout Trollope's works, is the threatened loss of one's house or property.

== Reception ==
George Eliot praised Orley Farm but found the "comic relief" scenes somewhat out-of-place, and wondered why The Spectator enthused over those passages. She wrote in a January 1862 letter to Sara Sophia Hennell: "I have read most of the numbers of Orley Farm, and admire it very much, with the exception of such parts as I have read about Moulder and Co., which by the way, I saw in glancing at a late Spectator, the sapient critic there selects for peculiar commendation."

Trollope offered his own comments about Orley Farm and his regard for it. In Volume I of his autobiography, he wrote: "The plot of Orley Farm is probably the best I have ever made; but it has the fault of declaring itself, and thus coming to an end too early in the book. When Lady Mason tells her ancient lover [Sir Peregrine Orme] that she did forge the will, the plot of Orley Farm has unravelled itself;—and this she does in the middle of the tale."

In his BBC Maestro writing class on "Writing Bestselling Fiction," author Ken Follett describes how he himself examined the book as a way to manage multiple character groups. "Read Orley Farm by Anthony Trollope, which is a complex courtroom drama with a large cast. Note how every time there’s a story development, he goes right round the circle, dramatising the way it affects the destiny of that particular character or group of characters. Mechanical but brilliant. To extend the exercise, make a diagram of how these characters all relate to one another. Some are neighbours, some relatives, some know each other through work. It will take you a while, but it’s a strong exercise in how to write a novel with multiple character groups. In fact, I did this myself when I read it."
