= Blackwater River =

A blackwater river is a river with a deep, slow-moving channel flowing through forested swamps or wetlands.

Blackwater River may also refer to:

== Canada ==
- West Road River (also Blackwater River), a major tributary of the Fraser River

== Great Britain ==
=== England ===
- Blackwater River (River Axe), a tributary of the River Axe in Devon and Dorset
- River Blackwater, Essex
  - Blackwater Estuary
- River Blackwater (River Loddon), a tributary of the Loddon forming boundaries of Hampshire with Surrey and Berkshire
- River Blackwater (River Test), a tributary of the Test in Wiltshire and Hampshire

=== Scotland ===
- Black Water (Conon), in Wester Ross, Scotland

== Ireland ==
- Blackwater River, a distributary of the River Shannon
- Enfield Blackwater, flowing from Staplestown, County Kildare, to the River Boyne in County Meath
- Kells Blackwater also known as Leinster Blackwater, flowing from Lough Ramor, County Cavan, to Navan, County Meath
- Kerry Blackwater, a river in County Kerry
- Kilkenny Blackwater, a tributary of the River Suir in County Kilkenny
- Munster Blackwater, a river which flows through Counties Kerry, Cork, and Waterford
- River Blackwater, County Cavan
- Ulster Blackwater in Counties Armagh, Tyrone and Monaghan

== New Zealand ==
- Blackwater River (Tasman), a tributary to the Mangles River
- Blackwater River (Buller River tributary)
- Blackwater River (Little Grey River tributary)

== United States ==
- Blackwater River (Perdido River tributary), a river in Baldwin County, Alabama
- Blackwater River (Florida), a river arising in southern Alabama and flowing through the Florida Panhandle to the Gulf of Mexico
- Blackwater River (Maine), a river in Aroostook County
- Blackwater River (Maryland), a largely saltwater river in Dorchester County
  - Little Blackwater River (Maryland), a tributary
- Blackwater River (Massachusetts–New Hampshire), a tidal inlet in northeastern Massachusetts and southeastern New Hampshire
- Blackwater River (Missouri), a tributary of the Lamine River
- Blackwater River (Contoocook River tributary), a river in central New Hampshire
- Blackwater River (Virginia), a river in southeastern Virginia
- Blackwater River (West Virginia), a river in the Allegheny Mountains (with a tributary named Little Blackwater River)

== See also ==
- Blackwater (disambiguation)
