= Anthony Trollope =

English novelist (1815–1882)

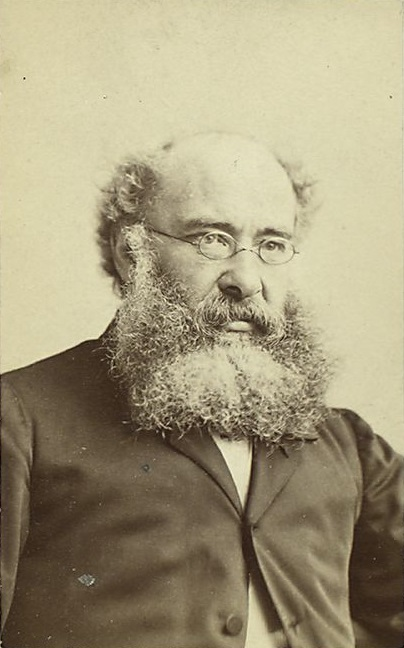
- Portrait of Trollope by Napoleon Sarony
- Born: 24 April 1815; Marylebone, London, England
- Died: 6 December 1882 (aged 67); Marylebone, London, England
- Education: Harrow School; Winchester College
- Occupations: Novelist; civil servant (Post Office)
- Notable work: Chronicles of Barsetshire (1855–1867); Palliser novels (1865–1880)
- Political party: Liberal
- Spouse: Rose Heseltine (m. 1844)
- Children: 2
- Parents: Thomas Anthony Trollope (father); Frances Milton Trollope (mother)
- Relatives: Thomas Adolphus Trollope (brother); Cecilia Tilley (sister); Frances Eleanor Trollope (sister-in-law); Joanna Trollope

Signature
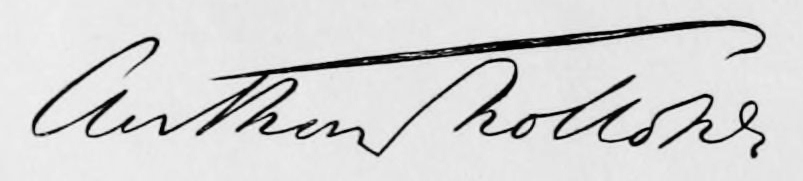

Anthony Trollope (/ˈtrɒləp/ TROL-əp; 24 April 1815 – 6 December 1882) was an English novelist and civil servant of the Victorian era.

Among the best-known of his 47 novels are two series of six novels each collectively known as the Chronicles of Barsetshire and the Palliser novels, as well as The Way We Live Now. His novels address political, social, and gender issues and other topical matters.

He also wrote his autobiography, a book on William Makepeace Thackeray, a book on Lord Palmerston, five travel books, and 42 short stories.

Trollope's literary reputation dipped during the last years of his life, but he regained something of a following by the mid-20th century. Highly successful television adaptations contributed to his popularity, and his works, especially his best-regarded novels and his autobiography, have continued to be read and studied.

== Biography ==
Anthony Trollope was the son of barrister Thomas Anthony Trollope and the novelist and travel writer Frances Milton Trollope. Though a clever and well-educated man and a Fellow of New College, Oxford, Thomas Trollope failed at the Bar due to his bad temper. Ventures into farming proved unprofitable, and his expectations of inheritance were dashed when an elderly, childless uncle (Note: Barbara, the childless wife of Anthony Trollope's great-uncle, Adolphus Meetkerke of Julians Hertfordshire, died in 1817. Adolphus (then aged 64) remarried in 1818 and had five children.) remarried and fathered children. Thomas Trollope was the son of the Rev. (Thomas) Anthony Trollope, rector of Cottered, Hertfordshire, himself the sixth son of Sir Thomas Trollope, 4th Baronet. The baronetcy later came to descendants of Anthony Trollope's second son, Frederic. As a son of landed gentry, Thomas Trollope wanted his sons raised as gentlemen who would attend Oxford or Cambridge. Anthony suffered much misery in his boyhood, owing to the disparity between the privileged background of his parents and their comparatively meagre means.

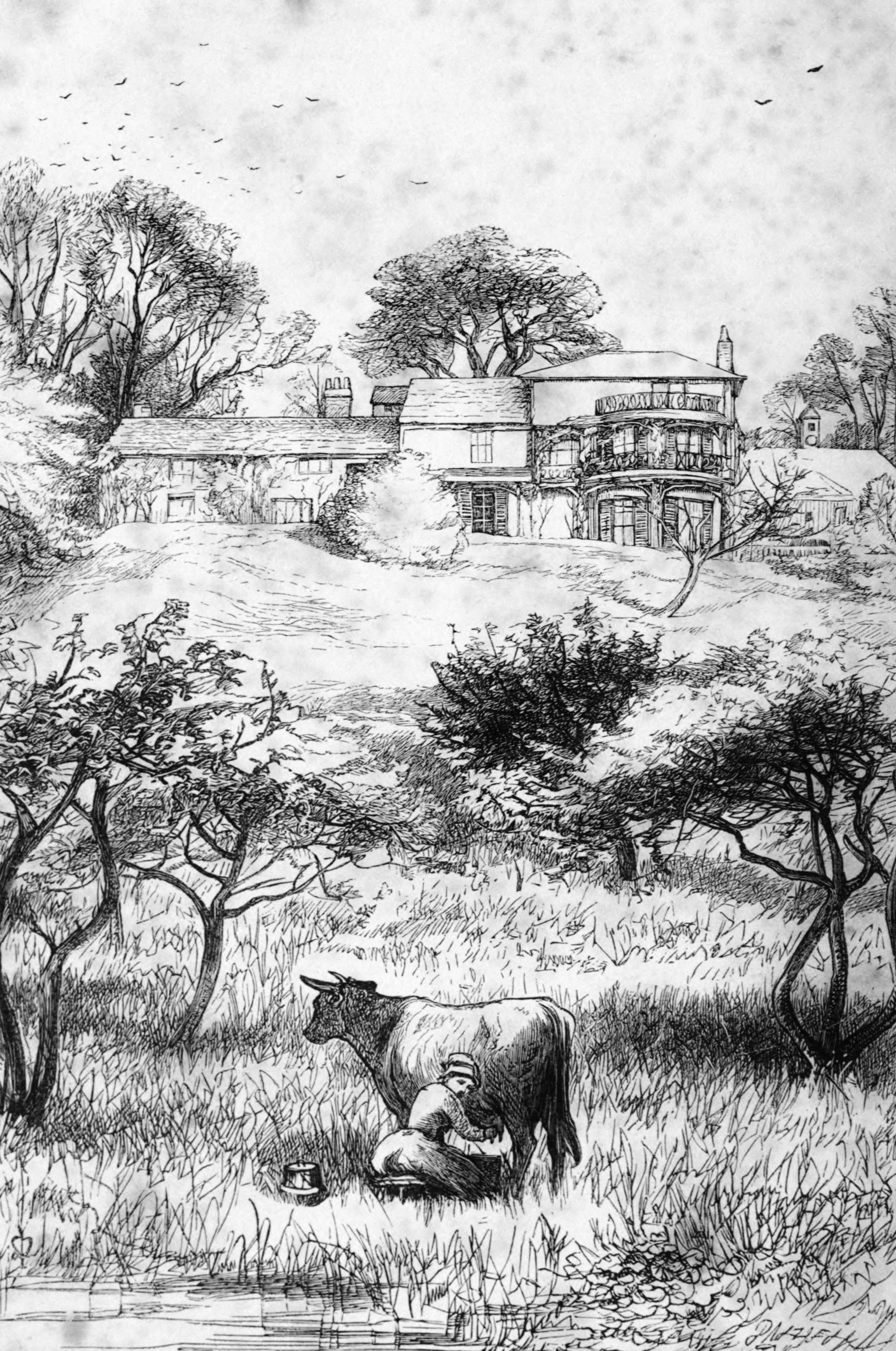
Millais, John Everett (1861), "Julians on Harrow Hill, Trollope's boyhood home", Orley Farm (drawing) (1st ed.), frontispiece

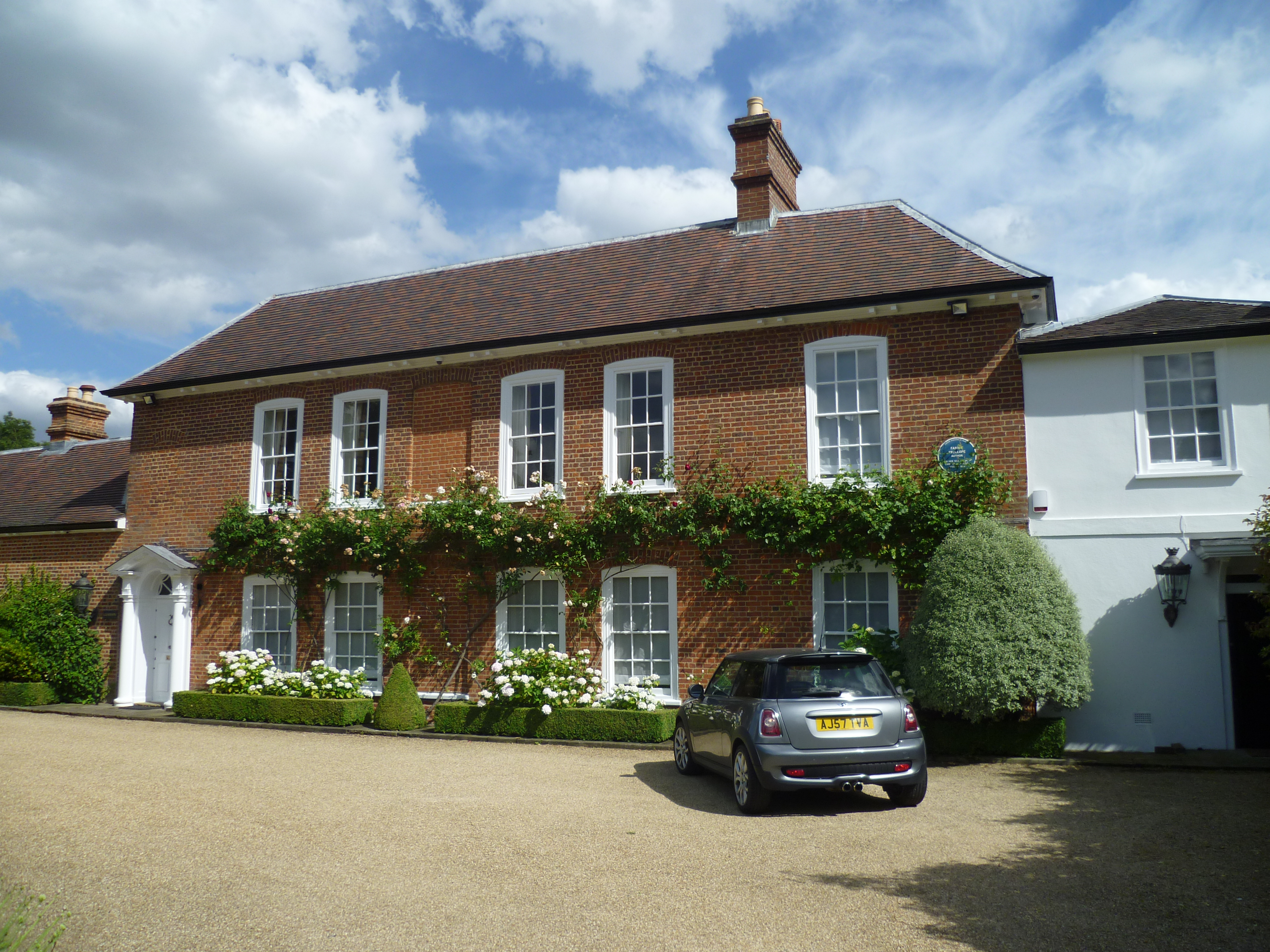
Grandon, Monken Hadley; home to Anthony and his mother 1836–38

Born in Marylebone, Anthony Trollope attended Harrow School as a day pupil for three years, beginning at age seven, without paying fees because his father's farm, (Note: The (leasehold) farm was named by the Trollopes 'Julians' after the grand estate they ultimately failed to inherit. Trollope used this Julians at Harrow as the location for the school in his novel Orley Farm. Coincidentally, Julians later became used as a school and Trollope consented to that school being named Orley Farm School.) acquired for that purpose, lay in the neighbourhood. After a spell at a private school at Sunbury, he followed his father and two older brothers to Winchester College, where he remained for three years. He then returned to Harrow as a day-boy to reduce his education costs. With no money or friends at these two high-ranked elite public schools, Trollope was bullied a great deal, enduring miserable experiences. At the age of 12, he fantasised about suicide. He also sought refuge in daydreams, constructing elaborate imaginary worlds.

In 1827, his mother, Frances Trollope, moved to America, to the Nashoba Commune in Tennessee, along with his three younger siblings. After that venture failed, she opened a bazaar in Cincinnati, Ohio, which also failed. Thomas Trollope joined them for a short time before returning to the farm at Harrow, but Anthony stayed in England throughout.

Anthony Trollope's mother returned in 1831 and rapidly made a name for herself as a writer, soon earning a good income. His father's affairs, however, went from bad to worse. He gave up his legal practice entirely and failed to make enough income from farming to pay rent to his landlord, Lord Northwick. In 1834, he fled to Belgium to avoid arrest for debt. The whole family moved to a house near Bruges, where they lived entirely on Frances's earnings.

In Belgium, Anthony Trollope was offered a commission in an Austrian cavalry regiment. To accept it, he needed to learn French and German; he had a year in which to do so. To acquire these languages without expense to himself and his family, he became an usher (assistant master) in a school in Brussels, making him the tutor of 30 boys. After six weeks there, however, he was offered a clerkship in the General Post Office, obtained through a family friend. Accepting this post, he returned to London in the autumn of 1834. Thomas Trollope died the following year.

According to Anthony Trollope, "the first seven years of my official life were neither creditable to myself nor useful to the public service." At the Post Office, he acquired a reputation for unpunctuality and insubordination. A debt of £12 to a tailor fell into the hands of a moneylender and grew to more than £200; the lender regularly visited Trollope at his workplace to demand payments. Trollope hated his job, but he saw no alternative to it and lived in constant fear of dismissal.

=== Move to Ireland ===
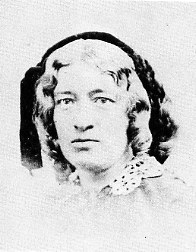
Rose Heseltine Trollope

In 1841, an opportunity to escape arose. A postal surveyor clerk in central Ireland, reported as incompetent, needed replacement. The position was not regarded as desirable, but Trollope, in debt and in trouble at work, volunteered for it; and his supervisor, William Maberly, a Whig politician eager to be rid of him, appointed him to the position.

Trollope's new work consisted largely of inspection tours in Connaught, and he based himself in Banagher in King's County. Although he had arrived with a bad reference from London, his new supervisor resolved to judge him on his merits, and within a year, by Trollope's account, he earned a reputation as a valuable public servant. His salary and travel allowance went much further in Ireland than they had in London, and he found himself enjoying a measure of prosperity. He took up fox hunting, which he would pursue enthusiastically for the next three decades. As a post-office surveyor, he interacted with local Irish people, whose company he found pleasant: "The Irish people did not murder me, nor did they even break my head. I soon found them to be good-humoured, clever—the working classes very much more intelligent than those of England—economical and hospitable."

At the watering place of Kingstown (now Dún Laoghaire), Trollope met Rose Heseltine (1821–1917), the daughter of a Rotherham bank manager. They became engaged when he had been in Ireland for just a year, but Trollope's debts and her lack of a fortune prevented them from marrying until 1844. Soon after they wed, Trollope was transferred to another postal district in the south of Ireland, and the family moved to Clonmel. Their first son, Henry Merivale, was born in 1846, and their second, Frederick James Anthony, in 1847.

=== Early works ===
Though Trollope had decided to become a novelist, he had accomplished very little writing during his first three years in Ireland. At the time of his marriage, he had written only the first of three volumes of his first novel, The Macdermots of Ballycloran. Within a year of his marriage, he finished that work.

Trollope began writing on the numerous long train trips around Ireland he had to take to carry out his postal duties. Setting firm goals about how much he would write each day, he eventually became one of the most prolific writers of all time. He wrote his earliest novels while working as a Post Office inspector, occasionally dipping into the "lost-letter" box for ideas.

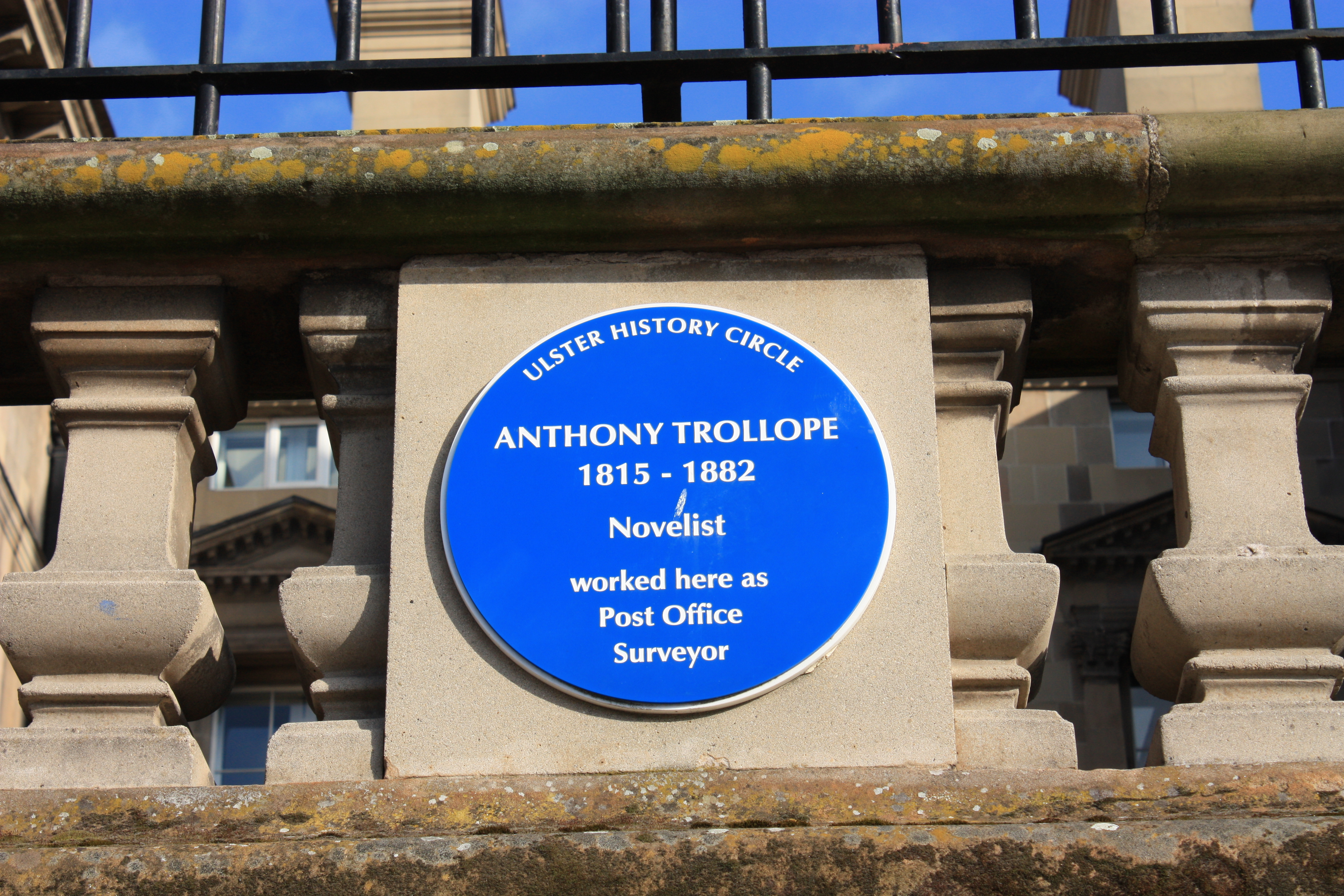
Plaque on Custom House in Belfast, where Trollope maintained his office as Postal Surveyor for the northern half of Ireland

Significantly, many of his earliest novels have Ireland as their setting—natural enough given that he wrote them or thought them up while he was living and working in Ireland, but unlikely to enjoy warm critical reception, given the contemporary English attitude towards Ireland. Critics have pointed out that Trollope's view of Ireland separates him from many of the other Victorian novelists. Other critics claimed that Ireland did not influence Trollope as much as his experience in England, and that the society in Ireland harmed him as a writer, especially since Ireland was experiencing the Great Famine during his time there. However, these critics (who have been accused of bigoted opinions against Ireland) failed or refused to acknowledge both Trollope's true attachment to the country and the country's capacity as a rich literary field.

Trollope published four novels about Ireland. Two were written during the Great Famine, while the third deals with the famine as a theme (The Macdermots of Ballycloran, The Kellys and the O'Kellys, and Castle Richmond, respectively). The Macdermots of Ballycloran was written while he was staying in the village of Drumsna, County Leitrim. The Kellys and the O'Kellys (1848) is a humorous comparison of the romantic pursuits of the landed gentry (Francis O'Kelly, Lord Ballindine) and his Catholic tenant (Martin Kelly). Two short stories deal with Ireland ("The O'Conors of Castle Conor, County Mayo" and "Father Giles of Ballymoy"). Some critics argue that these works seek to unify an Irish and British identity, instead of viewing the two as distinct. Even as an Englishman in Ireland, Trollope was still able to attain what he saw as essential to being an "Irish writer": being possessed, obsessed, and "mauled" by Ireland.

The reception of the Irish works left much to be desired. Henry Colburn wrote to Trollope, "It is evident that readers do not like novels on Irish subjects as well as on others." In particular, magazines such as The New Monthly Magazine, which included reviews that attacked the Irish for their actions during the famine, were representative of the dismissal by English readers of any work written about the Irish.

=== Success as an author ===
In 1851, Trollope was sent to England, charged with investigating and reorganising rural mail delivery in southwestern England and south Wales. The two-year mission took him over much of Great Britain, often on horseback. Trollope describes the time as being "two of the happiest years of my life".

In the course of it, he visited Salisbury Cathedral; and there, according to his autobiography, he conceived the plot of The Warden, which became the first of the six Barsetshire novels. His postal work delayed the beginning of writing for a year; the novel was published in 1855, in an edition of 1,000 copies, with Trollope receiving half of the profits: £9 8s. 8d. in 1855 (about £900 in 2025 consumer pounds), and £10 15s. 1d. in 1856 (about £1,000 in 2025 consumer pounds). Although the profits were not large, the book received notices in the press and brought Trollope to the attention of the novel-reading public.

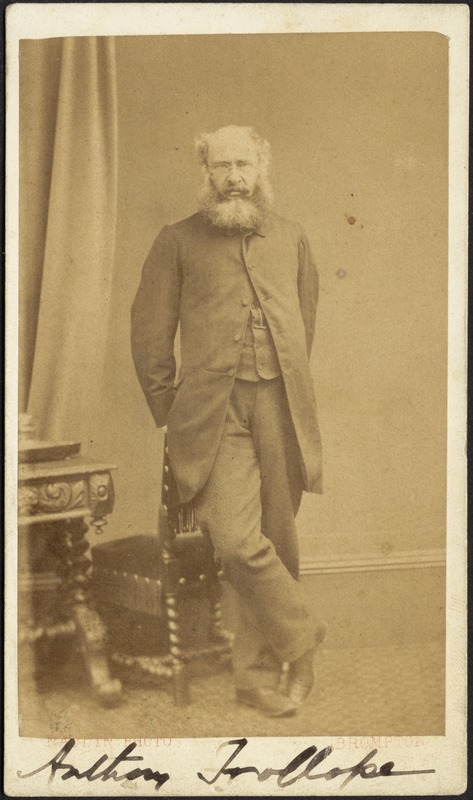
Anthony Trollope, [ca. 1859–1870]; Carte de Visite Collection, Boston Public Library

He immediately began work on Barchester Towers, the second Barsetshire novel; upon its publication in 1857, he received an advance payment of £100 (about £9,800 in 2025 consumer pounds) against his share of the profits. Like The Warden, Barchester Towers did not obtain large sales, but it helped to establish Trollope's reputation. In his autobiography, Trollope writes, "It achieved no great reputation, but it was one of the novels which novel readers were called upon to read." For the following novel, The Three Clerks, he was able to sell the copyright for a lump sum of £250 (about £24,400 in 2025 consumer pounds); he preferred this to waiting for a share of future profits.

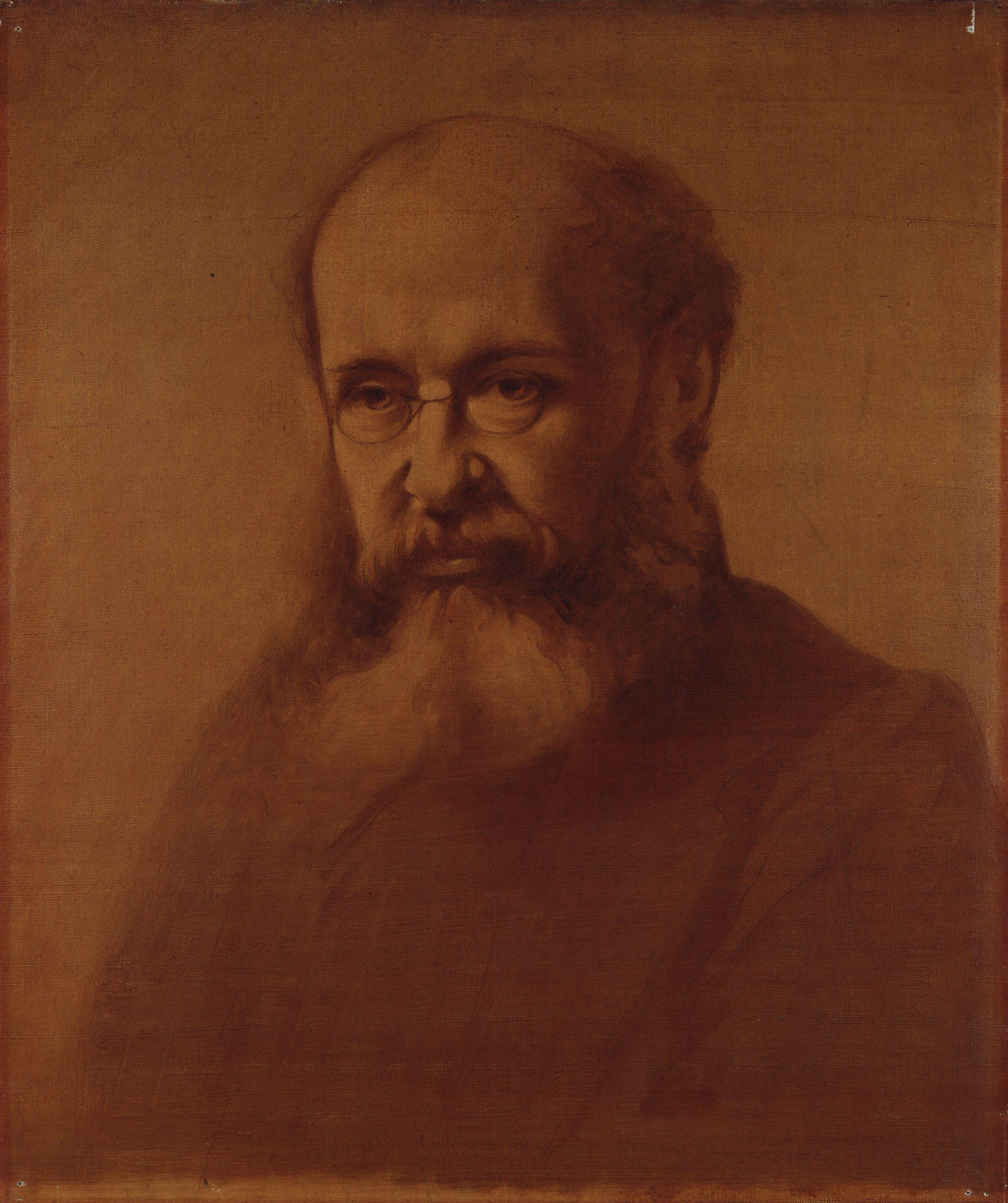
Portrait of Anthony Trollope by Samuel Laurence, circa 1864

=== Return to England ===
Although Trollope had been happy and comfortable in Ireland, he felt that as an author, he should live within easy reach of London. In 1859, he sought and obtained a position in the Post Office as Surveyor to the Eastern District, comprising Essex, Suffolk, Norfolk, Cambridgeshire, Huntingdonshire, and most of Hertfordshire. Later that year, he moved to Waltham Cross, about 12 miles (19 km) from London in Hertfordshire, where he lived until 1871.

In late 1859, Trollope learned of preparations for the release of the Cornhill Magazine, to be published by George Murray Smith and edited by William Makepeace Thackeray. He wrote to the latter, offering to provide short stories for the new magazine. Thackeray and Smith both responded: the former urging Trollope to contribute, the latter offering £1,000 (about £108,600 in 2025 consumer pounds) for a novel, provided that a substantial part of it could be available to the printer within six weeks. Trollope offered Smith Castle Richmond, which he was then writing; but Smith declined to accept an Irish story, and suggested a novel dealing with English clerical life as had Barchester Towers. Trollope then devised the plot of Framley Parsonage, setting it near Barchester so that he could make use of characters from the Barsetshire novels.

Framley Parsonage proved enormously popular, establishing Trollope's reputation with the novel-reading public and amply justifying the high price that Smith had paid for it. The early connection to Cornhill also brought Trollope into the London circle of artists, writers, and intellectuals, not least among whom were Smith and Thackeray.

By the mid-1860s, Trollope had reached a fairly senior position within the Post Office hierarchy, despite differences with Rowland Hill, who was at that time Chief Secretary to the Postmaster General. Postal history credits Trollope with introducing the pillar box (the ubiquitous mail-box) in the United Kingdom. He was earning a substantial income from his novels. He had overcome the awkwardness of his youth, made good friends in literary circles, and hunted enthusiastically. In 1865, Trollope was among the founders of the liberal Fortnightly Review.

When Hill left the Post Office in 1864, Trollope's brother-in-law, John Tilley, (Note: Trollope's sister Cecilia, Tilley's first wife, had died in 1849.) who was then Under-Secretary to the Postmaster General, was appointed to the vacant position. Trollope applied for Tilley's old post but was passed over in favour of a subordinate, Frank Ives Scudamore. In the autumn of 1867, Trollope resigned his position at the Post Office, having by that time saved enough to generate an income equal to the pension he would lose by leaving before the age of 60.

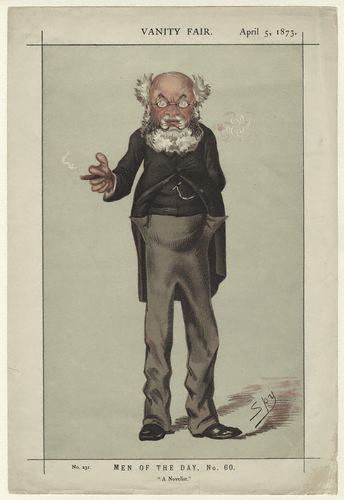
Trollope by Spy in Vanity Fair, 1873

=== Beverley campaign ===
Trollope had long dreamt of taking a seat in the House of Commons. As a civil servant, however, he was ineligible for such a position. His resignation from the Post Office removed this disability, and he almost immediately began seeking a seat for which he might stand. In 1868, he agreed to stand as a Liberal candidate in the borough of Beverley, in the East Riding of Yorkshire.

Party leaders apparently took advantage of Trollope's eagerness to stand and of his willingness to spend money on a campaign. Beverley had a long history of vote-buying and of intimidation by employers and others. Every election since 1857 had been followed by an election petition alleging corruption, and it was estimated that 300 of the 1,100 voters in 1868 would sell their votes. The task of a Liberal candidate was not to win the election but to give the Conservative candidates an opportunity to display overt corruption, which could then be used to disqualify them.

Trollope described his period of campaigning in Beverley as "the most wretched fortnight of my manhood". He spent a total of £400 on his campaign. The election was held on 17 November 1868; the novelist finished last of four candidates, with the victory going to the two Conservatives. A petition was filed, and a Royal Commission investigated the circumstances of the election; its findings of extensive and widespread corruption drew nationwide attention, and led to the disfranchisement of the borough in 1870. The fictional Percycross election in Ralph the Heir and the Tankerville election in Phineas Redux are closely based on the Beverley campaign.

=== Later years ===
After the defeat at Beverley, Trollope concentrated entirely on his literary career. While continuing to produce novels rapidly, he also edited the St Paul's Magazine, which published several of his novels in serial form.

"Between 1859 and 1875, Trollope visited the United States five times. Among American literary men he developed a wide acquaintance, which included Lowell, Holmes, Emerson, Agassiz, Hawthorne, Longfellow, Bret Harte, Artemus Ward, Joaquin Miller, Mark Twain, Henry James, William Dean Howells, James T. Fields, Charles Norton, John Lothrop Motley, and Richard Henry Dana Jr."

Trollope wrote a travel book focusing on his experiences in the US during the American Civil War titled North America (1862). Aware that his mother had published a very unsympathetic travel book about the U.S. (Domestic Manners of the Americans) and having markedly better feelings about the United States, Trollope resolved to write a work that would "add to the good feeling which should exist between two nations which ought to love each other." During his time in America, Trollope, a committed abolitionist who opposed slavery in the South, remained a steadfast supporter of the Union.

In 1871, Trollope made his first trip to Australia, arriving in Melbourne on 28 July 1871 on the SS Great Britain, with his wife and their cook. The trip was made to visit their younger son, Frederick, who was a sheep farmer near Grenfell, New South Wales. He wrote his novel Lady Anna during the voyage. In Australia, he spent a year and two days "descending mines, mixing with shearers and rouseabouts, riding his horse into the loneliness of the bush, touring lunatic asylums, and exploring coast and plain by steamer and stagecoach". He visited the penal colony of Port Arthur and its cemetery, Isle of the Dead. Despite that, the Australian press was uneasy, fearing he would misrepresent Australia in his writings. Their fear was based on rather negative writings about America by his mother, Fanny, and by Charles Dickens. On his return, Trollope published a book, Australia and New Zealand (1873). It contained both positive and negative comments. On the positive side, it found a comparative absence of class consciousness and praised aspects of Perth, Melbourne, Hobart and Sydney. However, he was negative about Adelaide's river, the towns of Bendigo and Ballarat, and the Aboriginal population. What most angered the Australian papers, though, were his comments "accusing Australians of being braggarts".

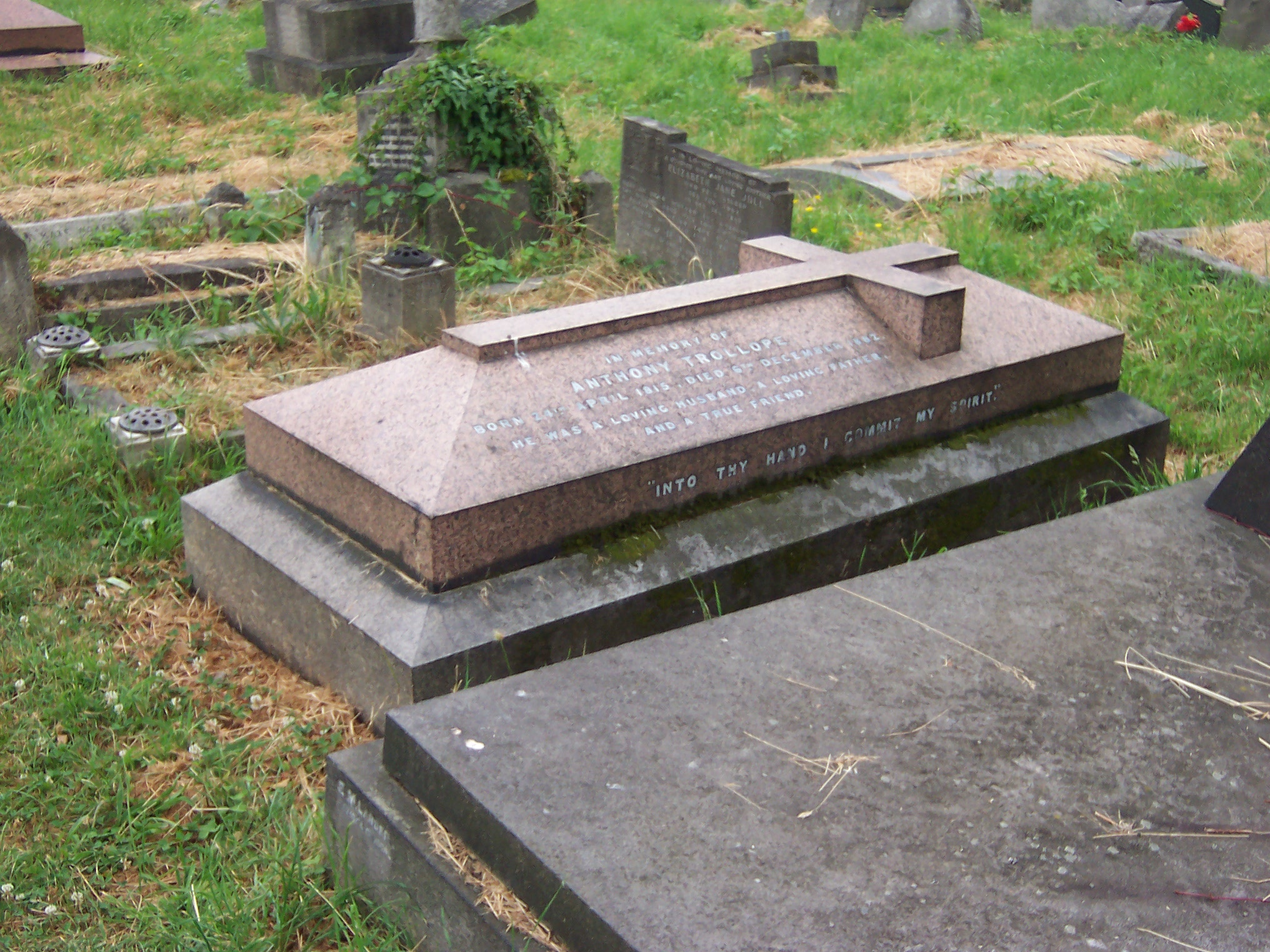
Trollope's grave in Kensal Green Cemetery, London

Trollope returned to Australia in 1875 to help his son close down his failed farming business. He found that the resentment created by his accusations of bragging remained. Even when he died in 1882, Australian papers still "smouldered", referring yet again to these accusations, and refusing to fully praise or recognize his achievements.

In the late 1870s, Trollope furthered his travel writing career by visiting southern Africa, including the Cape Colony and the Boer Republics of the Orange Free State and the Transvaal. Admitting that he initially assumed that the Afrikaners had "retrograded from civilization, and had become savage, barbarous, and unkindly", Trollope wrote at length on Boer cultural habits, claiming that the "roughness ... Spartan simplicity and the dirtiness of the Boer's way of life [merely] resulted from his preference for living in rural isolation, far from any town." In the completed work, which Trollope simply titled South Africa (1877), he described the mining town of Kimberly as being "one of the most interesting places on the face of the earth."

In 1880, Trollope moved to the village of South Harting in West Sussex. He spent some time in Ireland in the early 1880s researching his last, unfinished, novel, The Landleaguers. It is said that he was extremely distressed by the violence of the Land War.

== Hunting ==
Trollope was an avid hunter, first starting as a young man in Ireland, and admitted feeling for the sport "an affection which I cannot myself fathom or understand." Hunting scenes recur frequently in his writing, from his first to his last novel, and he also produced a series of eight short 'Hunting Sketches' for the Pall Mall Gazette. He was a staunch defender of the ethics of hunting; he also supported the presence of married and unmarried women at the hunt, over those who criticised hunting meets for being dangerous or indelicate, and in several of his books the hunting field serves as a place to advance the romantic plot. Trollope spent some of his time in Australia hunting kangaroos from horseback in the countryside around Brisbane.

Despite his enthusiasm Trollope described himself as a bad rider - "very heavy, very blind" - and in his later years he attempted several times to stop himself from hunting. He first tried to give up the sport up in 1871, when he sold his country home and travelled to Australia, but began hunting again when he returned to England in 1873, travelling into the countryside from London on the railway three times a week. In February 1875 he set out again for Australia, returning in October, and tried and failed once more to give up the sport. Once the winter hunting season had ended he wrote in his autobiography that "at last, in April 1876, I do think my resolution has been taken... I am giving away my old horses." Despite this resolution Trollope continued to ride sporadically and did not cease hunting altogether until March 1878, by which time his health was deteriorating and he had partly lost the use of his right arm.

== Death ==
Trollope's health declined in his last years: he may have suffered a minor stroke, which left his right arm partly immobile, and moved away from urban London, partly to alleviate his asthma. He suffered a major stroke on 3 November 1881 at the house of Sir John Tilley, his lifelong friend and brother-in-law. He was moved to a nursing home and died in Marylebone, London, on 6 December 1882, without ever having recovered the power of speech. He is buried in Kensal Green Cemetery, near the grave of his contemporary, Wilkie Collins.

== Works and reputation ==
Trollope's first major success came with The Warden (1855)—the first of six novels set in the fictional county of "Barsetshire" (often collectively referred to as the Chronicles of Barsetshire), dealing primarily with the clergy and landed gentry. Barchester Towers (1857) has probably become the best-known of these. Trollope's other major series, the Palliser novels, which overlap with the Barsetshire novels, concerned itself with politics, with the wealthy, industrious Plantagenet Palliser (later Duke of Omnium) and his delightfully spontaneous, even richer wife Lady Glencora featured prominently. However, as with the Barsetshire series, many other well-developed characters populated each novel and in one, The Eustace Diamonds, the Pallisers play only a small role.

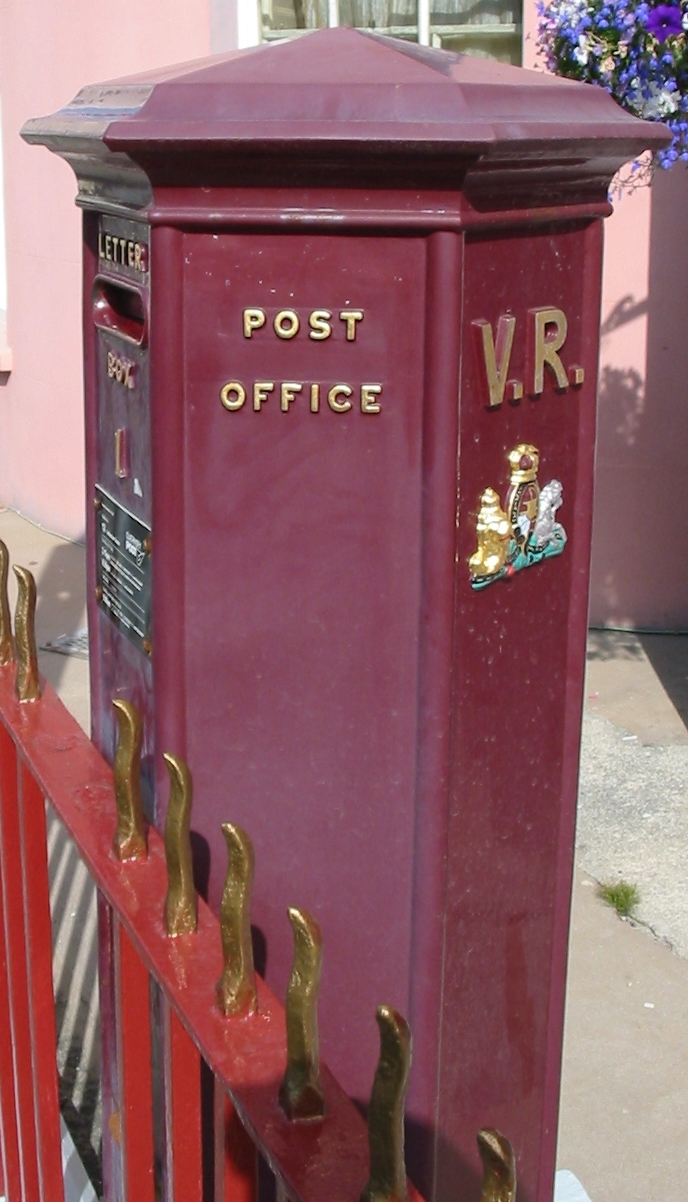
A VR pillar box originally installed in Guernsey in 1852/3 on Trollope's recommendation and one of the oldest still in use

Trollope's popularity and critical success diminished in his later years, but he continued to write prolifically, and some of his later novels have acquired a good reputation. In particular, critics, who concur that the book was not popular when published, generally acknowledge the sweeping satire The Way We Live Now (1875) as his masterpiece. In all, Trollope wrote 47 novels, 42 short stories, and five travel books, as well as nonfiction books titled Thackeray (1879) and Lord Palmerston (1882).

After his death, Trollope's An Autobiography appeared and was a bestseller in London. Trollope's downfall in the eyes of the critics stemmed largely from this volume. Even during his writing career, reviewers tended increasingly to shake their heads over his prodigious output, but when Trollope revealed that he strictly adhered to a daily writing quota, and admitted that he wrote for money, he confirmed his critics' worst fears. Writers were expected to wait for inspiration, not to follow a schedule.

Julian Hawthorne, an American writer, critic and friend of Trollope, while praising him as a man, calling him "a credit to England and to human nature, and ... [deserving] to be numbered among the darlings of mankind", also said that "he has done great harm to English fictitious literature by his novels".

Henry James expressed mixed opinions of Trollope. The young James wrote some scathing reviews of Trollope's novels (The Belton Estate, for instance, he called "a stupid book, without a single thought or idea in it ... a sort of mental pabulum"). He also made it clear that he disliked Trollope's narrative method; Trollope's cheerful interpolations into his novels about how his storylines could take any twist their author wanted did not appeal to James's sense of artistic integrity. However, James thoroughly appreciated Trollope's attention to realistic detail, as he wrote in an essay shortly after the novelist's death:

His [Trollope's] great, his inestimable merit was a complete appreciation of the usual. ... [H]e felt all daily and immediate things as well as saw them; felt them in a simple, direct, salubrious way, with their sadness, their gladness, their charm, their comicality, all their obvious and measurable meanings. ... Trollope will remain one of the most trustworthy, though not one of the most eloquent, of the writers who have helped the heart of man to know itself. ... A race is fortunate when it has a good deal of the sort of imagination—of imaginative feeling—that had fallen to the share of Anthony Trollope; and in this possession our English race is not poor.

Writers including William Thackeray, George Eliot and Wilkie Collins admired and befriended Trollope, and Eliot noted that she could not have embarked on so ambitious a project as Middlemarch without the precedent set by Trollope in his own novels of the fictional—yet thoroughly alive—county of Barsetshire. Robert and Elizabeth Barret Browning, who were also on good terms with Trollope's brother Thomas in Florence, admired Trollope personally and professionally. Elizabeth called Framley Parsonage "perfect" and described Trollope as "simple, naif, direct, frank - everything one likes in a man." Leo Tolstoy read The Bertrams while working on War and Peace and developed what a biographer called "an enthusiasm" for Trollope. Later, Tolstoy read and strongly recommended The Prime Minister during the composition of Anna Karenina, whose heroine at one point reads "an English novel" in which the hero become a baronet, a titled woman rides to hounds, and a Member of Parliament makes a speech. Other contemporaries of Trollope praised his understanding of the quotidian world of institutions, official life, and daily business; he is one of the few novelists who find the office a creative environment. W. H. Auden wrote of Trollope: "Of all novelists in any country, Trollope best understands the role of money. Compared with him, even Balzac is too romantic."

As trends in the world of the novel moved increasingly towards subjectivity and artistic experimentation, Trollope's standing with critics suffered. But Lord David Cecil noted in 1934 that "Trollope is still very much alive ... and among fastidious readers." He noted that Trollope was "conspicuously free from the most characteristic Victorian faults". In the 1940s, Trollopians made further attempts to resurrect his reputation. He enjoyed a critical renaissance in the 1960s and again in the 1990s, and there was a spike in the sale of his books in the 1970s after the success of the BBC series The Pallisers. Some critics today have a particular interest in Trollope's portrayal of women—he caused remarks even in his own day for his deep insight and sensitivity to the inner conflicts caused by the position of women in Victorian society.

In the early 1990s, interest in Trollope increased. A Trollope Society flourishes in the United Kingdom, as does its sister society in the United States. In 2011, the University of Kansas's Department of English, in collaboration with the Hall Center for the Humanities and in partnership with The Fortnightly Review, began awarding an annual Trollope Prize. The Prize was established to focus attention on Trollope's work and career.

Notable fans have included Alec Guinness, who never travelled without a Trollope novel; the former British prime ministers Harold Macmillan and Sir John Major; the first Canadian prime minister, John A. Macdonald; the economist John Kenneth Galbraith; the merchant banker Siegmund Warburg, who said that "reading Anthony Trollope surpassed a university education"; the English judge Lord Denning; the American novelists Sue Grafton, Dominick Dunne, and Timothy Hallinan; the poet Edward Fitzgerald; the artist Edward Gorey, who kept a complete set of his books; the American author Robert Caro; the playwright David Mamet; the soap opera writer Harding Lemay; the screenwriter and novelist Julian Fellowes; liberal political philosopher Anthony de Jasay; and theologian Stanley Hauerwas. The British politician Lord Shawcross, best known for his role as lead prosecutor at the Nuremberg trials, named The Way We Live Now as his book of choice when appearing on Desert Island Discs. The philosopher of "critical rationalism" Sir Karl Popper mentioned Trollope, along with Jane Austen, as one of his leisure interests.

== Bibliography ==
- Anthony Trollope bibliography
