= Heishui =

Heishui (Chinese: 黑水, lit. "Blackwater") may refer to:

- the Hei River or Heishui, the headwaters of the Ruo Shui in Gansu & Inner Mongolia
  - Khara-Khoto, abandoned city in Inner Mongolia also known as Heishui City in Chinese
- the Dan River in Shaanxi, formerly known as the Heishui
- the Jinsha River in Qinghai & Sichuan, formerly known as the Heishui
  - Heishui County, Sichuan
- the Amur River in Manchuria, formerly known as the Heishui
  - Heishui Mohe, a tribe in Heilongjiang
  - Heishui, Liaoning, a town
  - Heishui, Jilin, a town

== See also ==
- Wu River (disambiguation), other Chinese rivers whose name means 'Black River'
- Black River (disambiguation)
- Blackwater (disambiguation)
