= Wu Zetian (disambiguation) =

Wu Zetian (624–705), also romanized as Wu Ze Tian or Wu Tse-Tien, was a Chinese empress of the Tang dynasty (690–705).

Wu Zetian may also refer to:

- Wu Zetian (1995 TV series), 1995 Chinese television series
- The Empress Wu Tse-tien (1939 film), 1939 Chinese film starring Violet Koo
- Empress Wu Tse-Tien (1963 film), 1963 Hong Kong film starring Li Li-hua
- Empress Wu (TV series) or Wu Zetian, 1984 Hong Kong television series
- Wu Zi Bei Ge: Wu Zetian Zhuan, 2006 Chinese television series starring Siqin Gaowa

== See also ==
- Empress Wu (disambiguation)
- The Empress of the Dynasty, 1985 Taiwanese television series starring Angela Pan
- The Shadow of Empress Wu, also known as Riyue Lingkong, 2007 Chinese television series starring Liu Xiaoqing
- Secret History of Empress Wu, 2011 Chinese television series
- The Empress of China, 2016 Chinese television series
- Search for Wu Zetian
- Category: Works about Wu Zetian
