= Kalapani, Bhopal =

Kalapani
- village
- Location within Madhya Pradesh Location within India
- Coordinates: 23.090863°N 77.385645°E
- Country: India
- State: Madhya Pradesh
- District: Bhopal
- Tehsil: Huzur

Population (2011)
  - Total: 2,725
- Time zone: UTC+5:30 (IST)
- ISO 3166 code: MP-IN
- Census code: 482531

Kalapani is a village in the Bhopal district of Madhya Pradesh, India. It is located in the Huzur tehsil, beside Kolar road. The Kathotiya hiking area is located near Kalapani.

== Demographics ==
According to the 2011 census of India, Kalapani has 567 households. The effective literacy rate (i.e. the literacy rate of population excluding children aged 6 and below) is 46.82%.

Demographics (2011 Census)
	Total	Male	Female
Population	2725	1446	1279
Children aged below 6 years	525	277	248
Scheduled caste	307	168	139
Scheduled tribe	767	389	378
Literates	1030	642	388
Workers (all)	1201	753	448
Main workers (total)	921	597	324
Main workers: Cultivators	255	145	110
Main workers: Agricultural labourers	103	57	46
Main workers: Household industry workers	12	10	2
Main workers: Other	551	385	166
Marginal workers (total)	280	156	124
Marginal workers: Cultivators	2	0	2
Marginal workers: Agricultural labourers	209	130	79
Marginal workers: Household industry workers	2	1	1
Marginal workers: Others	67	25	42
Non-workers	1524	693	831
