= Blackwater, Dorset =

Hamlet in Dorset, England

Coordinates: 50.759°N 1.804°W

Blackwater
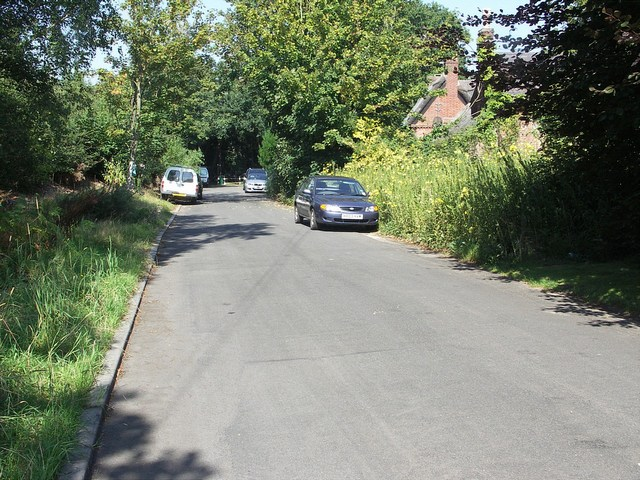

- Location within Dorset
- OS grid reference: SZ135959
- Unitary authority: Bournemouth, Christchurch and Poole
- Ceremonial county: Dorset
- Region: South West
- Country: England
- Sovereign state: United Kingdom
- Post town: CHRISTCHURCH
- Postcode district: BH23
- Police: Dorset
- Fire: Dorset and Wiltshire
- Ambulance: South Western
- UK Parliament: Christchurch

Blackwater is a small hamlet in the historic county of Hampshire and the ceremonial county of Dorset, England. Administratively, Blackwater is part of Bournemouth, Christchurch and Poole unitary authority. It is best known for the grade separated road junction between the A338 Ringwood to Bournemouth road and the B3073 road to Bournemouth Airport (and to Christchurch in the opposite direction). It was once the site of a ferry crossing on the River Stour.

== Politics ==
Blackwater is part of the Christchurch parliamentary constituency for elections to the House of Commons. It is currently represented by Conservative MP Christopher Chope.
