= Wang Wu =

Wang Wu is the romanisation of a number of different Chinese characters and may refer to:

- Wang Wu, a Chinese placeholder name
- Dadao Wang Wu, the sobriquet of martial artist Wang Zhengyi
- Wang Wu (painter), a 17th-century Chinese painter
- Mount Wangwu, an alternative name for which is Wang Wu Mountain

== See also ==
- Wu Wang (disambiguation), a traditional title of founding emperors in China
