= Kala Pani, Pakistan =

Coordinates: 34°12′30″N 73°19′20″E

- Village
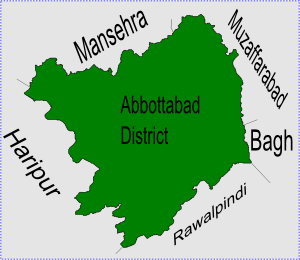
- Interactive map of Kala Pani, Pakistan
- Country: Pakistan
- Province: Khyber-Pakhtunkhwa
- District: Abbottabad

Kala Pani is a village in Abbottabad District of Khyber-Pakhtunkhwa, Pakistan. It is located 12 km from Abbottabad city on the Abbottabad-Thandiani Road at 34°12'30N 73°19'20E and at an altitude of 1762 metres (5784 feet)

It has a variety of fauna, although leopards have been a source of concern due to attacks on local people, the area is mountainous with deep ravines, which can make the roads dangerous to travel, especially in winter when heavy snow falls.
