= Empress Wu (disambiguation) =

Empress Wu of Zhou, or Wu Zetian (624–705), was an empress consort and empress dowager of the Tang dynasty, and the only regnant of her Zhou state. She was the only empress regnant of China's history.

Empress Wu may also refer to:

- Empress Wu (Zhaolie) (died 245), the wife of Liu Bei, the first emperor of Shu Han
- Empress Wu (Song dynasty) (1115–1197), Chinese Empress consort of the Song Dynasty
- Empress Dowager Xiaoyi (Ming dynasty) (1397–1462), Chinese empress dowager of the Ming dynasty
- Empress Wu (Chenghua) (died 1509), Chinese Empress consort of the Ming Dynasty, Chenghua Emperor's wife
- Empress Wu (TV series), a 1984 Hong Kong TV series about Wu Zetian

== See also ==
- Consort Wu (disambiguation)
- Wu Zetian (disambiguation)
