= Consort Wu =

Consort Wu may refer to:

- Empress Wu (Zhaolie) (died 245), wife of Liu Bei (Emperor Zhaolie of Shu Han)
- Wu Zetian (624–705), consort of Emperor Gaozong of Tang who founded her own dynasty
- Empress Zhenshun (died 737), concubine of Emperor Xuanzong of Tang
- Lady Wu (Qian Liu's wife) (858–919), wife of Qian Liu (King Wusu of Wuyue)
- Wu Hanyue (913–952), concubine of Qian Hongchu (King Wenyi of Wuyue)
- Empress Wu (Song dynasty) (1115–1197), wife of Emperor Gaozong of Song
- Consort Wu (Xuande) (1397–1462), concubine of the Xuande Emperor
- Deposed Empress Wu (died 1509), wife of the Chenghua Emperor
- Consort Ning (died 1734), concubine of the Yongzheng Emperor

== See also ==
- Lady Wu (Sun Jian's wife) (died 202), posthumous name Empress Wulie
- Wu Shun (623–665), Wu Zetian's sister
