= Kerry Blackwater =

River in County Kerry, Ireland

Coordinates: 51°51′21″N 9°44′36″W

River Blackwater
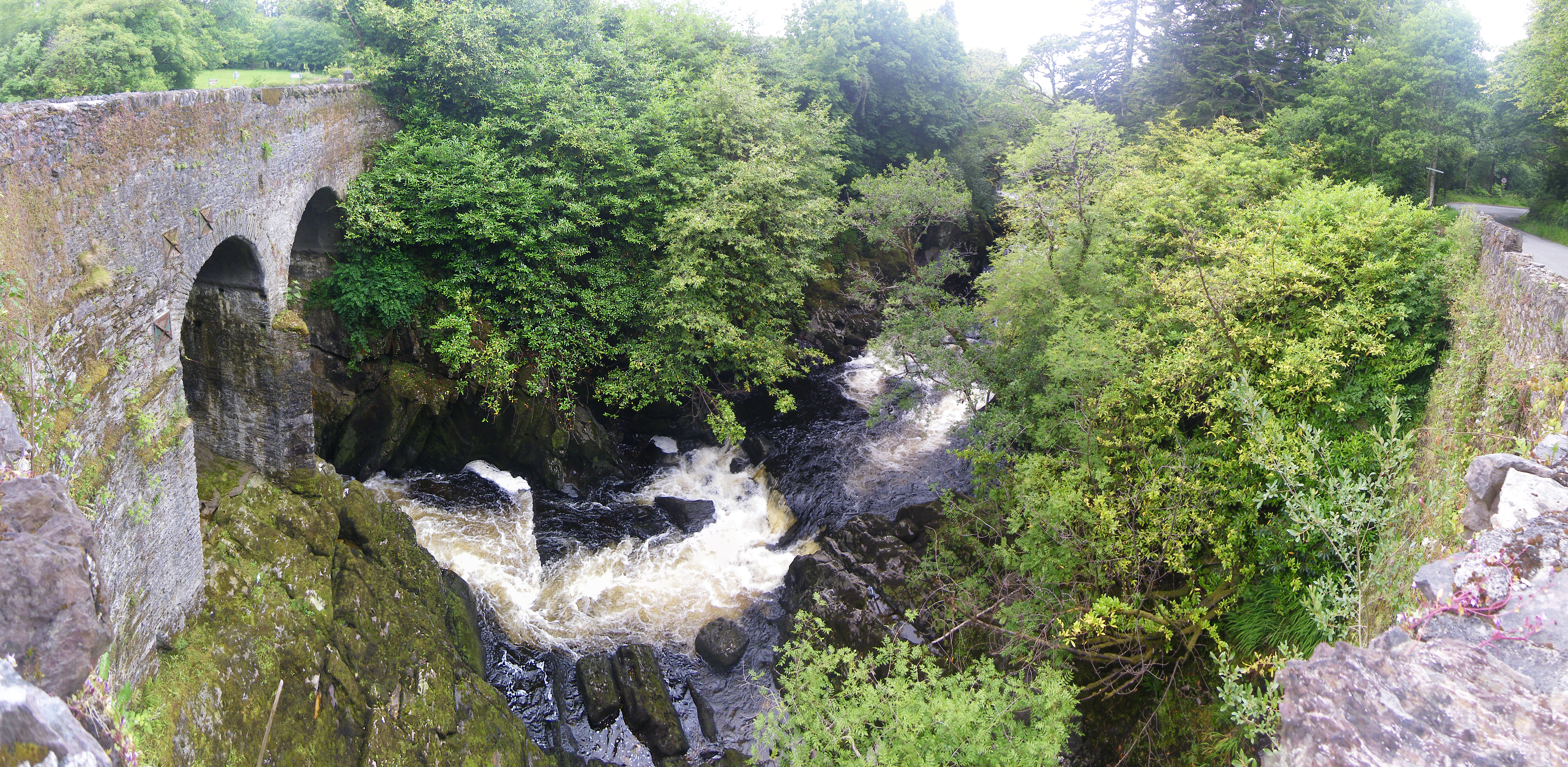
- Bridge over the Blackwater

Location
- Country: Ireland

Physical characteristics
- Source
  - elevation: 600 metres (2,000 ft) above sea level
- Mouth
  - location: Kenmare Bay
- Length: 10 km (6.2 mi)

The Blackwater River or Kerry Blackwater is a river in County Kerry, southwestern Ireland. It is not to be confused with the much longer Munster Blackwater, which also rises in County Kerry.

== Geography ==
The Kerry Blackwater has a drainage basin with an area of 88 square kilometres (34 sq mi) and from its source in Lough Brin to the sea it is 16 kilometres (9.9 mi) long. It enters the sea at Kenmare Bay on the southern side of the Iveragh Peninsula.

== Fisheries ==
The fishing in the Kerry Blackwater is managed by IFI Macroom and the river receives a run of around 1500 salmon and grilse each year. It also receives a good run of sea trout which pass through the river on their way to Logh Brin and its headwaters. Access for anglers to the river is said to be "excellent". Two boats are available for angling use on Lough Brin.

== Natural history and conservation ==
A Special Area of Conservation, protects most of the basin of the Blackwater River. This is one of the areas in which the rare Kerry slug is known to occur. Other rare species which are protected by the SAC include the otter, freshwater pearl mussel, lesser horseshoe bat and Atlantic salmon. The area is of international importance for the lesser horseshoe bat, with one roost site having 150 bats counted there in 1996. The site is also recognised as being of conservation importance for birds, notably the peregrine falcon, merlin, red-billed chough and hen harrier. It is also home to populations of Hesperocodon hederaceus which is scarce in Ireland.

== Culture ==
The area around the Kerry Blackwater is mainly farmland, especially pastures. There is ancient rock art in the basin which is considered to be among the finest in Ireland.

== See also ==
- Blackwater River (disambiguation)
