= UWU (disambiguation) =

UWU or variants may refer to:

- uwu, also stylized UwU, an emoticon indicating cuteness
- Uwu language, also known as the Ayere language
- United Workers Union, an Australian trade union
- Uva Wellassa University, in Sri Lanka
