= Wu Wang =

Wu Wang may refer to:

== Chinese royalty ==
Wu Wang (武王 or 吴王/吳王), may be translated as Prince Wu, King Wu, Prince of Wu, or King of Wu, depending on context:

=== Zhou dynasty ===
- King Wu of Zhou (died 1043 BC), first king of the Zhou dynasty
- King Wu of Chu (died 690 BC), first king of the state of Chu
- Kings of Wu (state):
  - Shoumeng (died 561 BC)
  - Liao of Wu (died 515 BC)
  - Helü (died 496 BC)
  - Fuchai (died 473 BC)
- King Wu of Qin (329–307BC), king of the state of Qin
- King Wuling of Zhao (died 295BC), also known as King Wu of Zhao

=== Nanyue, Han dynasty, and Three Kingdoms ===
- Zhao Tuo (died 137BC), King Wu of Nanyue from 204BC to 196BC
- Liu Pi, Prince of Wu (216–154 BC), prince of the Han dynasty
- Cao Cao (155–220), created Prince Wu of Wei by the Han dynasty
- Sun Quan (182–252), created Prince of Wu by Cao Wei

=== Jin dynasty, Sixteen Kingdoms, and Northern and Southern Dynasties ===
- Zhang Gui (255–314), posthumously honored by the Former Liang as King of Wu
- Emperor Kang of Jin (322–344), known as Prince of Wu from 326 to 327
- Murong Chui (326–396), founding emperor of Later Yan, known as Prince of Wu from 354 to 370 (during the Former Yan)
- Tufa Wugu (died 399), Prince or King Wu of Wuwei, founding ruler of Southern Liang
- Tuoba Yu (died 452), Northern Wei emperor, known as Prince of Wu from 442 to 452

=== Tang dynasty, Balhae and the Five Dynasties ===
- Du Fuwei (598–624), warlord, known as Prince of Wu after 620 when he submitted to the Tang
- Li Ke (died 653), Tang dynasty prince, known as Prince of Wu after 636
- Mu of Balhae (died 737), also known as Wu of Bohai, ruler of Balhae (Bohai)
- Rulers (either Prince or King) of Yang Wu:
  - Yang Xingmi (852–905)
  - Yang Wo (886–908)
  - Yang Longyan (897–920)
  - Yang Pu (900–938)
- Rulers of Wuyue:
  - Qian Liu (852–932), known as Prince of Wu from 903 to 907 (during the Tang dynasty)
  - Qian Yuanguan (887–941), known as Prince of Wu from 933 to 934 (during the Later Tang dynasty)

=== Song dynasty ===
- Li Yu (Southern Tang)
- Zhao Dezhao
- Zhao Yuanyan

=== Yuan, Ming, and Qing dynasties ===
- Zhu Yuanzhang
- Zhang Shicheng
- Koxinga

== See also ==
- Wang Wu (disambiguation)
