= Duke Wu =

Duke Wu or Wu Gong (武公) may refer to the following ancient Chinese rulers:

- Duke Wu of Qi (r. 850–825 BC), ruler of the State of Qi
- Duke Wu of Lu (r. 825–816 BC), ruler of the State of Lu
- Duke Wu of Chen (r. 795–781 BC), ruler of the State of Chen
- Duke Wu of Jin (r. 716–677 BC), also called Duke Wu of Quwo, ruler of the State of Jin
- Duke Wu of Qin (r. 697–678 BC), ruler of the State of Qin
