= Chapter Seven: The Lost Sister =

- Stranger Things episode
- Official poster for the episode by Butcher Billy, featuring Kali (left) and Eleven (right).
- Episode no.: Season 2 Episode 7
- Directed by: Rebecca Thomas
- Written by: Justin Doble
- Original air date: October 27, 2017
- Running time: 46 minutes

Guest appearances
- Linnea Berthelsen as Kali / Eight; Matthew Modine as Dr. Martin Brenner; Kai Greene as Funshine; James Landry Hébert as Axel; Anna Jacoby-Heron as Dottie; Gabrielle Maiden as Mick

Episode chronology
← Previous "Chapter Six: The Spy"	Next → "Chapter Eight: The Mind Flayer"
- Stranger Things season 2

"Chapter Seven: The Lost Sister" is the seventh episode of the second season of the American science fiction horror drama television series Stranger Things. Written by Justin Doble and directed by Rebecca Thomas, it was originally released on Netflix in the United States on October 27, 2017, along with the rest of the second season.

Created by the Duffer Brothers, Stranger Things is set in the 1980s, and follows the supernatural happenings within the fictional town of Hawkins, Indiana. In "The Lost Sister", Eleven (Millie Bobby Brown) discovers from her comatose mother that there is another girl who, like her, was taken by Dr. Martin Brenner (Matthew Modine) to be given supernatural powers. Eleven meets the girl, Kali (Linnea Berthelsen), in Chicago, along with her group of punk friends, who help Kali get revenge on the people that assisted Dr. Brenner in his experiments.

The episode was written mainly out of the Duffers' admiration for Brown's acting in the first season, which they felt could lend itself to a separate storyline about Eleven. They also wished to further explore Eleven's childhood in a way that would ultimately benefit her narrative in the season, helping to build the theme of Eleven mastering her powers. With a different tone than the rest of the series at that point, the idea of it being the second half of the season finale instead of a standalone episode was brainstormed, but ultimately decided against. The look for Kali and Eleven were both heavily scrutinized, with Brown's outfit being partially based on Madonna's style. Upon release, the episode received generally mixed reviews from both critics and fans, with most agreeing that it was the worst episode of the series up to that point. The main reason for the criticism was for its disruption of the narrative that the season had been building up. Berthelsen would go on to reprise her role as Kali in the fifth and final season.

== Background ==
Stranger Things is set in the 1980s, and follows the supernatural happenings occurring in the fictional town of Hawkins, Indiana. It contains an ensemble cast of varying ages, including the adolescent Eleven (Millie Bobby Brown). A girl taken by the villainous Dr. Martin Brenner (Matthew Modine)—who works at the government agency Hawkins National Laboratory—for tests and experiments, Eleven has telekinetic powers. She is one of the many children Dr. Brenner took from their mothers at birth to develop abnormal powers into.

After disappearing at the end of season one, she goes into hiding in a cabin in the woods with Hopper (David Harbour), the Hawkins chief of police who shields her from the government workers. After an argument, Eleven escapes from the cabin while Hopper is out and goes in search of her birth mother, Terry Ives (Aimee Mullins). Terry lives with her sister, Becky (Amy Seimetz), who was told by the doctors who assisted with the birth that Eleven had died during it. Eleven finds Terry in a comatose-like state, and, by going into her mind and going through her memories, realizes that Dr. Brenner stole her away from Terry, who was electrically shocked into being catatonic. This all happens concurrently with the rest of the season's plot, involving the introduction of a new villain, the Mind Flayer, who has infiltrated the body and subconscious of Eleven's friend, Will (Noah Schnapp), and is planning to destroy Hawkins.

== Plot ==
In Terry's memories, Eleven sees a toddler version of herself sitting next to another girl at Hawkins Lab. Eleven, believing this is what Terry has been subconsciously trying to show her, goes through files that Terry kept with Becky. Soon thereafter, they find one regarding the girl. Seeing Becky call for Child Protective Services to take her, Eleven leaves for Chicago in search of the girl. A gang of punks come and threaten her, when one of them, Kali (Linnea Berthelsen), goes to meet her. Eleven recognizes her as the girl, and Kali reveals herself as Eight. Kali shows Eleven her powers, where she can create advanced illusions which alter the perception of others, and the two bond. Kali shows Eleven their hideout, and the gang realizes Eleven's potential to find people's whereabouts just from a photograph. They decide to use this to find an old Hawkins Lab worker and murder him, as revenge for taking children.

Kali introduces the gang to Eleven, who realizes that the rest of them were not from Hawkins Lab, and are outcasts trying to help Kali get vengeance. Kali helps Eleven unlock her potential by thinking of a bad memory, and, utilizing that to strengthen her telekinesis, successfully moves a railcar. Eleven tracks down the worker, Ray (Pruitt Taylor Vince), and the gang quickly robs a market for supplies. At Ray's seemingly empty apartment, the gang find and mug him, with Eleven and Kali condemning him for taking them. He attempts to give them information about Dr. Brenner in exchange for being spared, but Eleven begins to choke Ray. The gang comes in, saying that they found young children in another room that have called the police.

Eleven stops Kali from shooting Ray, and the gang rushes to their hideout. Kali tells Eleven that she is free to go if she pleases, but makes a false illusion of Dr. Brenner to try and manipulate her into staying. Eleven sobs, and has a vision that her friends in Hawkins are in danger from the Mind Flayer. The police raid them, and they all drive away in their van, with Kali creating the illusion of a metal wall coming out of the ground to block the pursuit. Overwhelmed, Eleven runs off, catching a train to Hawkins. An elderly woman asks Eleven where she's going by herself, and she answers that she's going home.

== Production ==
=== Development and writing ===
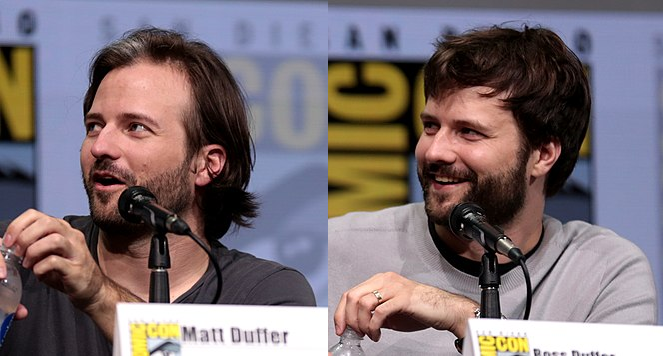
Series creators Matt (left) and Ross (right) Duffer brainstormed many different ideas for "The Lost Sister" before settling on it being its own standalone episode.

"The Lost Sister" was written by Justin Doble, and was the fourth and final episode of Stranger Things that he wrote. Series creators Matt and Ross Duffer were pleased with Millie Bobby Brown's "great" acting in season one and wanted to give her a storyline set entirely around Eleven for season two. They also cited an urge to further explore Eleven's childhood and possible siblings as a catalyst for the episode.

During this period, Kali's character was named Roman, and was described as having a supernatural connection to the events of Hawkins Lab. The episode's tone was reminiscent of urban films from the 1970s-80s like The Terminator (1984), something distinct for the series. This could not be done for an episode set in Hawkins, so the Duffers were able to "play with" theming that they never touched on before. Finn Wolfhard, who portrays Eleven's boyfriend Mike Wheeler, later stated that he was not told about Eleven's storyline in the season, including "The Lost Sister", while he filmed his scenes with the other kids. He asserted, "It was kind of cool, actually. I didn't really know what Millie was doing in her storyline. I was in the dark, and she was in the dark about our storyline, too. It was cool to see it all come together". It was "locked in" to be the seventh episode of the season, according to Matt. This was because Eleven was not present for episode six and was largely absent for eight, so they felt that giving her a standalone installment was a logical continuation. They played with the idea of discarding the episode entirely, but when looking at Eleven's ending for the season, it did not feel earned, and so they considered the episode to be necessary.

They also brainstormed that the episode could be a smaller part of "Chapter Nine: The Gate", the ninth and final episode of the season, where the plot would come into the narrative directly after Eleven closes the gate to the Upside Down—the dirty, alternate dimension where the monsters tormenting Hawkins reside that mirrors the real world. Then, she would spend an hour visiting Chicago to find her sibling before returning in time to go with Mike to the Snow Ball dance. The Duffers asserted that they knew early on that doing an episode akin to "a whole [other] pilot episode" would be a controversial move amongst fans of the series, but enjoyed the writing and casting of the episode. Instead of going with the plan of making it a part of another episode, the Duffers considered the idea of the narrative having its own episode to be smarter, as a "building block" for Eleven's plot.

=== Casting ===
In October 2016, Linnea Berthelsen was given an audition for the series two days after watching Stranger Things for the first time with her boyfriend. To prepare for the role, she researched which movies were used as inspiration for the first season, basing much of her performance off of the Star Wars franchise. Her audition was for a character not yet brainstormed, who was to be finalized when casting concluded. Early on, the episode was titled "The Lost Brother" and Eleven's sibling was meant to be a 30-year-old male who grew up homeless, with the part being cast with a gender neutral actor in mind. In November, it was announced that she had officially joined the cast of the second Stranger Things season. The episode included several guest stars: Kai Greene as Funshine, James Landry Hébert as Axel, Anna Jacoby-Heron as Dottie, and Gabrielle Maiden as Mick, retrospectively, the other members of Kali's punk gang. Matthew Modine appears in "The Lost Sister" as Dr. Martin Brenner, reprising his role for an illusion by Kali after seemingly dying in "Chapter Eight: The Upside Down". Aside from Eleven, the episode contained no other main character from the series, instead introducing new one–off characters.

=== Directing and costume design ===
"The Lost Sister" was directed by Rebecca Thomas. The Duffers chose Thomas for the episode as a result of them wanting to bring in "new talent" to direct episodes. They also took into consideration that Thomas worked on Electrick Children (2012), an independent film which had a similar plot to "The Lost Sister". The song "Runaway" by Bon Jovi is played upon Eleven's arrival in Chicago; there were many songs considered for the scene, but "Runaway" fit it better than any other, so it was chosen. However, the sequence that accompanies the song did not have enough footage, requiring the editors to stretch out the scenes as much as possible to "get [it] to work". This caused Matt to somewhat dislike the song.

"They help her figure out how you wear [the outfit] so it's cool and then she wears them with her socks...She's becoming part of the tribe, but she's doing it in her own way"

— Costume designer Kim Wilcox, E! News

According to the season's costume designer Kim Wilcox, the goal for Eleven's makeover was for her to be "slightly more pop culture but still punk", and took inspiration from singer Madonna's use of punk-like clothing, such as blazers, during the 1980s. She called this style a "hand-me-down", and felt it fit Eleven's character arc in the episode, since she was being given her new clothes by the gang. Wilcox was keen on getting a "strong" jacket for Eleven to sport, and wanted something reminiscent of the 1960s, but still in-style for the 1980s. A jacket that fit this description was eventually found, but it was a modern jacket that was aged by the crew. Brown enjoyed getting to wear a new outfit, especially after wearing the same clothes for all of the first season and the majority of the second.

Berthelsen helped to brainstorm her "dramatic" haircut in the episode. After it was taking a while to settle on one, she told the hair department, "You can go crazy, I don't care". Taking this advice, the hair stylist began to shave her hair, and Brown, who was sitting next to her and had previously shaved her hair for her look in the first season, told her, "You're in for a treat[,] Linnea". The violet part of her hair proved difficult to get "just right", as attempted green and lavender blazes proved to look more innocent than wanted. Berthelsen recalled that she, after returning to her hometown of Copenhagen, had to dye her hair back to black and flip it to cover the shaved part, as to not spoil her role on the series.

== Themes and analysis ==
By giving Eleven a glimpse into the other children Dr. Brenner did experiments on, the episode helps her realize that she was not the only one responsible for the gate to the Upside Down opening, and was only a small part of a larger project involving many kids. Through this, Eleven is also able to come to a better understanding that she is different from her friends like Mike, as Kali says that they will always be "monsters" to normal people, and author Jamie McDaniel interpreted this as the series' take on disabled people. Eleven, Kali, and all other children with abnormal powers act as representative of those with disabilities. McDaniel asserts that it is able to deliver strong commentary on this through Eleven's makeover and quick connection to her new outfit, challenging the "arbitrary nature of conventional cinematic notions of beauty and disability". Eleven spends a significant amount of the series reminiscing about her traumatic time with Dr. Brenner as a child, and has visions of him containing "moments of isolation and trauma" during the second season. This is notably shown when Kali creates an illusion of Dr. Brenner to manipulate Eleven into staying, having it tell her, "You have a wound, Eleven...a terrible wound...and it will spread...and it will kill you". Scholar Tracey Mollet felt that, despite this underlying trauma, the series set out to explicitly show Eleven is not a "helpless victim", and uses anger to push back against her poor childhood, like moving the train car with strength created out of rage. By not killing Ray, she asserts her dominance over those who hurt her, showcasing how strong her rage has made her, and "solidifying her feminist spirit".

A somewhat common theme of the series by season two was its connection to punk ideology—mainly through music—and the way it would attempt to reiterate this, something "The Lost Sister" does more than any other episode, according to author Jennifer Kirby. Kali's outfit style is representative of the "iconology" of punk culture, as is the scene of the gang giving Eleven a punk-style makeover, subverting gender and social norms by replacing her feminine-esque clothes with something more gender neutral. Kirby asserts that Eleven showcases a desire to explore her gender identity throughout the episode, as she is quick to adopt this new persona the gang gives her. Despite this, Kirby felt the episode still failed to deliver meaningful commentary on punk culture, making the gang members more "cartoony" than threatening, thus creating "an artist's rendition" of what they believe punks look like and only working as a means to explore Eleven's identity, rather than representing real world punks in an accurate way. The episode has Eleven learn to "harness" her anger and embrace it fully, giving a reason for her to be able to close the gate in the season finale, but The Mary Sue's Marykate Jasper noted this as being contradictory towards her characteristics the series previously set up. Eleven has been shown to be fine with unleashing her power in battles, but has shown struggles with controlling it; this is something that Jasper felt the episode skipped over.

Eleven's (top right) training with Kali (top left), particularly the former's use of anger to evoke strength, has been compared and contrasted to the relationship between Luke Skywalker (bottom right) and Yoda (bottom left).

Rather than continue from the narrative shown throughout the season, or set up a possible continuation of stories relating to Kali and the gang, "The Lost Sister" takes up its time working as a "test of character" for Eleven. This helps give the audience a look into how far she is willing to go to get revenge on those who wronged her. Through this unique character storytelling, the episode adheres to the concept of "operational aesthetic[s]", in which a series will use an episode to dissect itself and the ways its concept can be stretched. Authors Lynn Kozak and Martin Zeller-Jacques described this as allowing the viewer to speculate on an episode's plot importance rather than showing it right away. The relationship between Eleven and Kali draws parallels to that of the Star Wars characters Luke Skywalker and Yoda, respectively, according to Jeffrey Andrew Weinstock, as the bond between a trainee and mentor. Luke is taught by Yoda in The Empire Strikes Back (1980) how to move objects without touching them through "the force", similar to Kali instructing Eleven to think of bad memories from her past to fuel her power. This also creates a contrast between the two relationships, since Luke is specifically told that "fear, anger, and hate" lead to pain and suffering, while Eleven is instructed to focus exclusively on that rage. Acknowledging the episode's similarities to aspects of Star Wars, the Duffers noted that The Empire Strikes Back was frequently used as inspiration during production of the episode. They stated that Eleven's interactions with Kali were purposefully reminiscent of her "[pulling] to the dark side"—a common theme of Star Wars—and learning to make decisions for herself through this.

== Release ==
Along with the rest of the second season, the episode was first released on Netflix on October 27, 2017. Regarding viewers who watched the season on a television set, "The Lost Sister" was the seventh most-watched episode of the season at 5.3 million viewers, marking a decrease of 1.1 million from the previous episode, "Chapter Six: The Spy". It received a 3.7% share among adults between the ages of 18 and 49, meaning that it was seen by 3.7% of all households who watched the show within three days of its premiere in that demographic. It was first released on home video in the United States on November 6, 2018, in the Stranger Things 2 DVD/Blu-ray-combo box set in a vintage CBS-FOX VHS-inspired packaging.

== Reception ==
The majority of reviews for the episode were either negative or mixed, with criticism going towards its departure from the narrative of the season and introduction of new characters. Laura Bradley called the episode the only misstep in a season she otherwise enjoyed in her review for Vanity Fair. Bradley criticized how far in the season the episode came into play, since Kali and her gang appear briefly in the cold opening of "Chapter One: MADMAX", something she felt the majority of viewers would have forgotten by the time they got to "The Lost Sister". She also criticized the predictably of the plot for how it is easy to assume that Eleven would make her way back to Hawkins by the end of the episode, creating an episode more akin to a backdoor pilot than a successful standalone, and how the Chicago setting did not add to the lessons Eleven learned in the episode. She ended her review by praising Brown's performance as being "as moving as ever". Vulture writer Hillary Kelly gave the episode 3 out of 5 stars in her recap of its events, writing, "There is absolutely no reason this episode had to be made". Kelly criticized how much of an outlier the episode felt from the rest of the series, even if she shared the sentiment that Brown's performance elevated it, and described the scenes of Kali reminiscing on her childhood as "overdramatized schlock".

Entertainment Weekly's Derek Lawrence condemned the episode's placement for disrupting the momentum of the narrative of the season and not picking up on the cliffhanger left by the previous episode. Lawrence did give praise towards the dialogue, highlighting several lines as her joint-favorite quotes from the episode, such as Eleven's repeating of the phrase "Bitchin'", which he described as "adorabl[e]". "The Lost Sister" was ranked as the worst episode of the first two seasons by The Hollywood Reporter's Josh Wigler, commending it for being the series' "biggest swing", but felt its execution was not strong. Aside from feeling that Kali was a semblance of a memorable character, Wigler criticized the introduction of new, uninteresting characters, ending his review by commenting, "If [this] is the future of Stranger Things, it's a bleak future indeed." Fan reviews of the episode were also highly negative. The main criticisms from fans were the placement of the disjointed episode in the season's timeline, combined with taking Eleven away from Hawkins into an unknown place.

Not all reviews of "The Lost Sister" were negative, however. IGN's David Griffin acknowledged the divided nature of the episode amongst fans and critics, but said that he knew the Duffers would be able to pull it off. Calling it "one of the better episodes of the entire series", Griffin highlighted Kali's character, noting it for likely leaving a lasting impression on Eleven in future installments, along with the episode's compelling theme of getting revenge, something he felt made for a "pleasant hour" of the series that "will be difficult to forget". Price Peterson of Yahoo! Entertainment praised the episode, particularly Eleven's scenes opposite Kali, the punk gang—which he called his favorite thing to come out of the series by that point—and the world building the episode did for areas outside Hawkins. Peterson asserted that he "loved" the episode, enjoying that Eleven was given someone to relate to, regardless of whether she would return or not. Caroline Framke of Vox acknowledged the odd inclusion of the episode in the season, and stated that she did not disagree with most of the criticism the episode garnered, but still felt it was a good way for the series to stray away from its formula that she agreed had gotten stale. By doing a standalone episode that took Eleven away from Hawkins and the audience from the season's compelling conflicts, Framke noted the episode for expanding the possible scope of Stranger Things, praising "The Lost Sister" for giving Eleven a character who is able to relate to her trauma.

== Legacy ==
Following the premiere of "The Lost Sister", many fans assumed that the episode was meant to be a backdoor pilot for a spin-off series about Kali and her gang. Executive producer Shawn Levy dispelled the theory, writing that it was just meant to be a standalone episode, and that he respected the Duffers for "taking that big swing". In February 2018, the American sketch comedy series Saturday Night Live parodied the episode in a sketch starring Natalie Portman as Eleven. It features Eleven as she finds others with supernatural powers, but the majority are underwhelming, such as a man whose nose bleeds every time he makes chili, and a woman who is 50, saying, "I'm 50. I'm just 50 years old".

After the episode's release, the Duffers stated that they wanted to bring Kali back in the future, but were unsure if this would be possible. They called it a "loose end" that they wanted to explore more in subsequent episodes and felt leaving it open-ended allowed for more storytelling potential. Kali would ultimately return in the fifth and final season, which the Duffers credited to a desire to not leave a "mistake" episode without a proper continuation. In the finale, Kali—after assisting Eleven and the rest of the characters in their plan to stop Vecna, the season's main villain—dies when she is shot by a government worker. (Note: While Kali is shown being shot and is declared dead by the characters, near the end of the episode, Mike creates a theory that Kali might have faked her death in an attempt to create an illusion that stopped the government workers from taking Eleven, allowing her to live freely. Her fate is left up to interpretation, giving the audience the choice to either believe this as fact or disregard it as simply a theory.)
