= Chapter Seven =

Chapter Seven refers to a seventh chapter in a book.

Chapter Seven, Chapter 7, or Chapter VII may also refer to:

== Albums ==
- Chapter Seven (album), a 2013 album by Damien Leith.
- Chapter VII (album), a 1973 album by drummer Buddy Miles
- Chapter VII: Hope & Sorrow

== Television ==
- "Chapter 7" (American Horror Story)
- "Chapter 7" (Eastbound & Down)
- "Chapter 7" (House of Cards)
- "Chapter 7" (Legion)
- "Chapter 7" (Star Wars: Clone Wars), an episode of Star Wars: Clone Wars
- "Chapter 7" (Uncoupled)
- "Chapter 7: In the Name of Honor", an episode of The Book of Boba Fett
- "Chapter 7: The Reckoning", an episode of The Mandalorian
- "Chapter 7: Retreat", an episode of A Murder at the End of the World
- "Chapter Seven" (Boston Public)
- "Chapter Seven: Blind Deaf Date", an episode of Special
- "Chapter Seven: Feast of Feasts", an episode of Chilling Adventures of Sabrina
- "Chapter Seven: In a Lonely Place", an episode of Riverdale
- "Chapter Seven: Kiss of the Spider Woman", an episode of Katy Keene
- "Chapter Seven: Loud, Fast, and Keep Going", an episode of Barry
- Episodes of Stranger Things:
  - "Chapter Seven: The Bathtub", season 1
  - "Chapter Seven: The Lost Sister", season 2
  - "Chapter Seven: The Bite", season 3
  - "Chapter Seven: The Massacre at Hawkins Lab", season 4
  - "Chapter Seven: The Bridge", season 5

== Other uses ==
- Chapter 7, Title 11, United States Code, bankruptcy code
- Chapter VII of the Constitution of Australia
- Chapter VII of the United Nations Charter, the chapter that sets out the UN Security Council's powers to maintain peace
- "Chapter Seven", song by Jay Chou from the 2006 album Still Fantasy
