= The Gilded Age (TV series) =

American historical drama television series

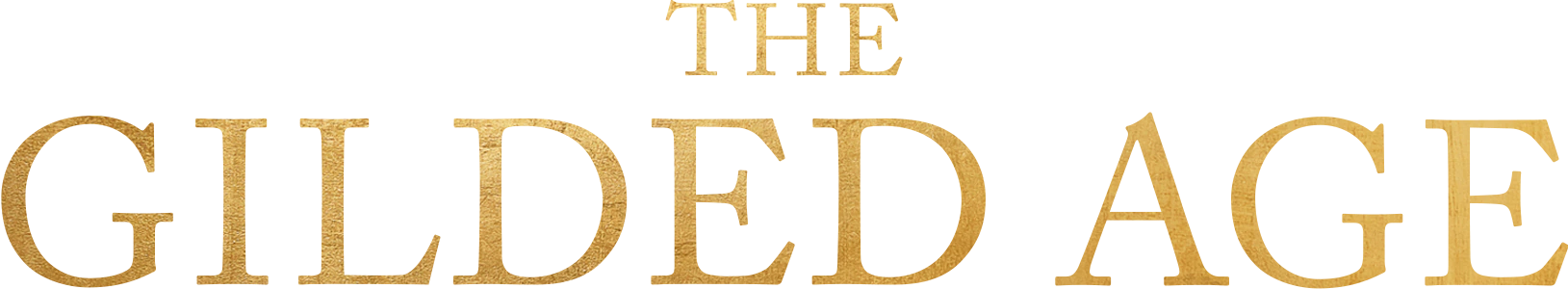
- Genre: Historical drama
- Created by: Julian Fellowes
- Written by: Julian Fellowes; Sonja Warfield; Davita Scarlett
- Directed by: Michael Engler; Salli Richardson Whitfield; Deborah Kampmeier; Crystle Roberson
- Starring: Carrie Coon; Morgan Spector; Louisa Jacobson; Denée Benton; Taissa Farmiga; Harry Richardson; Blake Ritson; Thomas Cocquerel; Simon Jones; Jack Gilpin; Cynthia Nixon; Christine Baranski; Ben Ahlers; Michael Cerveris; Celia Keenan-Bolger; Debra Monk; Donna Murphy; Kristine Nielsen; Kelli O'Hara; Patrick Page; Taylor Richardson; Douglas Sills; John Douglas Thompson; Erin Wilhelmi; Kelley Curran; Sullivan Jones; Ben Lamb; Ashlie Atkinson; Jordan Donica
- Composers: Harry Gregson-Williams; Rupert Gregson-Williams
- Country of origin: United States
- Original language: English
- No. of seasons: 4
- No. of episodes: 28

Production
- Executive producers: Julian Fellowes; Gareth Neame; David Crockett; Michael Engler; Salli Richardson Whitfield; Sonja Warfield; Robert Greenblatt
- Producers: Holly Rymon; Claire M. Shanley; Luke Harlan
- Running time: 46–80 minutes
- Production companies: Neamo Film and Television; Universal Television; HBO Entertainment

Original release
- Network: HBO
- Release: January 24, 2022 – present

Title card

The Gilded Age is an American historical drama television series created and written by Julian Fellowes for HBO that is set in the United States during the Gilded Age, the boom years of the 1880s, in New York City. Originally announced in 2018 for NBC, it was later announced in May 2019 that the show had been moved to HBO. The first season premiered on January 24, 2022. In July 2025, the series was renewed for a fourth season, which premiered on November 1, 2026. Shortly after the fourth season premiered, HBO announced that the series had been renewed for a fifth.

The series has received positive reviews, with particular praise for the costumes and performances of lead actors Carrie Coon, Morgan Spector, Cynthia Nixon, and Christine Baranski. At the 76th Primetime Emmy Awards, the second season received six nominations, including Outstanding Drama Series and acting nods for Coon and Baranski.

== Synopsis ==
Set in the 1880s, The Gilded Age is a period drama that depicts the cultural and technological changes that took place in the late-19th century United States. The show "highlights the tension between New York City's old and new monied elite," with the van Rhijn family representing the former and the Russell family representing the latter. The Gilded Age focuses on the efforts made by the character Bertha Russell (the wife of robber baron George Russell) to ascend to the top of Manhattan's social ladder.

Brian Phillips of The Ringer describes the show this way: "The new-money Russells, fresh from robber-baroning their way to untold piles of lucre, move in across the street from the old-money Mrs. van Rhijn. Mrs. Russell, played by the brilliant Carrie Coon, is determined to gate-crash the opera boxes of the elite; Mrs. van Rhijn, played by the brilliant Christine Baranski, is determined to look down her nose at anyone whose family fortune is younger than the Declaration of Independence".

== Cast and characters ==
=== Main ===
- Carrie Coon as Bertha Russell, the matriarch of the Russell family.
- Morgan Spector as George Russell, Bertha's husband, and a classic robber baron.
- Louisa Jacobson as Marian Brook, the orphaned niece of Agnes van Rhijn and Ada (Brook) Forte, who comes to live with her estranged aunts at East 61st Street following the death of her father.
- Denée Benton as Peggy Kirkland (née Scott), an African American woman who works as Agnes van Rhijn's secretary.
- Taissa Farmiga as Gladys Vere, Duchess of Buckingham (née Russell), the younger child and only daughter of the Russell family.
- Harry Richardson as Larry Russell, son of Bertha and George Russell.
- Blake Ritson as Oscar van Rhijn, son of Agnes van Rhijn.
- Thomas Cocquerel as Tom Raikes (season 1), a young attorney.
- Simon Jones as Mr. Alfred Bannister, the van Rhijns' English butler.
- Jack Gilpin as Mr. Church, the Russell family's butler.
- Cynthia Nixon as Ada Forte (née Brook), the younger sister of Agnes van Rhijn.
- Christine Baranski as Agnes van Rhijn (née Brook), is the widowed matriarch of the van Rhijn Family.
- Ben Ahlers as John "Jack" Trotter (seasons 2–present; recurring: season 1), a footman and a jack-of-all trades in the van Rhijn household.
- Michael Cerveris as Mr. Watson (season 2; recurring: season 1), George Russell's valet.
- Celia Keenan-Bolger as Mrs. Bruce (seasons 2–present; recurring: season 1), the Russells' housekeeper.
- Debra Monk as Mrs. Armstrong (seasons 2–present; recurring: season 1), Mrs. van Rhijn's lady's maid.
- Donna Murphy as Caroline Schermerhorn Astor (seasons 2–present; recurring: season 1), a prominent American socialite.
- Kristine Nielsen as Mrs. Bauer (seasons 2–present; recurring: season 1), Agnes van Rhijn's cook.
- Kelli O'Hara as Aurora Fane (seasons 2–present; recurring: season 1), Agnes van Rhijn's niece by marriage.
- Patrick Page as Richard Clay (seasons 2–3; recurring: season 1), George Russell's secretary.
- Taylor Richardson as Bridget (seasons 2–present; recurring: season 1), the van Rhijns' housemaid.
- Douglas Sills as Monsieur Baudin (seasons 2–present; recurring: season 1), the French chef to the Russell household. He is later revealed as Josh Borden, an American from Kansas.
- John Douglas Thompson as Arthur Scott (season 2–present; recurring: season 1), pharmacist and father of Peggy Scott.
- Erin Wilhelmi as Adelheid Weber (seasons 2–present; recurring: season 1), Gladys Russell's lady's maid.
- Kelley Curran as Mrs Enid van Rhijn (née Turner) (seasons 2–present; recurring: season 1), Bertha Russell's former lady's maid, who has big plans for herself and society. In Seasons 2 and 3 she was married to widower Joshua Winterton until his death.
- Sullivan Jones as T. Thomas Fortune (seasons 2–3; recurring: season 1), publisher of the weekly New York Globe.
- Ben Lamb as Hector Vere, 5th Duke of Buckingham (seasons 3–present; recurring: season 2), a member of the British aristocracy. (Note: Although a title of duke of Buckingham has existed in the British peerages, the character of Hector Vere is fictional, as the real-life Richard Temple-Nugent-Brydges-Chandos-Grenville, 3rd Duke of Buckingham and Chandos was in his 60s in the 1880s.)
- Ashlie Atkinson as Mamie Fish (season 4; recurring: seasons 1–3), American socialite.
- Jordan Donica as Dr. William Kirkland (season 4; recurring: season 3), an African American doctor from the prominent Kirkland family.

=== Recurring ===
- Audra McDonald as Dorothy Scott, Peggy Scott's mother and a skilled pianist.
- Jeanne Tripplehorn as Sylvia Chamberlain (season 1), a woman with a scandalous past.
- Claybourne Elder as John Adams (seasons 1–3), a descendant of President John Adams and Oscar van Rhijn's former lover.
- Katie Finneran as Anne Morris (season 1; guest: season 4), a socialite who makes herself an enemy to the Russells.
- Amy Forsyth as Carrie Astor (seasons 1 and 3–present; guest: season 2), the fourth daughter of Mrs. Astor, who befriends Gladys.
- John Sanders as Stanford White (season 1), an architect.
- Zuzanna Szadkowski as Mabel Ainsley (season 1), George Russell's stenographer.
- Linda Emond as Clara Barton (season 1), founder of the American Red Cross.
- Ward Horton as Charles Fane (seasons 1–2; guest: season 3), husband of Aurora Fane and one of the city's aldermen.
- Rebecca Haden as Flora McNeil (season 1; guest: season 2), a wealthy socialite.
- Nathan Lane as Ward McAllister (seasons 1–3).
- Robert Sean Leonard as Luke Forte (season 2), an unmarried clergyman from Massachusetts.
- Christopher Denham as Robert McNeil (season 2), a wealthy banker.
- David Furr as Dashiell Montgomery (season 2), a widowed cousin of the van Rhijns and Aurora Fane.
- Matilda Lawler as Frances Montgomery (season 2), Dashiell Montgomery's adolescent daughter.
- Jeremy Shamos as Mr. Gilbert (season 2), a financier working to open the new Metropolitan Opera House.
- Laura Benanti as Susan Blane (season 2), a widow.
- Nicole Brydon Bloom as Maud Beaton (season 2; guest: season 3), a young and wealthy socialite.
- Dakin Matthews as Joshua Winterton (season 2), a wealthy, elderly widower.
- Rachel Pickup as Miss André (season 3; guest: season 2), Bertha Russell's new lady's maid.
- Bill Camp as J. P. Morgan (season 3–present), a businessman.
- Paul Alexander Nolan as Alfred Merrick (season 3), a wealthy New York businessman.
- Hannah Shealy as Charlotte Drayton (née Astor) (season 3), the third daughter of Mrs. Astor.
- Phylicia Rashad as Elizabeth Kirkland (season 3–present), Dr. Kirkland's mother and a prominent socialite from Newport.
- Jessica Frances Dukes as Athena Trumbo (season 3–present), Dorothy Scott's cousin.
- Brian Stokes Mitchell as Frederick Kirkland (season 3–present), patriarch of the Kirkland family.
- Andrea Martin as Madame Dashkova (season 3), a medium.
- Hattie Morahan as Lady Sarah Vere (season 3; guest: season 4), the Duke's sister.
- Marceline Hugot as Mrs. Foster (season 4; guest: season 3), member of the New York Heritage Society.
- Taylor Trensch as Oliver (season 4), an inexperienced footman hired by Ada Forte.

=== Guest ===
- Michel Gill as Patrick Morris (season 1), Anne Morris' husband and one of the city's aldermen.
- Bill Irwin as Cornelius Eckhard (season 1), Ada Forte's childhood acquaintance.
- Sandra Caldwell as Ellen (seasons 1 and 3), the Scotts’ maid.
- Tom Blyth as Archie Baldwin (season 1), a young investment banker.
- Stephen Spinella as Julius Cuyper (season 1), a banker.
- Jordan Waller as Oscar Wilde (season 2).
- Michael Braugher as Booker T. Washington (season 2).
- Amber Gray as Bea Sturt (season 2), a restaurant owner in Alabama.
- Liz Wisan as Emily Warren Roebling (season 2).
- Melanie Nicholls-King as Sarah J. Garnet (season 2).
- Matt Walker as Billy Carlton (seasons 2–3), a young man from a wealthy family.
- Victoria Clark as Joan Carlton (season 3), Billy's Carlton's mother.
- Bobby Steggert as John Singer Sargent (season 3).
- Merritt Wever as Monica O'Brien (season 3), Bertha Russell's estranged sister.
- Lucas Iverson as Simon (season 3–present), a friend of Larry Russell.
- Michael Cumpsty as Lord Mildmay (season 3), a British nobleman.
- LisaGay Hamilton as Frances Watkins Harper (season 3).
- Peter McRobbie as Risley Sage (season 3).
- Kate Baldwin as Nancy Adams Bell (season 3), John Adams' sister.
- Leslie Uggams as Ernestine Brown (season 3), a friend of Elizabeth Kirkland.
- Dylan Baker as Dr. Logan (season 3–present), the Russell family doctor.
- Neal Huff as John D. Rockefeller (season 4)
- Will Pullen as Will Morris Jr. (season 4), son of Patrick and Anne Morris.
- Elizabeth Marvel as Virginia Saville (season 4), a nurse working with Marian Brook at a settlement house.
- Bonnie Milligan as Mrs. Knapp Curtis (season 4), a journalist.
- Dennis Haysbert as Dr. Reginald Harris (season 4), a mentor of Dr. Kirkland.
- Maggie Kuntz as Fiona Summers (season 4), a cousin of the Astors.
- James Scully as Lee Klein (season 4), a recently apprenticed painter.
- Adrienne Warren as Ava (season 4), Peggy Scott's cousin.

Matt Damon and David Letterman make uncredited cameo appearances in the fourth season premiere.

== Episodes ==
Season	Episodes	Originally released	
Season	Episodes	First released	Last released
1	9	January 24, 2022	March 21, 2022
2	8	October 29, 2023	December 17, 2023
3	8	June 22, 2025	August 10, 2025
4	8	November 1, 2026	December 20, 2026

=== Season 1 (2022) ===
No. overall	No. in season	Title	Directed by	Written by	Original release date	U.S. viewers (millions)
1	1	"Never the New"	Michael Engler	Julian Fellowes	January 24, 2022	0.463
In 1882, New York City, ultra-wealthy industrialist George Russell moves into an elaborate Stanford White-designed mansion with wife, Bertha, and their young-adult children, Larry and Gladys. Across the street, widowed Agnes van Rhijn and her spinster sister, Ada Brook, await the arrival of their niece Marian Brook, a modern-thinking young woman leaving Doylestown, Pennsylvania after her bankrupt father's death. Peggy Scott, a graduate of the Institute for Colored Youth, assists when Marian's purse and train ticket are stolen at the train station. Marian's aunts allow Peggy, whose family lives in Brooklyn, to stay over when bad weather cancels the ferry. Impressed by Peggy's penmanship, Agnes offers a job as her secretary, displeasing Armstrong, Agnes' racist lady's maid, though the other staff are more welcoming. Peggy's mother, Dorothy, urges her to reconcile with her estranged father, Arthur. In Newport, Agnes's son, Oscar, meets Larry at a party hosted by socialite Mamie Fish. Both meet Marian upon returning to New York. Bertha hosts a lavish soiree to break into society; Marian secretly attends, knowing Agnes, who considers Bertha "new money," will disapprove. No one notable attends, shunning Bertha, who vows revenge.
2	2	"Money Isn't Everything"	Michael Engler	Julian Fellowes	January 31, 2022	0.598
Marian's Doylestown lawyer, Tom Raikes, moves to New York City and romantically pursues her. Aspiring writer Peggy has sent query letters to publishers without any replies. Marian arranges for Peggy to consult with Tom Raikes regarding an unknown legal matter. Meanwhile, Bertha offers her ballroom for Mrs. Morris's and Mrs. Fane's upcoming charity bazaar should it be needed. Changed circumstances move the bazaar to a hotel, snubbing Bertha's offer. Offended, Bertha and George attend the bazaar where George proceeds to buy everything, effectively closing the event just as it starts. George strikes a deal with Alderman Patrick Morris, in which Morris and other aldermen will buy George's company stock on margin, then pass a law allowing George to build a new train station in the city, resulting in huge profits for everyone.
3	3	"Face the Music"	Salli Richardson Whitfield	Julian Fellowes	February 7, 2022	0.542
George learns the law will be repealed and that the aldermen are manipulating the stock to their advantage. The legislators sell short, promising to deliver shares at a lower price expecting them to go down. In retaliation, George buys back as much company stock as possible, raising the value and driving the aldermen into poverty by forcing them to buy at the now higher price. Peggy declines the Christian Advocate's offer to publish her story due to their racist conditions. Oscar van Rhijn, seeking to marry a wealthy heiress, schemes to court Gladys Russell, much to his lover John Adams's chagrin. Ada's former suitor, Cornelius Eckhard, calls on her. Years earlier, Ada's father rejected him, knowing Eckhard considered Ada a "meal ticket". When Agnes discreetly informs Eckhard that Ada is penniless and they cannot live in her home should they marry, his pursuit abruptly ends. Tom Raikes proposes to Marian, who delays answering, knowing Agnes considers him socially inferior and will oppose the match. After George has bought back his company stock, inflating the price the alderman must pay on margin call, they beg him to stop, but he is merciless. Facing financial ruin, Alderman Morris commits suicide.
4	4	"A Long Ladder"	Salli Richardson Whitfield	Julian Fellowes	February 14, 2022	0.604
George offers to help Alderman Charles Fane to financially recover from the stocks debacle on condition that his wife, Aurora, helps introduce Bertha into the old money circles. New York Globe editor T. Thomas Fortune publishes Peggy's story and hires her to write an article about women's political affiliations without voting representation. When Agnes's English butler, Bannister, tours the Russell house he offends Church, the Russels' butler, by mildly disparaging the American culinary choices and table setting practices. Sylvia Chamberlain, a widow tainted by rumors she was her late husband's mistress, attempts to befriend Marian. Bertha's maid, Turner, unsuccessfully attempts to seduce George. The van Rhijn's house maid, Bridget, rebuff's footman Jack Trotter's romantic interest. She distrusts men and reveals to house cook Mrs. Bauer that her father sexually abused her. While visiting her parents in Brooklyn, Peggy and her father, Arthur, argue about her job. Marian, believing the Scotts are poor, arrives unannounced intending to give used shoes as charity, offending the family. At a concert with Bertha and the Fanes, Marian runs into Tom Raikes, who is the Schermerhorns' guest. Marian insists Tom must win over her aunts before accepting his marriage proposal.
5	5	"Charity Has Two Functions"	Salli Richardson Whitfield	Julian Fellowes	February 21, 2022	0.631
Bertha considers Gladys' suitor, Archie Baldwin, an unsuitable match, despite his being from a wealthy, old money family. Armstrong tends to her abusive invalid mother who lives in a tenement apartment. With Aurora Fane's guidance, Bertha seeks society influencer Ward McAllister's assistance in climbing New York's social ladder. Aurora, Bertha, Marian, and Tom Raikes travel to Dansville to hear Clara Barton speak at a Red Cross branch opening. Peggy accompanies them to write an article for The Globe and to chaperone Marian. Miss Barton notes how the wealthy use charity to enhance their social standing. Later at the hotel, Peggy purposefully interrupts Tom and Marian's romantic encounter. Privately, Peggy tells Marian a man she loved was considered unsuitable by her family. Marian apologizes for her earlier misunderstanding about Peggy's family's finances. Oscar recruits Turner as a spy in his quest to marry Gladys. George issues Archie an ultimatum: accept a lucrative banking position and stop pursuing Gladys or else never work in finance again. Archie, shaken, abruptly departs, leaving Gladys upset and confused. George's secretary, Richard Clay, arrives to report that a company train derailed outside Millbourne, Pennsylvania. George and Bertha prepare to address the crisis.
6	6	"Heads Have Rolled for Less"	Salli Richardson Whitfield	Julian Fellowes	February 28, 2022	0.682
With five people confirmed dead, George seeks to uncover the train derailment's cause, eventually learning that someone inside his company substituted substandard train axles as new. Bertha is voted onto the Red Cross board, enraging Anne Morris, who blames George for her husband's suicide. Peggy's interview with Clara Barton increases the Globe's subscriptions. After their meeting at Mamie Fish's tea party. Carrie Astor later offers Gladys suggestions for her debutante ball that pleases Bertha. Larry confides in Marian his secret desire to become an architect. Marian elicits a Red Cross donation from Mrs. Chamberlain, who confirms the rumor regarding her and her husband. Van Rhijn butler Bannister secretly accepts Bertha's offer to serve an English-style luncheon for Ward McAllister, greatly offending Church. When Agnes receives an anonymous note exposing Bannister, she angrily interrupts the luncheon to confront Bannister, then awkwardly retreats. Armstrong witnesses Oscar and Turner talking on the street and reports it to Agnes, framing it as an inappropriate liaison. A railroad employee claims George instructed him to use substandard axles.
7	7	"Irresistible Change"	Michael Engler	Julian Fellowes	March 7, 2022	0.750
George unveils plans for a new electric-powered train station. George reconsiders allowing Larry to study architecture. Prompted by Carrie Astor, Bertha sets a date for Gladys's debutante ball. George may face manslaughter charges for the train crash. Agnes sends Marian to inform Bertha that Turner may be having an inappropriate affair while withholding Oscar's name. Bertha later observes Turner flirtatious behavior with Larry and dismisses her. Agnes is convinced Tom Raikes is only courting Marian for social advancement. The city readies for Thomas Edison's electric power distribution ceremony, during which he will activate his Pearl Street generating station. Bertha excludes Marian from her carriage party to witness the event to instead invite Tom Raikes and Cissie Bingham, the rumored illegitimate daughter of Henry Flagler. Peggy and Fortune also attend the event as reporters. Edison's electric lights amaze everyone assembled.
8	8	"Tucked Up in Newport"	Michael Engler	Julian Fellowes	March 14, 2022	0.701
George prepares for trial while Bertha plans Gladys's debutante ball. Oscar travels to Newport with the Russell family to court Gladys, but John Adams thwarts him. Aurora Fane distrusts Tom Raikes after seeing him and Miss Bingham flirting, but Marian accepts his marriage proposal and they plan to elope. George's valet, Watson, has been observing Mrs. Flora McNeil from outside her home. When she confronts him, he introduces himself as "Collyer", causing her to quickly go inside. Agnes' maid, Armstrong, intercepts Tom's letter to Peggy, forcing Peggy to reveal to the van Rhijn-Brook family that her father forcibly annulled her marriage after she bore a stillborn son. Peggy resigns when Agnes is reluctant to fire Armstrong for misrepresenting the situation. When Jack visits his mother's cenotaph grave, Bridget secretly follows but is discovered. He reveals that his mother was a victim of the Peshtigo Fire and that his other family members are dead or estranged. By chance through Marian, George Russell discovers his stenographer Miss Ainsley and George Dixon framed him for the railroad negligence and the charges are dismissed. In Newport, McCallister takes Bertha to see Mrs. Astor's grand home, believing Astor is still in New York. When Mrs. Astor arrives a day early, Bertha is rushed out through the back servant area.
9	9	"Let the Tournament Begin"	Michael Engler	Julian Fellowes	March 21, 2022	0.813
Back in New York, Bertha's call upon Mrs. Astor is declined. Insulted, Bertha rescinds Carrie Astor's invitation to Gladys's debutante ball, upsetting Carrie. Marian prepares to elope with Tom, assisted by Peggy and Mrs. Chamberlain. Over George's protests, Bertha fires French chef Baudin upon learning he is actually Josh Borden, an American from Wichita, Kansas who trained in France. Tom jilts Marian on their elopement day to instead marry into money. Peggy learns her father Arthur lied and that her infant son lived and was adopted. She and her mother leave for Philadelphia to search for him. George and Bertha employ every tactic to entice the old-money crowd to attend Gladys' ball. Mrs. Astor makes amends with Bertha by agreeing to come and persuades society friends to also attend, including the van Rhijn-Brook family. Broken-hearted Marian awkwardly runs into Tom Raikes, who is attending the ball with Miss Bingham. The ball is nearly derailed when Borden's replacement chef gets drunk and is unable to cook. Church summons Borden, who returns to help. The ball is a success and Borden is rehired. Ada comforts broken-hearted Marian, assuring her better days are ahead.

=== Season 2 (2023) ===
No. overall	No. in season	Title	Directed by	Written by	Original release date	U.S. viewers (millions)
10	1	"You Don't Even Like Opera"	Michael Engler	Julian Fellowes	October 29, 2023	0.452
In 1883, juxtaposed Easter Sunday services are held: the Scotts at a Black congregation in Philadelphia, and the other for affluent New York residents (including the Astors, the Russells, and the van Rhijns). Reverend Luke Forte, the new rector, mentions that Tom Raikes is marrying Miss Bingham. Widower Dashiell Montgomery, Agnes's nephew by marriage, moves to New York with adolescent daughter Frances. Snubbed by Mrs. Astor's opera community, Bertha supports the new Metropolitan Opera over the established Academy of Music. She wants the nouveau riche to buy opera boxes and later attract the old-money crowd. George and other robber barons face labor issues. Oscar arrives at Agnes's house bloodied and beaten after a homosexual encounter. Wanting a rich wife and to propagate the van Rhijn line, Oscar proposes to Gladys, promising independence while secretly maintaining his gay life. At her dinner for key opera patrons, Bertha surprises guests with a famous opera singer, prominently displaying her growing influence. Peggy and her parents meet the Philadelphia family that adopted Peggy's son, who has since died.
11	2	"Some Sort of Trick"	Deborah Kampmeier	Julian Fellowes	November 5, 2023	0.355
Gladys refuses to go to Newport until Oscar's marriage proposal is settled. George, knowing Oscar's true intent, convinces Gladys to marry for love rather than to escape her domineering mother. Marian continues teaching watercolor classes despite Agnes' disapproval. Agnes warns Armstrong to treat Peggy respectfully when she resumes her secretarial job. In Newport, wealthy widow Mrs. Blane hires Larry to renovate her home. Their relationship soon becomes romantic, much to Bertha's disapproval. Aurora Fane attempts to match Marian with wealthy Edward Morgan, who turns out to be a drunken dandified bore. When Chicago iron and steel workers strike for better pay and working conditions, George intends to avoid similar problems at his Pittsburgh mills by bribing the union representative. The Russells are shocked that the wealthy Mr. Winterton's new wife, Enid, is Bertha's former maid, Turner. Ada is smitten with the unmarried Rev. Forte.
12	3	"Head to Head"	Michael Engler	Julian Fellowes & Sonja Warfield	November 12, 2023	0.513
The Opera War between Bertha and Mrs. Astor intensifies. Bertha eagerly anticipates the impending New York visit of Hector, Duke of Buckingham. Dashiell courts Marian, who appears ambivalent. Bertha maneuvers to force New York's elite to choose between supporting the Academy of Music or the new Metropolitan Opera House. Mrs. Astor recruits Agnes to help generate support for the Academy of Music. Pittsburgh union leader Mr. Henderson rejects George's attempt to bribe him and bust the union. Bertha angrily confronts George after Mrs. Winterton (Turner) mentions their previous encounter. Bertha believes George that nothing happened but is furious he withheld this. Peggy covers the new dormitory opening at a Black school in Tuskegee, Alabama, but the Scotts worry she is too naive about the racism there. Playwright Oscar Wilde, in New York for his play Vera; or, The Nihilists, is attracted to John Adams, Oscar van Rhijn's former lover. Watson's wealthy son-in-law, Mr. McNeil, offers him financial support if he permanently moves away. Watson insists that his daughter Flora must make the request. Ada discreetly spends time with Reverend Forte.
13	4	"His Grace the Duke"	Deborah Kampmeier	Julian Fellowes	November 19, 2023	0.482
Bertha shows Aurora Fane, Mrs. Winterton, and others the unfinished Metropolitan Opera House, hoping they will purchase boxes. Mr. Gilbert quietly informs Bertha that financial issues have halted construction, though the matter is resolved soon after. At Bertha's insistence, Mrs. Blane ends her relationship with Larry. Meanwhile, Ada accepts Luke Forte's marriage proposal, and Oscar sets his matrimonial sights on the wealthy Maude Beaton, rumored to be Jay Gould's illegitimate daughter. After Mrs. Astor asks Mr. Winterton to surrender his Academy of Music opera box because his wife (Turner) is considered socially unsuitable, he vows to support the Met and take as many friends as possible with him. At a grand dinner for the Duke of Buckingham, Bertha swaps dining table name cards to seat herself next to him, bumping Mrs. Winterton. The duke accepts Bertha's invitation to stay at their Newport house, infuriating Mrs. Winterton who had invited him. In Tuskegee, Peggy and Fortune stay with Booker T. Washington and his wife. George and other business owners conspire to subvert impending labor strikes.
14	5	"Close Enough to Touch"	Michael Engler	Julian Fellowes & Sonja Warfield	November 26, 2023	0.510
Two devious servants attempt to sabotage the Russells' lavish dinner party for the Duke of Buckingham; Watson's and Church's quick actions avert a disaster. The dinner's success vexes Mrs. Winterton, who orchestrated the scheme to ruin it. Marian and Oscar are happy about Ada's engagement to Rev. Forte, but Agnes strongly opposes it. When Agnes admits to Forte how much she depends on Ada and fears being alone, he promises she will always be in their lives. Oscar meets businessman Mr. Crowther, whose group is buying out the Chicago-Atlantic Railroad, which Miss Beaton is invested in. Oscar decides to also invest. At a Tuskegee restaurant, two White men threaten Black diners. After Fortune pushes back, he and Peggy flee. While hiding in a barn, they share a romantic kiss. George sends Larry to a trustees' meeting regarding the Brooklyn Bridge's unveiling. Larry discovers that chief engineer Washington Roebling's wife Emily has been heading the project during her husband's illness. Agnes relents and attends Forte and Ada's wedding.
15	6	"Warning Shots"	Crystle Roberson	Julian Fellowes	December 3, 2023	0.593
Mrs. Winterton demands Bertha's center opera box in exchange for supporting the Met. Bannister writes to the Russells after observing an inebriated Church, but after learning Church was despondent on the 30th anniversary of his wife's death in a smallpox epidemic, he retrieves the unopened letter and ends their feud. Bannister, some staff, Marian, and Agnes donate money for Jack's alarm clock patent application. However, the patent is declined because Jack lacks membership in any clockmakers' society or guild. Declining a quick profit, Oscar invests more money into Mr. Crowther's railroad company. Peggy asks Fortune to investigate the New York Education Board closing the Black schools. George, who secretly financed the Met's completion, forces Mr. Gilbert to give Bertha the center box, usurping Mrs. Winterton's place. Bertha hopes to score a social coup by hosting the Duke in her box at the Met opening. Dashiell stuns Marian into accepting his surprise public marriage proposal. Shortly after Forte and Ada's honeymoon, Forte is diagnosed with cancer. George is prepared to use violence against striking steelworkers to install scabs, but at the last minute, he orders soldiers to stand down and agrees to negotiate.
16	7	"Wonders Never Cease"	Michael Engler	Julian Fellowes & Sonja Warfield	December 10, 2023	0.584
After giving labor concessions, George schemes to break the steelworkers' union. Mrs. Astor offers Bertha an Academy of Music opera box. George, suspecting Mrs. Astor wants to undermine Bertha's growing influence, encourages his wife to remain with the Met. To keep the Black schools open, the administrators consider partnering with Irish teachers to attract poor white students. At the Brooklyn Bridge reception, Larry praises Mrs. Roebling's leadership. Agnes plans Marian's wedding, while Luke's health worsens. Oscar intends to propose to Miss Beaton, only to discover that she, Mr. Crowther, and his investment have disappeared. Watson's daughter Flora tells him that she never wanted him to leave New York. He will receive a pension and join her family. Bannister helps Jack obtain entry into a watchmakers' guild, allowing his alarm clock patent application to be approved. Shortly before Luke dies, Agnes thanks him for making Ada happy and giving her a new purpose and identity. Oscar tells Agnes he has lost nearly all the van Rhijn money.
17	8	"In Terms of Winning and Losing"	Michael Engler	Julian Fellowes	December 17, 2023	0.686
In October 1883, as the two opera houses' simultaneous opening nights approach, patrons must choose which to support. When Mrs. Astor poaches the Duke as her Academy of Music guest, Bertha schemes to win him back. Following Oscar's financial disaster, Ada, Agnes, and Marian prepare to sell the house and move. Marian ends her engagement to Dashiell, citing their differences. The New York Educational Board is thwarted in its secret attempt to close all Black schools. After Jack's clock patent is approved, Larry proposes a partnership. Marian attends the Met opening with the Russells, annoying Agnes, who is attending the Academy of Music. Watson is leaving the Russell household, and Peggy quits her job at The Globe to avoid further personal complications with the married Mr. Fortune. At the Met, Mrs. Winterton is outraged that the center box has gone to Bertha, which was arranged by George. The Duke arrives as Bertha's guest. It is implied she enticed the financially strapped Duke by promising marriage to Gladys, with a lucrative dowry. Most patrons choose the Met, cementing Bertha's triumph. Mrs. Bruce and Chef Borden also attend the opening, thanks to Bertha's generosity. After the opera, Larry escorts Marian to her door where they share a romantic kiss. Ada discovers that Luke was secretly wealthy, allowing the family to keep the house and altering Ada's and Agnes's relationship.

=== Season 3 (2025) ===
No. overall	No. in season	Title	Directed by	Written by	Original release date	U.S. viewers (millions)
18	1	"Who Is in Charge Here?"	Michael Engler	Julian Fellowes & Sonja Warfield	June 22, 2025 (Note: This episode was first shown at the Tribeca Festival on June 12, 2025.)	0.430
In 1884, out west, George wants to expand his railroad over land owned by copper mining companies. An urgent telegram summons him back to New York. Ada and Agnes clash over their shifting positions while the servants are unsure who runs the household. Gladys and Billy Carlton become secretly engaged. Meanwhile, Bertha anticipates Hector, Duke of Buckingham's visit, and commissions John Singer Sargent to paint Gladys' portrait. Marian thinks it too soon after ending her and Dashiel's engagement to be seen with Larry. The Christian Recorder is publishing excerpts from Peggy's novel. Ada refuses to give Oscar an allowance, urging him to find work, while Marian accepts a new teaching position at Hunter College High School. Larry excludes Jack from the clock investor meetings but struggles to understand the technology. After Jack meets with Larry at the Russell house, Adelheid thinks Jack is acting above his station. Aurora Fane is blindsided by Charles wanting a divorce. When a white doctor refuses to treat an ill Peggy, Agnes sends for the Scotts. After discovering Gladys and Billy's liaison, Bertha belittles Billy's prospects and insists Gladys marry the duke. Upset, Gladys packs a bag and flees during the night.
19	2	"What the Papers Say"	Deborah Kampmeier	Julian Fellowes & Sonja Warfield	June 29, 2025	N/A
Bertha fetches Gladys from the Carlton home. Bertha warns Mrs. Carlton that George will sabotage Billy's career and disinherit Gladys should they marry. The Scotts bring Dr. William Kirkland, a black physician, to treat Peggy. After averting a bank disaster, George reveals his railroad ambitions to JP Morgan, who considers it risky. George tries to remain neutral amid Bertha and Gladys' conflict. Meanwhile, Bertha has leaked news about Gladys and the duke to the press. Borden's estranged wife has died. Ada supports the temperance movement and asks the servants to sign a no-alcohol pledge. When Bannister requests clarification regarding who heads the household, Aurora determines it should be Ada. Larry now wants Jack at the investor meetings. Larry privately tells Marian he loves her. Aurora refuses to divorce Charles, who blatantly appears at Aurora's benefit with his mistress, Mrs. Lipton. He warns that they will be seen everywhere together. John Adams offers Oscar an investment opportunity to help revive his career. Billy, intimidated by both George and Bertha, ends his and Gladys' relationship. The duke arrives at the Russells, accompanied by Mr. Dobbs, his lawyer. The Scotts urge Peggy to speak at a Newport women's group.
20	3	"Love Is Never Easy"	Michael Engler	Julian Fellowes & Sonja Warfield	July 6, 2025	0.535
After the duke rejects George's dowry proposal, he offers an additional stipend payable only to Gladys. Hector refuses and leaves. Marian worries about her reputation after Bertha's maid sees her and Larry kissing. In Newport, Peggy and the Scotts meet Dr. Kirkland's affluent family. The snobbish Mrs. Kirkland considers Mr. Scott, a prosperous pharmacist, socially inferior for being an emancipated slave. Larry and Jack have another unsuccessful investor meeting, though Jack grows more confident. Meanwhile, Oscar acquires two more business clients. Agnes resents Ada usurping her various charity roles, while Ada feels the servants defer to Agnes. After seeing Hector at the opera with heiress Miss Delancey, Bertha presses the duke to reconsider George's offer, saying he can eventually control Gladys's allowance. Gladys, learning that Billy has moved on, reluctantly agrees to marry Hector. When only Armstrong signs the sobriety pledge, Ada feels her mission to honor Luke's legacy has failed. Mrs. Bauer assures Ada otherwise, then suggests a way Ada might "speak" to Luke.
21	4	"Marriage Is a Gamble"	Michael Engler	Julian Fellowes & Sonja Warfield	July 13, 2025	0.520
As the wedding nears, Gladys remains sequestered in her bedroom, unsure if she will marry the duke. Larry invites his maternal aunt, Monica O'Brien, to the wedding, although Bertha considers her ill-suited to New York society. Hector's snobbish sister, Lady Sarah, arrives from England. At Larry's urging, Bertha recruits Marian to replace a sick bridesmaid. Agnes is outraged when Ada consults Madame Dashkova, a clairvoyant. Jack and Larry sell the clock patent for US$600,000 (equivalent to $21.5 million in 2025). Jack keeps his newfound wealth secret while contemplating the future, but confide to Mrs. Bauer that his share is US$300,000 (equivalent to $10.75 million in 2025), making him almost as wealthy as his employer. Mrs. Astor is furious that her married daughter, Charlotte, is tied to a scandal reported in the newspapers. Upon hearing that Monica resides in Albany, Mrs. Winterton nearly reveals unknown information about herself. She also indicates that Mr. Winterton is seriously ill. Borden proposes to Mrs. Bruce, who reveals she is married to a man who has been institutionalized for years. In Newport, Mrs. Kirkland continues denigrating Mr. Scott's background. Gladys reluctantly marries Hector, and they immediately set sail for England.
22	5	"A Different World"	Deborah Kampmeier	Julian Fellowes & Sonja Warfield	July 20, 2025	0.605
Gladys struggles being a duchess amid Lady Sarah's bullying and Hector's passivity. Mr. Fortune offers Peggy an assignment in Philadelphia to interview suffragist Frances Watkins Harper. Bertha wants Church to uncover who is leaking family secrets to the press. George fires Mr. Clay for failing to acquire the railroad land, while Clay warns that George's finances are shaky. George unsuccessfully attempts to buy the Merrick family's majority shares in the Illinois Central Line, which is crucial to his transcontinental railroad expansion. Larry, heading to Arizona to procure the land for George, believes the accompanying copper mines may be valuable. Larry and Marian become engaged, disappointing Bertha. As the van Rhijn household learn about Jack's fortune, Larry takes him to the Haymarket, a risque private club. Larry sees Maud Beaton, now called "Dolly Trent", working as a prostitute there. After Lady Sarah fires Adelheid, an unhappy Gladys telegraphs her family. Larry tells Oscar about Maud Beaton. As Peggy is leaving for Philadelphia, Fortune appears at the train station, intending to accompany her. When Peggy objects, Dr. Kirkland intervenes on her behalf. Ada secretly visits Madame Dashkova. In Newport, Mrs. Fish chastises Mrs. Astor for unfairly snubbing Aurora despite her own daughter's scandal. After Gladys' telegram, George is furious at Bertha, who promises to repair the damage.
23	6	"If You Want to Cook an Omelette"	Deborah Kampmeier	Julian Fellowes & Sonja Warfield	July 27, 2025	0.602
Bertha arrives at Sidmouth Castle, Hector's English manor. J.P. Morgan summons George, the Merrick brothers, Risley Sage, and Sage's new partner, Mr. Clay, to his estate. Morgan says the Illinois Central Line expansion cannot proceed unless a majority shareholder takes charge. Oscar confronts Maud Beaton, who claims Crowther cheated her. After learning Larry was at the Haymarket, and, believing it is a brothel, Marion ends their engagement via a letter. The Merricks agree to sell George their railroad shares but renege after Clay plants damaging news stories about George's finances. George refuses to sell Sage his railroad shares to raise capital. In Arizona, a metallurgist informs Larry there are undetected copper veins worth millions. Ada realizes Madam Dashkova is a fraud. Peggy and Mrs. Kirkland attend a tea for noted suffragist Frances Watkins Harper. Jack resigns after Ada says his wealth requires that he make a new life. Jack leaves each household member a generous cash gift. A forgiving Oscar helps Miss Beaton restart her life. Mrs. Bruce suspects Bertha's maid, André, is leaking information about the Russells to the press. Bertha helps Gladys assert herself over the domineering Lady Sarah and urges Hector to support Gladys as duchess. John Adams promises more investors for Oscar, moments before being fatally struck by a carriage.
24	7	"Ex-Communicated"	Salli Richardson Whitfield	Julian Fellowes & Sonja Warfield	August 3, 2025	0.672
Ward McAllister's "tell-all" book about New York's elite gets him banned from their society. Church, Borden, and Mrs. Bruce expose André as the household spy, forcing her resignation. A grieving Oscar inherits John Adams' summer house and some money. Marian comforts Oscar and expresses understanding about him. Ada sponsors the suffrage meeting after the venue changes. During the meeting, Mrs. Foster of the New York Heritage Society approaches Agnes, seemingly for a purpose. Marian refuses to see Larry, who blames Bertha for their break-up. The lucrative copper mines give George financial leverage to realign with J.P. Morgan and buy the Merricks' railroad shares, thwarting Risley Sage and ousting Clay. Amid her daughter Charlotte's marriage scandal, Mrs. Astor asks Bertha to host the annual Newport ball. Marian helps Jack find a house on 61st Street. He tells her that Larry did nothing wrong at the Haymarket, though Marian is skeptical. As Hector and Gladys prepare to visit New York, Hector encourages Lady Sarah to move to London. Mrs. Kirkland learns about Peggy's past then tells William. A man arrives at George's office and shoots a clerk before firing at George.
25	8	"My Mind Is Made Up"	Salli Richardson Whitfield	Julian Fellowes & Sonja Warfield	August 10, 2025	0.954
George, seriously wounded, is rushed to the Russell house. Dr. Kirkland, who is at the Van Rhijns to see Peggy, saves George's life. Marian comforts Larry and apologizes for doubting him, though Larry is unforgiving. To avoid publicity and police involvement, private detectives are hired to investigate the shooting. Mrs. Astor refuses to attend the ball if divorcees attend, including her daughter. Dr. Kirkland believes Peggy's history may be insurmountable, leaving her heartbroken. Mrs. Scott confronts Mrs. Kirkland for unfairly maligning Peggy. With his father's urging, Dr. Kirkland proposes to Peggy. Mrs. Foster asks Agnes to be the Heritage Society's vice president, while Agnes acknowledges that Ada now heads the household. Bridget visits Jack at his new house. At the ball, Oscar proposes a marriage of convenience to the recently widowed Enid Winterton. Larry and Marian reconcile. George recovers enough to appear at the ball, as do Hector and Gladys, as well as Mrs. Astor. George refuses to reconcile with Bertha and chastises her manipulating their children for personal ambition but also blames himself. He and Larry return to New York. Gladys, now pregnant, is reunited with former maid Adelheid.

=== Season 4 (2026) ===
No. overall	No. in season	Title	Directed by	Written by	Original release date	U.S. viewers (millions)
26	1	"Ring the Bells"	Salli Richardson Whitfield	Julian Fellowes & Sonja Warfield	November 1, 2026	TBD
In 1885, after Oscar and Enid's wedding reception, the newlyweds and Marian celebrate at a downtown dance hall. Larry and Marian, who ended their relationship, dance together. Larry is escorting Marian home when the carriage breaks down during a severe storm that paralyzes most public transportation. They shelter at a nearby hotel. Their passion rekindled, they are intimate, but Marian is distraught and ashamed the next morning. At Sidmouth Castle, Gladys delivers a healthy boy, but a harrowing labor caused hemorrhaging, necessitating a lifesaving hysterectomy. Hector delays telling Gladys she is unable to have more children. Peggy, now a published novelist, and Mrs. Scott deflect Mrs. Kirkland's constant meddling. Agnes prepares to host a dinner for President Grover Cleveland on behalf of the Heritage Society, but Ada limits the budget, particularly after Peggy mentions Cleveland's unpopularity among the Black community. Although outraged upon leaning Enid was Bertha's maid, Agnes grudgingly accepts Enid's offer to contribute to her charities. Enid and Oscar want to influence society through social gatherings with prominent artists and intellectuals. Jack meets with businessmen about his new food mixer but is discomfited by his less refined manners and education. The Van Rhijn-Forte staff tutor Jack in proper etiquette, though Bridget worries it pushes him further away. Meanwhile, George remains unforgiving toward Bertha and is feuding with John D. Rockefeller over railroad transportation fees. Pinkerton detectives uncover information regarding George's assassination attempt.
27	2	"You Won't Hear Me Beg"	Anya Adams	Julian Fellowes & Davita Scarlett	November 8, 2026	TBD
Pinkerton detectives apprehend Will Morris, George's would-be assassin. Will's deceased father was alderman Patrick Morris, who George bankrupted. George chastises Larry for speaking up during contentious negotiations with Rockefeller. Agnes and Ada clash over spending and changing styles. Ada hires awkward Oliver as footman, whom Agnes and Bannister deem unqualified. The Ladies Home Journal interviews Agnes to feature the Heritage Society. In Newport, Mrs. Kirkland introduces Peggy as a widow to her Daughters of Friendship club, offending Peggy and Mrs. Scott. Dr. Kirkland is distressed after being denied doctor privileges at Bellevue Hospital where his patient was admitted and later died. Bertha and George reunite, though George, still taking laudanum and acting erratically, refuses to return home. Mrs. Astor fuels gossip about the Russells' marital disharmony but promotes Larry as a match for daughter Carrie. Enid gloats to Bertha about Agnes hosting President Cleveland. Meanwhile, Larry considers investing in American productions of Gilbert and Sullivan musicals. Oscar and Enid plan their salons. Marian rebuffs Larry's reconciliation attempts and volunteers long hours at a settlement house in New York's poor Lower East Side. After Mrs. Morris's desperate plea, Bertha appeals to George, who spares Will's life but banishes the Morrises from New York. Late at night, a deeply conflicted George returns home.
28	3	"Ain't That Good News"	Salli Richardson Whitfield	Julian Fellowes & Sonja Warfield	November 15, 2026	TBD
Dr. Kirkland surprises Peggy with a Newport summer house. Meanwhile, Mrs. Kirkland causes conflict between the Scott and the Kirkland families by opposing Black slave traditions that she considers undignified being included in the wedding ceremony. On the wedding eve, Peggy attempts to make peace with Mrs. Kirkland. At the wedding, Marian, Ada, and Agnes are introduced to Dr. Harris, Dr. Kirkland's former professor. Marian gives Peggy her old Doylestown train ticket as a memento of their first meeting. George has returned home but remains aloof. Concerned over George's declining condition, Bertha insists on Dr. Logan checking him. Dr. Logan warns George about laudanum, a highly addictive drug, that George denies he still takes. Jack and Larry attend Enid and Oscar's first salon, where Jack meets Fiona Summers, Carrie Astor's flirtatious young cousin, while Oscar is attracted to Lee Klein, an upcoming artist. After the Ladies' Home Journal's unflattering article about Agnes, Bertha persuades Mrs. Foster and the White House to move the presidential dinner to her home, intending to invite J.D. Rockefeller and include Hector and Gladys to gain business leverage for George. Bertha also contributes to Mrs. Rockefeller's charitable causes. Agnes, infuriated the dinner location was moved without her knowledge, confronts Bertha.
29	4	"Good Taste"	TBA	Julian Fellowes & Sonja Warfield	November 22, 2026	TBD
30	5	"Dinner Is Served"	TBA	Julian Fellowes & Sonja Warfield	November 29, 2026	TBD
31	6	"The Talk of the Town"	TBA	Julian Fellowes & Sonja Warfield	December 6, 2026	TBD
32	7	"Vive la Révolution!"	TBA	Julian Fellowes & Sonja Warfield	December 13, 2026	TBD
33	8	TBA	TBA	Julian Fellowes & Sonja Warfield	December 20, 2026	TBD

== Production ==
=== Development ===
In September 2012, The Daily Telegraph reported Julian Fellowes as saying that he was working on a spin-off prequel of Downton Abbey. Initially conceived as a book, it was then planned for pick-up by ITV. At the time, Fellowes planned to focus the show around Lord Grantham and Cora's romance and eventual marriage as the Earl and Countess of Grantham.

Production and writing for The Gilded Age was updated in January 2016. Asked whether he'd written the script yet, Fellowes said, 'No I haven't, no. I'm doing that this year', before adding: 'And then hopefully shooting at the end of the year.'"

On June 4, 2016, Fellowes was asked by the Los Angeles Times, "Where does The Gilded Age stand?" Fellowes replied, "It stands really with me up to my neck in research, and I'm clearing the decks, so that when I start Gilded Age, I'm only doing Gilded Age. These people were extraordinary. You can see why they frightened the old guard, because they saw no boundaries. They wanted to build a palace, they built a palace. They wanted to buy a yacht, they bought a yacht. And the old guard in New York weren't like that at all, and suddenly this whirlwind of couture descended on their heads. They redesigned being rich. They created a rich culture that we still have—people who are rich are rich in a way that was established in America in the 1880s, '90s, 1900s. It was different from Europe. Something like Newport would never have happened in any other country, where you have huge palaces, and then about 20 yards away, another huge palace, and 20 yards beyond that another huge palace. In England right up to the 1930s, when people made good money, they would buy an estate of 5,000 acres and they'd have to look after Nanny. The Americans of the 1880s and '90s didn't want too much of that."

The final confirmation the show would be produced was announced by NBC in January 2018. NBC originally announced that the show would consist of ten episodes and premiere in 2019. About the show, Fellowes stated: "To write The Gilded Age is the fulfillment of a personal dream, I have been fascinated by this period of American history for many years and now NBC has given me the chance to bring it to a modern audience. I could not be more excited and thrilled. The truth is, America is a wonderful country with a rich and varied history, and nothing could give me more pleasure than be the person to bring that compelling history to the screen."

In May 2019, the series moved from NBC to HBO, with a straight to series order. The series premiered on January 24, 2022, and consists of nine episodes.

On February 14, 2022, HBO renewed the series for a second season. On December 21, 2023, HBO renewed the series for a third season. On July 28, 2025, HBO renewed the series for a fourth season.

=== Casting ===
In September 2019, the production announced an initial cast consisting of Christine Baranski, Cynthia Nixon, Amanda Peet, and Morgan Spector.

In November 2019, it was announced that Denée Benton, Louisa Jacobson, Taissa Farmiga, Blake Ritson, and Simon Jones would be joining the show. In January 2020, Harry Richardson, Thomas Cocquerel, and Jack Gilpin were cast as series regulars, with Jeanne Tripplehorn cast in a recurring role.

In April 2020, Carrie Coon was cast as Bertha Russell to replace Peet because of delays caused by the COVID-19 pandemic. This caused the costuming team to change their approach, using the way Coon presents herself as inspiration for more metallic-colored dresses intended to evoke the burgeoning machine age.

In January 2021, Nathan Lane joined the cast in a recurring role. In April 2022, it was announced several members of the recurring cast had been upgraded to series regular status for the second season while Cocquerel will exit the series.

In August 2024, Bill Camp, Merritt Wever, Leslie Uggams, LisaGay Hamilton, Jessica Frances Dukes, Andrea Martin, Hattie Morahan and Paul Alexander Nolan were cast to join the third season. In November 2024, Dylan Baker, Kate Baldwin, Michael Cumpsty, John Ellison Conlee, Bobby Steggert, and Hannah Shealy were cast to join the third season. In February 2026, Jordan Donica was promoted from his recurring role in season three to series regular status for season four. James Scully and Bonnie Milligan also joined the cast.

=== Filming ===
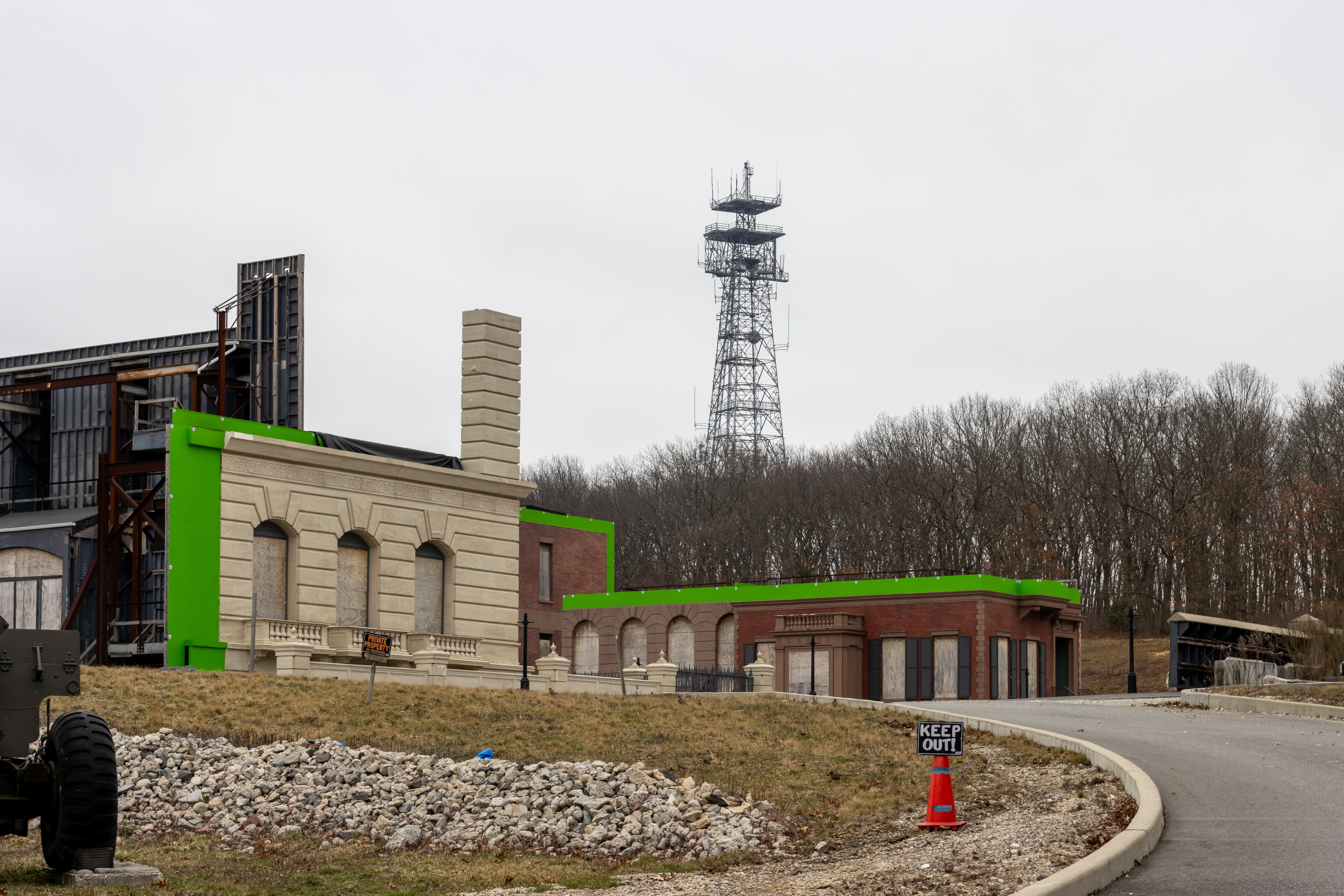
Backlot at Old Bethpage, New York

Following the move to HBO, the series was expected to begin filming in March 2020, before the COVID-19 pandemic delayed production.

Filming of the series began in Newport, Rhode Island in February 2021, at the mansions Chateau-sur-Mer, The Elms, and The Breakers. A casting call for Rhode Islanders to work as extras on the series was made in December 2020 prior to the production setting up in the city.

In April 2021, filming continued at the Lyndhurst mansion in Tarrytown, New York and the Hudson River Museum in Yonkers, New York. In May 2021, filming continued in Troy, New York in its Central Troy Historic District, where multiple city blocks were transformed to resemble a Victorian-era street.

During filming, a horse died on set and People for the Ethical Treatment of Animals asked for an investigation. HBO subsequently issued a statement confirming the death in late June, saying, "a horse collapsed and died, likely of natural causes, according to a veterinarian's preliminary findings."

Filming for season two began in August 2022 at various locations around White Plains, New York, including Manhattanville College's Reid Hall, which was used for various locations, including offices, a home parlor and an art gallery/museum. Reid Hall was designed by Stanford White and built in 1892 for the family of newspaper publisher and diplomat, Whitelaw Reid.

Other New York locations included Albany, New York; Cohoes, New York; Troy, New York; Long Island; and Philadelphia. Scenes set at Susan Blane's home were filmed at Kingscote in Newport. The street backlot is near to Old Bethpage, New York on Long Island.

The third season started filming in July 2024. Season 4 wrapped up shooting in early August, 2026.

=== Legal issue ===
On May 21, 2021, the American Federation of Musicians of the United States and Canada (AFM) filed a charge for unfair labor practices against HBO and its Gilded Age production. The union claimed musicians were fired after asking they be represented by AFM. Two days later HBO agreed to cover the members "on an AFM basis".

=== Real-life events ===
Although The Gilded Age is a work of fiction, Julian Fellowes worked to accurately represent certain realities of the time period.

Caroline Schermerhorn Astor, also known as "The" Mrs. Astor, ruled New York society in the late nineteenth century. Descended from Dutch settlers, Astor married William Backhouse Astor Jr, whose family wealth was relatively new. At the time the series took place, Astor (Donna Murphy) and her husband were largely estranged. Dismayed by the chaos caused by the end of the Civil War and the rise of new money, and armed with her own distinguished lineage and her husband's fortune, she became the gatekeeper to high society.

Two characters, Bertha and George Russell (Carrie Coon and Morgan Spector), appear to be at least partly based on the formidable Alva and William K. Vanderbilt. Alva Erskine Vanderbilt (later Alva Belmont) came from a wealthy Mobile, Alabama, family that lost its money after the Civil War. Determined to regain her social status, she married a scion of the immensely wealthy Vanderbilt family in 1875, but the Vanderbilts were considered too "new money" by Caroline Astor and were largely ignored. In order to ascend to the upper echelons of society, Alva Vanderbilt set out to impress Caroline Astor. She hired society architect Richard Morris Hunt to build a luxurious mansion on Fifth Avenue and then hosted an enormous, extravagant ball for 1,000 as a "house-warming". The details of the festivities were leaked in advance to the press, and young society waited breathlessly for the upcoming ball—including Caroline Astor's daughter, Carrie. Caroline Astor called on Alva Vanderbilt to ensure that her daughter received an invitation. The ball was a success and the family was accepted into New York high society.

Other historical figures who appear in the series include President Chester A. Arthur (Randall Passman); Clara Barton (Linda Emond), founder of the American Red Cross; John Singer Sargent; and T. Thomas Fortune (Sullivan Jones), a man born into slavery who would become one of the leading Black journalists of his day. In his editorials, he wrote passionately about civil rights and denounced racial segregation and discrimination. He also helped found a predecessor to the NAACP, the Afro-American League.

== Release ==
The series premiered on January 24, 2022, on HBO and HBO Max. In Australia, Paramount+ acquired the series as a "Paramount+ Exclusive", premiering on January 26, 2022. This also marks the first time a recent HBO series has skipped Foxtel in Australia, premiering on a non-Foxtel service as Foxtel has an output deal for HBO shows.

=== Home media ===
The first season was released on DVD, on July 26, 2022.

== Reception ==
=== Critical response ===
==== Season 1 ====
On the review aggregator Rotten Tomatoes, the first season of The Gilded Age holds an approval rating of 79% based on 76 reviews, with an average rating of 7/10. The site's critical consensus reads: "Julian Fellowes' brand of upstairs, downstairs intrigue makes a seamless transatlantic transition in The Gilded Age, with an outstanding cast making the travails of the rich a compelling watch." Metacritic assigned the season a score of 68 out of 100, based on 38 critics, indicating "generally favorable" reviews.

Linda Holmes of NPR praised the series as "sharp and well-cast", noting that while it shares similarities with Downton Abbey, it distinguishes itself by focusing on the dynamics between old and new money in 1882 New York City. Conversely, Lucy Mangan of The Guardian criticized the show, describing it as "sheer agony" and questioning the quality of its dialogue and character development.

==== Season 2 ====
The second season received a higher approval rating on Rotten Tomatoes, standing at 94% based on 42 reviews, with an average rating of 7.75/10. The site's critical consensus states: "More topical than before while also owning its frivolous appeal with unapologetic splendor, Julian Fellowes' operatic soap enters its own halcyon age." On Metacritic, the season has a score of 73 out of 100, based on 21 reviews, indicating "generally favorable" reviews.

Kaiya Shunyata of RogerEbert.com commended the season for allowing its sprawling cast to shine, particularly highlighting Carrie Coon's performance as Bertha Russell. Kristen Baldwin of Entertainment Weekly described the season as "opulent, over-the-top escapism", appreciating its lavish production and melodramatic storytelling. However, Chitra Ramaswamy of The Guardian offered a more critical view, noting that while the show is visually impressive, it lacks the sharpness and wit expected from such a period drama.

==== Season 3 ====
For the third season, Rotten Tomatoes reported a 96% approval rating based on 46 reviews, with an average rating of 7.8/10. The site's critical consensus is: "Providing its gleaming ensemble with some of their juiciest material yet, The Gilded Age's tongue is still firmly in cheek but finds itself with plenty new to say." Metacritic assigned the season a score of 74 out of 100, based on 18 critics, indicating "generally favorable" reviews.

==== Season 4 ====
For the fourth season, Rotten Tomatoes reported a 95% approval rating based on 33 reviews, with an average rating of 8.05/10. The site's critical consensus is: "An ensemble piece that thrives on its sumptuous performances, The Gilded Age's fourth season still manages to reach new dramatic highs while keeping its audience thoroughly enthralled." Metacritic assigned the season a score of 74 out of 100, based on 12 critics, indicating "generally favorable" reviews.

=== Accolades ===
Year	Award	Category	Nominee(s)	Result	Ref.
2022	Set Decorators Society of America Awards	Best Achievement in Décor/Design of a One Hour Period Series	Regina Graves and Bob Shaw	Nominated	
2022	Black Reel Awards	Outstanding Supporting Actress, Drama Series	Audra McDonald	Nominated	
2022	HCA TV Awards	Best Cable Series, Drama	The Gilded Age	Nominated	
2022	HCA TV Awards	Best Writing in a Broadcast Network or Cable Series, Drama	Julian Fellowes (for "Face the Music")	Nominated	
2022	Dorian Awards	Most Visually Striking TV Show	The Gilded Age	Nominated	
2022	AAFCA TV Honors	Best TV Directing	Salli Richardson-Whitfield	Won	
2022	Primetime Creative Arts Emmy Awards	Outstanding Production Design for a Narrative Period or Fantasy Program (One Hour or More)	Bob Shaw, Larry Brown, Laura Ballinger, and Regina Graves (for "Never the New")	Won	
2023	ADG Excellence in Production Design Awards	Excellence in Production Design for a One-Hour Period Single-Camera Series	Bob Shaw, Laura Ballinger, Larry Brown, Regina Graves, Ryan Heck, Aimee Dombo, Ann Bartek, Michael Auszura, Tom Gleeson, Maki Takenouchi, Deborah Wheatley, Matthew J. Sama, Hugh Sicotte, Holly Watson, Dan-ah Kim, Jeremy Wong, Jannick Guillou, Patricia Sprott, Jason Marzano, and Dana Kenn (for "Never the New")	Nominated	
2023	Costume Designers Guild Awards	Excellence in Period Television	Kasia Walicka-Maimone (for "Let the Tournament Begin")	Nominated	
2023	Satellite Awards	Best Actress in a Drama or Genre Series	Carrie Coon	Nominated	
2023	Satellite Awards	Best Actress in a Supporting Role in a Series, Miniseries, Limited Series, or Motion Picture Made for Television	Cynthia Nixon	Nominated	
2023	Artios Awards	Outstanding Achievement in Casting for a Television Pilot and First Season – Drama	Bernard Telsey, Adam Caldwell, and Kristian Charbonier	Nominated	
2023	Croatian Cinematographers Society Awards	Best Cinematography in a TV Series	Vanja Černjul	Won	
2023	Hollywood Music in Media Awards	Best Original Score – TV Show/Limited Series	Harry Gregson-Williams and Rupert Gregson-Williams	Nominated	
2024	ADG Excellence in Production Design Awards	Excellence in Production Design for a One-Hour Period Single-Camera Series	Bob Shaw, Larry Brown, Scott Davis, Libby Stadstad, Angelica Borrero-Fortier, C. J. Simpson, Loren Kane, Juli Sasaki, Alexandra Miklos, Pat Sprott, Jason Marzano, Caitlin Conlow, I. Javier Ameijeiras, and Lisa Crivelli Scoppa (for "His Grace the Duke", "Close Enough to Touch", and "Warning Shots")	Nominated	
2024	Make-Up Artists & Hair Stylists Guild Awards	Best Period and/or Character Hair Styling	Sean Flanigan, Christine Fennell-Harlan, Jonathan Sharpless, and Aaron Kinchen	Nominated	
2024	Costume Designers Guild Awards	Excellence in Period Television	Kasia Walicka-Maimone and Patrick Wiley (for "You Don't Even Like Opera")	Nominated	
2024	Screen Actors Guild Awards	Outstanding Performance by an Ensemble in a Drama Series	Ben Ahlers, Ashlie Atkinson, Christine Baranski, Denée Benton, Nicole Brydon Bloom, Michael Cerveris, Carrie Coon, Kelley Curran, Taissa Farmiga, David Furr, Jack Gilpin, Ward Horton, Louisa Jacobson, Simon Jones, Sullivan Jones, Celia Keenan-Bolger, Nathan Lane, Matilda Lawler, Robert Sean Leonard, Audra McDonald, Debra Monk, Donna Murphy, Kristine Nielsen, Cynthia Nixon, Kelli O'Hara, Patrick Page, Harry Richardson, Taylor Richardson, Blake Ritson, Jeremy Shamos, Douglas Sills, Morgan Spector, John Douglas Thompson, and Erin Wilhelmi	Nominated	
2024	Queerty Awards	TV Drama	The Gilded Age	Nominated	
2024	Set Decorators Society of America Awards	Best Achievement in Décor/Design of a One Hour Period Series	Lisa Crivelli Scoppa and Bob Shaw	Nominated	
2024	Dorian Awards	Best TV Drama	The Gilded Age	Nominated	
2024	Dorian Awards	Best Supporting TV Performance – Drama	Christine Baranski	Nominated	
2024	Black Reel Awards	Outstanding Supporting Performance in a Drama Series	Audra McDonald	Nominated	
2024	Black Reel Awards	Outstanding Writing in a Drama Series	Julian Fellowes and Sonja Warfield (for "Close Enough to Touch")	Nominated	
2024	Black Reel Awards	Outstanding Guest Performance in a Drama Series	Michael Braugher	Nominated	
2024	Location Managers Guild International Awards	Outstanding Locations in Period Television	Lauri Pitkus and Alex Berard	Nominated	
2024	Astra TV Awards	Best Cable Drama Series	The Gilded Age	Nominated	
2024	Astra TV Awards	Best Actor in a Broadcast Network or Cable Drama Series	Morgan Spector	Nominated	
2024	Astra TV Awards	Best Actress in a Broadcast Network or Cable Drama Series	Carrie Coon	Nominated	
2024	Astra TV Awards	Best Supporting Actor in a Broadcast Network or Cable Drama Series	Nathan Lane	Nominated	
2024	Astra TV Awards	Best Supporting Actress in a Broadcast Network or Cable Drama Series	Christine Baranski	Won	
2024	Astra TV Awards	Best Supporting Actress in a Broadcast Network or Cable Drama Series	Audra McDonald	Nominated	
2024	Astra TV Awards	Best Directing in a Broadcast Network or Cable Drama Series	Michael Engler (for "In Terms of Winning and Losing")	Nominated	
2024	Astra TV Awards	Best Writing in a Broadcast Network or Cable Drama Series	Julian Fellowes (for "In Terms of Winning and Losing")	Nominated	
2024	Astra TV Awards	Best Guest Actor in a Drama Series	Michael Braugher	Nominated	
2024	Primetime Creative Arts Emmy Awards	Outstanding Production Design for a Narrative Period or Fantasy Program (One Hour or More)	Bob Shaw, Larry Brown, and Lisa Crivelli Scoppa (for "Close Enough to Touch")	Nominated	
2024	Primetime Creative Arts Emmy Awards	Outstanding Period Costumes for a Series	Kasia Walicka-Maimone, Patrick Wiley, Isabelle Simone, Denise Andres, and Rebecca Levin Lore (for "You Don't Even Like Opera")	Nominated	
2024	Primetime Creative Arts Emmy Awards	Outstanding Period or Fantasy/Sci-Fi Hairstyling	Sean Flanigan, Christine Fennell-Harlan, Jonathan Sharpless, Aaron Kinchen, Tim Harvey, and Jennifer M. Bullock (for "You Don't Even Like Opera")	Nominated	
2024	Primetime Emmy Awards	Outstanding Drama Series	The Gilded Age (Note: Nominees: Julian Fellowes, Gareth Neame, David Crockett, Michael Engler, Sonja Warfield, Salli Richardson-Whitfield, Robert Greenblatt, Erica Armstrong Dunbar, Claire M. Shanley, and Holly Rymon)	Nominated	
2024	Primetime Emmy Awards	Outstanding Lead Actress in a Drama Series	Carrie Coon (for "Head to Head")	Nominated	
2024	Primetime Emmy Awards	Outstanding Supporting Actress in a Drama Series	Christine Baranski (for "In Terms of Winning and Losing")	Nominated	
2025	Artios Awards	Outstanding Achievement in Casting for a Television Series – Drama	Bernard Telsey, Adam Caldwell, and Amelia Rasche McCarthy	Nominated	
2025	Satellite Awards	Best Actress in a Drama or Genre Series	Carrie Coon	Nominated	
2025	Hollywood Music in Media Awards	Best Original Score – TV Show/Limited Series	Harry Gregson-Williams and Rupert Gregson-Williams	Nominated	
2025	Astra Creative Arts Awards	Best Costume Design – Television	Kasia Walicka-Maimone	Nominated	
2025	Astra Creative Arts Awards	Best Hairstyling	Sean Flanigan and Christine Fennell-Harlan	Nominated	
2026	Critics' Choice Awards	Best Actress in a Drama Series	Carrie Coon	Nominated	
2026	Critics' Choice Awards	Best Supporting Actress in a Drama Series	Denée Benton	Nominated	
2026	Costume Designers Guild Awards	Excellence in Period Television	Kasia Walicka-Maimone (for "Marriage Is a Gamble")	Nominated	
2026	ADG Excellence in Production Design Awards	Excellence in Production Design for a One-Hour Period Single-Camera Series	Bob Shaw, Larry Brown, Matthew J. Sama, Libby Stadstad, Will Fu, Loren Kane, Juli Sasaki, Hugh Sicotte, Alex Innocenti, Jason Marzano, Caitlin Conlow, Leanne Macomber, and Jennifer Alex Nickason (for "If You Want to Cook an Omelette")	Nominated	
2026	NAACP Image Awards	Outstanding Supporting Actress in a Drama Series	Audra McDonald	Nominated	
2026	NAACP Image Awards	Outstanding Directing in a Drama Series	Salli Richardson-Whitfield	Nominated	
2026	GLAAD Media Awards	Outstanding Drama Series	The Gilded Age	Nominated	
2026	Queerty Awards	TV Drama	The Gilded Age	Nominated	
2026	Astra TV Awards	Best Actress in a Drama Series	Carrie Coon	Nominated	
2026	Astra TV Awards	Best Supporting Actress in a Drama Series	Christine Baranski	Nominated	
2026	Astra TV Awards	Best Directing in a Drama Series	Salli Richardson-Whitfield (for "My Mind Is Made Up")	Nominated	
2026	Dorian Awards	Best TV Drama	The Gilded Age	Nominated	
2026	Dorian Awards	Best TV Performance – Drama	Carrie Coon	Nominated	
2026	Dorian Awards	Most Visually Striking TV Show	The Gilded Age	Nominated	
2026	Black Reel Awards	Outstanding Directing in a Drama Series	Salli Richardson-Whitfield	Nominated	
2026	Black Reel Awards	Outstanding Guest Performance in a Drama Series	Leslie Uggams	Nominated	
2026	Black Reel Awards	Outstanding Production Design	Bob Shaw	Won	
2026	TCA Awards	Outstanding Achievement in Drama	The Gilded Age	Nominated	
2026	Primetime Creative Arts Emmy Awards	Outstanding Guest Actress in a Drama Series	Merritt Wever (for "Marriage Is a Gamble")	Nominated	
2026	Primetime Creative Arts Emmy Awards	Outstanding Production Design for a Narrative Period or Fantasy Program (One Hour or More)	Bob Shaw, Larry Brown, and Jennifer Alex Nickason for ("If You Want To Cook an Omelette")	Nominated	
2026	Primetime Creative Arts Emmy Awards	Outstanding Period Costumes	Kasia Walicka-Maimone, Denise Andres, Rebecca Levin Lore, Isabelle Simone, Rebecca Freund, and Sue Bakula (for "Marriage Is a Gamble")	Nominated	
2026	Primetime Creative Arts Emmy Awards	Outstanding Period or Fantasy/Sci-Fi Hairstyling	Sean Flanigan, Christine Fennell-Harlan, Jonathan Sharpless, Tim Harvey, Aaron Kinchen, and Anika Seitu (for "My Mind Is Made Up")	Nominated	
2026	Primetime Creative Arts Emmy Awards	Outstanding Period or Fantasy/Sci-Fi Makeup (Non-Prosthetic)	Nicki Ledermann, Anette Lian-Williams, Jane DiPersio, Emily Maitland Marroquin, and Mareike Mohmand (for "My Mind Is Made Up")	Nominated	
2026	Property Masters Guild's MacGuffin Awards	One-Hour Period Television Series	Peter Gelfman	Nominated	
2026	Primetime Emmy Awards	Outstanding Drama Series	The Gilded Age (Note: Nominees: Julian Fellowes, Gareth Neame, David Crockett, Michael Engler, Sonja Warfield, Salli Richardson-Whitfield, Robert Greenblatt, Erica Armstrong Dunbar, Claire M. Shanley, Luke Harlan, and Holly Rymon)	Nominated	
2026	Primetime Emmy Awards	Outstanding Lead Actress in a Drama Series	Carrie Coon (for "My Mind Is Made Up")	Nominated	
2026	Primetime Emmy Awards	Outstanding Directing for a Drama Series	Salli Richardson-Whitfield (for "My Mind Is Made Up")	Nominated	
