= The Davenports (book series) =

Book series by Krystal Marquis

- The Davenports; The Davenports: More Than This
- Author: Krystal Marquis
- Country: United States
- Language: English
- Genre: Young adult historical fiction
- Publisher: Dial Books
- Media type: Print / Digital
- No. of books: 2
- OCLC: 1340656708
- Website: https://krystalmarquis.com/

The Davenports is a young adult historical fiction duology by American writer Krystal Marquis. The books follow four young Black women living in Chicago during the Gilded Age. Both books in the series were named to the New York Times' Best Seller list for Young Adult Hardcover fiction.

== Plot ==
The duology follows four young Black women living in Chicago in 1910: Olivia and Helen, the daughters of William Davenport, a formerly enslaved businessowner who built his wealth as the nation's first Black automaker; the girls' friend and the family's maid, Amy-Rose; and Ruby, Olivia's best friend. The four navigate love and life as they approach adulthood.

== Background ==
The first book in the The Davenports series is a debut novel for Krystal Marquis, who was raised in Terryville, Connecticut. She wrote the first draft of the book during NaNoWriMo in 2019. She was inspired to center the book on a Black family during the Gilded Age after coming across an article about C.R. Patterson, a freedmen who founded the nation's first Black-owned automobile company. Marquis wondered about Patterson's daughters and what the expectations might have been for their lives. She used online resources from the Chicago Public Library to research the city during the Gilded Age.

== Publication history ==
The Davenports was published on January 31, 2023 by Dial Books. The Davenports: More Than This was published November 4, 2025.

== Reception ==
=== The Davenports ===
The Davenports was described in a starred review by Kirkus Reviews: "This deftly written series opener examines the lives of Black elites following Reconstruction with a focus on the constraints of women." April Crowder of School Library Journal recommended the book, "this is a well-written novel, sure to please fans of historical fiction, romance, and Chicago history. Young adults and adults alike will learn from and enjoy this.” Publishers Weekly gave the book a starred review and wrote, "Employing expert characterization and complex dynamics, the author presents a cast of take-charge women, undeterred by their struggles and pursuing their passions regardless of expectations."

=== The Davenports: More Than This ===
Ashley Leffel of Booklist wrote in a positive review, "The Davenport sisters and their friends Amy-Rose and Ruby are back for more romance and intrigue. [And] the politics and high society of Black Chicago in the early 1900s are as interesting and juicy as ever." Florence Simmons and Ellen Williams recommended the book in School Library Journal, "Marquis’s novel richly portrays the complexities of early 20th-century Black society and the determination of young women redefining their futures."

== Accolades ==
- New York Times Best Seller list for Young Adult Hardcover fiction
- Kirkus Reviews Best Books of 2023
- Winner – 2023, Heartland Booksellers Award
- Winner – 2024, Black Caucus of the American Library Association Award for Debut

== Television adaptation ==
In 2024 it was announced that Sonja Warfield and Susan Fales-Hill will adapt the series for television with Alloy Entertainment and Amazon Prime Video.
