= Ben Ahlers =

American actor (born 1996)

- Born: August 17, 1996 (age 30); Fort Dodge, Iowa, U.S.
- Education: University of Michigan (BFA)
- Occupation: Actor
- Years active: 2016–present

Ben Ahlers (born August 17, 1996) is an American actor. He is known for playing Liam Kelly in the NBC drama series The Village (2019), Jack Trotter in the HBO historical drama series The Gilded Age (2022–present), and Burton in the HBO post-apocalyptic drama series The Last of Us (2025).

== Early life and career ==
Ahlers was born on August 17, 1996, in Fort Dodge, Iowa. He began singing and acting in community theatre from 6 years old, landing his first role as an orphan in a local production of Oliver!. After graduating as valedictorian from Fort Dodge Senior High School, he attended the University of Michigan, earning a Bachelor of Fine Arts in musical theatre.

In 2017, Ahlers starred in the short film Anna Garcia Does a One Woman Play. He then landed a small role on the NBC drama The Village, his first appearance on network television. In 2020, he starred in the Quibi miniseries When the Streetlights Go On, playing the main role of Brad Kirchoff. He also briefly appeared in Chilling Adventures of Sabrina playing Lucas Hunt, a love interest of the main character.

In 2022, Ahlers was cast on the HBO series The Gilded Age, playing the role of footman and clockmaker John "Jack" Trotter. Beginning as a recurring role, he was promoted to a series regular in the second season. In preparation of the show's second season, Ahlers took watch-making classes with the Horological Society of New York.

In 2025, Ahlers was cast in the second season of HBO series The Last of Us as Burton, a loyal soldier of the Seattle rebel militia group Washington Liberation Front (WLF). Introduced during a flashback as a naïve rookie serving the government, he is recruited to the WLF by Jeffrey Wright's Isaac.

In May 2025, Ahlers played the titular role in John Wilkes Booth: One Night Only!, a stage show from Mad Men screenwriter Matthew Weiner that premiered at Baltimore's Center Stage.

In a July 2025 announcement, he was cast in Little Brother, an upcoming comedy film on Netflix. That December, it was announced that he would appear in Death of a Salesman in the Broadway revival being led by Nathan Lane and Laurie Metcalf.

== Personal life ==
Ahlers grew up Catholic, but is no longer a practicing Christian.

Due to his The Gilded Age character's clock-making arc, Ahlers has been widely nicknamed "Clock Twink" by fans online, which he has embraced. Following the show, he retained an interest in clock-making, and began collecting vintage watches. He has remained involved with the Horological Society, attending their 2024 gala, and serving as co-chair of the Society's 2026 gala, alongside watchmakers Danièla Dufour (daughter of Philippe Dufour) and Roger W. Smith.

Outside of acting, Ahlers enjoys yoga and meditation; he worked as a personal trainer before his acting career became sustainable.

He is a fan of directors Sean Baker, Chloé Zhao, Sam Mendes and Yorgos Lanthimos, and says his favorite author is David Foster Wallace.

== Filmography ==
†	Denotes productions that have not yet been released.

=== Film ===
Year	Title	Role	Notes	Ref.
2017	Anna Garcia Does a One Woman Play	Ben	Short film	
2019	Walk Off	Ben Larson	Short film; also associate producer	
2023	Smago	Charles	Short film	
2024	A Wonderful Way with Dragons	Gray		
2025	12 Hours in the Life of Jason Bruckner	Jason Bruckner		
2026	Little Brother	Kieran Francis		
2026	Movin’ On Up	Graham	Short Film	

=== Television ===
Year	Title	Role	Notes	Ref.
2016–2019	The University	Kyle Clark	Episodes: "What We Know" (2016), "Measures of Protection" (2019)	
2019	The Village	Liam Kelly	7 episodes	
2019	Instinct	Boyd Carter	Episode: "Big Splash"	
2020	When the Streetlights Go On	Brad Kirchoff	Main role	
2020	Chilling Adventures of Sabrina	Lucas Hunt	Episode: "Chapter Thirty One: The Weird"	
2022–present	The Gilded Age	John "Jack" Trotter	Main role (seasons 2 and 3); recurring (season 1)	
2025	The Last of Us	Burton	2 episodes ("Day One" and "Convergence")	

=== Stage ===
Year	Production	Role	Theater	Ref.
2018	The Closet	Jack O'Reilly	Williamstown Theatre Festival	
2019	Good Boys	Brandon Hardy	Pasadena Playhouse	
2024	Tender Napalm	Man	Theaterlab, Off-Broadway	
2025	John Wilkes Booth: One Night Only!	John Wilkes Booth	Baltimore Center Stage	
2026	Death of a Salesman	Happy Loman	Winter Garden Theater	

== Awards and nominations ==
Year	Award	Category	Nominee(s)	Work	Result	Ref.
2024	Screen Actors Guild Awards	Outstanding Performance by an Ensemble in a Drama Series	Various (Note: Ben Ahlers, Ashlie Atkinson, Christine Baranski, Denée Benton, Nicole Brydon Bloom, Michael Cerveris, Carrie Coon, Kelley Curran, Taissa Farmiga, David Furr, Jack Gilpin, Ward Horton, Louisa Jacobson, Simon Jones, Sullivan Jones, Celia Keenan-Bolger, Nathan Lane, Matilda Lawler, Robert Sean Leonard, Audra McDonald, Debra Monk, Donna Murphy, Kristine Nielsen, Cynthia Nixon, Kelli O'Hara, Patrick Page, Harry Richardson, Taylor Richardson, Blake Ritson, Jeremy Shamos, Douglas Sills, Morgan Spector, John Douglas Thompson, and Erin Wilhelmi)	The Gilded Age	Nominated	
2026	Theatre World Award	—	Ahlers	Death of a Salesman	Won	

== See also ==
- List of American actors
- List of people from Iowa
- List of University of Michigan alumni
