= When the Streetlights Go On =

- Genre: Drama; Crime
- Written by: Eddie O'Keefe; Chris Hutton
- Directed by: Rebecca Thomas
- Starring: Chosen Jacobs; Sophie Thatcher; Ben Ahlers; Tony Hale; Queen Latifah; Sam Strike; Mark Duplass
- No. of seasons: 1
- No. of episodes: 10

Production
- Executive producers: Chad Hamilton; Tariq Merhab; Eddie O'Keefe
- Producers: Jonathan Ira Schwartz; Kenneth Requa; Halee Bernard
- Cinematography: Aaron Morton
- Production companies: Paramount Television Studios; Anonymous Content

Original release
- Network: Quibi
- Release: April 6 – April 15, 2020

When the Streetlights Go On is an American drama television series written by Eddie O'Keefe and Chris Hutton that debuted on Quibi on April 6, 2020.

== Premise ==
After the murder of a beautiful young girl rocks a suburban community, the victim's sister and her high school peers must struggle to find a sense of normalcy while coming of age in the midst of the murder investigation.

== Cast ==
- Chosen Jacobs as Charlie Chambers, the show's narrator, recounting his youth, as he used to be neighbors with the Monroe family.
- Sophie Thatcher as Becky Monroe, the sister of Chrissy Monroe, who was murdered.
- Kristine Froseth as Chrissy Monroe, a murdered high school girl who seemed to have her whole life ahead of her.
- Ben Ahlers as Brad Kirchoff, Chrissy Monroe's boyfriend; a hot-headed jock grieving for Chrissy who also tries courting Becky in the wake of her death.
- Sam Strike as Casper Tatum, a moody James Dean type with a chip on his shoulder; he shares a class with Becky, and begins courting her.
- Julia Sarah Stone as Berlice Beaman, a nerdy girl Charlie briefly dates.
- Queen Latifah as Detective Grasso, a blunt yet diplomatic small town detective trying to solve Chrissy's murder.
- Tony Hale as Mr. Boque, a teacher who encourages Charlie to make sense of the town's worry and fear by way of writing an earnest, introspective piece on Chrissy's murder for the school newspaper.
- Mark Duplass as Mr. Carpenter, Chrissy's English teacher, whom she was having an affair with.
- David James Lewis as Mr. Jablonski, the small town's dentist, and a neighbor of the Monroe's.
- Nnamdi Asomugha as adult Charlie Chambers.

=== Pilot 2017 ===
- Max Burkholder as Charlie Chambers
- Odessa Young as Becky Monroe
- Ben Winchell as Brad Kirchhoff
- Adam Long as Casper Tatum
- Kelli Mayo as Berlice Beaman
- Graham Beckel as Detective Hoffman
- Drew Roy as Mr. Carpenter
- Nicola Peltz as Chrissy Monroe

== Episodes ==
No.	Title	Directed by	Written by	Original release date
1	"Cicadas"	Rebecca Thomas	Eddie O'Keefe & Chris Hutton	April 6, 2020
2	"Closed Casket"	Rebecca Thomas	Eddie O'Keefe & Chris Hutton	April 6, 2020
3	"Wrong Number"	Rebecca Thomas	Eddie O'Keefe & Chris Hutton	April 6, 2020
4	"Homecoming"	Rebecca Thomas	Eddie O'Keefe & Chris Hutton	April 7, 2020
5	"Notes from the Wrong Side of the Tracks"	Rebecca Thomas	Eddie O'Keefe & Chris Hutton	April 8, 2020
6	"Deodorant & Nicotine"	Rebecca Thomas	Eddie O'Keefe & Chris Hutton	April 9, 2020
7	"Warmth of the Sun"	Rebecca Thomas	Eddie O'Keefe & Chris Hutton	April 10, 2020
8	"Halloween"	Rebecca Thomas	Eddie O'Keefe & Chris Hutton	April 13, 2020
9	"Annotations"	Rebecca Thomas	Eddie O'Keefe & Chris Hutton	April 14, 2020
10	"When The Streetlights Go On"	Rebecca Thomas	Eddie O'Keefe & Chris Hutton	April 15, 2020

== Reception ==
On Rotten Tomatoes, the series has a 71% rating with an average score of 6.9 out of 10 based on 21 reviews. The site's critical consensus read: "When the Streetlights Go On takes itself a little too seriously, but strong writing, an impressive cast, and most importantly, an intriguing mystery more than make up for it."
