= Sonja Warfield =

American writer and producer

Sonja Warfield is an American writer and producer. She is the co-writer of The Gilded Age, for which she was nominated for a Primetime Emmy Award.

== Life and career ==
Warfield was raised in Beachwood, Ohio, a suburb of Cleveland. Her father is former professional football player Paul Warfield. She attended the Laurel School and graduated in 1988. She received her bachelor's degree from USC, and while a student was the member of an improv troupe. After college she briefly pursued acting before moving into screenwriting.

She was a screenwriter for Will & Grace, The Game, Liv and Maddie, Zoe Ever After, She-Ra, and Jake in Progress. She named Zora Neale Hurston as her favorite writer.

Warfield is the co-writer and co-showrunner for the HBO period drama The Gilded Age. She discussed creating Peggy, played by Denée Benton, as a way "to give a Black character in a period piece a storyline outside of slavery." In October 2025 it was announced that Warfield and Susan Fales-Hill will adapt the YA series The Davenports, which is in production at Prime Video.
