= Jordan Donica =

American actor and singer

- Donica as the Phantom in The Phantom of the Opera
- Born: Jordan Matthew Donica; April 18, 1994 (age 32); Minneapolis, Minnesota, U.S.
- Education: Otterbein University (BFA)
- Occupations: Actor, singer
- Years active: 2013 - present
- Known for: The Phantom of the Opera, Camelot, The Gilded Age
- Website: http://www.jordan-donica.com

Jordan Donica (born April 18, 1994) is an American actor and singer. He is known for his theatrical roles in stage musicals on Broadway and in the West End.

He made his Broadway debut as a replacement, playing Raoul in The Phantom of the Opera from 2016 to 2017, and again in 2022. He then starred in Lincoln Center revivals portraying Freddy Eynsford-Hill in My Fair Lady (2018) and Sir Lancelot in Camelot (2023), the latter of which earned him a nomination for the Tony Award for Best Featured Actor in a Musical. In 2025, he starred as Max von Mayerling in the closing cast of the Broadway revival of Sunset Boulevard. Donica made his West End debut in 2026 as the titular character in The Phantom of the Opera as a part of the production's 40th anniversary replacement cast.

Donica has also appeared in television with roles in Charmed (2019–2022) and The Gilded Age (2025-present). In addition to his Broadway credits, he also starred in the first United States national tour of Hamilton as the Marquis de Lafayette and Thomas Jefferson.

== Early life ==
Donica was born April 18, 1994, in Minneapolis, Minnesota. He was raised in Indianapolis, Indiana and began performing at the age of six. At the age of eight, after seeing a touring company of The Phantom of the Opera, he was determined to pursue a career in musical theatre. He went on to study at Otterbein University, where he graduated cum laude with a BFA in musical theater. Some of his university production credits include Les Misérables, Dames at Sea, How to Succeed in Business, and Into the Woods.

== Career ==
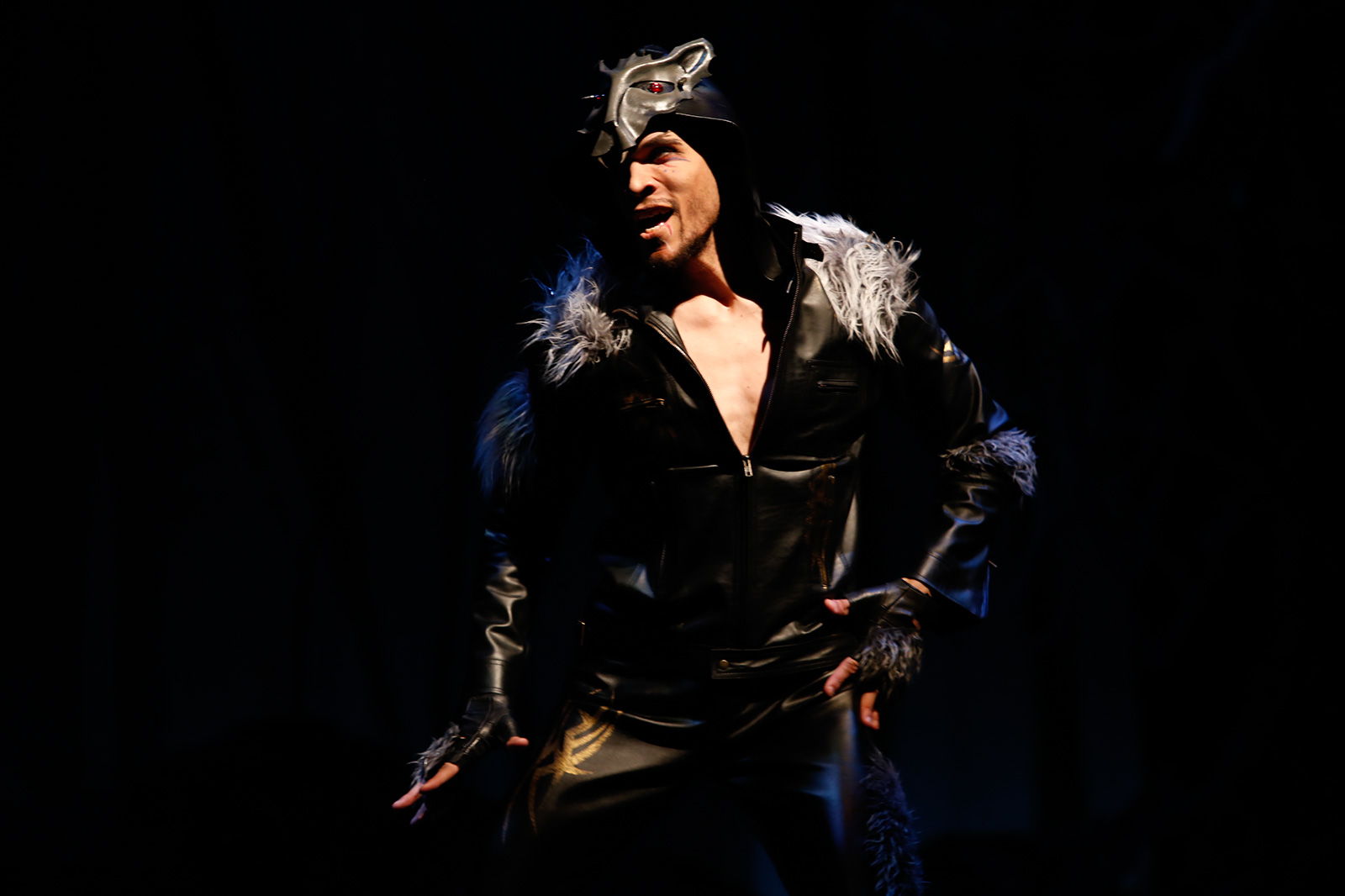
Donica as The Wolf in Into the Woods

Donica made his made his Broadway debut in 2016, starring as Raoul, Vicomte de Chagny in the Broadway production of Andrew Lloyd Webber's The Phantom of the Opera. He reprised the role in the summer of 2022 during the absence of John Riddle.

Soon after, he starred as Marquis de Lafayette and Thomas Jefferson in the first Los Angeles and San Francisco productions of Hamilton. He then returned to Broadway for the role of Freddy Eynsford-Hill in the 2018 Tony-nominated Lincoln Center Theater production of My Fair Lady.

Donica joined the main cast for the second season of the CW's Charmed, and guest starred in an episode of Blue Bloods.

In 2019, he starred as Sir Lancelot in Lincoln Center Theater's gala production of Camelot opposite Lin-Manuel Miranda and Solea Pfeiffer. He would reprise this role in a 2023 Broadway revival opposite Phillipa Soo and Andrew Burnap. He earned a Tony Award for Best Featured Actor in a Musical nomination for his performance. In May 2022, he starred as Rapunzel's Prince in the New York City Center Encores! production of Into the Woods opposite Gavin Creel, Sara Bareilles, Heather Headley, Neil Patrick Harris and Denée Benton.

In the summer of 2024, he received critical acclaim for his performance as Inspector Javert in The Muny’s production of Les Misérables. In July 2026, he performed at Radio City Music Hall in an encore performance of the song "Stars" along fellow past and current Javert actors Philip Quast, Bradley Jaden, and Jeremy Secomb after a performance of Les Misérables.

In February 2025, he starred as Gleb in a concert staging of Anastasia at Lincoln Center. On June 10, 2025, Donica replaced David Thaxton as Max von Mayerling in Jamie Lloyd’s revival of Sunset Boulevard on Broadway opposite Nicole Scherzinger. He stayed with the show through its closing on July 20. In the fall of 2025, he starred in Arena Stage’s production of Damn Yankees. He starred in New York City Center’s Encores! staging of The Wild Party in March 2026.

In 2024, Donica was cast to make his West End debut as the title role in The Phantom of the Opera, but instead joined the cast of HBO Max’s The Gilded Age (2025). In September 2026, Donica began starring as The Phantom in the West End cast of The Phantom of the Opera at His Majesty's Theatre in London through the spring of 2027 as part of the show's 40th anniversary celebrations. He was the first black principal performer to play the role in London. That same year, he voiced the Phantom in Erin A. Craig's audiobook Our Strange Duet (2026), a new reimagining and followup to Webber's The Phantom of the Opera.

In addition to his theatre and television work, Donica has been featured at the Washington National Opera gala at The Kennedy Center, with the Pasadena Symphony, and with the Indianapolis Symphony Orchestra.

== Filmography ==
=== Television ===
Year	Title	Role	Notes
2017	Curb Your Enthusiasm	Marquis de Lafayette / Thomas Jefferson	Episode: "The Shucker"
2019	Blue Bloods	Joshua Taylor	Episode: "Milestones"
2019–2022	Charmed	Jordan Chase	Main cast; 43 episodes
2025–present	The Gilded Age	Dr. William Kirkland	Recurring cast (season 3); 7 episodes

== Theater credits ==
Year	Title	Role	Venue	Notes
2013	Romeo and Juliet	Romeo Montague	Noblesville Shakespeare in the Park	Regional
2013	Les Misérables	Jean Valjean	Otterbein University	Regional
2014	Dames at Sea	Hennessy / The Captain	Otterbein University	Regional
2014	Jesus Christ Superstar	Jesus Christ	Weathervane Playhouse	Regional
2015	Into the Woods	The Wolf / Cinderella's Prince	Otterbein University	Regional
2015	South Pacific	Seabee	Utah Shakespeare Festival	Regional
2016–2017	The Phantom of the Opera	Raoul, Vicomte de Chagny	Majestic Theatre, Broadway	Replacement
2017	Hamilton	Marquis de Lafayette / Thomas Jefferson	US National Tour	Angelica Company
2018–2019	My Fair Lady	Freddy Eynsford-Hill	Vivian Beaumont Theatre, Broadway	Original cast
2018	The Wicker Husband	Wicker Husband	New World Stages	Staged Reading
2019	Camelot	Sir Lancelot du Lac	Lincoln Center	Concert
2022	Into the Woods	Rapunzel's Prince	New York City Center, Off-Broadway	Encores!
2022	The Phantom of the Opera	Raoul, Vicomte de Chagny	Majestic Theatre, Broadway	Replacement
2023	Camelot	Sir Lancelot du Lac	Vivian Beaumont Theatre, Broadway	Original cast
2023	Exorcistic	Guest Performer	The Box, Off-Broadway	Replacement
2023	The Frogs	William Shakespeare	Lincoln Center	Concert
2024	Les Misérables	Inspector Javert	The Muny	Regional
2024	Two Gentlemen of Verona	Valentine	Symphony Space	Concert
2025	Big Fish	Will Bloom	Unknown	Workshop
2025	Anastasia	Gleb Vaganov	Lincoln Center	Concert
2025	Sunset Boulevard	Max von Mayerling	St. James Theatre, Broadway	Replacement
2025	Damn Yankees	Joe Hardy	Arena Stage	Regional
2026	The Wild Party	Burrs	New York City Center, Off-Broadway	Encores!
2026–2027	The Phantom of the Opera	The Phantom of the Opera	His Majesty's Theatre, West End	Replacement for the 40th Anniversary Cast

== Awards and nominations ==
Year	Award	Category	Work	Result
2023	Tony Awards	Best Featured Actor in a Musical	Camelot	Nominated
2025	St. Louis Theatre Circle Awards	Outstanding Performer in a Musical - Male or Non-Binary Role	Les Misérables	Nominated
2025	BroadwayWorld Washington DC Awards	Best Performer In A Musical	Damn Yankees	Nominated
2026	Helen Hayes Awards	Outstanding Supporting Performer in a Musical - Hayes	Damn Yankees	Won
