= Astra TV Award for Best Cable Drama Series =

Award presented by the Hollywood Creative Alliance

Astra Award for Best Cable Drama Series
- Awarded for: Outstanding drama series on cable television
- Country: United States
- Presented by: Hollywood Creative Alliance
- First award: 2021
- Currently held by: Outlander (2024)

The Astra Award for Best Cable Drama Series is an annual award presented by the Hollywood Creative Alliance to honor the best drama television series on cable television. It has been given since its inaugural edition.

== Winners and nominations ==
Winners are listed first in colored row and highlighted in boldface, followed by other nominees.

Year	Program	Network
2021 (1st)
2021 (1st)	**Cruel Summer**	**Freeform**
2021 (1st)	Gangs of London	AMC
2021 (1st)	Lovecraft Country	HBO
2021 (1st)	Perry Mason	HBO
2021 (1st)	Pose	FX
2021 (1st)	Yellowstone	Paramount Network
2022 (2nd)
2022 (2nd)	**Better Call Saul**	**AMC**
2022 (2nd)	**Succession**	**HBO**
2022 (2nd)	Chucky	Syfy
2022 (2nd)	Euphoria	HBO
2022 (2nd)	The Gilded Age	HBO
2022 (2nd)	Snowpiercer	TNT
2022 (2nd)	Winning Time: The Rise of the Lakers Dynasty	HBO
2022 (2nd)	Yellowjackets	Showtime
2023 (3rd)
2023 (3rd)	**Succession**	**HBO**
2023 (3rd)	Anne Rice's Interview with the Vampire	AMC
2023 (3rd)	Better Call Saul	AMC
2023 (3rd)	From	MGM+
2023 (3rd)	The Last of Us	HBO
2023 (3rd)	P-Valley	Starz
2023 (3rd)	The White Lotus	HBO
2023 (3rd)	Yellowjackets	Showtime
2023 (3rd)	Yellowstone	Paramount Network
2023 (3rd)	Your Honor	Showtime
2024 (4th)
2024 (4th)	**Outlander**	**Starz**
2024 (4th)	Billions	Showtime
2024 (4th)	Chucky	Syfy
2024 (4th)	The Curse	Showtime
2024 (4th)	The Gilded Age	HBO
2024 (4th)	Winning Time: The Rise of the Lakers Dynasty	HBO
