= Little Brother (2026 film) =

Film by Matt Spicer

- Release poster
- Directed by: Matt Spicer
- Written by: Jarrad Paul; Andrew Mogel
- Produced by: David Bernad; Ruben Fleischer
- Starring: John Cena; Eric André; Michelle Monaghan; Christopher Meloni
- Cinematography: Brandon Trost
- Edited by: Sara Shaw
- Music by: Dan Deacon
- Production company: Middle Child Pictures
- Distributed by: Netflix
- Release dates: June 18, 2026 (Paris Theater); June 26, 2026 (Netflix)
- Running time: 100 minutes
- Country: United States
- Language: English

Little Brother is a 2026 American comedy film starring John Cena, Eric André, Michelle Monaghan, and Christopher Meloni. Directed by Matt Spicer from a script by Jarrad Paul and Andrew Mogel, it was released on Netflix on June 26, 2026.

The film received mixed reviews from critics.

== Plot ==
Rudd Landy is a successful real estate agent with a wife, Deirdre, and two sons, and he is cast on the reality show NYC Hustlers. Rudd craves the approval of his older brother Josh, a billionaire who overshadows him. Josh refuses to give Rudd the listing for his mansion and outdoes everything Rudd achieves.

Marcus Pinchel, a loner and orphan, escapes from a psychiatric hospital in search of Rudd; Marcus hitchhikes to New York, gets hit by a garbage truck, and ends up in the hospital listing Rudd as his emergency contact. When Rudd and Deidre visit Marcus in the hospital after a phone call, it is revealed that years ago, Rudd mentored Marcus through a Big Brothers-style program, but Rudd had no real camaraderie towards Marcus due to the fact that Rudd only did it to help with his college applications. Rudd hasn't thought about Marcus since. Marcus, however, genuinely believed that he and Rudd were "brothers for life".

Marcus also believes that he and Rudd been exchanging heartfelt emails all these years, but it was actually Rudd's assistant Mia who has been secretly writing back, unable to break it to Marcus that Rudd never responded.

Deirdre insists Marcus stay with them while he recovers. Marcus proceeds to upend Rudd's carefully controlled life — peeing in public in a wildly inappropriate way, bonding with Deirdre more naturally than Rudd, and accidentally becoming the breakout star when he visits the NYC Hustlers set. Rudd tries bribery, manipulation, and avoidance to push him out, but nothing works.

At a party at Josh's mansion, Rudd, haven taken drugs and paranoid, discovers Marcus and Josh talking about feeding the producers ratings, to which Marcus excitedly cheers. Misinterpreting that that Josh will give the mansion to Marcus, Rudd rushes to intervene, trips, and sends Josh falling off a balcony. Marcus saves Josh's life by performing an emergency tracheotomy on the spot.

Instead of thanking Marcus, Rudd grabs a microphone and reveals Marcus' psychiatric history, calls him a liar and a con artist, and lets slip that Mia — not Rudd — wrote every single one of those emails. When Rudd flatly tells him they were never actually brothers, Marcus walks away alone. The producers, however, think that the entire moment was scripted and praise him for his supposed acting.

Rudd's family turns against him due to the incident. Reflecting on his behavior, Rudd reads the emails Marcus sent over the years, understanding Marcus' desire to return as friends. At a televised "Big Brother of the Year" ceremony where producers plan to digitally paste Marcus' face onto a body double, Rudd ditches the script. He confesses his jealousy of Josh, his neglect of Marcus, and ultimately does not accept the award and quits NYC Hustlers as he leaves.

Marcus, believing he has no one left, voluntarily checks back into the psych ward. Rudd finds him there, climbs up to his room, and gives a genuine apology. He tells Marcus that he accepts him as family and always will be. Marcus doesn't forgive him immediately, but he sees the change and hugs him back.

The final scenes show Rudd and Marcus launching a real estate partnership called "Broker Brothers." Mia and Marcus begin a real relationship. Rudd makes peace with his family and lets go of his need for Josh's approval. In the credits scene, The NYC Hustlers producers hire actors to replace Josh and Marcus.

== Cast ==
- John Cena as Rudd Landy
- Eric André as Marcus Pinchel
- Michelle Monaghan as Deirdre Landy
- Christopher Meloni as Josh Landy
- Sherry Cola as Mia
- Ego Nwodim as Lenore
- Caleb Hearon as Olly
- Bryce Gheisar as Cory Landy
- Pilot Bunch as Shane Landy
- Ben Ahlers as Kieran Francis
- Brandon Trost as a cameraman
- Christina Catechis as Nurse Sonj
- Paris Hilton as herself
- Eleonora Srugo as herself
- Trey Murphy as himself
- Evan Ross Katz as himself
- Andy Cohen as the NYC Hustlers announcer
- Tala Ashe as Nina

== Production ==
The Netflix film was directed by Matt Spicer from a script by Jarrad Paul and Andrew Mogel, with David Bernad of Middle Child Pictures and Ruben Fleischer producing.

Eric Andre and John Cena joined the cast in December 2024. Michelle Monaghan joined the cast in July 2025, as did Christopher Meloni, Ben Ahlers, Sherry Cola, Caleb Hearon and Ego Nwodim.

Principal photography took place in New Jersey, under the working title Untitled Roommates Project, in July 2025.

== Release ==
Little Brother premiered at Paris Theater in Manhattan on June 18, 2026. The film was released on Netflix on June 26, 2026.

== Reception ==
On the review aggregator website Rotten Tomatoes, 35% of 40 critics' reviews are positive, with an average rating of 4.6/10. The website's consensus reads: "Little Brother squanders the strong comic chemistry between John Cena and Eric André on a tonally unfocused script that settles for broad, low-hanging gags and recycled buddy comedy beats." Metacritic, which uses a weighted average, assigned the film a score of 52 out of 100, based on 11 critics, indicating "mixed or average" reviews.
