= Electrick Children =

- UK release poster
- Directed by: Rebecca Thomas
- Written by: Rebecca Thomas
- Produced by: Jessica Caldwell; Richard Neustadter
- Starring: Julia Garner; Rory Culkin; Liam Aiken; Bill Sage; Cynthia Watros; Billy Zane
- Cinematography: Mattias Troelstrup
- Edited by: Jennifer Lilly
- Music by: Eric Colvin
- Production company: Live Wire Films
- Distributed by: Phase 4 Films
- Release dates: February 10, 2012 (Berlinale); March 8, 2013 (United States)
- Running time: 96 minutes
- Country: United States
- Language: English
- Budget: $1 million
- Box office: $137,126

Electrick Children is a 2012 American independent coming of age drama film written and directed by Rebecca Thomas in her directorial film debut and starring Julia Garner, Rory Culkin, and Liam Aiken. Garner plays Rachel, a 15-year-old girl from a fundamentalist Mormon community in Utah. After learning that she is pregnant, she believes she has conceived miraculously through listening to a song on a cassette tape.

In writing the script, Thomas drew inspiration from the story of the Virgin Mary, her research on fundamentalist Mormon communities, and her own upbringing. She originally intended to produce the film on a $25,000-budget and hire her family and friends to work on the cast and crew, but when the budget was raised to $1 million she was able to hire professional actors. Filming took place over 25 days in Utah and Nevada in late 2011.

Electrick Children premiered at the Berlin International Film Festival on February 10, 2012, and was released in the United States on March 8, 2013. It received mixed-to-positive reviews from critics and Thomas and Garner received several accolades for their work on the film.

== Plot ==
After her fifteenth birthday, Rachel McKnight, a member of a fundamentalist Mormon community in Utah, listens to a cassette recorder for the first time and hears a cover of "Hanging on the Telephone" by The Nerves on a blue cassette. Her brother, Mr. Will, takes it from her, stating that it is to be used only for God's purposes. When she discovers she is pregnant, she is convinced that she has conceived miraculously, like the Virgin Mary, through the medium of the cassette. After being questioned by her parents, Mr. Will is blamed for impregnating her, and is asked to leave the community, while Rachel is told she will be married the next day. Rather than undergo a forced, unwanted, quick marriage arranged by her father, Paul, Rachel chooses to journey to Las Vegas, to find the unknown-father of the child she is carrying. Unbeknownst to her, Mr. Will is sleeping in the bed of the family's pickup truck when she steals it, and he inadvertently becomes her unwilling companion.

In Las Vegas Rachel falls in with a group of skaters who live together and play in a band, after becoming intrigued by one of the boys who wears a shirt with an image of a cassette on it. Mr. Will, who has been following her, shows himself and pleads with her to confess who she had sex with so that he can return to their community. Rachel has no interest in Clyde, one of the skaters, nor does he for her. However, one night after Mr. Will explains Rachel is carrying "God's child", Clyde offers to marry Rachel, saying that together they can look for the man on the tape, whom Rachel believes is the father of her immaculately-conceived child. She is visibly relieved at the idea of their union protecting her from her father's unwanted arranged marriage, and that a marriage aligns with her religious beliefs, so she accepts his offer and announces they are now married.

Clyde and Rachel break into his parents' house looking for food and money, accompanied by Mr. Will and Clyde's roommate. Clyde's father calls the police and Mr. Will is arrested while Rachel flees. Remembering one of her mother's bedtime stories, she feels guided to follow a red Mustang that drives near her on the highway. She discovers that its owner, Tim, is the man who recorded the tape, and is, in fact, her biological father, not the father of the baby she's carrying, as she'd previously believed.

Disappointed and confused, Rachel decides to return to her community. Meanwhile, Mr. Will is bailed out of jail by Tim, who is looking for Rachel. Together, Tim and Mr. Will drive out to the community, and on the way they discover Clyde, whose van has broken down on the highway. As Rachel is on the altar about to be wed into a forced marriage, Tim, Mr. Will, and Clyde peel up in front of the church in the red Mustang and rescue her.

Mr. Will later returns to the community and is accepted back by his mother, after sharing a "confession of sorts" that Rachel has recorded on the blue cassette stating she still firmly believes that God fathered her child and guided her, every step of her journey. Mr. Will's father is not present at this decision.

Some months later, Clyde and a visibly pregnant Rachel are living in a tent by the beach, and hold hands as they walk through the waves.

Back in the community, Mr. Will tentatively sits down at the table covered in Biblical texts used for confessions and interrogations with the tape recorder - the chair previously used only by his father, the leader of the fundamentalist community. Light shines through the window onto the texts as Mr. Will sits and appears to slowly take in the magnitude of all before him. Slowly, he reaches out to touch the items, seemingly accepting his fate as the next, more compassionate, worldly-experienced leader of their sect.

== Cast ==
- Julia Garner as Rachel McKnight
- Rory Culkin as Clyde
- Liam Aiken as Mr. Will
- Bill Sage as Tim
- Cynthia Watros as Gay Lynn
- Billy Zane as Paul

== Production ==
=== Development ===
Director Rebecca Thomas was raised as a Mormon. She first researched Mormon fundamentalism for a documentary, and the religious group portrayed in Electrick Children is based on this research. She wanted to write a film based on scripture and decided to adapt the story of the Virgin Mary. In writing the script, she drew from her own experience of growing up in Las Vegas and the conflict she perceived "between the traditions of Mormon culture in Utah and the bright lights of Las Vegas". She was also inspired by Pier Paolo Pasolini's "nonjudgmental approach" to religion in The Gospel According to St. Matthew. Thomas began writing the script in April 2011, after her second year of studying at the Columbia University School of the Arts.

Thomas and producer Jessica Caldwell, also a Columbia student, originally intended to make the film on a "microbudget" of $25,000. To raise funds, they created a Kickstarter project which Caldwell showed to another producer, Richard Neustadter, who donated $5000. After reading the script, he contacted Thomas and asked if he could help to produce the film with a larger budget. Thomas agreed and Neustadter went on to raise $1 million for the film's production. Thomas had initially planned to recruit her friends and family to work on the film's cast and crew, but the larger budget allowed her to hire professional actors. She hired several of her Columbia classmates to work on the film's crew.

=== Casting ===
Julia Garner was cast less than a week before filming began. Another actor, Peter Vack, had recommended her to Thomas, who said that Garner "was one of the only actresses I found who looked young enough, but also had a mature emotional depth". Electrick Children marked Garner's first lead role in a film, and Thomas thought that her inexperience in acting made her "very teen-like". Thomas sought out Rory Culkin to play Clyde, while Billy Zane was cast on the recommendation of the casting director, who was a friend of Zane.

=== Filming ===
The film was shot over 25 days in September–October 2011. The first part of production took place in Utah, where filming locations included Hurricane and the ghost town of Grafton, Utah. The latter half of filming was completed in Nevada, with locations including Las Vegas and Indian Springs, Nevada. An additional scene was also shot at San Onofre State Beach in California.

== Release ==
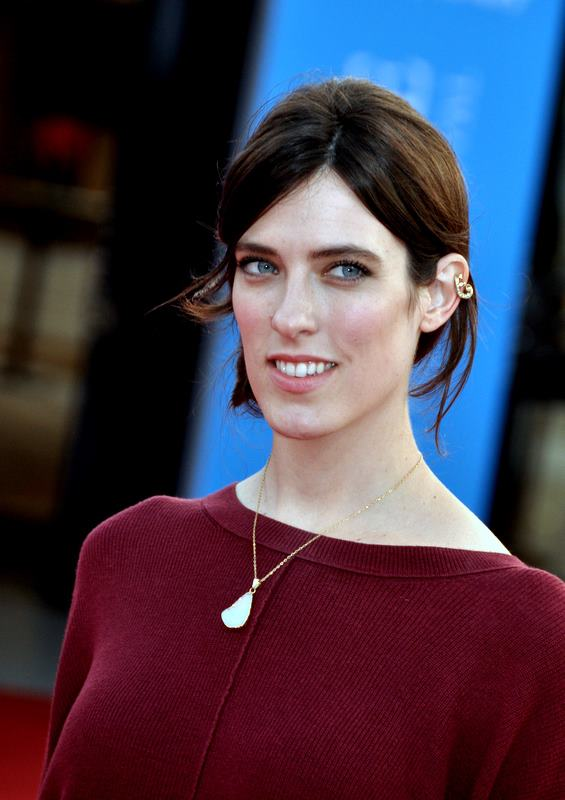
Writer-director Rebecca Thomas at the Deauville Film Festival

Electrick Children had its world premiere at the Berlin International Film Festival on February 10, 2012. It was screened at the South by Southwest Film Festival on March 15, 2012, and went on to be shown at the Buenos Aires International Festival of Independent Cinema, the Deauville American Film Festival, the Miskolc International Film Festival, the Mumbai Film Festival, the Woodstock Film Festival, the Camerimage Film Festival, the Palm Springs International Film Festival, and the Tallinn Black Nights Film Festival.

The film was distributed by Phase 4 Films in the United States. It was given a "day-and-date release" on March 8, 2013, meaning that it was released simultaneously in theaters and on video on demand. It was also released theatrically in the United Kingdom, Russia, New Zealand, France, Brazil, and Spain, grossing a total of $137,126 outside of the U.S.

== Reception ==
=== Critical response ===
On the review aggregator website Rotten Tomatoes, 88% of 25 critics' reviews are positive, with an average rating of 6.10/10. The website's consensus reads: "A strong directorial debut for Rebecca Thomas, Electrick Children also features an outstanding performance from Julia Garner as a wild teenager from a conservative family." Metacritic, which uses a weighted average, assigned the film a score of 60 out of 100, based on nine critics, indicating "mixed or average" reviews.

The New York Times film critic Stephen Holden described Electrick Children as "neither comedy nor drama nor satire but a surreal mélange infused with magical realism". He criticised its lack of narrative continuity but said "the movie's underlying sweetness leaves a residual glow" and praised Garner's "radiant performance".

Catherine Shoard of The Guardian awarded the film 3 out of 5 stars, describing it as overly quirky but "so deftly done it's three parts enchantment to one part irritation". She called Garner's performance "magnetic", and thought that the religious community was convincingly portrayed. Variety magazine's Leslie Felperin called the film "a sweet slice of indie quirk", and praised the direction and acting despite feeling that the script had been "overworked".

Writing for The Hollywood Reporter, Justin Lowe highlighted Thomas's direction, Mattias Troelstrup's cinematography, and the performance of Garner, whom he described as "a revelation". Chuck Bowen of Slant Magazine described Thomas as "an exceptional stylist", commending her for avoiding clichés, and wrote that "Electrick Children is one of the most sensible and humane explorations of youthful curiosity and alienation I've seen in some time." The Los Angeles Times' Gary Goldstein, however, found the film to be "unevenly told and at times too fanciful for its own good".

=== Accolades ===
Electrick Children gained Thomas—at that time a fourth-year student at Columbia University School of the Arts—a nomination for the "Someone to Watch" award at the 2012 Independent Spirit Awards. It won her the FIPRESCI Award at the 2012 International Festival of Independent Cinema PKO Off Camera in Kraków, Poland, and a "Directors to Watch" award at the Palm Springs International Film Festival. Electrick Children won Best Film at the Tallinn Blacks Night Film Festival and Garner won Best Young Actress at the BUSTER Copenhagen International Film Festival for Children and Youth and Best Actress at the Mumbai Film Festival.
