= Rebecca Thomas =

American film director

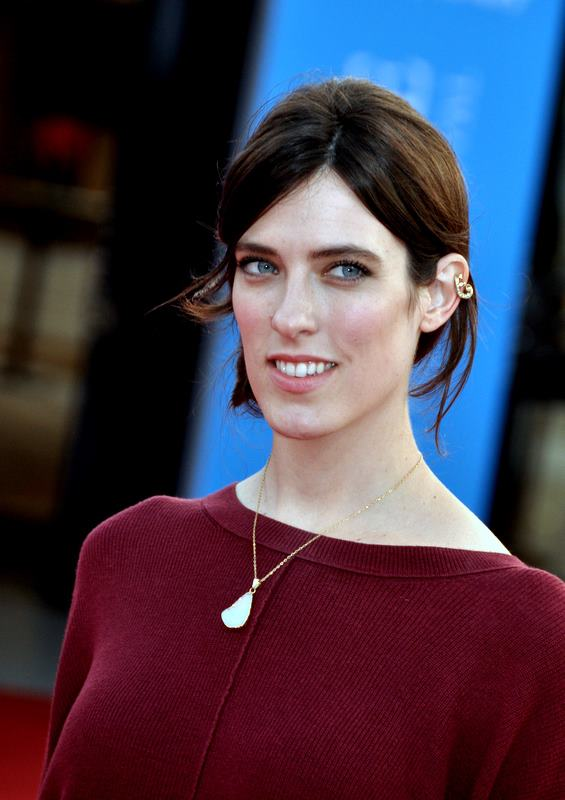
- Thomas in 2012
- Born: December 10, 1984 (age 41); Las Vegas, Nevada, US
- Education: Columbia University
- Occupations: Film director, writer
- Years active: 2009–present

Rebecca Ann Thomas (born December 10, 1984) is an American filmmaker and television director, best known for writing and directing the film Electrick Children and episodic television, including Stranger Things, Limetown, and When the Streetlights Go On.

== Personal life ==
Thomas was raised as a member of the Church of Jesus Christ of Latter-day Saints in Las Vegas; she served a mission for 18 months in Japan. She is married to Mark Garbett (of The Moth & The Flame).

== Directing career ==
Thomas' short film called "Nobody Knows You, Nobody Gives a Damn" premiered at the 2009 Sundance Film Festival.

Her debut feature, Electrick Children, debuted at the Berlin International Film Festival on 10 February 2012. It also played in the U.S. at the South by Southwest Film Festival on 15 March 2012.

Thomas directed episode seven, "The Lost Sister", of the second season of the Netflix series, Stranger Things. The episode received some negative reception, with Tom Philip for GQ writing, "Easily the worst episode Stranger Things has ever produced, and arguably among the worst in TV history."

Thomas directed all 10 episodes of Limetown, starring Jessica Biel, and also directed all 10 episodes of When the Streetlights Go On.

== Filmography ==
Short film

Year	Title	Director	Writer	Notes
2009	Nobody Knows You, Nobody Gives a Damn	No	Yes	Also actor
2009	Ivan Sings	Yes	No	
2016	Las Vegas, West	Yes	Yes	

Feature film

Year	Title	Director	Writer
2012	Electrick Children	Yes	Yes
2026	Wardriver	Yes	No

Television

Year	Title	Director	Executive Producer	Notes
2016	Sweet/Vicious	Yes	No	Episode "The Blueprint"
2017	Stranger Things	Yes	No	Episode "Chapter Seven: The Lost Sister"
2019	Limetown	Yes	Yes	10 episodes
2020	When the Streetlights Go On	Yes	No	10 episodes
2022	Archive 81	Yes	Yes	4 episodes
2025	Doc	Yes	No	2 episodes
2026	Line of Fire	Yes	No	3 episodes

Other credits

Year	Title	Role	Notes
2009	Spit	Production designer	Short film
2011	Not Dark Yet	Production staff	Short film
2013	Lea	Actor	Short film
2015	Teddy Boy	Production assistant	
