= Light House: A Trifle =

Book by William Monahan

- First edition
- Author: William Monahan
- Language: English
- Genre: Satirical
- Publisher: Riverhead Books
- Publication date: 2000
- Publication place: United States
- Media type: Print (Hardback & Paperback)
- Pages: 223 pp
- ISBN: 978-1-57322-158-0
- OCLC: 43227336
- Dewey Decimal: 813/.6 21
- LC Class: PS3563.O5162 L54 2000

Light House: A Trifle is a 2000 satirical novel by American screenwriter William Monahan. Originally serialized in the Amherst literary magazine Old Crow Review from 1993 to 1995, Monahan sold Light House to Riverhead Books, a Penguin Group imprint, in 1998. Warner Bros. optioned the film rights while the novel was in manuscript and hired Monahan to write the screenplay adaptation. The novel was delayed for two years, with plans to release it alongside the upcoming film; however, the film was never produced.

In 2000, Light House: A Trifle was finally published and garnered critical acclaim: The New York Times proclaimed "Monahan's cocksure prose gallops along", and BookPage Fiction called Monahan "a worthy successor to Kingsley Amis". The story follows an artist named Tim Picasso who runs afoul of a drug lord and seeks refuge at a New England inn in the middle of a nor'easter. It is a work intentionally referential to the satirical novels of the early 19th-century British author Thomas Love Peacock, such as Headlong Hall and Nightmare Abbey.

== Plot summary ==
The story begins with a painter named Tim Picasso who suffers critical rejection from his peers and decides to take a break in the Caribbean, where he ends up crewing on a drug smuggling sailboat. When the captain gets drunk and falls overboard, Picasso takes the boat to Florida, and meets up with Jesus Castro, the lead drug smuggler. Castro intimidates Picasso into running the drugs from Miami to Boston, however after Picasso collects the $1.5 million payment from the Irish Republican Army, he escapes by train to the New England town of Tyburn, where a winter storm is picking up force. He decides to lodge at the seaside Admiral Benbow Inn for the weekend, until he can depart for Italy.

Meanwhile, Mr. Glowery, a bitter New York City journalist and writer who believes that a rival author is sabotaging his literary career, arrives in Tyburn where he is to speak at a fiction workshop being held at the Admiral Benbow Inn. He is immediately tasered by one of Castro's detectives, who mistakenly confuses him for Picasso. Back at the Admiral Benbow Inn, the innkeeper, George Hawthorne, worries about Mr. Briscoe, a cross-dressing contract worker who is stranded in the abandoned lighthouse just off the coast because of the raging nor'easter, while his unhappy wife, Magdalene Hawthorne, threatens to leave him. The next morning, Mr. Glowery is stuck in a restaurant where he is being coerced by a psychotic cook to peddle his novel in order to pay off a debt he incurred during the night. When Professor Eggman, the director of the fiction workshop, comes across Mr. Glowery, he rescues him and brings him back to the inn. However, few people show up for the fiction workshop because of the storm. Hawthorne's wife returns from a spa with Picasso; Mr. Hawthorne informs her that he is trying to procure a prostitute for his new arrival, Jesus Castro, who has registered under the false name of Mr. Wassermann. Mr. Hawthorne asks Picasso if he has had sex with his wife and Picasso meekly admits to it.

At the lighthouse, Mr. Briscoe decides to brave the storm in a landing craft, but is immediately swamped with water and carried by the tide towards the mainland. After Castro avails himself of the services of a prostitute, he rampages around the property searching for Picasso. The storm crashes through the inn. A guest is killed by a billiards table that falls on top of him and is dragged off into the sea. Mr. Glowery is also dragged off into the sea by the storm. Castro and his assistant round up the guests and interrogate them about the location of the $1.5 million Picasso stole. In another part of the inn a fire starts. Finally, Mr. Briscoe shows up and kills Castro's assistant before knocking Castro unconscious. While Hawthorne learns his wife is leaving him for the prostitute, the inn becomes completely engulfed in flames. Picasso, Hawthorne, and Briscoe motor a lobster boat over to the lighthouse, and dump Castro's dead assistant into the sea along with Castro himself, weighed down with two cinder blocks chained to his ankles. When they land on the island, Briscoe runs into the lighthouse and blows himself up. Amongst the rubble of the lighthouse, Picasso notices the inscription "MORTE D'AUTHOR" painted on one of the surrounding rocks and says to the innkeeper "He's been thinking about this for some time, George."

== Publication history ==
Monahan wrote the novel while studying Elizabethan and Jacobean drama at the University of Massachusetts Amherst. Monahan completed a draft of Light House on May 18, 1991, but then "stuck it in a drawer". It remained unpublished until 1993 when he gave it to the literary magazine Old Crow Review to serialize to benefit a food charity. In 1995, a short review from an editor at Factsheet Five described the serial run of Light House as a "gritty screwball comedy set in a Massachusetts coastal hotel during a raging winter storm" that is "very, very funny".

After the original serialization of Light House, Monahan reluctantly rewrote the novel several times at the urging of his agent in New York City. In 1998 Light House was sold to Riverhead Books, an imprint of Penguin Putnam, and Warner Bros. immediately optioned the film rights while the novel was still in manuscript. Penguin Putnam wanted to delay publishing the novel in order to release it concurrent with the anticipated film release. Warner Bros. hired Monahan to write the screenplay adaptation of Light House.

The book's subtitled 'A Trifle,' and it is one. I can't stress enough how bored I was with the fiction in print when I wrote it. The American writer is supposed to be very grave and solemn and really provincial and take himself very seriously and write the best book in the world — and, of course, they never do. I wanted to do something beyond old-hat Joycean tricksterism. Find a way to take postmodern hyperconsciousness and work it back into a book that functions as an accessible entertainment, so there's something for everybody, the way it should be, the way Hamlet works.

— William Monahan, interviewed in The Hartford Courant

In 2000, Light House: A Trifle was finally published in hardcover, and then, the following year, in paperback. Monahan and Bruno Maddox, a fellow former Spy editor, went on a joint book tour billed as the "Minor Novelists Tour" that was interrupted by the 9/11 attacks.

Less than four years after the novel's publication, Monahan bought back the film rights to Light House "I didn't like how the book was published. They wanted to wait for the movie to be made. I got a little hostile. When I was in Spain on Kingdom, I realized I could buy it back. It was an empty, damaging gesture." In an interview with Collider.com he stated that, "It was demoralizing to write a really good book and to realize how little the rewards were, even though the book did quite well, as far as first novels are concerned." Light House was available in a German edition, translated by Ulrike Seeberger.

=== Original serialization ===
- — (January 1993). "Venus and the Rain (part 1)". Old Crow Review (1). FkB Press.
- — (June 1993). "Venus and the Rain (part 2)". Old Crow Review (2). FkB Press.
- — (January 1994). "Venus and the Rain (part 3)". Old Crow Review (3). FkB Press.
- — (June 1994). "Venus and the Rain/Light house". Old Crow Review (4). FkB Press.
- — (January 1995). "Light house". Old Crow Review (5). FkB Press.

=== English and German editions ===
- — (June 2000). Light house: a trifle. New York: Riverhead Books. ISBN 978-1-57322-158-0.
- — (2001). Light house: Roman. Berlin: Aufbau-Taschenbuch-Verl (translated by Ulrike Seeberger). ISBN 978-3-7466-1722-0.

== Literary significance and reception ==
Light House intentionally references the satirical novels of the early 19th-century British author and satirist Thomas Love Peacock, such as Headlong Hall and Nightmare Abbey. Peacock's novels have little plot and are best known for parodying the intellectual modes and pretenses of his contemporaries; his characters normally assemble in characteristic English country houses and predominantly engage in conversation. Nightmare Abbey satirized the English romantic movement and included characters based on Samuel Taylor Coleridge, Lord Byron, and Percy Bysshe Shelley.

When Light House was published in 2000 it was critically acclaimed, however, it had lackluster sales. William Georgiades, in a review for The New York Times, called it "a sort of old English farce that allows Monahan […] to skewer whatever comes to mind: modern art, magazine writing, education, the young". The Chicago Sun-Times construed the storyline as one that "allows Monahan to indulge in wisecracks, lampoons and slurs of seemingly infinite variety" with "literary and artistic pretenders [taking] heavy fire". Mark Rozzo of the Los Angeles Times praised Monahan's "refreshing disregard for believability, making Light House — which contains asides on Freud, Emerson, race and fiction itself — a seriously adult cartoon".

BookPage Fiction's Bruce Tierney called Monahan "a worthy successor to Kingsley Amis" and Alfred Alcorn of the Boston Herald detected "delightful echoes of Vladimir Nabokov, Kingsley Amis, Evelyn Waugh, Flann O'Brien and other modern masters of drollery" in the novel, concluding that "[i]n the end, the girl gets the girl, the bad guys lose, and an old Yankee blows himself up with the eponymous lighthouse and a few chunks of the Virginia Woolf legacy".

After describing the women in Light House as "mainly vehicles for sex" and the men as "mostly hapless", The Boston Globe's Jules Verdone generalized that the entire cast of characters appeared to be created "simply so that [Monahan] can skewer them", allowing that "it makes for a pretty good spectator sport".
