= F. H. Townsend =

British illustrator, cartoonist and art editor (1868–1920)

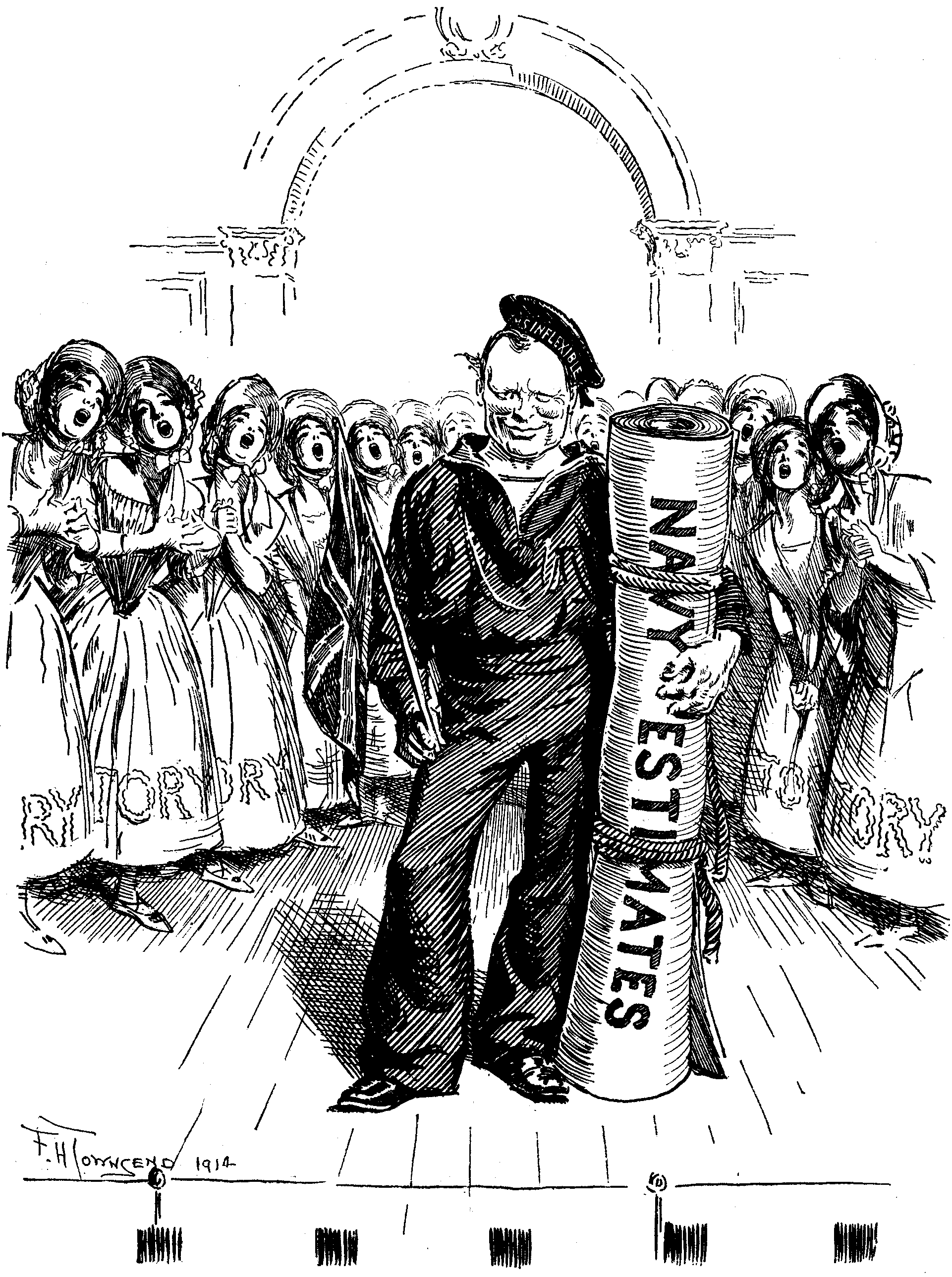
F. H. Townsend cartoon from Punch, 14 January 1914, depicting Winston Churchill

Frederick Henry Townsend ARE (25 February 1868 – 11 December 1920) was a British illustrator, cartoonist and art editor of Punch.

== Career ==
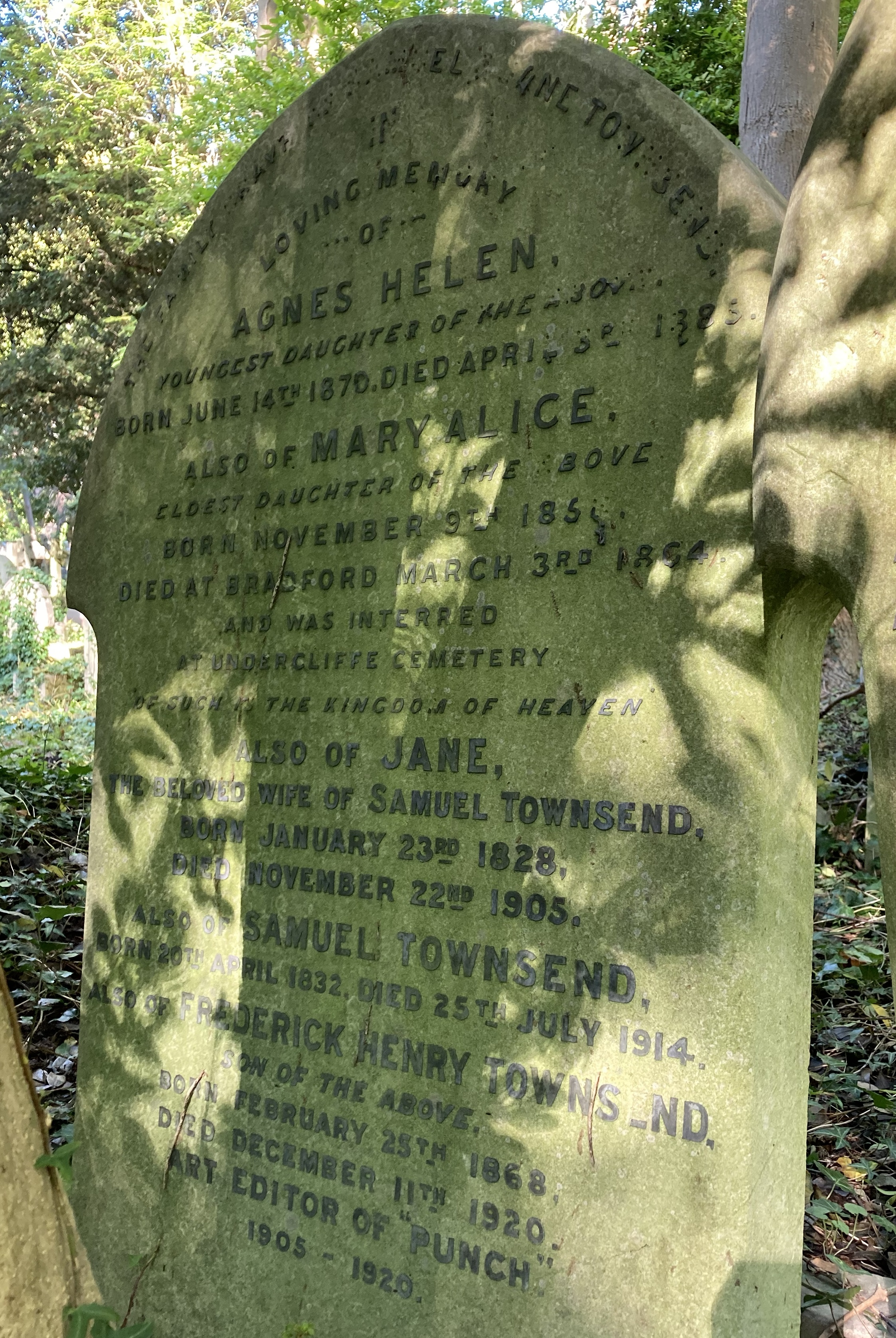
Family grave of F. H. Townsend in Highgate Cemetery

F.H. Townsend illustrated the second edition of Charlotte Brontë's 1847 novel Jane Eyre, A Child's History of England and Gryll Grange, and Nathaniel Hawthorne's House of the Seven Gables in 1902. Also an edition (1907) of Kipling's The Brushwood Boy and the 1903 edition of Arthur Conan Doyle's The Sign of Four. Townsend also contributed cartoons to Punch, becoming its art editor for fifteen years from 1905 until his death.

He was a member of the Chelsea Arts Club (since its foundation in 1891) and the Arts Club (from 1908). In later life he became interested in etching and in 1915 he was elected as an associate of the Royal Society of Painter-Etchers and Engravers (ARE), having studied etching under Sir Frank Short about two years earlier.

Townsend was one of the leading illustrators selected by Percy Bradshaw for inclusion in his The Art of the Illustrator which presented a separate portfolio for each of twenty illustrators. (Note: The portfolio contained: a brief biography of Townsend, an illustration of Townsend at work in his studio, an explanation of Townsend's method of working. This was accompanied by a plate showing an illustration typical of his work and five other plates showing the work at five earlier stages of its production, from the first rough to the just before the finished drawing or colour sketch. Townsend's pen and ink illustration shows two couples relaxing. Townsend's method of first doing a rough sketch and then drawing each character separately before combining the whole is clearly demonstrated. The illustration is dated 1915.)

He died on 11 December 1920 and was buried in a family grave on the eastern side of Highgate Cemetery.

== Works as illustrator ==
Townsend illustrated the following works:

- A Social Departure (1890)
- An American Girl in London (1891)
- Two Girls on a Barge (1981)
- The Simple Adventures of a Memsahib (1893)
- The Path of a Star (1899)
- Those Delightful Americans (1902, by Sara Jeannette Duncan)
- The Burglars' Club: A Romance in Twelve Chronicles
- A Child's History of England
- The Following of the Star: A Romance
- Gryll Grange
- Jane Eyre (second edition)
- Jill: A Flower Girl
- Mr. Punch at Home: The Comic Side of Domestic Life
- The Old Maids' Club
- Secrets of the Sword
- The Joneses and the Asterisks: A Story in Monologue (by Gerald Campbell)
