= Pilford =

Pilford may refer to:

- John Pilford (1769–1834), British naval officer
- USS Pilford (PF-85), a United States Navy patrol frigate transferred to the United Kingdom while under construction which served in the Royal Navy from 1944 to 1946 as HMS Pitcairn (K589)
