= Old Crow Review =

American literary magazine

- Type: Annual literary magazine
- Format: Periodical
- Owner: John Gibney
- Publisher: FkB Press
- Editor-in-chief: Tawnya Kelley-Tiskus
- Editor: John Gibney
- Founded: 1990
- Ceased publication: 2005
- Language: English
- Headquarters: Easthampton, Massachusetts, USA
- Circulation: 500
- Price: USD 7 per issue, USD 14 per year
- ISSN: 1085-6323
- OCLC number: 28298077
- Website: www.oldcrow.org (defunct; image retrieved from the Internet Archive)

The Old Crow Review was an English-language literary magazine established in Amherst, Massachusetts in 1990 by publisher John Gibney, owner of FkB Press, and its editor-in-chief Tawnya Kelley-Tiskus. It published infrequently and distributed locally with a very small circulation; between 1993 and 2005 thirteen issues were published.

== History and significance ==
The Old Crow Review was a multi-genre literary magazine that published short stories, poems, essays, interviews, photography, and art; it had mythic concerns, declaring itself interested in "visions or fragments of visions of a new myth." The literary magazine was founded in 1990 by publisher John Gibney and editor Tawnya Kelley-Tiskus. Old Crow launched its first issue in January 1993 with a press run of 500 and was distributed in the Pioneer Valley of Massachusetts.

The magazine published poetry by Simon Perchik, Patricia Martin, Pat Schneider, Christopher Jones, and Michael Ventura Jones. An early version of screenwriter William Monahan's first novel, Light House: A Trifle, was published serially starting in issue 1 and ending in issue 5. There were also contributions from Sam Cherubin, Tobias Burghardt, and Richard Exner.

Independent bookshop Amherst Books hosted readings by Old Crow Review contributors in 2004 and 2005.

== Reception ==
In 1995, an editor for Factsheet Five wrote a short review of the Old Crow Review's serial run of future screenwriter William Monahan's Light House, describing it as a "gritty screwball comedy set in a Massachusetts coastal hotel during a raging winter storm" that is "very, very funny". Monahan went on to win a Pushcart Prize in 1997 for his short story "A Relation of Various Accidents Observable in Some Animals Included in Vacuo", originally printed in the New York Press but nominated by the Old Crow Review.

== Bibliographic details ==
FkB Press published a total of thirteen issues of the Old Crow Review between the years 1993 and 2005. Each issue was 100 pages. The editors accepted 2-3% out of approximately 1,000 submissions received each year.

All 13 issues of Old Crow Review are available at the W.E.B. Du Bois Library. Issues 1–7, and 12 are available in the Department. of Special Collections at the University of Wisconsin–Madison.

== See also ==
- List of literary magazines
