= Elizabeth Hitchener =

British schoolmistress and poet

- Born: Keymer
- Died: 4 December 1821; Edmonton, London
- Occupation: School teacher

Elizabeth Hitchener sometimes called Portia or Bessy, was a British schoolmistress and poet. Her reputation was ruined after a short, intense and platonic friendship with Percy Bysshe Shelley.

== Life ==
Hitchener's home parish was Keymer and she was baptised in April 1783. Her strong-minded father had been born with the name of Yorke but he had adopted the name of Hitchener after rejecting a life of smuggling to run the Friar's Oak inn at Clayton on the road from Brighton to London.

She was taught at school aged nine by Miss Adams whom she idolised. Adams had treated her as her own daughter, which had annoyed Hitchener's mother.

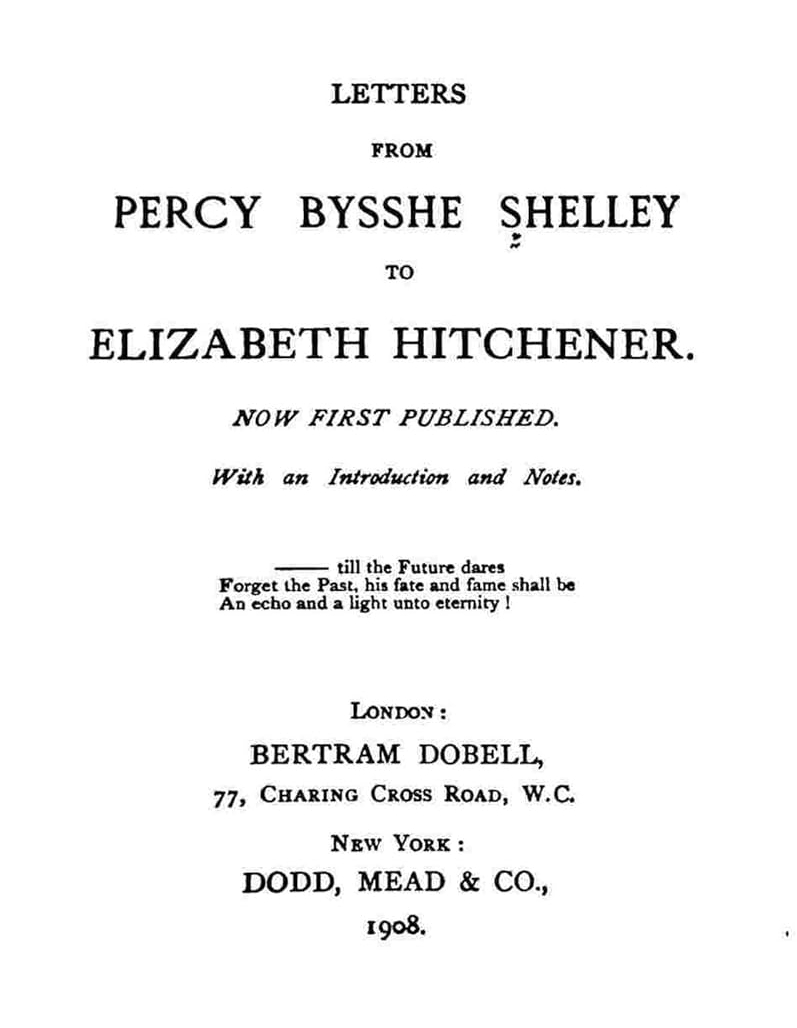
Shelley's Letters to Hitchener republished in 1926

She started a school at Hurstpierpoint with the hope that she could employ her ex-teacher, Miss Adams. Adams had radical views, which had attracted Hitchener, but they had not increased Adams' reputation. Hitchener wanted to care for her. Her ex-teacher did not comply with her plan, but she did attract other pupils and she was said to be a good teacher. One of her pupils was a daughter of a hero of Trafalgar, Captain John Pilfold. Pilfold visited the school and because of this she met Pilfold's nephew who was the poet Percy Bysshe Shelley.

She and the teenage Shelley were intrigued by each other, and over the course of a year, they exchanged about ninety letters, many of which still survive. Virginia Woolf later described Shelley's letters as "amazing". The letters were not romantic but were about their radical ideas. Shelley pointed this out in his lettersand Hitchener was said to be the most intelligent woman Shelley had ever met outside his family.

Hitchener went to live with Shelley and his wife, though she feared for her reputation. John Pilfold and his wife had joined Hitchener's father in advising against this matter, as they also believed it would damage her reputation. She thus decided to simply make a short visit, as she intended to return quickly to her school.

Hitchener was not treated well during her stay. Shelley decided that her name was Portia, and then Bessie, and he and his crowd came to dislike Hitchener. The stay ended suddenly and for an unknown reason, and Hitchener left and decided to go back to teaching at Hurstpierpoint. However, her reputation was damaged, and she could not find any pupils.

She contacted Shelley, and he admitted to others that he had been the cause of her situation. It was suggested that Shelley offered to pay her a pension of £100 per annum, but there is no evidence that this was ever paid.

== Death and legacy ==
Hitchener died aged 38 in 1821. She had written three books starting with "The Fire-side Bagatelle: Containing Enigmas on the Chief Town". "The Weald of Sussex, a Poem" was published in 1822, and her final book "Enigmas, Historical and Geographical" was published in 1834 by "a clergyman's daughter".

Hitchener is possibly the basis of Miss Celinda Toobad, a character in Thomas Love Peacock's 1818 novella Nightmare Abbey.

The journalist Henry James Slack lent William Michael Rossetti some of Shelley's letters to Hitchener. Slack said that the letters had come into his possession from the solicitor and executor of Hitchener's estate. Slack told Thomas James Wise, who saw the letters, that Hitchener had gone abroad and married an Austrian officer, but there appears to be no basis for this claim. Wise published the letters without authority. The letters had been deposited with Slack, on conditions that are unclear; Slack did not claim he owned them. The original letters passed as a legacy to Charles Hargrove, who gave them to the British Museum in 1907, and then to the British Library.
