= Crotchet Castle =

Book by Thomas Love Peacock

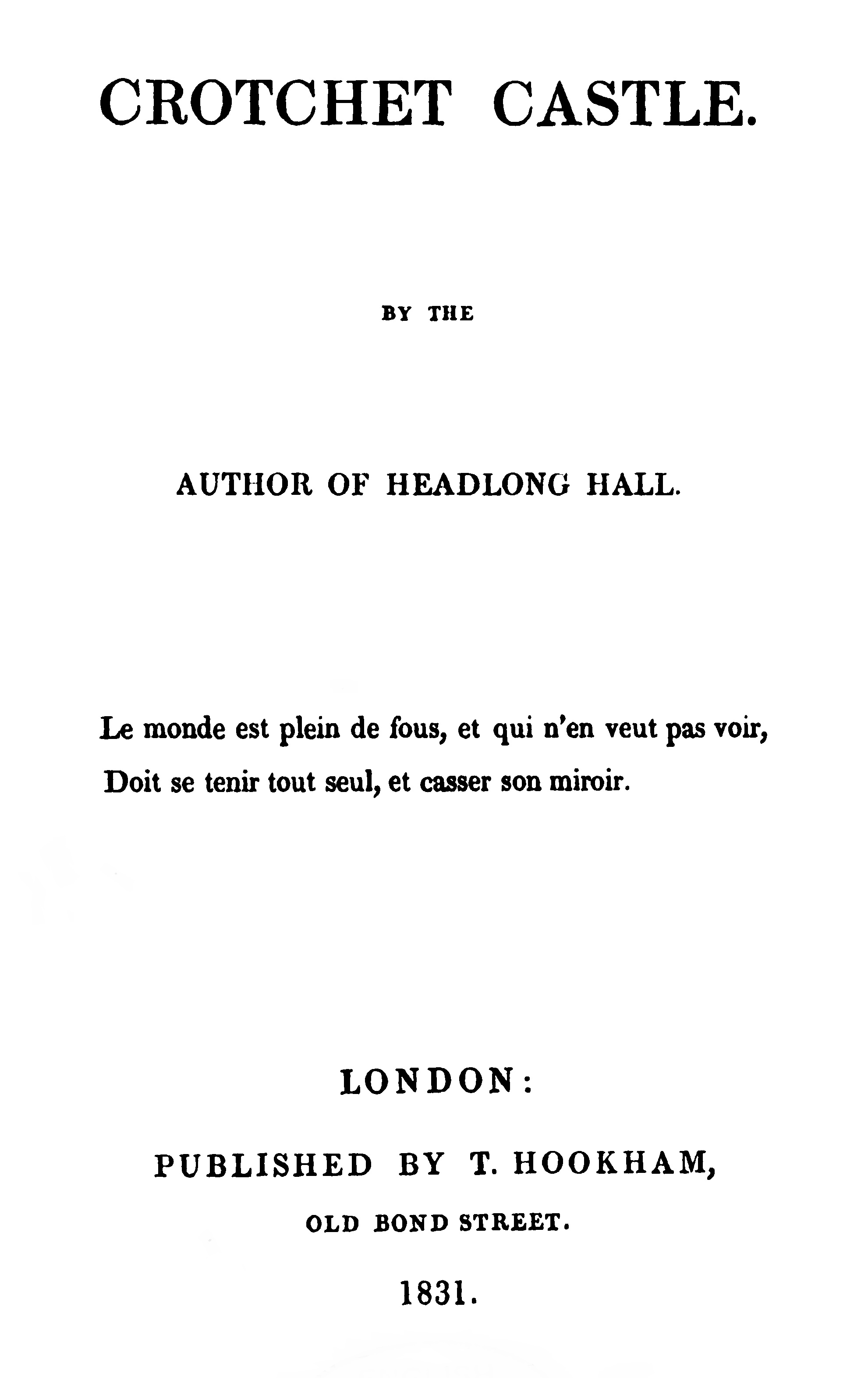
First edition title page

Crotchet Castle is the sixth novel by Thomas Love Peacock, first published in 1831.

As in his earlier novel Headlong Hall, Peacock assembles a group of eccentrics, each with a single monomaniacal obsession, and derives humour and social satire from their various interactions and conversations.

A contemporary definition of crotchet was "a perverse and peculiar notion".

The character who most closely approximates to the author's own voice is the Reverend Doctor Folliott, a vigorous middle-aged clergyman with a love for ancient Greek language and literature, who is greatly suspicious of the reform slogan of the "March of Intellect", as well as anything done by the "learned friend" (his nickname for Lord Brougham). There are two romantic courtships, between Mr. Chainmail (who is convinced that the world has gone downhill continuously since the twelfth century) and Susannah Touchandgo (the daughter of a disgraced banker), and between Captain Fitzchrome (an attractive gentleman with only a moderate income) and Lady Clarinda Bossnowl (the daughter of an impoverished peer, who is cynically determined to make a financially rewarding marriage). The action begins during a house-party in the nouveau riche Mr. Crotchet's villa on the Thames (up-river from London), continues during a river and canal journey towards Wales, and ends in Mr. Chainmail's pseudo-medieval dwelling (near Crotchet's villa), with a parody of the Captain Swing riots.
