= Henry James Slack =

English journalist, activist and science writer

Henry James Slack (1818–1896) was an English journalist, activist and science writer.

== Life ==
The son of Joseph Slack, a cloth merchant, and Grace Slack, he was born in London on 23 October 1818, and educated at North End, Hampstead. He gave up a business career for journalism in 1846, and worked on the North Devon Journal and other provincial papers. He was elected a Fellow of the Geological Society in 1849.

In 1852, Slack became proprietor and editor of The Atlas, where Henry White was literary editor. He also wrote for the Weekly Times, under the signature "Little John". Slack sold The Atlas back to Robert Bell at the end of the 1850s.

Slack advocated liberal ideas: opposition to slavery, the abolition of the paper duties, and the higher education of women. He was a Cobdenite, and a member of the National Education League. In December 1859 he wrote critically of the unpopularity of John Bright.

A friend of the politicians Lajos Kossuth and Giuseppe Mazzini, Slack spoke for Felice Orsini at Exeter Hall in 1856. He was closely identified with the Sunday League, was its president in 1879, and inaugurated the popular lectures for Sunday evenings. He also supported the Sunday opening of museums and picture-galleries, to promote which the Sunday Society was formed in 1875.

From 1862 Slack edited the Intellectual Observer, a development of a journal called Recreative Science, founded in 1859. From 1868 to 1871 it continued as The Student. An amateur microscopist, he was successively secretary and, in 1878, president of the Royal Microscopical Society.

Between 1858 and 1869 he lived at 34 Camden Square, London. He died at his home, Forest Row, Sussex, on 16 June 1896 and was buried in a family grave in Highgate Cemetery.

== Works ==
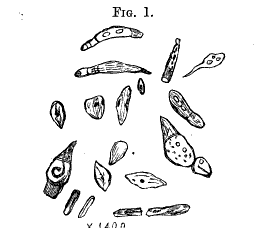
Engraving from an 1867 paper of Henry James Slack, cells from a sample of red wine.

In 1850, Slack published The Ministry of the Beautiful (London), a dialogue on aesthetics, and in 1860 an upbeat treatise The Philosophy of Progress in Human Affairs. The Marvels of Pond Life was a popular introduction to microscope studies (London, 1861; 3rd edit. illustrated, 1878), based on ponds that mostly were quite soon were built over. He was a regular contributor to Knowledge, and 46 papers under his name in the Royal Society's Scientific Catalogue were selected from Popular Science Monthly, the Meteorological Journal, and similar periodicals. In religion he was mainly influenced by the Unitarian William Johnson Fox, whose works he edited in a Memorial Edition (London, 12 vols. 1865–8), with William Ballantyne Hodgson.

== Shelley letters ==
Slack was admitted to the Middle Temple in 1850. In 1868 he was introduced to William Michael Rossetti, as a "legal gentleman", leading to some opaque dealings with a role in literary history. Slack lent to Rossetti some letters of Percy Bysshe Shelley, which had been part of a correspondence in his early life with Elizabeth Hitchener. The story Slack told about how the letters had come into his possession was that he had had them from H. Holste, solicitor and executor to Hitchener who died aged 38 in 1821. What Slack told Thomas James Wise, who saw the letters through Rossetti, was that Hitchener had gone abroad, and married an Austrian officer. Rossetti was interested in publishing poems occurring in the letters, in particular To Mary who Died. Wise, however, unauthorised, published the letters. The letters had been deposited with Slack, on conditions that are unclear. It is also unclear why they were deposited, given that Slack was not a lawyer; and he did not claim he owned them; he gave an indication of the owner as a lady living in Germany.

The original letters passed from Slack's widow as a legacy to Charles Hargrove. From him they went to the British Museum in 1907, and so to the British Library.

== Family ==
Slacks's wife, Charlotte Mary Walters, whom he married in 1840, survived him.

== Notes ==
Attribution

This article incorporates text from a publication now in the public domain: Lee, Sidney, ed. (1897). "Slack, Henry James". Dictionary of National Biography. Vol. 52. London: Smith, Elder & Co.
