= William Monahan =

American screenwriter and novelist

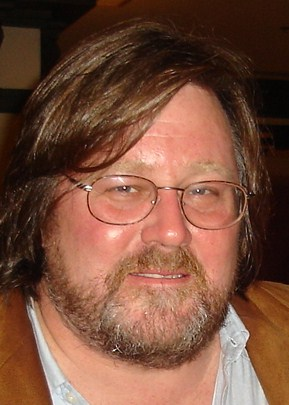
- Monahan in October 2006
- Born: November 3, 1960 (age 65); Boston, Massachusetts, U.S.
- Education: University of Massachusetts Amherst
- Occupations: Screenwriter; novelist; journalist; essayist
- Writing career
- Notable awards: Academy Award for Best Adapted Screenplay (2007); Writers Guild of America Award for Best Adapted Screenplay (2007)

William J. Monahan (born November 3, 1960) is an American screenwriter and novelist. His second produced screenplay The Departed (2006), an adaptation of Andrew Lau's 2002 gangster film Infernal Affairs, earned him a Writers Guild of America Award and Academy Award for Best Adapted Screenplay.

== Life ==
Monahan was born in Dorchester, Boston. He attended the University of Massachusetts Amherst, where he studied Elizabethan and Jacobean drama. He moved to New York City and contributed to the alternative weekly newspaper New York Press and the magazines Talk, Maxim, and Spy. In 1997 Monahan won a Pushcart Prize for his short story "A Relation of Various Accidents Observable in Some Animals Included in Vacuo". Monahan was an editor at Spy during the magazine's final years, where he would come in at the close of the monthly issue to rewrite articles and improve jokes.

In 1999 Talk magazine debuted, and Monahan contributed a travelogue on Gloucester, Massachusetts, to the first issue. In 2000 Monahan's first novel, Light House: A Trifle, was finally published, and it garnered critical acclaim; The New York Times proclaimed, "Monahan's cocksure prose gallops along" and BookPage Fiction called Monahan "a worthy successor to Kingsley Amis." In the second half of 2001 Monahan wrote a fictional column at the New York Press under the pseudonym of Claude La Badarian, which ran for 13 weeks.

== Career ==
Warner Bros. optioned the film rights to the novel Light House: A Trifle. The screenplay adaptation has not been produced. Light House was released in 2000. A few years later, he bought back the rights and took the novel off the market.

In 2001 20th Century Fox bought Monahan's spec script Tripoli, about William Eaton's epic march on Tripoli during the Barbary Wars, in a deal worth mid-six figures in American dollars, with Mark Gordon attached as producer. The script was given to Ridley Scott to direct. Monahan met with Scott to discuss Tripoli, and Scott mentioned his desire to direct a film about knights. Monahan suggested the Crusades as a setting, reasoning that "you've got every conceivable plot imaginable there, which is far more exotic than fiction". Scott was captivated by Monahan's pitch and hired him to write the screenplay for Kingdom of Heaven. Tripoli was eventually shelved, but Monahan retained ownership of the screenplay and therefore the right to consider new offers at a later date.

Monahan steadily secured work in the film industry throughout the 2000s. Brad Pitt's production company, Plan B, hired Monahan to adapt Hong Kong director Andrew Lau's gangster film Infernal Affairs. Monahan respun Infernal Affairs as a battle between Irish American gangsters and cops in Boston's Southie district, and Martin Scorsese directed the completed screenplay under the title The Departed for Warner Bros. Monahan's work on the film would later earn him two Best Adapted Screenplay awards, from the Writers Guild of America and the Academy Awards.

=== Working scripts through production and after ===
Kingdom of Heaven was the first of Monahan's screenplays to be produced into a film. Monahan had negotiated a production write-through contract for Kingdom of Heaven, which allowed him to be present on the movie sets to make modifications to the shooting script during production. It was poorly received by critics when it was released in theaters in 2005. Kingdom was critically reappraised when it was released on DVD in the form of a director's cut that contained an additional 45 minutes of footage previously shot from Monahan's shooting script. Some critics were pleased with the extended version of the film.

Monahan's second produced screenplay was The Departed, an adaptation of the Hong Kong action film Infernal Affairs. Jack Nicholson, one of the leads in the film, influenced the screenplay. "I had written the role as a post-sexual 68-year-old Irishman. Jack is post-sexual exactly never," Monahan said later. "What Jack did is great. Did he change the words? Not any of the good ones." Monahan received considerable praise from critics when the film was released in theaters, in 2006, and was applauded for accurately depicting the city of Boston. Monahan used his intimate knowledge of the way Bostonians talk and act, learned from his youth spent in the many neighborhoods of Boston, to create characters that The Boston Globe described as distinctly indigenous to the city.

By the end of 2006 The Departed had won many critics' prizes. Monahan was honored by The Boston Society of Film Critics with the award for best screenplay, by the Chicago Film Critics Association for best adapted screenplay, and by the Southeastern Film Critics Association with another best adapted screenplay award. Monahan took an unusual route for a screenwriter and hired a publicist to run a campaign promoting his screenplay during awards season. Monahan ended up winning two Best Adapted Screenplay awards for The Departed, from the Writers Guild of America and the Academy Awards. He received an award for his writing in film at the US-Ireland Alliance's second annual "Oscar Wilde: Honoring Irish Writing in Film" ceremony.

=== Producing and directing ===
In 2006 Monahan negotiated a first-look producing deal with Warner Bros., which gave the studio a right of first refusal on any films produced by Henceforth, the production company he started. In return Henceforth received the film rights to produce John Pearson's true crime book The Gamblers, a property which Warner Bros. had previously acquired.

In 2007 Monahan was hired to work on two film projects: an adaptation of the Hong Kong film Confession of Pain and an original rock and roll film, The Long Play. Monahan was initially assigned to executive produce and write the adaptation for Confession of Pain, under production by Leonardo DiCaprio's company, Appian Way, for Warner Bros. Pictures. It would represent his second adaption of an Andrew Lau and Alan Mak film. Monahan's other assignment was to rewrite a screenplay about the history of the rock music business called The Long Play, the brainchild of Mick Jagger, lead singer of The Rolling Stones, which had been incubating at Jagger's production company, Jagged Films at Disney. Martin Scorsese became involved while the film project was at Disney and subsequently negotiated a turnaround deal to bring The Long Play to Paramount. However, neither of these projects were completed.

Monahan's directorial debut was London Boulevard, released in 2010, which he also produced. An adaption of a Ken Bruen work by the same name, it was received with both criticism and praise, with The Hollywood Reporter stating that as director he "sashays winningly" into the premise of Bruen's "stylish line in mean-streets poetry", further commenting the film as "adapted sharply". Others adjudged the film as unfocused, complaining of "a surplus of plot threads that don't have space to play out, and accordingly com[ing] across as clichés", that he "ended up with more than he can chew for his first time in the director's chair".

A few years later, a version of The Gambler was finally generated, as written and executive produced. The film received mixed reviews, with some people complementing Jessica Lange's performance, while others, including Peter Travers from Rolling Stone, calling the film's unclear character motivations "wearying". This remake also suffered from comparison and contrasting with the original film on which it's based.

His most recent directorial and producer credit was the film Mojave, which he also wrote. Announced on March 22, 2012, and cast between December 4 until well past principal photography began, production was stalled until September 27, 2013. The film was released on DirecTV Cinema on December 3, 2015, prior to opening in a limited release on January 22, 2016. The Rotten Tomatoes consensus for the movie is that it "has no shortage of talent on either side of the camera; unfortunately, it amounts to little more than a frustrating missed opportunity." Sean Burns ripped into the movie, calling it "elliptical and at times preposterously entertaining, [a movie] that both sends up and embraces every chest-beating trope in that old alpha 'He-Man of letters' tradition", and dances with the idea that some of the movie "is Monahan indulging in a bit of sardonic self-flaggelation [sic] for all his success in the industry". The Observer's Rex Reed labeled it "gibberish with guns and phony literary pretentiousness about two thugs in a duel of weapons and words that goes nowhere fast", contending that his high-quality work on The Departed was inexplicable, as he had "written nothing of value since". Continuing, he said that "as a director he evokes gales of guffaws".

== Works ==
Novel

- Light House: A Trifle (2000)

Film

Year	Title	Director	Writer	Producer	Notes
2005	Kingdom of Heaven	No	Yes	No	
2006	The Departed	No	Yes	No	Academy Award for Best Adapted Screenplay; Writers Guild of America Award for Best Adapted Screenplay; Golden Globe Award for Best Screenplay; Nominated - BAFTA Award for Best Adapted Screenplay
2008	Body of Lies	No	Yes	No	
2010	Edge of Darkness	No	Yes	No	
2010	London Boulevard	Yes	Yes	Yes	
2014	The Gambler	No	Yes	Executive	
2015	Mojave	Yes	Yes	Yes	
2021	The Tender Bar	No	Yes	No	
2022	Marlowe	No	Yes	No	
