= A Defence of Poetry =

Essay by Percy Bysshe Shelley

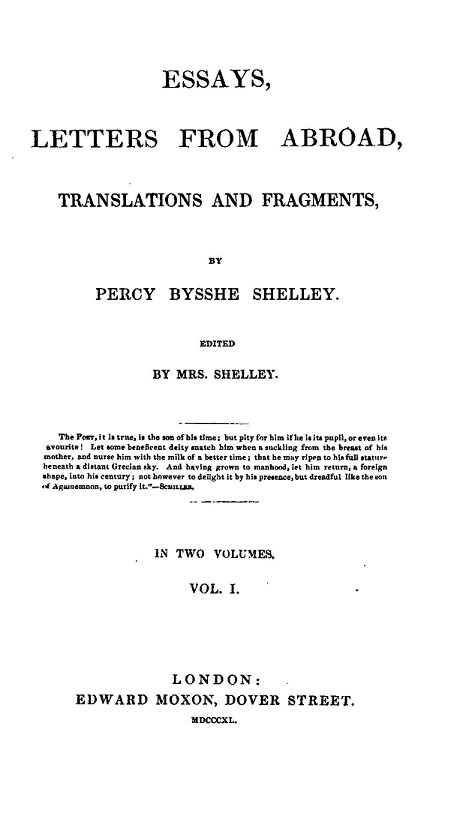
First publication: 1840 title page of Essays. Letters from Abroad, Translations and Fragments by Edward Moxon, London.

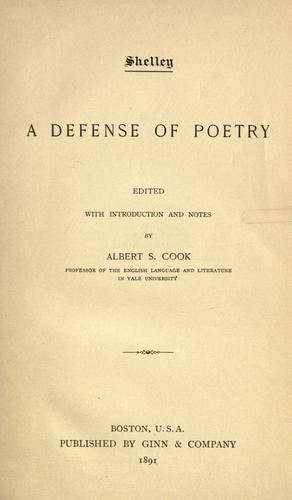
First U.S. publication: 1891 title page of A Defense of Poetry by Ginn and Co., Boston

"A Defence of Poetry" is an unfinished essay by Percy Bysshe Shelley written in February and March 1821 that the poet put aside and never completed. In 1840, the text was published posthumously in Essays, Letters from Abroad, Translations and Fragments. Its earliest U.S. publication was by Ginn and Company in Boston in 1891. Its final sentence expresses Shelley's famous proposition that "Poets are the unacknowledged legislators of the world."

== Background ==
Shelley wrote the essay in response to his friend Thomas Love Peacock's article "The Four Ages of Poetry", which had been published in 1820. Shelley wrote to the publishers Charles and James Ollier (who were also his own publishers):

I am enchanted with your Literary Miscellany, although the last article has excited my polemical faculties so violently that the moment I get rid of my ophthalmia, I mean to set about an answer to it.... It is very clever, but I think, very false.

To Peacock, Shelley wrote:

Your anathemas against poetry itself excited me to a sacred rage. . . . I had the greatest possible desire to break a lance with you ... in honour of my mistress Urania.

The text we know as A Defence of Poetry was eventually published eighteen years after Shelley's death, after being subjected to some editing by John Hunt and Shelley's wife Mary Shelley, in her Essays, Letters from Abroad, Translations and Fragments.

== Editorial introductions ==
Shelley's aim was to show that poets establish morality and inspire the legal norms in a civil society, thus creating a foundation for the other institutions of a community.

Robert M. Hutchins and Mortimer J. Adler wrote

In A Defence of Poetry, [Shelley] attempts to prove that poets are philosophers; that they are the creators and protectors of moral and civil laws; and that if it were not for poets, scientists could not have developed either their theories or their inventions. Poets introduce and maintain morality. The mores so created are codified into laws. The social function or utility of poets is that they create and maintain the norms and mores of a society.

David Perkins wrote:

...Shelley was mainly concerned to explain the moral (and thus the social) function of poetry. In doing so, he produced one of the most penetrating general discussions on poetry that we have.

Andrew Sanders wrote:

"Shelley's projection of the poet as hero, as the leader and representative of society, is more than veiled self-aggrandizement, it a reasonable assertion of the irrational power of the imagination against a purely utilitarian view of art".

== Major themes ==
Shelley’s argument for poetry is an important text of English Romanticism. In 1858, William Stigant, a poet, essayist, and translator, wrote in his essay "Sir Philip Sidney" that Shelley's "beautifully written Defence of Poetry" is a work which "analyses the very inner essence of poetry and the reason of its existence, – its development from, and operation on, the mind of man". Shelley writes in Defence that while "ethical science arranges the elements which poetry has created, and propounds schemes and proposes examples of civil and domestic life", poetry acts in a way that "awakens and enlarges the mind itself by rendering it the receptacle of a thousand unapprehended combinations of thought".

A Defence of Poetry argued that the invention of language reveals a human impulse to reproduce the rhythmic and ordered, so that harmony and unity are delighted in wherever they are found and incorporated, instinctively, into creative activities: "Every man in the infancy of art, observes an order which approximates more or less closely to that from which highest delight results..." This "faculty of approximation" enables the observer to experience the beautiful, by establishing a "relation between the highest pleasure and its causes". Those who possess this faculty "in excess are poets" and their task is to communicate the "pleasure" of their experiences to the community. Shelley does not claim language is poetry on the grounds that language is the medium of poetry; rather he recognises in the creation of language an adherence to the poetic precepts of order, harmony, unity, and a desire to express delight in the beautiful. Aesthetic admiration of "the true and the beautiful" is provided with an important social aspect which extends beyond communication and precipitates self-awareness. Poetry and the various modes of art it incorporates are directly involved with the social activities of life. According to Shelley, "The great secret of moral is love: or going out of our own nature, and an identification of ourselves with the beautiful, which exists in thought, action or person, not our own". Shelley nominated unlikely figures such as Plato and Jesus in their deft use of language to conceive the inconceivable. Shelley contests the traditional contrast between poets and artists, on the one hand, and philosophers and historians, on the other. For him, "Shakespeare, Dante, Milton (to confine ourselves to modern writers) are philosophers of the very loftiest power", and Bacon, Herodotus, Plutarch, Livy are poets.

For Shelley, "poets . . . are not only the authors of language and of music, of the dance, and architecture, and statuary, and painting; they are the institutors of laws, and the founders of civil society." Social and linguistic order are not the sole products of the rational faculty, as language is "arbitrarily produced by the imagination" and reveals "the before unapprehended relations of things and perpetuates their apprehension" of a higher beauty and truth. Shelley's conclusive remark that "Poets are the unacknowledged legislators of the world" suggests his awareness of "the profound ambiguity inherent in linguistic means, which he considers at once as an instrument of intellectual freedom and a vehicle for political and social subjugation".

== Sources ==
- Sandy, Mark. "A Defence of Poetry" by Percy Bysshe Shelley. 25 August 2004. (The Literary Encyclopaedia.)
- Shelley, Percy Bysshe. Essays, Letters from Abroad, Translations and Fragments. In two volumes. Edited by Mary Shelley. London: Edward Moxon, (1840) [1839].
- English Essays: From Sir Philip Sidney to Macaulay. With Introductions and Notes. The Harvard Classics. Edited by Charles W. Eliot, LL.D. NY: P.F. Collier and Son, 1909.
- Bennett, Betty T., and Stuart Curran, editors. Shelley: Poet and Legislator of the World. The Johns Hopkins University Press, 1995.
- Kaufman, Robert. "Legislators of the Post-Everything World: Shelley's Defence of Adorno," English Literary History, 63 (Fall, 1996): 707–33.
- Lee, Monika. "Shelley's A Defence of Poetry and Frye: A Theory of Synchronicity." Lee, Alvin (ed.); Denham, Robert D. (ed.). The Legacy of Northrop Frye. Toronto: University of Toronto Press, 1994. 190–200.
- Shelley, Percy Bysshe. "A Defense of Poetry." Romanticism: An Anthology. Ed. Duncan Wu. Oxford: Blackwell Publishers, 1998. pp. 944–956.
- Verkoren, Lucas. A Study of Shelley's 'Defence of Poetry': Its Origin, Textual History, Sources and Significance. Amsterdam: Mijs, 1937.
- Delisle, Fanny. A Study of Shelley's A Defence of Poetry: A Textual and Critical Evaluation. Volume 2. Edwin Mellen Press, 1974.
- Dod, Elmar. "Die Vernünftigkeit der Imagination in Aufklärung und Romantik. Eine komparatistische Studie zu Schillers und Shelleys ästhetischen Theorien in ihrem europäischen Kontext." (Title: Imaginative Reason in Enlightenment and Romanticism. A Comparative Study of Schiller's and Shelley's Aesthetic Theories in Their European Context.) Tübingen: Max Niemeyer 1985.
- Ferguson, Margaret W. "Border Territories of Defense: Freud and Defenses of Poetry." The Literary Freud: Mechanisms of Defense and the Poetic Will. New Haven: Yale UP, 1980. 149–80.
- Liberto, Fabio (April, 2010). "The Politics of Language in P.B. Shelley." La questione romantica, 2/1, pp. 43–59.
- Mahoney, John L. (1984). "The Idea of Mimesis in Shelley's A Defence of Poetry." The British Journal of Aesthetics, 24(1), pp. 59–64.
- Mahoney, John L. "Teaching 'To a Sky-Lark' in Relation to Shelley's Defense." Hall, Spencer (ed.). Approaches to Teaching Shelley's Poetry. New York: MLA, 1990. 83–85.
- Cameron, Esther (2003). "Shelley's 'Defence' Today." The Antigonish Review, 122.
- Macdonald, Kate. "A Defence of Poetry: A Study of the Relationship Between Percy Shelley and Thomas Love Peacock".
- Leigh, Ivey. "Percy Shelley's A Defense of Poetry: How Hidden Poets Lead to Society's Salvation." British Poetry, Suite101.com. 25 February 2009.
- Kucich, Greg. Keats, Shelley, and Romantic Spenserianism. University Park, PA: Pennsylvania State University Press, 1991.
- Rudy, John G. "Romanticism and Buddhism: Shelley's Golden Wind: Zen Harmonics in A Defence of Poetry and 'Ode to the West Wind'". Romantic Circles Praxis Series.
- O'Neill, Michael (Fall, 1996). "A Defence of Poetry: Reflections on the Occasion of Writing." Criticism.
- Turley, Richard Marggraf. (April, 2000). "An Echo of Clarke's Address in Shelley's Defence?" Neophilologus, 84, 2, pp. 323–27.
- Cox, Jeffrey. Poetry and Politics in the Cockney School: Keats, Shelley, Hunt and their Circle. Cambridge: Cambridge University Press, 1998.
- Baker, John Ross (1981). "Poetry and Language in Shelley's Defence of Poetry." Journal of Aesthetics and Art Criticism, 39, 4, pp. 437–449.
- Eichman, Richard (Spring, 2000). "'Imagining' History: Shelley’s Use of History as Rhetoric in A Defence of Poetry." Publication of the Illinois Philological Association, 3.
- Hall, Jean. (1992). "The Divine and Dispassionate Selves: Shelley’s Defence and Peacock’s The Four Ages." Keats-Shelley Journal: Keats, Shelley, Byron, Hunt, and Their Circles, 41, pp. 139–63.
- Mahon, James Edwin. "Truth and Metaphor: A Defense of Shelley." Debatin, Bernhard (ed.); Jackson, Timothy R. (ed.); Steuer, Daniel (ed.). Metaphor and Rational Discourse. Tübingen, Germany: Niemeyer, 1997, pp. 137–46.
- Smith-Hubbard, Julie L. (2008). "Cosmopoetics and Politics: Were Those 'Unacknowledged Legislators of the World' Actually Women?" Forum on Public Policy.
- Pottle, Frederick A. "The Case of Shelley." English Romantic Poets: Modern Essays in Criticism. Ed. M. H. Abrams. 2nd ed. London: Oxford University Press, 1975, pp. 366–83.
- Rich, Adrienne. "Legislators of the world. Commentary: In our dark times we need poetry more than ever, argues Adrienne Rich." The Guardian, 18 November 2006.
- McElderry, B. R. Jr. (1944). "Common Elements in Wordsworth's 'Preface' and Shelley's Defence of Poetry." Modern Language Quarterly, 5(2), pp. 175–181.
