= The Four Ages of Poetry =

The Four Ages of Poetry, an essay of 1820 by Thomas Love Peacock, was both a significant study of poetry in its own right, and the stimulus for Percy Bysshe Shelley's A Defence of Poetry.

== Plot ==
Peacock wrote "The Four Ages of Poetry" in 1820, a time when Romanticism was at its height. He was a contemporary of such Romantic poets as Percy Bysshe Shelley and Lord Byron, whose works he often satirized. The Four Ages of Poetry reflects Peacock's own views on the nature and purpose of poetry, as well as his critique of the Romantic movement.

Peacock begins by describing the Iron Age of poetry, which he characterizes as the time of "rude bards" who celebrate the exploits of "ruder chiefs" in "rough numbers." He then moves on to the Golden Age, which he associates with Homer and the epic poets, whose works he praises for their simplicity and power.

The Silver Age, according to Peacock, is characterized by the rise of civilized life and the emergence of two types of poetry: "imitative" and "original." He cites Virgil as an example of a strong imitator, while casting the original poetry of the Silver Age as the emergence of comic and satirical forms.

Finally, Peacock arrives at the Brass Age, the age in which he believes he lives, which he sees as a period of decline for poetry. He criticizes the poets of his own time for their excessive ornamentation, artificiality, and lack of genuine feeling.

== Setting and tone ==
Much of the ‘Four Ages’ is an attack from a utilitarian standpoint on the Romantic poets with whom Peacock was closely associated, and whom indeed he defended publicly from criticism elsewhere. But, ever the parodist, Peacock's argument cut both ways. As M. H. Abrams put it, “If he was a poet who mocked at poets from a Utilitarian frame of satirical reference, he was a Utilitarian who turned into ridicule the belief in utility and the march of intellect”. Nevertheless, while humorous, Peacock's essay also raised several serious critical points.

== Poetic origins ==
Peacock offered a mocking account of how poets originally developed a claim to be historians or moralists, seeing the first poetry as created by a bard “always ready to celebrate the strength of [the king’s] arm, being first duly inspired by that of his liquor”. As the inflater of royal ‘credit’, the poet was thus placed as precursor to contemporary speculators in paper money and financial credit.

== Primitivism ==
"Mr Scott digs up the poachers and cattle-stealers of the ancient border. Lord Byron cruises for thieves and pirates on the shores of the Morea….Mr Wordsworth picks up village legends from old women". Peacock concluded that the present-day poet was a regressive influence opposed to progress and development, and (herein Peacock was outdoing Jeremy Bentham himself) of no utilitarian merit whatever.

== See also ==
- Biographia Literaria
- Neoclassicism
- Westminster Review
- William Gifford
