= Mojave (film) =

- Theatrical release poster
- Directed by: William Monahan
- Written by: William Monahan
- Produced by: Aaron L. Ginsburg; William Green; Justine Suzanne Jones; William Monahan
- Starring: Garrett Hedlund; Oscar Isaac; Louise Bourgoin; Walton Goggins
- Cinematography: Don Davis
- Edited by: John David Allen
- Music by: Andrew Hewitt
- Production companies: Atlas Independent; Henceforth Pictures; MICA Entertainment
- Distributed by: A24; DirecTV Cinema
- Release dates: April 18, 2015 (Tribeca Film Festival); January 22, 2016 (United States)
- Running time: 93 minutes
- Country: United States
- Language: English
- Box office: $8,602

Mojave is a 2015 American crime thriller film written and directed by William Monahan. The film stars Garrett Hedlund, Oscar Isaac, Mark Wahlberg, Louise Bourgoin, and Walton Goggins.

The film premiered at the Tribeca Film Festival on April 18, 2015. The film was released on DirecTV Cinema on December 3, 2015, prior to opening in a limited release on January 22, 2016, by A24.

== Plot ==
Tom, a successful Hollywood film director, is recovering from an all-night partying affair. He is still suffering from his heavy drinking and his "girlfriend" is still sleeping it off in bed as the sun rises. Tom decides to get away from it all by going to the desert in his jeep only to encounter an unexpected antagonist, who is a homicidal drifter named John "Jack" Jackson. Tom anticipates Jack's motives when Jack visits his camp at night and sends him away from his camp disarmed of his rifle and ammunition. Jack is armed with a Bowie knife he had concealed and slung on the inside of his coat. Tom manages to defend himself with a smaller retractable knife which he carries and which he is able to get out in time to overpower Jack and throw him out of the camp.

The next day, Tom is still in the desert and cannot return to L.A. because he had previously overturned in his jeep and cannot recover the disabled vehicle. He spends the night in a cave and when a figure appears in the entrance he assumes that it is Jack returning to rob him and he shoots at the figure, killing him instantly. On closer inspection it proves not to be Jack, but a patrolling police officer whom Tom has inadvertently killed. Since the rifle is the one which he took from Jack while disarming him, Tom leaves the scene with the rifle intentionally left behind in order to make it look as if Jack was the culprit. Meanwhile, Jack separately discovers the abandoned jeep in the desert the next day and manages to find a filled-out car registration form in it with Tom's name and address inside. Jack feels that with his information of Tom's misdeeds he can now return to L.A. and use the information to blackmail Tom for a few hundred thousand dollars. He starts to hitchhike back to L.A.

Tom returns to L.A. on his own not knowing anything about Jack's plans to confront him with his discovery of Tom's identity and his misdeeds in the desert. When Jack finally confronts Tom, it is Tom who tells Jack that his plan is very poorly developed and that he has in fact left evidence behind in the desert, such as Jack's rifle at the scene of the shooting, which will almost certainly convict Jack of the crime. Jack sees that he has been outwitted. Meanwhile, the police discover the dead officer left behind in the desert and begin to gather evidence. Jack and Tom must now discover which one of their stories will prevail.

Tom rejects Jack's $200,000 blackmail demand. Jack kills movie executive Norman to set up Tom as the murderer like Tom set up Jack for the policeman killing. They agree to meet back in the desert. Jack proposes they play Russian roulette. Tom grabs the gun and shoots Jack dead. Jack had all the chambers loaded with bullets. Tom sets Jack and his trailer on fire and leaves. Next day Tom kisses his little girl who had been away.

== Cast ==
- Garrett Hedlund as Thomas "Tom"
- Oscar Isaac as John "Jack" Jackson
- Mark Wahlberg as Norman
- Walton Goggins as Jim
- Louise Bourgoin as Milly
- Fran Kranz as Bob
- Dania Ramirez as Detective Beaumont
- Matt L. Jones as Louis
- Kylie Rogers as Sophie
- Oliver Cooper as Nicholas "Nick"

== Production ==
On March 22, 2012, it was announced that Atlas Independent would produce the film, while William Monahan was set to direct on his own script, also operating on producer capacity. Henceforth Pictures was set to produce the film, while Relativity International would co-finance. The film was co-produced and financed by MICA entertainments headed by Dale Armin Johnson.

=== Casting ===
On December 4, 2012, Oscar Isaac and Jason Clarke joined the cast of the film for the lead roles. On May 16, 2013, Garrett Hedlund was set to star in the film for a supporting role. On July 18, 2013, Louise Bourgoin joined the film.

On September 27, 2013, Walton Goggins also signed on as part of the cast of the film. On October 2, 2013, Fran Kranz landed a role in the film, portraying a post-production assistant to Isaac's character.

On March 24, 2014, Mark Wahlberg revealed that he had filmed a supporting role in the film along with Isaac and Hedlund - he told Collider that he would play a "small part" in the film.

=== Filming ===
In March 2012, the production of the film was set to begin in August in Southern California. By December 2012, the production was delayed until early 2013. On September 27, 2013, filming was finally underway at a location in Los Angeles and Mojave Desert.

=== Music ===
On July 10, 2014, it was announced that Andrew Hewitt would be composing the music for the film.

== Release ==
On November 7, 2013, some images from the film were released. Mojave had its world premiere at the Tribeca Film Festival on April 18, 2015. On April 24, 2015, A24 and DirecTV Cinema confirmed they had acquired U.S. distribution rights to the film. The film was released on DirecTV Cinema on December 3, 2015, prior to opening in a limited release on January 22, 2016.

== Reception ==
The film received mixed to negative reviews from critics. On Rotten Tomatoes, the film has a 32% score, based on 73 reviews, with an average rating of 4.8/10. The site's critical consensus states, "Mojave has no shortage of talent on either side of the camera; unfortunately, it amounts to little more than a frustrating missed opportunity." Metacritic reports a 41 out of 100 rating based on 23 critics, indicating "mixed or average reviews".
