= Gryll Grange =

Novel by Thomas Love Peacock

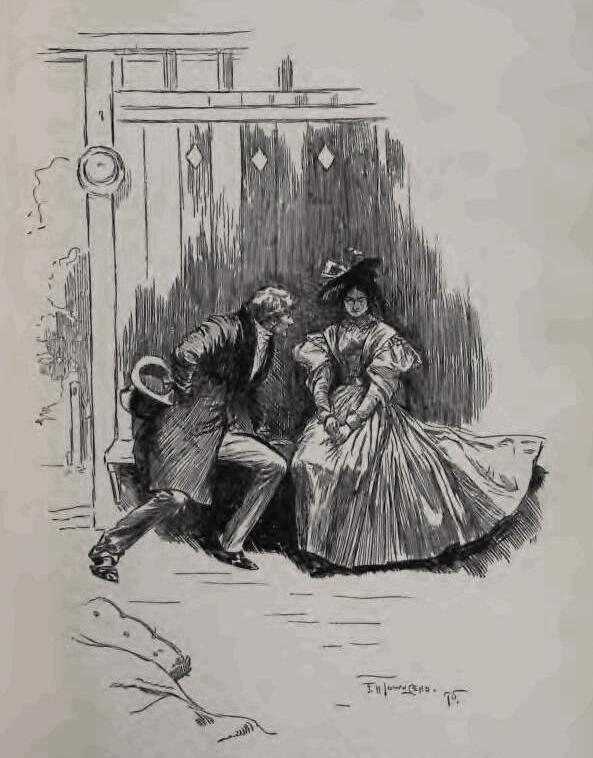
An illustration by F. H. Townsend from the 1896 edition

Gryll Grange is the seventh and final novel of Thomas Love Peacock, published in 1861.

== Overview ==
The novel first appeared in Fraser's Magazine in 1860, after Peacock's retirement from the East India Company. The exuberant humour of his former works may be wanting, but the book is notable for its use of anecdote, pointed in the author's inveterate prejudices and pugnacious hostility to every modern innovation.

The book's title turns about the belief of its owner, Gregory Gryll, 'though he found it difficult to trace the pedigree, that he was lineally descended from the ancient and illustrious Gryllus, who maintained against Ulysses the superior happiness of the life of other animals to that of the life of man.' This sapient character was one of the men whom Circe had turned into pigs and resisted being changed back. His family line had now lasted some three thousand years, but the master of Gryll Grange, not having married, was without an heir to prolong the family. Though he had adopted his niece as heir instead, she had turned down innumerable suitors. The business of the novel is how she at last comes to find a man to her taste.

== The plot ==
The novel begins with a discussion around the dinner table of Mr. Gryll, in which his friend, the genial gourmet, the Rev. Dr. Opimian, holds forth on misnomers, fish, and the contemporary fashion for lectures. Mr. Gryll suggests that they get up an Aristophanic comedy to put on show that Christmas, in which spirit-rappers bring up the shade of his supposed ancestor, Gryllus, to give them his opinion of modern times.

On a walk in the adjacent woods one morning Dr. Opimian discovers that an abandoned tower known locally as "the Duke's folly", is now inhabited. The new owner, Mr. Algernon Falconer, overhears the divine (who has a mania for quoting from the ancients) quoting a passage from Homer comparing the tower to Circe's enchanted abode. Himself a lover of classical literature, Falconer invites the divine to dine with him. Mr. Falconer, a young bachelor, is attended by seven young women, all sisters, who serve as cooks, waitresses, and music-players for him all at once. At first slightly disturbed, Opimian finds that his new friend is simply a genial eccentric who wishes to avoid the world in order not to discompose the equanimity of his mind; and who spends his days reading and contemplating "ideal beauty" in the form of a shrine to St. Catherine, a Christian martyr of the third century.

Opimian repeats his visit to Mr. Falconer several times, and at one point encounters a local farmer's son, Harry Hedgegrow, who is in love with one of the seven sisters of the tower. When, on a later visit, a carriage bearing Mr. Gryll and his young daughter Morgana is hit by lightning near the tower, Falconer invites them in, and first forms Morgana's acquaintance. After a much prolonged stay at the tower while the latter is recovering, Gryll invites his host to stay with him during Christmas and be present at the comedy.

At Gryll Grange (Mr. Gryll's estate) a wide and pleasant circle has gathered for the Christmas celebrations. Aside from the Grylls, Dr. Opimian, and Falconer, are the slightly ludicrous but amiable lord Curryfin, who is a dabbler in all kinds of science and technology, Miss Niphet, and the spinster Miss Illex. Lord Curryfin (who has made his name as a lecturer on fish) is in search of matrimony, and initially courts Morgana. However, she does not strongly encourage him, and he begins to find himself attracted to Alice Niphet (who accidentally manifests her own interest in him when he endangers his life during the holiday season in various shenanigans, such as experimenting on a new type of sail, and undertaking to tame a stubborn horse). Meanwhile, Falconer admits to himself that he has fallen in love with Morgana, but hesitates to propose to her out of unwillingness to break up his congenial household with the seven sisters at the tower.

Harry Hedgeworth pursues his suit to Dorothy the "Vestal" (as the seven sisters are called throughout the novel) of his choice, and six of his friends each fall in love with another of the girls. He presents this fact to Mr. Opimian, who undertakes to forward the loves of Morgana and Falconer so the seven sisters can marry. Morgana, seeing Falconer's hesitation, gives him an ultimatum whereby she hints he must either declare his love 28 days thence, or renounce her forever. At the same time, seeing Lord Curryfin and Alice Niphet's mutual attraction, she forces the former (on the claim of his having been her suitor) to declare himself to Miss Niphet. He accedes, and is accepted.

The Aristophanic comedy is finally performed; Gryllus is called up by Circe at the behest of the spirit-rappers; the spirit-rappers ask Gryllus his opinion of modern times, but he is dismissive of engine-ships, locomotives and everything they can tell him of; a competitive examination (a practice begun in Peacock's time, which he strongly opposed) is arranged for various characters, who are all declared unfit by the examiners for failing to answer some irrelevant questions. It is then revealed that they are Hannibal, Oliver Cromwell, and Richard the Lion-Heart. The last chases the examiners away with his battle-axe.

At the close of four times seven days Falconer proposes to Morgana. Dr. Opimian having told him of the mutual love of the seven sisters and Harry and his friends, his fears on that score have been removed. The novel ends at a ceremony where all nine marriages are celebrated.
