= Maid Marian (novella) =

1822 novel by Thomas Love Peacock

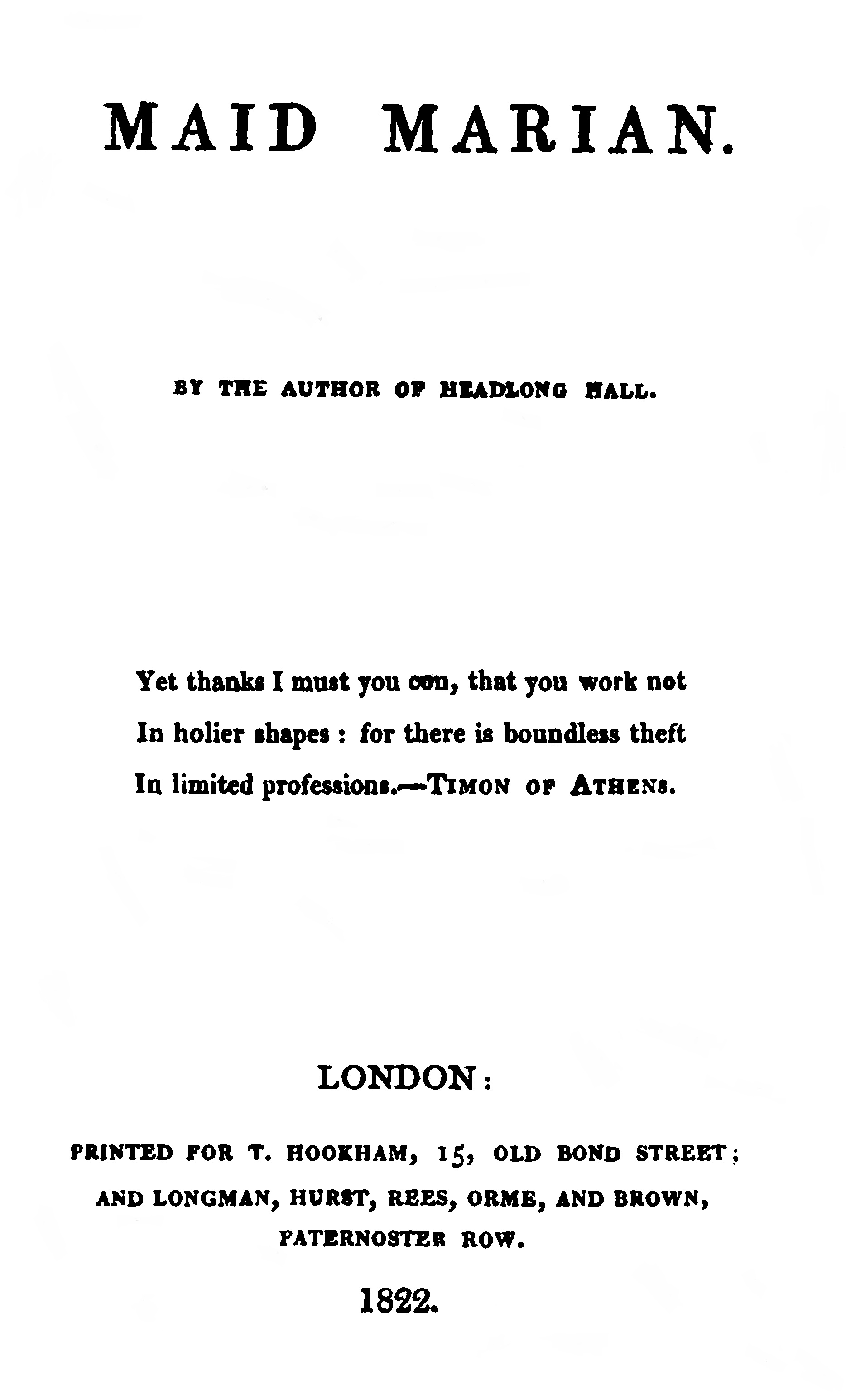
First edition title page

Maid Marian is a novella by Thomas Love Peacock, his fourth long work of fiction, published in 1822.

Peacock wrote all but the last three chapters of Maid Marian at Marlow in 1818. He wrote to Percy Bysshe Shelley that he did not find "this brilliant summer", of 1818, "very favourable to intellectual exertion" but before it was quite over "rivers, castles, forests, abbeys, monks, maids, kings, and banditti were all dancing before me like a masked ball". However, in 1819 Peacock was recruited to the East India Company where his official duties delayed the completion and publication of the novella until 1822. As a result of the delay, it was taken for an imitation of Ivanhoe although its composition had, in fact, preceded Scott's novel. It was soon dramatised with great success by James Planché, and was translated into French and German.
