= John Pilfold =

Royal Navy officer (1769–1834)

Captain John Pilfold
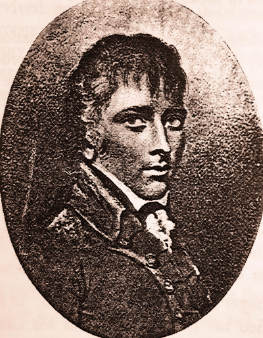
- Born: before 20 January 1769; Horsham, Sussex, England
- Died: 12 July 1834 (aged 65); Stonehouse, Devon, England
- Resting place: St George's Church, Plymouth, England
- Occupation: Naval Captain
- Employer: Royal Navy
- Relatives: Percy Bysshe Shelley (nephew), Thomas Medwin (cousin removed)

Captain John Pilfold CB (before 20 January 1769 – 12 July 1834) was an officer of the Royal Navy whose solid naval career during the French Revolutionary and Napoleonic Wars was most noted for his command of the ship of the line HMS Ajax in Nelson's division at the battle of Trafalgar whilst only a lieutenant.

== Family background ==
John Pilfold's father, Charles Pilfold (1726–1790), was described as a "yeoman" and not a "gent" in his marriage registration, indicating the Pilfolds were not an arms-bearing family but freehold proprietors, although on a modest scale. Pilfold's uncle, Richard Pilfold (1677–1748), inherited Baylings Farm at Warnham, which the family had owned since the 16th century.

When John Pilford was ten, his mother died and two years later, he joined the Royal Navy. John Pilfold's older brother Charles inherited the farm and later became an apprentice butcher at the age of 17. Charles later preceded John and became acting Lieutenant in the Navy serving under Lord Nelson. In 1782, he met Nelson again in New York. Soon, he was promoted to full Lieutenant. On 17 December 1791, Charles made his last voyage to China. He died on 28 August 1792, on Oceana. The cause of death was unknown.

== Naval career ==
John Pilfold followed the usual method of introduction to the Royal Navy of the day, joining a ship aged 13 and slowly learning his trade as a midshipman in HMS Crown under the capable guidance of William Cornwallis. In October 1788 Pilfold was promoted to Midshipman. Later that month, he went to sea under the command of Sir William Cornwallis to the East Indies, returning in May 1792. Arriving home, Pilfold found his father had died in 1790 and that his estate, Effingham East Court Manor, had been sold.

The following year, France declared war on England.

Pilfold distinguished himself in the battle of the Glorious First of June in 1794, and was specially recommended by his dying captain John Harvey of HMS Brunswick for his bravery and competence.

This brought him to the attention of Admiral Howe, who summoned him to his flagship, HMS Queen Charlotte. Howe promoted him to Lieutenant and assigned to HMS Russell. He was again heavily engaged with the enemy on 23 June 1795, when he was aboard during the battle of Groix in which three enemy ships were taken. Russell lost three men killed and ten were wounded.

As a reward, he was posted to the 18-gun sloop HMS Kingfisher and made some money from prizes captured during operations off the Spanish and Portuguese coasts, sailing from Lisbon. He was also instrumental in preventing a local outbreak of mutiny following the larger rebellions at home at Spithead and the Nore in 1797. In 1798, he was transferred to another big ship, the 74-gun HMS Impetueux; he gained some notoriety in 1800 by leading a raiding party into the Morbihan River and destroying a dozen French ships and wrecking port facilities in the river. A notorious and wealthy first lieutenant, Pilfold met and married Mary Anne Horner on 20 June 1803 during the Peace of Amiens, but was back aboard ship in 1803, moving from HMS Hindostan to HMS Dragon and from there to the Ajax, which was then commanded by Captain William Brown.

Ajax was engaged at the battle of Cape Finisterre. Brown was embroiled in the scandal which followed and resulted in the court martial of the admiral in charge, Sir Robert Calder. Called home to give evidence at the trial, Brown placed Pilfold in charge of the Ajax, which joined Nelson's fleet during the blockade of Cádiz. On 21 October, Ajax was sixth in Nelson's line for the Battle of Trafalgar and was heavily engaged with the Intrépide and Argonauta, fighting them both to a standstill and remarkably only suffering two dead and nine wounded during the whole engagement. Pilfold returned home to rapturous praise in December 1805. Because the family seat, East Court Manor in Effingham, Surrey had been sold, he spent a great deal of time at Marshalls Manor, in Cuckfield, West Sussex. He was promoted to Post Captain at Christmas of that year, followed over the next ten years by further rewards, including his own coat of arms and initiation into the Order of the Bath on 4 June 1815.

=== After retirement ===
Pilfold, however, never again commanded at sea, as a ship was not provided for him, and he gradually gave up ambitions of further promotion and retired in 1815. In 1824 he left Sussex and lived in Wales and Devon with his family. He was Captain of the Ordinary at Plymouth, from April 1828 to April 1831.

He died in 1834, two years after his wife and three years after a debilitating stroke which left him "quite childish". He was buried at St George's Church, Plymouth, but the churchyard containing his tombstone was destroyed by German bombers in the Blitz in 1941. After the church was demolished "the remains of those buried there were removed and re-interred at Efford Cemetery" according to one source, which adds that "there is no record of Captain Pilfold’s remains being included".

== Private life ==
Pinfold had married in 1803 and made his home in Horsham. He and Mary Ann had two daughters and one of them attended a school owned and run by Elizabeth Hitchener. As a result Hitchener met Pinfold's nephew, the poet Percy Bysshe Shelley. Hitchener and Shelley discovered that they were soul mates. Hitchener went live with Shelley and his wife. Pilfold and his wife had joined Hitchener's father in advising against this as it would damage her reputation. It did.

== Biography ==
- The Trafalgar Captains, Colin White and the 1805 Club, Chatham Publishing, London, 2005, ISBN 1-86176-247-X
- The Life and Times of Captain John Pilfold, Hawkins, Desmond, A Horsham Museum Society Monograph, 1998

== Arms ==
Coat of arms of John Pilfold

Motto
Audaces Fortuna Juvat
Orders
Order of the Bath
