= Headlong Hall =

Novella by Thomas Love Peacock

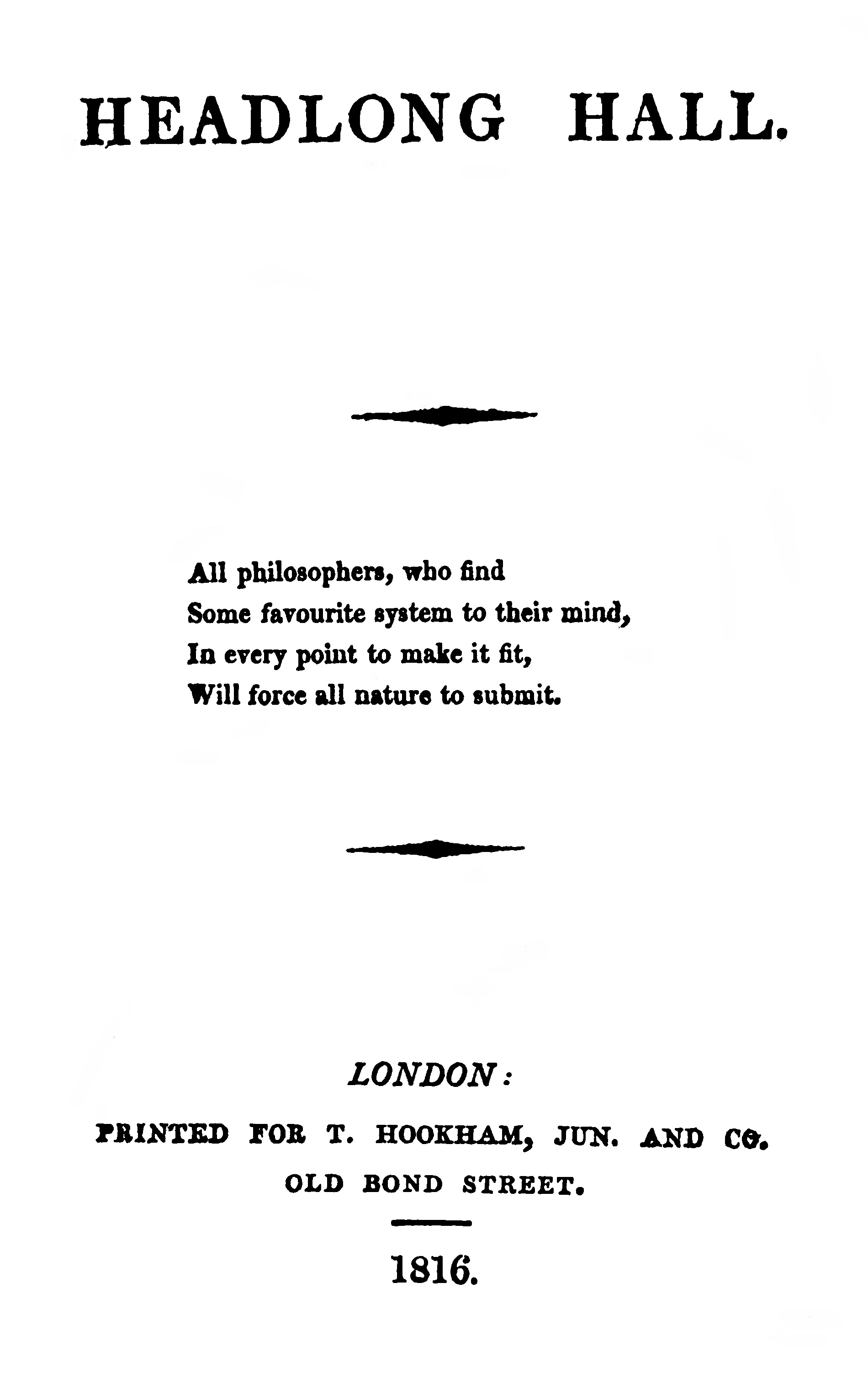
First edition title page

Headlong Hall is a novella by Thomas Love Peacock, his first long work of fiction, written in 1815 and published in 1816.

As in his later novel Crotchet Castle, Peacock assembles a group of eccentrics, each with a single monomaniacal obsession, and derives humour and social satire from their various interactions and conversations. The setting is the country estate of Squire Harry Headlong Ap-Rhaiader, Esq., in Wales.

== Plot ==
Four visitors arrive at Headlong Hall: "Mr. Foster, the perfectibilian; Mr. Escot, the deteriorationist; Mr. Jenkins, the statu-quoite; and the Reverend Doctor Gaster, who though of course neither a philosopher nor a man of taste, had so won the Squire's fancy by a learned dissertation on the art of stuffing a turkey, that he concluded no Christmas party would be complete without him." At the Hall, they find further guests, including phrenologist Mr. Cranium, philosopher Mr. Panscope, amateur musician Mr. Chromatic, and Miss Philomela Poppyseed, a popular novelist. Squire Headlong leads the throng through a series of dinners and Christmas celebrations, although the chief focus of the story is the running thread of conversation between the various exponents of their respective views. By the final morning of the party, four couples have become engaged, and Reverend Gaster performs a wedding ceremony for them. The guests disperse, promising to meet again in summer.

== Background ==
Headlong Hall was influenced by two unpublished plays written by Thomas Love Peacock between 1810 and 1815. The Dilettanti was a farce involving several characters who aim to become fashionable members of society. The musician Mr Chromatic is an early version of the Mr Cornelius Chromatic who appears in Headlong Hall, while Mr Shadow, a painter, likewise prefigures Sir Patrick O'Prism. Another unpublished play, The Three Doctors, was a musical which was partially reincorporated into his later novella; in particular, the character of Marmaduke Milestone appears in both works.

== Neologisms ==
As part of Mr. Cranium the phrenologist's announcement of his lecture, the author coins the words osteosarchaematosplanchnochondroneuromuelous and osseocarnisanguineoviscericartilaginonervomedullary. They refer to the structure of the human body; they are adjectives compounded by stringing together classical terms that describe the body, using ancient Greek terms for the first word and Latin for the second.
