= Melincourt (novel) =

1817 novel by Thomas Love Peacock

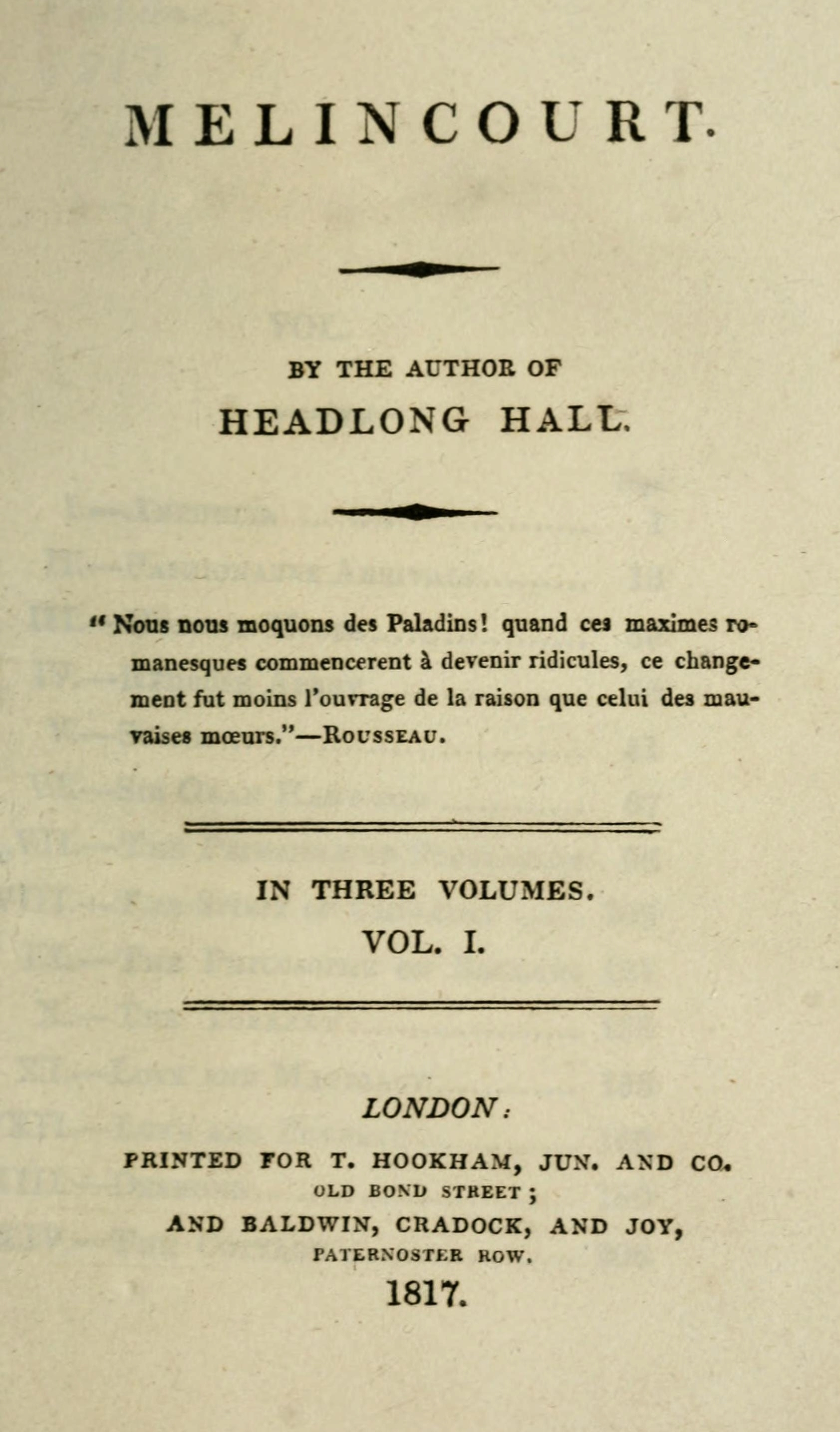
First edition title page

Melincourt is the second novel of Thomas Love Peacock, published in 1817. It is based on the "idea of an orang-outang mimicking humanity" (see James Burnett, Lord Monboddo). An orangutan called Sir Oran Haut-ton is put forward as a candidate for election as a Member of Parliament.

The heroine, Anthelia, is said to have been inspired by Peacock's friendship with Justina Jeffreys, a mixed-race woman from Jamaica who had grown up as the ward of Edward Scott, Bodtalog.
