= Production write-through contract =

Film industry contract

A production write-through contract is an arrangement, specific to the film industry, where a screenwriter enters into a commercial agreement with a studio that guarantees the screenwriter the right to complete the necessary rewrites of the screenplay. The screenwriter will be on the set throughout the production of the film, and will do the rewrites that a production rewriter would otherwise do.
