= Penguin Popular Classics =

Series of paperback editions

Cover illustrations

Penguin Popular Classics, issued in 1994, are paperback editions of texts under the Classics imprints. They were created as a response to Wordsworth Classics, which functioned as a competitive catalog of very cheap reprints that emulated Penguin by using black as its signature colour for book covers. The series started with editions featuring hand-painted motifs commissioned from various independent painters, but subsequently switched to a uniform bright green colour in 2007. Penguin Books dropped Popular Classics in 2013.

== Books ==
=== Printed with individual covers ===
Title	Author	Release date	Cover artist
A Child's Garden of Verses	Robert Louis Stevenson	2005	
A Little Princess	Frances Hodgson Burnett	1996	
A Midsummer Night's Dream	William Shakespeare	2007	
A Pair of Blue Eyes	Thomas Hardy	1994	Gustav Vermehren
A Portrait of the Artist as a Young Man	James Joyce	1996	Malcolm Drummond
A Study in Scarlet	Arthur Conan Doyle	1996	
A Tale of Two Cities	Charles Dickens	1994	
A Woman of No Importance	Oscar Wilde	1996	Albert Chevallier Tayler (Tea In The Garden)
Adam Bede	George Eliot	1994	William Edward Millner
Aesop's Fables	Aesop	1996	
Agnes Grey	Anne Brontë	1994	
Alice's Adventures in Wonderland	Lewis Carroll	1994	
Allan Quatermain	H. Rider Haggard	1995	
Antony and Cleopatra	William Shakespeare	1994	
Arabian Nights		1997	Edmund Dulac
Around the World in Eighty Days	Jules Verne	1994	
As You Like It	William Shakespeare	2007	Arthur Rackham
Barchester Towers	Anthony Trollope	1994	Francis Wheatley
Billy Budd, Sailor	Herman Melville	1995	
Black Beauty	Anna Sewell	1994	John Frederick Herring Sr.
Bleak House	Charles Dickens	1994	George Elgar Hicks
Candide	Voltaire	2001	Charles-Amédée-Philippe van Loo
Captains Courageous	Rudyard Kipling	1995	
Confessions of an English Opium-Eater	Thomas De Quincey	1997	
Cousin Phillis	Elizabeth Gaskell	1995	
Cranford	Elizabeth Gaskell	2002	
Crime and Punishment	Fyodor Dostoevsky	2007	
Daisy Miller	Henry James	1995	
David Copperfield	Charles Dickens	1994	
Doctor Thorne	Anthony Trollope	1994	
Dr Jekyll and Mr Hyde	Robert Louis Stevenson	1994	Jean Béraud (The Private Conversation)
Dracula	Bram Stoker	1994	Still from Dracula (1931)
Dubliners	James Joyce	1996	Hamid Mehrnia (Evening Street Scene)
Early Twentieth-Century Poetry		1996	
Eighteenth-Century Poetry		1996	
Emma	Jane Austen	1994	Pieter Christoffel Wonder
Ethan Frome	Edith Wharton	1995	
Fairy Tales	Hans Christian Andersen	1994	
Fanny Hill or Memoirs of a Woman of Pleasure	John Cleland	1994	
Far From The Madding Crowd	Thomas Hardy	1994	Details from Bringing in the Sheep by Adolf Ernst Meissner
Fathers and Sons	Ivan Turgenev	1997	
Father Brown Stories	G. K. Chesterton	1994	
Five Children and It	E. Nesbit	1995	
Framley Parsonage	Anthony Trollope	1994	
Frankenstein	Mary Shelley	1994	Thomas Eakins (Gross Clinic)
Ghost Stories	M. R. James	1994	
Good Wives	Louisa May Alcott	1995	Ellen Jolin (Picking Flowers)
Great Expectations	Charles Dickens	1994	George Elgar Hicks
Greenmantle	John Buchan	2000	
Greyfriars Bobby	Eleanor Atkinson	2005	Robert Morley (Will he come back?)
Grimms' Fairy Tales	Brothers Grimm	1996	Arthur Rackham
Gulliver's Travels	Jonathan Swift	1994	
Guys and Dolls and Other Stories	Damon Runyon	1997	
Hamlet	William Shakespeare	2001	
Hard Times	Charles Dickens	1994	Sir Luke Fildes (Applicants for Admission to a Casual Ward)
Heart of Darkness	Joseph Conrad	1994	
Heidi	Johanna Spyri	1995	Alexandra Kolganova (Summer)
Henry V	William Shakespeare	1994	
His Last Bow	Arthur Conan Doyle	1997	
Ivanhoe	Walter Scott	1994	Leo Coguiet (Rebecca and Brian de Bois-Guilbert)
Jane Eyre	Charlotte Brontë	1994	Daniel Pasmore (Mending the Tapestry)
Journey to the Centre of the Earth	Jules Verne	1994	Charles Mottram
Jude the Obscure	Thomas Hardy	1994	Napoleone Nani
Julius Caesar	William Shakespeare	1995	
Just So Stories	Rudyard Kipling	1994	Hendrik Frans van Lint
Kidnapped	Robert Louis Stevenson	1994	
Kim	Rudyard Kipling	1994	
King Lear	William Shakespeare	1994	
King Solomon's Mines	H. Rider Haggard	1994	
Lady Chatterley's Lover	D. H. Lawrence	1997	Detail from Young Woman by Delphin Enjolras
Lady Windermere's Fan	Oscar Wilde	2011	
Les Misérables	Victor Hugo	1998	
Little Dorrit	Charles Dickens	1994	
Little Lord Fauntleroy	Frances Hodgson Burnett	1995	
Little Women	Louisa May Alcott	1994	Harold Copping
Lord Arthur Savile's Crime and Other Stories	Oscar Wilde	1994	Gustave Bourgain (Louis Signorino)
Lord Jim	Joseph Conrad	1994	Eugène Isabey
Lorna Doone	R. D. Blackmore	1994	
Macbeth	William Shakespeare	1994	
Madame Bovary	Gustave Flaubert	1995	
Mansfield Park	Jane Austen	1994	Detail from Thorp Perrow, Yorkshire, photographed by Bridgeman Art Library
Martin Chuzzlewit	Charles Dickens	1994	
Mary Barton	Elizabeth Gaskell	1994	
Measure for Measure	William Shakespeare	2001	
Meditations	Marcus Aurelius	1997	
Middlemarch	George Eliot	1994	
Moby Dick	Herman Melville	1994	Cornelius Krieghoff
Moll Flanders	Daniel Defoe	1994	William Hogarth
Moonfleet	J. Meade Falkner	1994	
Mr Standfast	John Buchan	1997	
Mrs Dalloway	Virginia Woolf	1996	
Much Ado About Nothing	William Shakespeare	1997	Detail from Dogberry's Charge to the Watch by Henry Stacy Marks
Nicholas Nickleby	Charles Dickens	1994	Bridge Over the Street at Mansion House
North and South	Elizabeth Gaskell	2007	
Northanger Abbey	Jane Austen	1994	George Cruikshank
Nostromo	Joseph Conrad	1994	Ferdinand Gueldry
Oliver Twist	Charles Dickens	1994	Thomas Shotter Boys
Orlando	Virginia Woolf	1998	
Othello	William Shakespeare	2007	Robert Alexander Hillingford
Paradise Lost	John Milton	1996	
Persuasion	Jane Austen	1994	John Claude Nattes
Peter Pan	J. M. Barrie	1995	
Plain Tales from the Hills	Rudyard Kipling	1994	
Poetry of the Romantics		2000	
Pride and Prejudice	Jane Austen	1994	George Shepherd
Puck of Pook's Hill	Rudyard Kipling	1995	
Rob Roy	Walter Scott	1995	
Robin Hood		1997	
Robinson Crusoe	Daniel Defoe	2006	
Romeo and Juliet	William Shakespeare	1994	
Scottish Folk And Fairy Tales		1994	Arthur Rackham (Illustration for the Scots ballad "Clerk Colvill")
Selected Poems	John Keats	1996	
Selected Poems	Robert Burns	1996	
Selected Poems	Walt Whitman	1996	Currier and Ives (Staten island and the Narrows)
Selected Poems	William Blake	1996	
Selected Poems	William Wordsworth	1996	
Selected Short Stories	Guy de Maupassant	1995	
Selected Tales	Edgar Allan Poe	1994	Arthur Rackham (The Tales of Edgar Allan Poe)
Sense And Sensibility	Jane Austen	1994	
Seventeenth-Century Poetry		1996	
She	H. Rider Haggard	1994	William James Muller
Shirley	Charlotte Brontë	1994	J. M. W. Turner
Silas Marner	George Eliot	2002	
Sixteenth-Century Poetry		1996	
Sons and Lovers	D. H. Lawrence	2007	Léon Augustin Lhermitte
Spirits of the Dead: Tales and Poems	Edgar Allan Poe	1997	
Tales from Shakespeare	Charles and Mary Lamb	1995	
Tender is the Night	F. Scott Fitzgerald	1997	Delphin Enjolras
Tess of the d'Urbervilles	Thomas Hardy	1994	Henry John King
The Adventures of Huckleberry Finn	Mark Twain	1994	Detail from Travels into the Interior of North America by Karl Bodmer
The Adventures of Sherlock Holmes	Arthur Conan Doyle	1994	John Sutton
The Adventures of Tom Sawyer	Mark Twain	1994	Detail from Travels into the Interior of North America by Karl Bodmer
The Age of Innocence	Edith Wharton	1996	John Lavery
The Ambassadors	Henry James	1994	
The American	Henry James	2002	
The Aspern Papers	Henry James	1994	Rudolf Konopa
The Best of Saki	Saki	1994	Robert Pichenot
The Black Arrow	Robert Louis Stevenson	1995	At Eglinton, Lord of the Tournament photographed by Bridgeman Art Library
The Book of Nonsense and Nonsense Songs	Edward Lear	1996	
The Canterbury Tales	Geoffrey Chaucer	1996	
The Children of the New Forest	Frederick Marryat	1995	
The Christmas Books	Charles Dickens	1996	Arthur Rackham (Scrooge and the Ghost of Christmas Past)
The Coral Island	R. M. Ballantyne	1995	Henry Scott Tuke
The Diary of a Nobody	George and Weedon Grossmith	1995	
The Diamond as Big as the Ritz and Other Stories	F. Scott Fitzgerald	1996	
The Europeans	Henry James	1995	
The Golden Treasury	Francis Turner Palgrave	1994	
The Great Gatsby	F. Scott Fitzgerald	1994	Delphin Enjolras (The Evening)
The Happy Prince and Other Stories	Oscar Wilde	1994	
The Hound of the Baskervilles	Arthur Conan Doyle	1996	Neil Reed
The Hunchback of Notre-Dame	Victor Hugo	2011	Thomas Shotter Boys (The Cathedral of Notre Dame)
The Importance of Being Earnest	Oscar Wilde	2007	Louise Abbema (The Luncheon in the Conservatory)
The Jungle Books	Rudyard Kipling	1994	Thomas Baines
The Last of the Mohicans	James Fenimore Cooper	1994	
The Man in the Iron Mask	Alexandre Dumas	1998	
The Mayor Of Casterbridge	Thomas Hardy	1994	Albert Chevallier Tayler
The Merchant of Venice	William Shakespeare	2001	
The Mill on the Floss	George Eliot	1994	Francis Danby (Disappointed Love)
The Moonstone	Wilkie Collins	2011	
The Phantom of the Opera	Gaston Leroux	1995	James Pryde
The Pickwick Papers	Charles Dickens	1994	Charles Green
The Picture of Dorian Gray	Oscar Wilde	1994	Detail from Collector of Coins by Vilhelm Hammershøi
The Portrait of a Lady	Henry James	1997	
The Prisoner of Zenda	Anthony Hope	2002	
The Professor	Charlotte Brontë	1995	George Pyne (The Hall of Christ Church Oxford)
The Railway Children	E. Nesbit	1995	
The Rainbow	D. H. Lawrence	2002	
The Red Badge of Courage	Stephen Crane	1994	
The Return of the Native	Thomas Hardy	1994	
The Riddle of the Sands	Erskine Childers	2002	Holger Drachmann
The Scarlet Letter	Nathaniel Hawthorne	1994	Georges de La Tour
The Secret Agent	Joseph Conrad	1994	
The Secret Garden	Frances Hodgson Burnett	2007	
The Small House at Allington	Anthony Trollope	1995	
The Swiss Family Robinson	Johann David Wyss	1994	
The Tempest	William Shakespeare	2001	
The Tenant of Wildfell Hall	Anne Brontë	1994	Waller Hugh Paton
The Thirty-Nine Steps	John Buchan	1994	
The Trumpet-Major	Thomas Hardy	2000	
The Turn of the Screw	Henry James	1994	Atkinson Grimshaw
The Virgin and the Gypsy	D. H. Lawrence	1997	
The Warden	Anthony Trollope	1994	
The Water Babies	Charles Kingsley	1995	
The Way of All Flesh	Samuel Butler	1995	Camille Pissarro
The Wind in the Willows	Kenneth Grahame	1994	
The Woman in White	Wilkie Collins	2007	John Atkinson Grimshaw
The Wonderful Wizard of Oz	L. Frank Baum	2007	
The Woodlanders	Thomas Hardy	1994	
Three Men in a Boat	Jerome K. Jerome	2007	Robert McIntyre
Three Men on the Bummel	Jerome K. Jerome	1994	Henry Alken
Through the Looking Glass	Lewis Carroll	2007	John Tenniel
To the Lighthouse	Virginia Woolf	1996	
Tom Brown's Schooldays	Thomas Hughes	1997	
Tom Jones	Henry Fielding	1994	William Hogarth
Treasure Island	Robert Louis Stevenson	1994	Konstantinos Volanakis
Twelfth Night	William Shakespeare	2001	
Twenty Thousand Leagues Under the Seas	Jules Verne	1994	
Under the Greenwood Tree	Thomas Hardy	1994	
Vanity Fair	William Makepeace Thackeray	1994	William Frederick Witherington (Fête in Petworth Park)
Victorian Poetry		2000	
Victory	Joseph Conrad	1994	
Villette	Charlotte Brontë	2002	
War and Peace	Leo Tolstoy	2001	Detail from Napoleon on a Grey Horse by Joseph-Louis-Hippolyte Bellange
Washington Square	Henry James	1995	
Waverley	Walter Scott	1994	
What Katy Did	Susan Coolidge	1997	
White Fang and The Call of the Wild	Jack London	1994	
Women in Love	D. H. Lawrence	1996	Detail from the painting Holidays, photographed by Bridgeman Art Library
Wuthering Heights	Emily Brontë	1994	Julian Rossi Ashton

=== Printed with uniform bright green colour ===
Title	Author	Release date
Candide	Voltaire	2001
Crime and Punishment	Fyodor Dostoyevsky	1997
David Copperfield	Charles Dickens	
Dubliners	James Joyce	1996
Emma	Jane Austen	1994
Frankenstein	Mary Shelley	?
Hamlet	William Shakespeare	2001
Jane Eyre	Charlotte Brontë	1994
Pride and Prejudice	Jane Austen	1994
Selected Tales	Edgar Allan Poe	
The Adventures of Tom Sawyer	Mark Twain	1994
The Strange Case of Dr Jekyll and Mr Hyde	Robert Louis Stevenson	1994
Wuthering Heights	Emily Brontë	1994
