= Penguin English Library =

The Penguin English Library is an imprint of Penguin Books. The series was first created in 1963 as a 'sister series' to the Penguin Classics series, providing critical editions of English classics; at that point in time, the Classics label was reserved for works translated into English (for example, Juvenal's Sixteen Satires). The English Library was merged into the Classics stable in the mid 1980s, and all titles hitherto published in the Library were reissued as Classics.

The imprint was resurrected in 2012 for a new series of titles. The present English Library no longer seeks to provide critical editions; the focus is now 'on the beauty and elegance of the book'.

== History ==
=== 1963 to 1986 ===
The Penguin English Library aimed to publish 'a comprehensive range of the literary masterpieces which have appeared in the English language since the 15th century'. All texts in the Library were published with an introduction and explanatory notes written and compiled by an editor; some with a bibliography as well. Editors were also required to provide 'authoritative texts', using their own judgement in printing one, or in some cases creating their own. The series was recognisable chiefly by its distinctive orange spine.

Most, if not all, titles were reprinted as Penguin Classics following the merger of the two imprints in the mid 1980s. Some of these editions were superseded in the 1990s or later, while some continue to be reprinted today as Classics. Additionally, the introductions to some titles survive in present-day Penguin Classics as appendices – for example, Tony Tanner's introduction to Mansfield Park.

=== 2012 to present ===
The imprint was resurrected in name, though not so much in spirit, in 2012. Texts published in the series no longer include critical apparatus; they instead feature an essay by a notable literary figure, usually excerpted from prior work - for example, the essays of Harold Bloom, V. S. Pritchett and John Sutherland have been featured. A portrait or photograph of the author remains printed on the inside of the front cover. The focus is now on cover art, with each title designed by Coralie Bickford-Smith.

== List of English Library titles ==
This is an incomplete list of the titles in the Penguin English Library:

=== 1963 to 1986 ===
All titles listed below are assumed to have lists of further reading appended and/or are no longer in print having been superseded by new editions, unless stated.

Author	Editor	Title	Series no.	Notes
Matthew Arnold	P. J. Keating	Selected Prose	58	Still in print as a Penguin Classic titled Culture and Anarchy and Other Selected Prose (2015).
John Aubrey	Oliver Lawson Dick	Aubrey's Brief Lives	79	
Jane Austen	Ronald Blythe	Emma	10	
Jane Austen	Margaret Drabble	Lady Susan/The Watsons/Sanditon	102	
Jane Austen	Tony Tanner	Mansfield Park	16	Tanner's introduction to the novel is reprinted as an appendix in the 2003 Penguin Classics edition.
Jane Austen	Anne Henry Ehrenpreis	Northanger Abbey	74	Does not include a bibliography.
Jane Austen	D. W. Harding	Persuasion	5	
Jane Austen	Tony Tanner	Pride and Prejudice	72	
Jane Austen	Tony Tanner	Sense and Sensibility	47	
James Boswell	Christopher Hibbert	The Life of Samuel Johnson	116	
Charlotte Brontë	Q. D. Leavis	Jane Eyre	11	
Charlotte Brontë	Andrew and Judith Hook	Shirley	95	
Charlotte Brontë	Tony Tanner (introduction); Mark Lilly	Villette	118	
Emily Brontë	David Daiches	Wuthering Heights	1	
Thomas Browne	C. A. Patrides	The Major Works	109	
Edmund Burke	Conor Cruise O'Brien	Reflections on the Revolution in France	Unknown	Still in print as a Penguin Classic.
John Bunyan	Roger Sharrock	The Pilgrim's Progress	4	Reprinted with revisions as a Penguin Classic in 1987.
Samuel Butler	Peter Mudford	Erewhon	57	
Samuel Butler	Richard Hoggart (introduction); James Cochrane	The Way of All Flesh	12	
Lord Byron	Peter Gunn	Selected Prose	80	
Thomas Carlyle	Alan Shelston	Selected Writings	65	
Marcus Clarke	Stephen Murray-Smith	His Natural Life	51	
William Cobbett	George Woodcock	Rural Rides	23	
Wilkie Collins	J. I. M. Stewart	The Moonstone	14	
Wilkie Collins	Julian Symons	The Woman in White	96	
Daniel Defoe	Anthony Burgess (introduction); Christopher Bristow	A Journal of the Plague Year	15	
Daniel Defoe	Pat Rogers	A Tour Through the Whole Island of Great Britain	66	
Daniel Defoe	Juliet Mitchell	Moll Flanders	107	
Daniel Defoe	Angus Ross	Robinson Crusoe	7	
Thomas De Quincey	Alethea Hayter	Confessions of an English Opium Eater	61	
Thomas De Quincey	David Wright	Recollections of the Lakes and the Lake Poets	56	
Charles Dickens	George Woodcock	A Tale of Two Cities	54	
Charles Dickens	John S. Whitley; Arnold Goldman	American Notes for General Circulation	77	
Charles Dickens	Gordon Spence	Barnaby Rudge	90	
Charles Dickens	J. Hillis Miller (introduction); Norman Page	Bleak House	63	
Charles Dickens	Trevor Blount	David Copperfield	8	
Charles Dickens	Raymond Williams (introduction); Peter Fairclough	Dombey and Son	48	
Charles Dickens	Angus Calder	Great Expectations	3	
Charles Dickens	David Craig	Hard Times	42	
Charles Dickens	John Holloway	Little Dorrit	25	
Charles Dickens	P. N. Furbank	Martin Chuzzlewit	31	
Charles Dickens	Michael Slater	Nicholas Nickleby	113	
Charles Dickens	Angus Wilson (introduction); Peter Fairclough	Oliver Twist	17	
Charles Dickens	Stephen Gill	Our Mutual Friend	60	
Charles Dickens	Deborah A. Thomas	Selected Short Fiction	103	
Charles Dickens	Michael Slater	The Christmas Books, Volume 1 (A Christmas Carol/The Chimes)	68	
Charles Dickens	Michael Slater	The Christmas Books, Volume 2 (The Cricket on the Hearth/The Battle of Life/The Haunted Man)	69	
Charles Dickens	Angus Wilson (introduction); Arthur J. Cox	The Mystery of Edwin Drood	92	
Charles Dickens	Malcolm Andrews (introduction); Angus Easson	The Old Curiosity Shop	75	
Charles Dickens	Robert Patten	The Pickwick Papers	78	
Benjamin Disraeli	Thom Braun	Coningsby	192	
Benjamin Disraeli	Thom Braun (text and notes); Rab Butler (introduction)	Sybil; or, The Two Nations	134	
George Eliot	Unknown	Adam Bede	121	
George Eliot	Barbara Hardy	Daniel Deronda	20	
George Eliot	Peter Coveney	Felix Holt	84	
George Eliot	W. J. Harvey	Middlemarch	2	
George Eliot	A. S. Byatt	Mill on the Floss	120	
George Eliot	Andrew Sanders	Romola	139	
George Eliot	David Lodge	Scenes of Clerical Life	87	
George Eliot	Q. D. Leavis	Silas Marner	30	
Henry Fielding	R. F. Brissenden	Joseph Andrews	114	
Henry Fielding	R. P. C. Mutter	Tom Jones	9	
John Ford	Stephen Gill	Three Plays ('Tis Pity She's a Whore/The Broken Heart/Perkin Warbeck)	59	
Elizabeth Gaskell	Peter Keating	Cranford/Cousin Phillis	104	
Elizabeth Gaskell	Stephen Gill	Mary Barton	53	
Elizabeth Gaskell	Dorothy Collin; Martin Dodsworth	North and South	55	
Elizabeth Gaskell	Alan Shelston	The Life of Charlotte Brontë	99	
Elizabeth Gaskell	Frank Glover Smith	Wives and Daughters	46	
George Gissing	Bernard Bergonzi	New Grub Street	32	
Richard Hakluyt	Jack Beeching	Voyages and Discoveries	73	
Thomas Hardy	C. H. Sisson	Jude the Obscure	131	
Thomas Hardy	Susan Hill	The Distracted Preacher and Other Tales	124	
Thomas Hardy	Ronald Blythe	Far from the Madding Crowd	126	
Thomas Hardy	Martin Seymour-Smith	The Mayor of Casterbridge	125	
Thomas Hardy	George Woodcock	The Return of the Native	122	
Thomas Hardy	A. Alvarez (introduction); David Skilton (editor)	Tess of the D'Urbervilles	135	
Thomas Hardy	David Wright	Under the Greenwood Tree	123	
William Hazlitt	Ronald Blythe	Selected Writings	50	
Nathaniel Hawthorne	Thomas E. Connolly (introduction and notes)	The Scarlet Letter and Selected Tales	52	The text of The Scarlet Letter is that of the authoritative Centenary Works edition, published by Ohio State University Press. Connolly's notes and the text are still included in the updated Penguin Classics edition, which has excised the tales and replaced his introduction with one by Nina Baym.
Henry James	Anthony Curtis	The Aspern Papers and The Turn of the Screw	Unknown	Still in print as a Penguin Classic.
Samuel Johnson	Patrick Cruttwell	Selected Writings	33	
Samuel Johnson	D. J. Enright	The History of Rasselas, Prince of Abissinia	108	
Ben Jonson	Michael Jamieson	Three Comedies (Volpone/The Alchemist/Bartholomew Fair)	13	
Thomas Malory	John Lawlor (introduction); Janet Cowen	Le Morte d'Arthur, Volume 1	43	
Thomas Malory	John Lawlor (introduction); Janet Cowen	Le Morte d'Arthur, Volume 2	44	
Christopher Marlowe	J. B. Steane	The Complete Plays	37	
Charles Maturin	Alethea Hayter	Melmoth the Wanderer	110	
Herman Melville	Harold Beaver	Billy Budd, Sailor and Other Stories	29	
Herman Melville	Harold Beaver	Moby-Dick	82	
Herman Melville	Harold Beaver	Redburn	105	
Herman Melville	George Woodcock	Typee	70	
George Meredith	George Woodcock	The Egoist	34	
John Milton	C. A. Patrides	Selected Prose	91	
William Morris	Asa Briggs	News from Nowhere and Selected Writings and Designs	115	
Thomas Nashe	J. B. Steane	The Unfortunate Traveller and Other Works	67	Still in print as a Penguin Classic.
Thomas Love Peacock	Raymond Wright	Nightmare Abbey and Crotchet Castle	45	Does not include a bibliography per se, but an editorial note is appended to the introduction, giving a brief list of editions and criticism. Still in print as a Penguin Classic.
Edgar Allan Poe	David Galloway	Selected Writings	28	
Edgar Allan Poe	Harold Beaver	The Narrative of Arthur Gordon Pym of Nantucket	97	
Edgar Allan Poe	Harold Beaver	The Science Fiction of Edgar Allan Poe	106	
Walter Scott	A. N. Wilson	Ivanhoe	143	
Walter Scott	Angus Calder	Old Mortality	98	
Walter Scott		The Heart of Mid-Lothian	129	
Walter Scott	Andrew Hook	Waverley	71	
Philip Sidney	Maurice Evans	Arcadia	111	
Tobias Smollett	Angus Ross	Humphry Clinker	21	
Laurence Sterne	A. Alvarez (introduction)	A Sentimental Journey	26	
Laurence Sterne	Christopher Ricks (introduction); Graham Petrie	Tristram Shandy	19	Ricks's introductory essay is reprinted in the current Penguin Classics edition.
Robert Louis Stevenson	Jenni Calder	Dr Jekyll and Mr Hyde and Other Stories	117	
Jonathan Swift	Michael Foot (introduction); Peter Dixon and John Chalker (notes)	Gulliver's Travels	22	
William Makepeace Thackeray	John Sutherland; Michael Greenfield	The History of Henry Esmond	49	
William Makepeace Thackeray	J. I. M. Stewart (introduction); Donald Hawes	The History of Pendennis	76	
William Makepeace Thackeray	J. I. M. Stewart	Vanity Fair	35	
Edward John Trelawny	David Wright	Records of Shelley, Byron and The Author	88	
Anthony Trollope	Stephen Wall	Can You Forgive Her?	86	
Anthony Trollope	John Sutherland	Phineas Finn	85	
Anthony Trollope	John Sutherland; Stephen Gill	The Eustace Diamonds	41	
Anthony Trollope	Laurence Lerner (introduction); Peter Fairclough	The Last Chronicle of Barset	24	
Anthony Trollope	John William Ward (introduction); Robert Mason	North America	38	
Mark Twain	Justin Kaplan	A Connecticut Yankee in King Arthur's Court	64	
Mark Twain	Malcolm Bradbury	Pudd'nhead Wilson	40	
Mark Twain	Peter Coveney	The Adventures of Huckleberry Finn	18	
John Webster	D. C. Gunby	Three Plays (The White Devil/The Duchess of Malfi/The Devil's Law Case)	81	
Gilbert White	Richard Mabey	The Natural History of Selborne	112	
Oscar Wilde	Hesketh Pearson	De Profundis and Other Writings	89	
Richard Steele and Joseph Addison	Angus Ross	Selections from The Tatler and The Spectator	130	
	Gāmini Salgādo	Cony-Catchers and Bawdy Baskets	83	
	Peter Happé	Four Morality Plays (The Castle of Perseverance/Magnyfycence/King Johan/Ane satire of the thrie estaitis)	119	
	Peter Happé	English Mystery Plays	93	
	Keith Sturgess	Three Elizabethan Domestic Tragedies (Arden of Faversham/A Yorkshire Tragedy/A Woman Killed with Kindness)	39	
	Peter Happé	Tudor Interludes	62	
Cyril Tourneur; John Webster; Thomas Middleton	Gāmini Salgādo	Three Jacobean Tragedies (The Revenger's Tragedy/The White Devil/The Changeling)	6	Authorship of The Revenger's Tragedy (which was published anonymously) was then attributed to Tourneur; today it is generally thought to have been written by Middleton.
Sir George Etherege; William Wycherley; William Congreve	Gāmini Salgādo	Three Restoration Comedies (The Man of Mode/The Country Wife/Love for Love)	27	Still in print as a Penguin Classic.
John Marston; Thomas Middleton; Ben Jonson; Philip Massinger	Gāmini Salgādo	Four Jacobean City Comedies (The Dutch Courtesan/A Mad World, My Masters/The Devil Is an Ass/A New Way to Pay Old Debts)	101	
Horace Walpole; William Beckford; Mary Shelley	Mario Praz (introduction)	Three Gothic Novels (The Castle of Otranto/Vathek/Frankenstein)	36	Still in print as a Penguin Classic. The text of Frankenstein is that of the revised 1832 edition. The cover art is a detail from J. H. Fuseli's 1781 oil painting The Nightmare, and the detail was retained when the book was first reprinted as a Penguin Classic in 1986. However, reprints from 2003 onwards feature the detail of a photograph by Sir Simon Marsden instead.

=== 2012 to present ===
Author	Title	Essayist	Essay	Notes
Elizabeth von Arnim	Elizabeth and Her German Garden			
Jane Austen	Persuasion	Elizabeth Bowen	Unknown	
Jane Austen	Pride and Prejudice	J. B. Priestley	Austen Portrays a Small World with Humour and Detachment	
Charlotte Brontë	Jane Eyre	Elaine Showalter	Jane Eyre	The essay is from Showalter's A Literature of Their Own: British Women Novelists from Brontë to Lessing (Princeton: Princeton University Press, 1977)
Emily Brontë	Wuthering Heights	Virginia Woolf	Wuthering Heights	
Lewis Carroll	Alice's Adventures in Wonderland	Virginia Woolf	Lewis Carroll	
G. K. Chesterton	The Man Who Was Thursday	Unknown	Unknown	
Wilkie Collins	The Moonstone	T. S. Eliot	The Moonstone	
Daniel Defoe	Robinson Crusoe	David Blewett	The Island and the World	The essay is taken from a chapter in Blewett's Defoe's Art of Fiction: Robinson Crusoe, Moll Flanders, Colonel Jack, and Roxana (Toronto: University of Toronto Press, 1979).
George Eliot	Silas Marner			Correspondence between John Blackwood and George Eliot, and two contemporary reviews
Henry Fielding	Tom Jones	R. P. C. Mutter	Tom Jones	The essay is a reprint of Mutter's introduction to the original Penguin English Library edition (see above).
F. Scott Fitzgerald	The Great Gatsby			
Elizabeth Gaskell	North and South	V. S. Pritchett	The South Goes North	The essay is from Sir Victor's 1942 collection of essays, In My Good Books.
Nathaniel Hawthorne	The Scarlet Letter	D. H. Lawrence	Nathaniel Hawthorne and The Scarlet Letter	The essay is from Lawrence's Studies in Classic American Literature.
James Joyce	Dubliners			
Katherine Mansfield	The Garden Party			
Baroness Orczy	The Scarlet Pimpernel			
George Orwell	Animal Farm			
Walter Scott	Ivanhoe	A. N. Wilson	Ivanhoe	
Mary Shelley	Frankenstein	Paul Cantor	The Nightmare of Romantic Idealism	The text is that of the 1985 Penguin Classics edition, edited by Maurice Hindle, i. e. the 1832 text. The essay is taken from a chapter in Cantor's book, Creature and Creator: Myth-Making and English Romanticism (Cambridge and New York: Cambridge University Press, 1985).
Laurence Sterne	Tristram Shandy	V. S. Pritchett	Tristram Shandy	
Bram Stoker	Dracula	John Sutherland	Why Does the Count Come to England?	The essay is taken from Sutherland's Is Heathcliff a Murderer? Great Puzzles in Nineteenth Century Fiction (Oxford: Oxford University Press, 1998).
Mark Twain	The Adventures of Huckleberry Finn	Harold Bloom	Unknown	
Evelyn Waugh	Brideshead Revisited			
Oscar Wilde	The Picture of Dorian Gray	Peter Ackroyd	-	The essay is a reprint of Ackroyd's introduction to the first Penguin Classics edition.
