= Penguin Classics =

Imprint of Penguin Random House

- 2002 design of Penguin Classics
- Parent company: Penguin Books
- Country of origin: United Kingdom
- Headquarters location: London, England
- Publication types: Books
- Official website: www.penguinclassics.com

Penguin Classics is an imprint of Penguin Books under which classic works of literature are published in English, Spanish, Portuguese, and Korean among other languages. Literary critics see books in this series as important members of the Western canon, though many titles are translated or of non-Western origin; indeed, the series for decades since its creation included only translations, until it eventually incorporated the Penguin English Library imprint in 1986. The first Penguin Classic was E. V. Rieu's translation of The Odyssey, published in 1946, and Rieu went on to become general editor of the series. Rieu sought out literary novelists such as Robert Graves and Dorothy Sayers as translators, believing they would avoid "the archaic flavour and the foreign idiom that renders many existing translations repellent to modern taste".

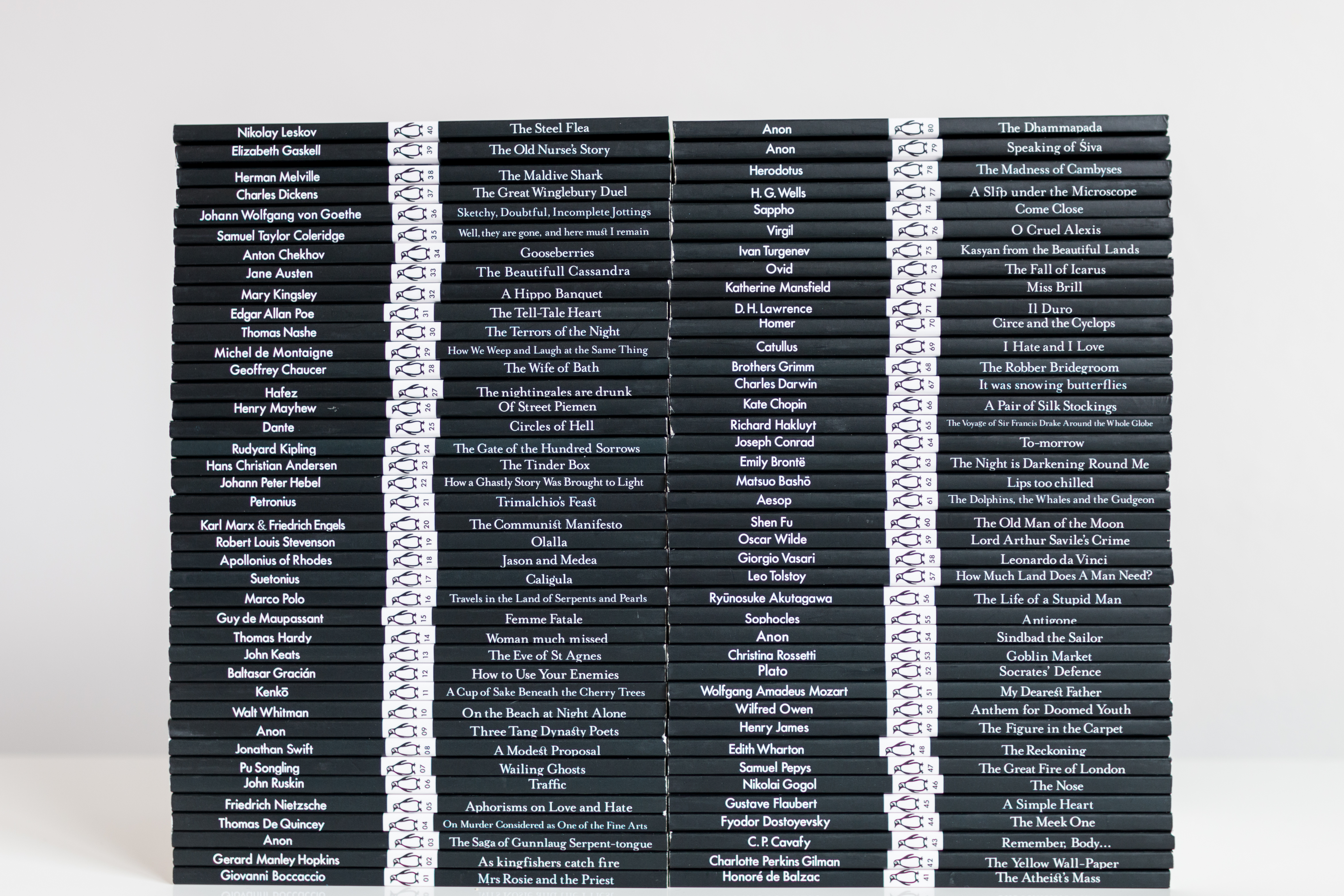
Celebrating their 80th anniversary in 2015, Penguin released 80 Little Black Classics

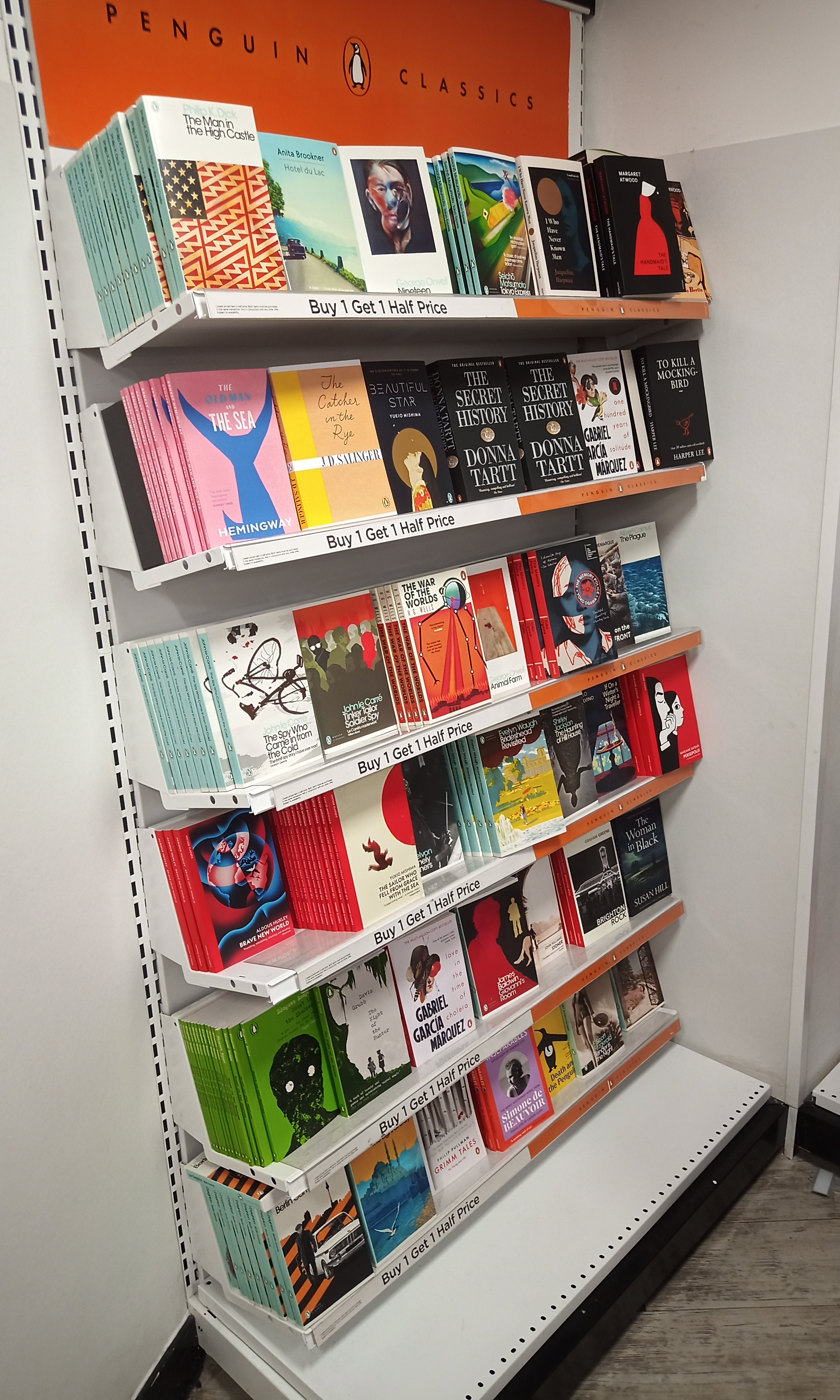
Penguin Classics on sale at a WH Smith at Leeds Bradford Airport.

In 1964 Betty Radice and Robert Baldick succeeded Rieu as joint editors, with Radice becoming sole editor in 1974 and serving as an editor for 21 years. As editor, Radice argued for the place of scholarship in popular editions, and modified the earlier Penguin convention of the plain text, adding line references, bibliographies, maps, explanatory notes and indexes. She broadened the canon of the 'Classics', and encouraged and diversified their readership while upholding academic standards.

== Design ==
Penguin Books paid particular attention to the design of its books, recruiting German typographer Jan Tschichold in 1947. The early minimalist designs were modernised by Italian art director Germano Facetti, who joined Penguin in 1961. The new classics were known as "Black Classics" for their black covers, which also featured artwork appropriate to the topic and period of the work. This design was revised in 1985 to have pale yellow covers with a black spine, colour-coded with a small mark to indicate language and period (red for English, purple for ancient Latin and Greek, yellow for medieval and continental European languages, and green for other languages).

In 2002, Penguin redesigned its entire catalogue. The redesign restored the black cover, adding a white stripe and orange lettering. The text page design was also overhauled to follow a more closely prescribed template, allowing for faster copyediting and typesetting, but reducing the options for individual design variations suggested by a text's structure or historical context (for example, in the choice of text typeface). Prior to 2002, the text page typography of each book in the Classics series had been overseen by a team of in-house designers; this department was drastically reduced in 2003 as part of the production cost reductions. The in-house text design department still exists, albeit much smaller than formerly. Recent design work includes the Penguin Little Black Classic series, which was released in 2015.

Penguin Classics collaborated with Bill Amberg in 2008 in the design of six books (A Room with a View, Breakfast at Tiffany's, The Big Sleep, The Great Gatsby, Brideshead Revisited, and The Picture of Dorian Gray).

In 2019, Jim Stoddart redesigned the cover. The Mrs Eaves of the old lettering was swapped for unitalicized Futura, a sans-serif font. The signature orange of the author name was replaced with white for a more uniform look. All Penguin Classics printed after 2019 use this design.

== Series ==
Within the broader category of Classics, Penguin has issued specialized series with their own designs. These include:

- Penguin Nature Classics, issued from 1987 onwards, with authors such as Peter Matthiessen, Mary Austin, Henry David Thoreau, and John Muir.
- Penguin Modern Classics, issued from 1961 onwards, with authors such as Truman Capote, James Joyce, George Orwell, Vladimir Nabokov, and Antoine de Saint-Exupéry. Some titles come with critical apparatus. The series has gone through a number of redesigns, the most recent being in June 2017: see here.
  - The series was renamed Penguin 20th Century Classics in May 1989, but reverted to its old name in February 2000. 20th Century Classics feature full-page front cover art, with a light blue-green/eau de nil rear cover and spine.
  - In 2021 Penguin published a celebratory survey of books currently in the series, called The Penguin Modern Classics Book. This was similar to The Penguin Classics Book about the parent series issued in 2018, was again edited by Henry Eliot, and covered the story from World War I up to the recent past.
- Penguin Enriched Classics, issued, such as Adventures of Huckleberry Finn, Pride and Prejudice, The Scarlet Letter, and A Tale of Two Cities
- Penguin Popular Classics, issued in 1994, are paperback editions of texts under the Classics imprints. They were a response to Wordsworth Classics, a series of very cheap reprints which imitated Penguin in using black as its signature color.
- Penguin Classics Deluxe Edition, issued from 1997 onward, are paperback editions of texts with matte paper covers, French flaps, deckled page edges and cover art often illustrated by renowned comic artists.
- Penguin Designer Classics, issued in 2007, is a set of five limited-edition books, with covers created by fashion designers to commemorate the series' 60th Anniversary
- Penguin Mini Modern Classics, issued in 2011, is an assortment of fifty pocket-sized books from fifty different authors such as Franz Kafka, Italo Calvino, E. M. Forster, Virginia Woolf and Stefan Zweig. It has been released to celebrate the 50th Anniversary of the Penguin Modern Classics. It is currently out of print.
- Penguin Little Black Classics, issued in 2015 a series of pocket-sized classics introduced to celebrate the 80th anniversary of Penguin Books.
- Pocket Penguins, issued in 2016. The series echoes the style of the original Penguin Books, with smaller A-format size, and tri-band design.
  - The first 20 books were released in May 2016, and described by publishing director Simon Winder as "a mix of the famous and the unjustly overlooked".
- Penguin Clothbound Classics, begun in 2008, issues classics in hardbound form wrapped in Brillianta (rayon) cloth, with an emphasis on aesthetics and collectability, designed by Coralie Bickford-Smith. Despite being hardbound, YouTubers have complained online about durability and fading covers, although since 2021, with The Little Prince, a more durable cover design has been used. The series has also sparked spinoff ones, those being the clothbound poetry, clothbound philosophy, and the (smaller format) little clothbounds.
- Penguin Crime & Espionage, issued in 2023. An initial series of 10 paperback books

== Bibliography ==
No definitive bibliography of Penguin Classics has yet been published, although several partial bibliographies have been issued. The earliest come from the Penguin Catalogues, published annually covering in-print editions. The 1963 catalogue, for example, lists 97 titles, although by then the series overall had produced 118 volumes. In the 1980s Penguin (UK) began publishing discrete catalogues of its Classics and Twentieth Century Classics series, listing all the titles then available in the UK (with prices in sterling).

The Penguin Collectors' Society have published two bibliographies of the early, pre-ISBN (referred to as 'L') editions: firstly in 1994, with an update in 2008.

Also in 2008, Penguin Books USA published a complete annotated listing of all Penguin Classics titles in a single paperback volume in the style of its Penguin Classics books. The list organises the collection multiple times: alphabetically by author, subject categories, authors by region, and a complete alphabetic title index. This compiled listing indicates there are over 1,300 titles, and more to be published. The final print version of this listing was issued in 2012, however a copy of the 2016 listing remains available on the Penguin website.

In 2018 Penguin published The Penguin Classics Book, a celebratory survey of the volumes currently in print, listing works by author location and chronologically from antiquity to World War I. It includes an appendix with a selection of out-of-print titles. This book was edited by Henry Eliot.

In 2005, an incomplete collection of books in the series was sold on Amazon.com as "The Penguin Classics Library Complete Collection". In 2005, the collection consisted of 1,082 different books (in multiple editions) and cost US$7,989.50. The collection weighed about 750 pounds (340 kg) and took about 77 linear feet (23.5 m) of shelf space; laid end-to-end the books would reach about 630 feet (192 m).

A feature of the World's Biggest Bookstore in Toronto, Ontario, from its inception in the 1970s, and for years thereafter, was that it stocked all of the Penguin Classics titles. The upper section of the second floor of the store was dedicated to Penguin exclusively.

== 60th Anniversary ==
In 2007, Penguin Classics released a set of five books limited to 1,000 copies each, known as the Designer Classics. Each book was specially designed to celebrate Penguin Classics' Diamond Anniversary:

- The cover for Crime and Punishment was created by graphic designers Stephen Sorrell and Damon Murray of Fuel, who used Cyrillic and English type. Stephen explains: "This visual device echoes the mind games in the head of Raskolnikov as he battles with his voice of conscience. We want the design to form the shape and feel of the book as a whole not just its cover." They have screen printed the cover on the same brown craft paper used for the text. The book has a Perspex slipcase.
- The Idiot was designed by industrial designer Ron Arad and has no cover, so the reader will pick it up and read the author's first words. It is stripped back to show the glue and thread in the spine, which is visible through an acrylic slipcase (with a lid) with a Fresnel lens, so the text appears to move as the lid is removed. Arad explains: "By not wanting to have a cover, it ended with the book becoming an amazing object that is alive, but which maintains its transparency. It became a glorious box with a book inside—almost like a monument."
- The cover for Lady Chatterley's Lover was created by fashion designer Paul Smith.
- The cover for Madame Bovary was designed by fashion designer Manolo Blahnik. The jacket features Blahnik's original painting of Emma with her lover, and the book is protected by a Perspex slipcase. He said: "I wanted to come up with something light, sensual... something frivolous, because this is a novel about the dangers of frivolity. And I wanted something sexy too, cheeky. I usually focus on one part of the foot—the shoe. For this project, I had to consider a whole scene, there had to be a context, which is new for me. But I managed to sneak in a pair of shoes anyway. She wore good shoes."
- The cover for Tender Is the Night was designed by English filmmaker, photographer, and visual artist Sam Taylor-Wood, who used an ethereal black-and-white photograph printed onto tracing paper. An elegant, barefoot young man stands with his hands in his pocket, perfectly summing up the elegance and fragility of Nicole and Dick Diver's world. The book is wrapped in a cloth hardcover and has a Perspex slipcase.

== In the public eye ==
In 2013, Penguin Classics published Morrissey's Autobiography. Concerns arose about the imprint's publishing a book too recently published to be an acknowledged classic, that such a book diluted the brand. Penguin argued that the autobiography was "a classic in the making". The Independent's Boyd Tonkin wrote: "The droning narcissism of the [book] may harm [Morrissey's] name a little. It ruins that of his publisher... Morrissey will survive his unearned elevation. I doubt that the reputation of Penguin Classics will."

Penguin Classics sold well during the 2019-2021 coronavirus pandemic when citizens in many countries, forced into lockdown as a preventive measure, found solace in books.

== See also ==
- Bantam Classic Book Series, paperback reprints of classic books
- Barnes & Noble Classics series
- Classic book
- Everyman's Library, paperback (Orion in the UK and Tuttle in the USA) and hardback (Alfred A. Knopf in the US and Random House in the UK) and reprints of classic literature
- Library of America, a non-profit publisher of classic American literature issued in hardback
- List of Radical Thinkers releases
- Modern Library
- Oxford World's Classics, competitor to Penguin Classics focusing on reprints of classic and dramatic literature, aimed at students and the general public, in contrast to Penguin's general readership
- Penguin English Library, the imprint under which English classics were published from 1963 until the series was merged with Classics in 1987
- Signet Classics, budget paperback reprints of classics and scholarly works
- Western canon
- Wordsworth's Classics, budget paperback reprints of classics
