= The Last Chronicle of Barset =

1867 novel by Anthony Trollope

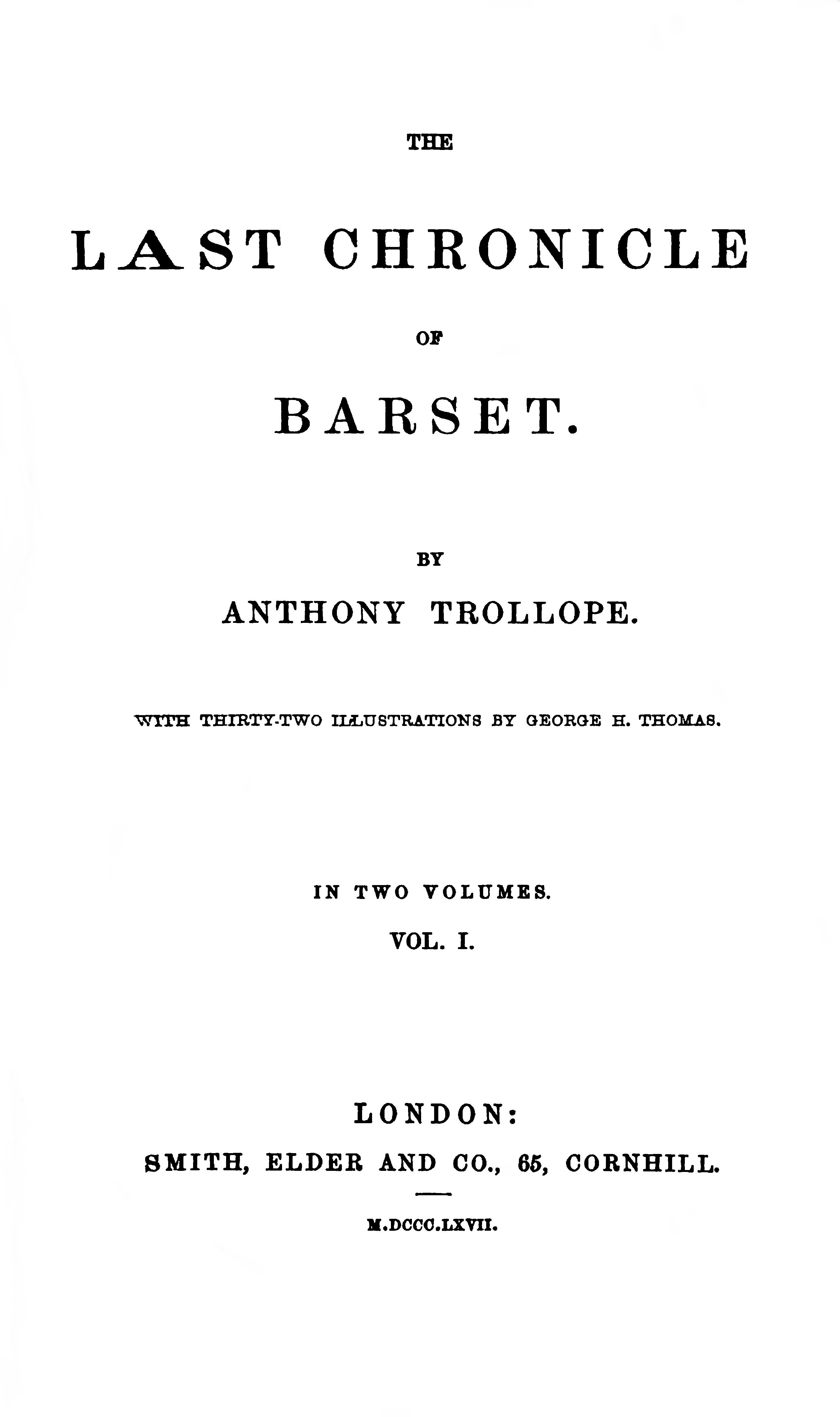
- First edition title page
- Author: Anthony Trollope
- Illustrator: George Housman Thomas
- Language: English
- Series: Chronicles of Barsetshire
- Publisher: Smith & Elder (book)
- Publication date: 1 December 1866 – 6 July 1867 (serial); March (Vol. I) & July (Vol. II) 1867 (book)
- Publication place: England
- Media type: Print (Serial and Hardback)
- Preceded by: The Small House at Allington (1864)

The Last Chronicle of Barset is a novel by English author Anthony Trollope, published in 1867. It is the sixth and final book in the Chronicles of Barsetshire series, preceded by The Small House at Allington. The novel is set in the fictional county of Barsetshire and deploys characters from the earlier novels, whilst concentrating on the personnel associated with the cathedral. The main narrative thread is catalysed by the loss of a cheque which had been in the possession of the Reverend Josiah Crawley, and the subsequent reactions of his friends and enemies. Trollope drew inspiration from his father and mother in the creation of the Rev. and Mrs. Crawley.

In his autobiography, Trollope regarded this novel as "the best novel I have written.", although later commentators do not agree with this judgement. The serialisation was illustrated by G H Thomas who was selected by the publisher, though Trollope had wished for Millais who had illustrated The Small House at Allington.

== Plot summary ==
The Reverend Josiah Crawley, the perpetual curate of Hogglestock, has a large family and a small income. He cashes a cheque whose origin is shrouded in mystery. The novel then develops the attitudes and reactions of those around him, some of whom, not least Mrs Proudie, the virago wife of the Bishop of Barchester, conclude that Crawley stole the cheque.

The narrative contains numerous sub-plots. One, which is continued from The Small House at Allington, involves Lily Dale and Johnny Eames and is tenuously connected to the main thread. By contrast, Crawley's daughter, Grace, is courted by Henry Grantly, son of Archdeacon Grantly, which poses problems for the archdeacon, who recoils from her lack of family rank or wealth. Initially he joins the accusatory group led by Mrs Proudie; the bishop does not agree, but succumbs to his wife's familiar dominance.

Almost broken by poverty and trouble, Crawley hardly knows himself if he is guilty or not; fortunately, the mystery is resolved in his favour, just as Major Grantly's determination and Grace Crawley's own merit force the archdeacon to overcome his prejudice against her. As with Lucy Robarts in Framley Parsonage, the objecting parent finally invites the young lady into the family; this new connection also inspires the dean and archdeacon to find a new, more prosperous, post for Grace's impoverished father.

Through death or marriage, this final volume manages to tie up more than one thread from the beginning of the series. One subplot deals with the death of Mrs. Proudie, and the bishop's subsequent grief and collapse. Mrs. Proudie, upon her arrival in Barchester in Barchester Towers, had increased the tribulations of the gentle Mr. Harding, title character of The Warden; he dies in peaceful old age, mourned by his family and the old men he loved and looked after as Warden of Hiram's Hospital.

== Context ==
American scholars like James Kincaid have stated that although Trollope's The Last Chronicle of Barset is a work of fiction, it provides an insight into the Victorian era. Robert Polhemus has argued that Trollope was particularly concerned with the social changes that were emerging. Polhemus believed that such changes, including the changing ethical standards, the loss of morality, the emergence of materialism and the rise of bureaucracy had provoked fear in Trollope, thus influencing him to write the novel. Trollope perceived these changes as dangerous because such factors prevented the growth of individualism. This was of concern to Trollope because without individualism, tradition could not be shaped.

Hannah Rogers has argued that Trollope was also fascinated by the history of moral philosophy, a concept that is concerned with human ethics and the way humans react in certain situations. She draws this conclusion from how Trollope's novel features plots that centre on human morality. The impoverished Reverend Crawley is targeted by the powerful Mrs. Proudie for an alleged theft while wealthy stockbrokers can manipulate their way through unfaithful dealings, taking their customers' money. Scholars such as Geoffrey Harvey have interpreted Trollope's novel as a reflection of the prevailing social concerns of the late Victorian period, such as the loss of ethics as materialism began to emerge.

== Writing style influences ==
Front cover page of The Last Chronicle of Barset.

Rogers states that Trollope's writing style was influenced by Roman orator Cicero and his concept of honestum in which he dictates "all that is manly, honourable, graceful, honest and decorus". Rogers drew this conclusion from Trollope's acclamation of Cicero for this concept in his Life of Cicero. In 1877, Trollope wrote to Henry Merivale that "No doubt many a literary artist so conceals his art that readers do not know there is much art". Rogers has argued that Trollope's honest literary style involved "concealing his artistry". She interprets this as writing in a manner that did not utilise his full potential, as doing so would prevent him from creating a plot that was far-fetched and unrealistic. Trollope believed that by doing so, he would create an immediate and familiar text for ordinary readers. Writing in an 'honest' manner allowed his readers to recognise the similarities between themselves and the characters. The point of this, as Rogers argues, is so that his readers do not become immersed into a world of imaginary creatures whose lives do not resemble their own in any way.

However, author Henry James criticised Trollope's writing style in this novel, finding it "rather stale". James argued that Trollope overused his 'honest' writing style, causing it to lose its uniqueness and become "copiously watered". James concluded that while Trollope was not the most articulate writer, he was one of the most reliable writers as his stories accurately reflected the Victorian age.

== Critical analysis ==
=== Power ===
Academic professor Kincaid has argued that power is illustrated throughout the novel. Power is held by wealthy individuals and the church, reflecting Victorian society where there was a heavy emphasis placed on God and religion. Throughout the play, the lives of lower-class individuals such as the poverty-stricken Josiah Crawley are dictated by the Church and the wealthy who hold the power within society. Ellen Moody points out that the power dynamics of society are immediately established in the opening chapter. She argues that the power of the rich is displayed through how the wealthy stockbrokers can constantly commit fraudulent actions and yet Crawley is regarded as suspicious for allegedly stealing £20. From this, Moody has interpreted the power dynamics as a reflection of one's status in society. She claims that Crawley's low status and impoverished living conditions have subjected him to a life dictated by the wealthy.

Miguel Perez takes note of how there are different forms of power within the novel. Doctor Grantly holds power in the sense that he is the archdeacon, manages multiple businesses and holds the position as the vicar of Plumstead. On the other hand, Reverend Crawley, who is not as wealthy as Grantly and struggles to feed his family, is powerful in the way that he is well educated and intelligent. Perez argues that while Grantly and Crawley's characters contrast each other greatly, both possess some sort of power whether it be wealth or knowledge.

=== Pride ===
Gordon Hirsch and Louella Hirsch present the argument that pride is predominantly revealed through Reverend Crawley's character. Both scholars argue that Crawley's refusal to admit that he is somewhat responsible for his suffering stems from his pride. While the wealthy, such as Mrs. Proudie is responsible for placing Crawley on trial for a crime he did not commit, Crawley does not attempt to improve his situation. He resigns from his job and "would do nothing. He would not eat, nor would he even sit at table or say the accustomed grace". The Hirsch academics argue that Crawley constantly blames those surrounding him, unable to see his self-inflicted suffering due to the pride he holds for himself. Furthermore, David Mazurowski states that Crawley is a prideful self martyr, someone who intentionally inflicts suffering on themselves to satisfy a mental need. In this case, Mazurowski believes that Crawley's mental need is the desire to be perceived as heroic and noble for being able to withstand the allegations against him.

Moody notes that Lily Dale's pride strongly resembles Crawley's behaviour of prideful self martyr. Moody states that the only difference is that Lily's prideful behaviour does not result in self-inflicted suffering. Instead, Lily's pride emerges when she chooses the path of an unmarried life despite her mother's pleas and Mrs. Thorne's criticism of her choice to not marry. Lily tells Johnny Eames, "I will not have myself planted out in the middle, for people to look at," which Moody interprets as Lily rejecting the concept of marriage. Perez admires Lily's pride, interpreting it as a positive characteristic as he believes it demonstrates that Lily is not influenced by the societal expectations of marriage.

=== Feminism ===
Kincaid has argued that this last novel differentiates itself from the rest of the series in the role that women play. Kincaid points out that Mrs. Crawley is depicted as the one who acts as her husband's rational side. She urges him to recognise the pointless nature of sulking, telling him to "be a man and bear it". Mrs. Dale and Lily are aware of Crawley's innocence and even more, recognise the stubbornness of men, declaring that "A jury of men will not". Mrs. Proudie has no legitimate role in the Church but she does influence the actions of her husband, the Bishop of Barchester. She is confident in her ability to persuade her husband through sexual means when disagreements arise. Furthermore, Kincaid has noted the power dynamics of this couple as when alone, Mrs. Proudie calls her husband Tom yet he still acknowledges her as Mrs. Proudie. From this, Kincaid has interpreted Trollope's novel as a reflection of his society whereby feminism was beginning to emerge.

However, Moody disagrees with Kincaid's argument of Trollope inserting feminism in his novel, arguing that he is "profoundly against regarding women as having value individually". She comes to this judgment after noting how the female characters are either wives or mothers who possess some sort of usefulness and virtue. Moreover, Moody concludes that Trollope had written Lily Dale as a character who found peace and comfort in a small house with her uncle and mother. Were Trollope a true feminist, Moody argues that Lily Dale would have been illustrated to have found happiness through traveling or finding a new job.

== Connection to Trollope’s other novels ==
While The Last Chronicle of Barset can be read as a stand-alone novel, this text is part of the Chronicles of Barsetshire series. This series has six novels that centre on the lives of the people in a small cathedral town situated in the fictional Barsetshire. The series revolves around the relationship between the rich and the poor and the sociopolitical laws of the Barsetshire society. The first novel, The Warden (1855) centres on the moral dilemmas of Reverend Septimus Harding and he appears again in the second novel, Barchester Towers.

Moody takes note of Lily Dale's character development from The Small House at Allington (1864) to The Last Chronicle of Barset (1867). In the prior novel, Trollope had shown Lily Dale as publicly humiliated and treated as an object. However, in the last novel, Lily firmly states to Johnny Eames, upon the occasion of his final marriage proposal, "I will not have myself planted out in the middle, for people to look at. What there is left would die soon." Moody suggests that this newfound confidence is evidence of her growth from a timid teenager to a prideful woman.

Mazurowski points to Reverend Crawley's personality, arguing that Crawley's personality as being both prideful and a self-pitying martyr has altered slightly across three novels - 'Framley Parsonage (1860), 'The Small House at Allington(1862) and The Last Chronicle of Barset (1867). In Trollope's Framley Parsonage, Mazurowski takes note of Crawley's prideful behaviour as Crawley often mocked his close friend Arabin by insulting his horse and refusing to feast with him. Mazurowski argues that Crawley's prideful behaviour intensifies in The Last Chronicle of Barset as Crawley becomes prideful to the point where he refuses to see his own self-inflicted suffering.

== Adaptations ==
=== Visual form ===
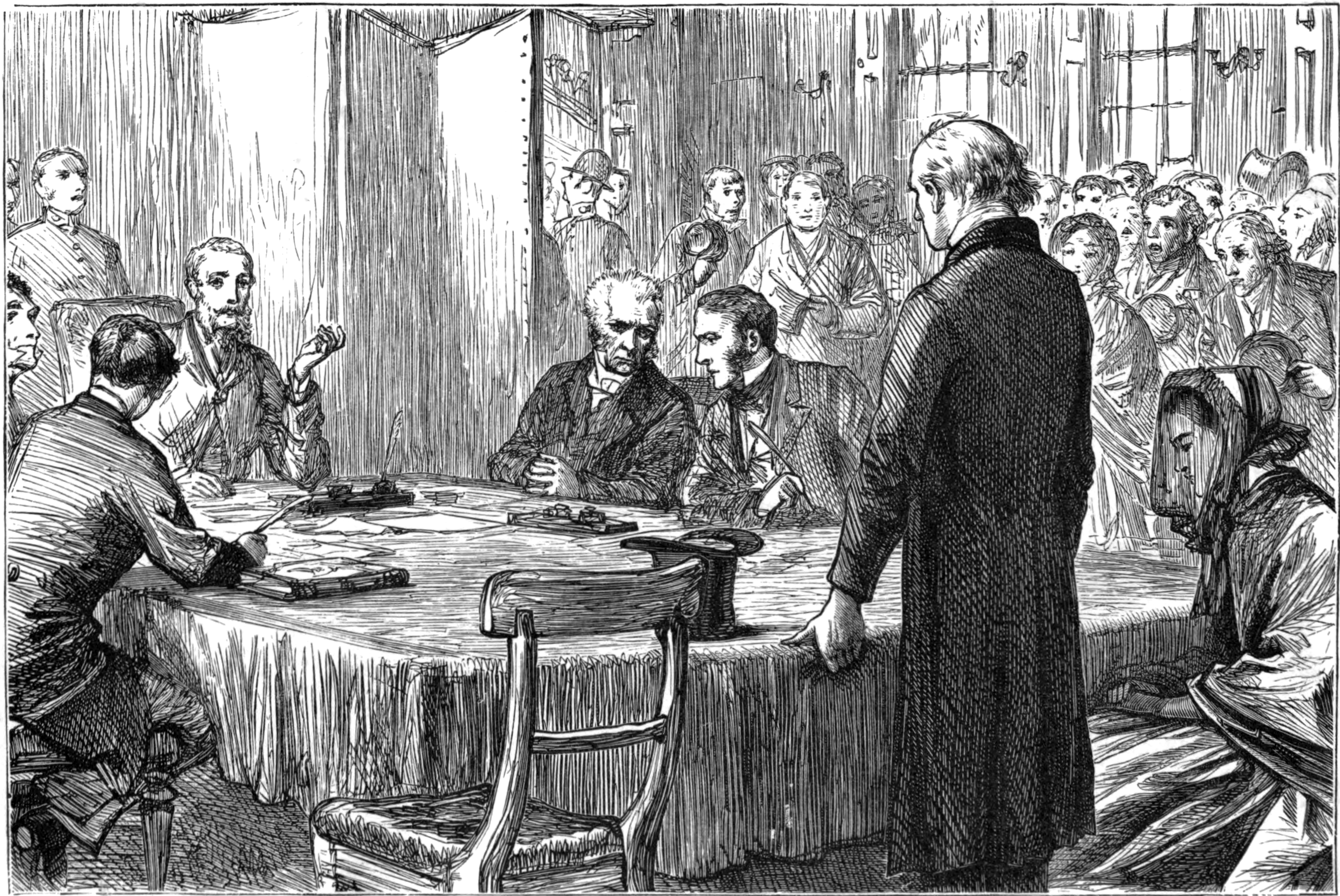
Original illustration by G.H. Thomas of Mr. Crawley standing before the magistrates.

Other than its written form, The Last Chronicles of Barset has also been transformed into visual illustrations. The visual illustration was designed by George Housman Thomas and was published in 1867 alongside the novel. Titled The Last Chronicle of Barset With Illustrations, the black and white copy features certain events from the novel. For certain illustrations, Thomas had drawn inspiration from John Everett Millais, a Victorian illustrator. Millias had provided multiple illustrations of The Crawley Family in Trollope's fourth novel in the series, Framley Parsonage. Gordon Ray states that these illustrations serve to vividly complement the novel as they provide an understanding of Trollope's intentions with each character. While Trollope did not draw the illustrations himself, Ray stated that each sketch was tailored to Trollope's own personal desire as Trollope believed that "the author can select the subjects better than the artist - having all the feelings of the story at his fingers' end."

=== Series ===
The novel has also been converted into a film series directed by Stephen Harrison. Released in 1959 by the British Broadcasting Corporation, the series had six episodes released over the span of three months before coming to an end. The actors in this series include Hugh Burden as Mr. Crawley, Maureen Pryor as Mrs. Crawley, Clive Morton as Archdeacon Grantly and Olga Lindo as Mrs. Proudie.

=== Radio drama ===
The text has been transformed into a number of radio dramas. The first was released in 1998. Directed by Cherry Cookson and dramatised by Martin Wade, the play was created following the previous success of a dramatisation of The Small House at Allington. Another radio version directed by Marion Nancarrow and dramatised by Nick Waburton was released on BBC Radio in 2011.

=== Audiobooks ===
A number of Audiobook versions have also been created and are currently on Audible.com. One is voiced by Timothy West.

== Characters ==
=== Clergy ===
- Reverend Josiah Crawley is the central character throughout the novel. He is the perpetual curate of Hogglestock. He has been accused of stealing a cheque worth 20 pounds. His wife is Mary Crawley, and together they are the parents of another central character, Grace Crawley, as well as two other children named Jane and Robert "Bob" Crawley.
- Bishop Proudie, also Doctor Proudie, is Bishop of the diocese of Barchester. His wife is Mrs. Proudie, and both characters were introduced in the preceding Barchester Towers novel.
- Archdeacon Theophilus Grantly, also Doctor Grantly, is Archdeacon of Barchester and Rector of Plumstead Episcopi. He is married to Mrs. Grantly, and their son Major Henry Grantly is a central character in the main plot. Doctor Grantly and his wife were introduced in the preceding novel The Warden.
- Dean Frank Arabin, also Doctor Arabin, serves as the Dean of Barchester. He is the husband of Eleanor Arabin, and they have a daughter named Susan "Posy" Arabin. Doctor Arabin is a close friend of Josiah Crawley, but is absent from his deanery for the majority of the story.
- Septimus Harding is a retired warden and precentor living at Barchester deanery. He is the father of Eleanor Arabin and Mrs. Grantly. While on his deathbed, Mr. Harding recommends Josiah Crawley for a new appointment in the church. Mr. Harding is the title character of the preceding novel The Warden.
- Reverend Mortimer Tempest, also Doctor Tempest, is Rector of Silverbridge and is charged with the task of heading an ecclesiastical commission to investigate the ramifications of Josiah Crawley's expected conviction under criminal law.
- Reverend Mark Robarts is the vicar of the parish of Framley and a friend of the Crawley family throughout the story. His wife is Mrs. Robarts, and the Robarts family is central to the preceding novel Framley Parsonage.

=== Non-clerical male characters ===
- Major Henry Grantly is a central character and is the love interest of Grace Crawley. He is the son of Archdeacon Grantly and Mrs. Grantly. He is a widower with one child, Edith Grantly. He is retired from the army, and resides at Crosby Lodge.
- Johnny Eames is the "private secretary to the Chief Commissioner of the Income-tax board". He is in love with Lily Dale but his proposals are rejected numerous times throughout the story. He is the nephew of Thomas Toogood and a distant cousin of Mary Crawley and Grace Crawley. Mr. Eames also participates in a secondary romance with Madalina Demolines which is ended before the conclusion of the story.
- Thomas Toogood is an attorney who assists Josiah Crawley in his legal troubles. He is the uncle of Johnny Eames and cousin of Mary Crawley.
- Adolphus Crosbie is the love interest of Lily Dale. He had previously broken off relations with Lily Dale to marry Lady Alexandrina who died a short while before the storyline begins. After dissolving his relationship with Lily Dale, Mr. Crosbie had received a "thrashing" from Johnny Eames.
- Conway Dalrymple is a painter. Over the course of the story, Mr. Dalrymple is painting a portrait of one of his love interests, Clara Van Siever. The time and place for sittings are orchestrated by another of his love interests, Mrs. Dobbs Broughton. Mr. Dalrymple is also a close friend of Johnny Eames.

=== Female characters ===
- Grace Crawley is a central character and serves as the love interest of Major Henry Grantly. Miss Crawley is the daughter of Josiah Crawley and Mary Crawley, and is a cousin of Johnny Eames. She becomes close friends with Lily Dale.
- Lily Dale is the love interest of Johnny Eames and had a previous relationship with Adolphus Crosbie as detailed in the preceding novel The Small House at Allington. She becomes close friends with Grace Crawley.
- Mrs. Proudie is the wife of Bishop Proudie. The Proudie storyline is a continuation of Barchester Towers.
- Madalina Demolines is a socialite who has an eye on Johnny Eames and tries to impede his romance with Lily Dale. She also attempts to stop a romance from budding between Conway Dalrymple and Mrs. Dobbs Broughton and also Conway Dalrymple and Miss Van Siever.
- Maria Dobbs Broughton is a Lady who loves her husband but finds herself attracted to the artist Conway Dalrymple and tries to arrange meetings between him and Miss Van Siever so that he can marry her so that it will be socially acceptable for them to be friends.
- Miss Clara Van Siever, the love interest of Conway Dalrymple, is persuaded to be the subject of one of his paintings and therefore meets him clandestinely at Mrs. Dobbs Broughton's house.
- Mrs Van Siever, Clara's mother, is a partner with Mrs Dobbs Broughton's husband and arranges a marriage between her daughter and another partner.
