= Andrea Aguyar =

Uruguayan liberated slave and soldier

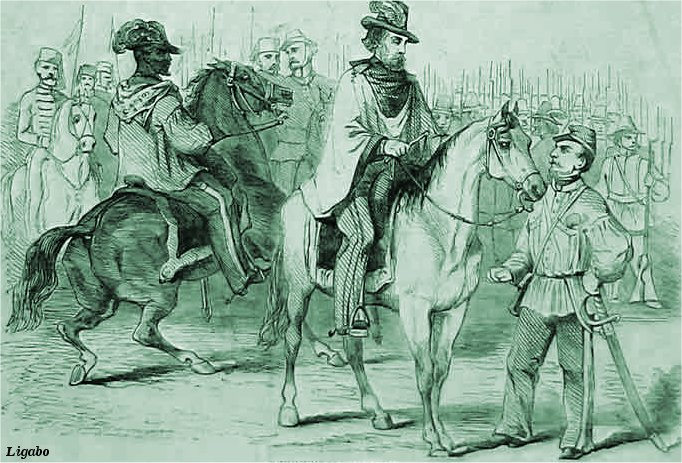
Andrea Aguyar riding behind Garibaldi, illustration by George H. Thomas published in "The Illustrated London News", on 21 July 1849 (after Aguyar's death).

Andrea Aguyar, nicknamed Andrea il Moro, (?, Montevideo, Uruguay - 30 June 1849, Rome, Roman Republic (now Italy)) was a former Black slave from Uruguay who became a follower of Garibaldi in both South America and Italy, and who died in defence of the revolutionary Roman Republic of 1849.

== In Uruguay ==
Aguyar was born in Montevideo to black slave parents, and was a slave until his young adulthood. The abolition of slavery in Uruguay was directly linked to the outbreak of the Uruguayan Civil War in 1838. Both sides - the Liberal "Colorados" and the Conservative "Blancos" proclaimed the emancipation of slaves in 1842, in order to mobilize the former slaves to reinforce their respective military forces.

During the siege of Montevideo, the newly-freed slaves, who formed a contingent 5,000 strong, and the community of foreign exiles and expatriates, were mostly responsible for the defence of the city. Among the latter Giuseppe Garibaldi - then a young Italian exile starting to make a name for himself as a daring revolutionary and guerrilla leader - headed the "Italian Legion". It was at that time that Aguyar's association with Garibaldi began.

In his memoirs, Garibaldi greatly praised these freed slaves: "True sons of freedom. Their lances, longer than normal length, their dark black [nerissimi] faces, their robust limbs used to permanent and demanding work, their perfect discipline". Most of these freed slaves did not, however, follow Garibaldi when he returned to Europe in 1848 - which Andrea Aguyar did.

== In Rome ==
Aguyar travelled with Garibaldi on the latter's 1848 return to Italy, and was likely at his side during Garibaldi's earlier phases of participation in the First Italian War of Independence at Piedmont and Lombardy, and Garibaldi's victories at Luino and Morazzone. However, Aguyar came into the public gaze mainly during the months of the Roman Republic's tenacious resistance - which turned out to be the last months of Aguyar's own life.

To a considerable degree, the beleaguered Roman Republic's struggle was waged in the international press as much as on the actual battlefield. Numerous journalists were present in Rome and reporting back to their countries, a large part of them openly sympathetic to the Italian Nationalist cause. In their reports Aguyar often figured, being given special attention as a single "exotic" Black man among Europeans.

"The Illustrated London News", which especially sent a reporter and an illustrator to cover the struggle in Rome, published on July 21, 1849, a drawing of Aguyar riding a horse behind Garibaldi, with the caption "Garibaldi and his negro servant". The attached report referred to Aguyar as "A fine fellow, his dress a red loose coat and a showy silk handkerchief tied loosely over his shoulders". The drawing (see above) also showed him wearing a hat with an ostrich feather, similar to the hat worn by Garibaldi himself in the same drawing

In the memoirs of international volunteers who joined Garibaldi, Aguyar is mentioned as a fellow-fighter of exceptional abilities. "A moor [moro] of vast proportions who had followed [Garibaldi] from America, in a black cloak with a lance garnished with a red pennant" was the description of the Swiss volunteer Von Hofstetter.

The Dutch painter Jan Koelman, also a volunteer with Garibaldi, wrote of "A Hercules of ebony colour, a freed slave who followed Garibaldi from Brazil (sic) and who astonished everyone in battle by throwing a lasso over enemy soldiers and pulling them off their horses" - a gaucho trick completely unfamiliar to European soldiers. More prosaically, he also used the lasso in order to collect riderless horses running around after a battle.

Aguyar also appeared in hostile caricatures published by a conservative Roman paper, which depicted Garibaldi as "a treacherous long haired brigand, followed by a large black man"

Though illiterate, Aguyar was considered highly skilful and competent, especially an accomplished horseman. He was reputed to have saved Garibaldi's life several times, at risk to his own. In one specific episode, during battle with soldiers of the Bourbon Kingdom of the Two Sicilies at Velletri, Aguyar saved Garibaldi when the commander was thrown of his horse and was in concrete danger of being captured.

Off the battlefield, Aguyar is mentioned as offering his saddle as a pillow for Garibaldi to sleep on during breaks in marching, and improvising an awning to protect him from the sun.

Aguyar also took care of Guerrillo, Garibaldi's three-legged dog who was saved and adopted after being hit by a stray bullet in the Battle of San Antonio in February 1846, and whom Garibaldi eventually took with him from Uruguay to Italy. Guerrillo was mentioned as "always running either under Garibaldi's horse or under Aguyar's (the dog's ultimate fate is unknown).

== Death ==
When the above-mentioned report and drawing appeared in The Illustrated London News, on July 21, 1849, the Roman Republic had already fallen and Aguyar - mentioned in the article as "now dead" - had fallen in its desperate last struggle.

With the French forces breaking into Rome on 30 June 1849, Andrea Aguyar - appointed a Lieutenant by Garibaldi in recognition of his abilities - was mortally wounded when hit by a shell near the Church of Santa Maria in Trastevere. Reportedly, while bleeding he managed to cry out: "Long Live the Republics of America and Rome!". He was carried into the Church of Santa Maria della Scala in the same neighbourhood, used at the time as a hospital, where he died.

His name is often linked with that of Luciano Manara, also killed on the same day.

The Italian commemorative web page "Andrea Aguyar, il Moro di Garibaldi" deplores the fact that there is no bust of Andrea Aguyar to be found among those of the fallen Garibaldian heroes placed on the Janiculum hill. However, a bust of him was placed there in May 2024. The name "Andrea il Moro" had earlier been given to a flight of stairs (scalea) in the region between the Trastevere and Monteverde parts of Rome, not far from where he was killed.

== See also ==
- List of enslaved people
