= George Housman Thomas =

British engraver, illustrator and painter (1824-1868)

George Housman Thomas (London, 17 December 1824 – Boulogne-sur-Mer, 21 July 1868), was a British wood-engraver, illustrator and painter.

== Life ==
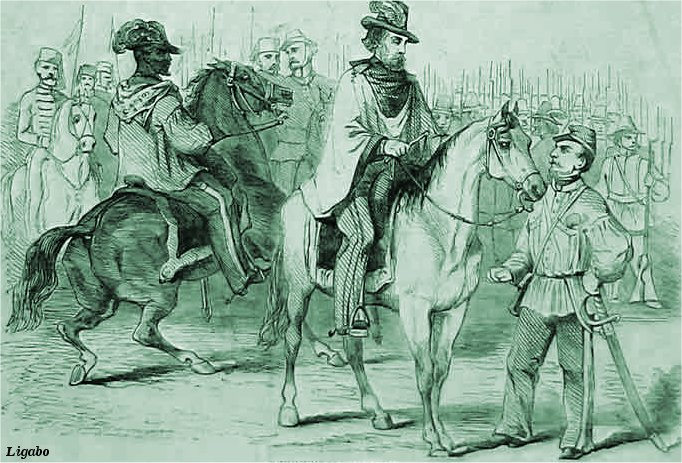
G H. Thomas: Andrea Aguyar riding behind Garibaldi, "Illustrated London News", 21 July 1849

He was born in London in 1824 and after an apprenticeship there with a wood engraver, George Bonner, he began work in Paris, first as an engraver, then as a draughtsman on wood. In 1846 he went to the United States to illustrate a New York City paper, and remained there for about two years. During this time he obtained a commission from the government of the United States to design banknotes. His health compelled him to return to Europe, and he went to Italy.

He was present at the siege of Rome by the French in 1849, and sent sketches of the siege to the Illustrated London News. After spending two years in Italy he returned to England.

Thomas resided in the boroughs of Kingston and Surbiton till illness caused his removal to Boulogne-sur-Mer, where he died on 21 July 1868. A collection of his works was exhibited in Bond Street in June 1869, and his sketches and studies were sold at Christie's in July 1872.

== Works ==
About 1850 Thomas produced a set of woodcuts for Stowe's Uncle Tom's Cabin. He also illustrated other books, including Longfellow's The Song of Hiawatha, Foxe's Book of Martyrs, and Trollope's Last Chronicle of Barset.

Thomas exhibited his first picture, St. Anthony's Day at Rome, at the British Institution in 1851. Garibaldi at Rome, painted from sketches made in 1849, was exhibited at the Royal Academy of Arts in 1854, and attracted much attention. His next picture was Ball at the Camp, Boulogne, 1856.

Thomas obtained the patronage of Queen Victoria, and painted the following pictures by her majesty's command:

- Distribution of Crimean Medals, 18 May 1855, 1858;
- Review in the Champ de Mars in Honour of Queen Victoria, 1859;
- Parade at Potsdam, 17 August 1858, 1860;
- Marriage of the Prince of Wales, Homage of the Princess Royal at the Coronation of the King of Prussia, and Marriage of the Princess Alice, 1863;
- The Queen and Prince Consort at Aldershot, 1859, 1866;
- The Children of Princess Alice, 1866;
- The Queen investing the Sultan of Turkey with the Order of the Garter, 1868, painted from a sketch by Princess Louise.

All these were exhibited at the Royal Academy in the years named. His other exhibits, military or domestic subjects, included Rotten Row (1862).

== Book illustrations ==
- Harriet Beecher Stowe, Uncle Tom's Cabin; or Life Among the Lowly: A Tale of Slave Life in America, with above one hundred and fifty illustrations, drawn by George Thomas, Esq., and T. R. Macquoid, Esq., and Engraved by William Thomas, Esq., London: Nathaniel Cooke, 1853 (a pirated English edition of the original)
  - Most of the illustration were reused without credits in Uncle Tom's Cabin; or, Life Among the Lowly, A New Edition, With Illustrations, and a Bibliography of the Work by George Bullen, Together with an Introductory Account of the Work. Boston: Houghton, Mifflin and Co., 1888
- Thomas Campbell, The Pleasures of Hope: With Other Poems, with illustrations by Myles Birkett Foster, George Thomas e Harrison Weir, Sampson Low and Son, London, 1855
- Oliver Goldsmith, The Vicar of Wakefield A Tale. Illustrated by George Thomas. London and New York: Sampson Low & Son; and Bangs, Brother, & Co. 1855
- Henry Wadsworth Longfellow, The Song of Hiawatha, W. Kent, 1860 (online from Google Book Search)
- Myles Birkett Foster, Household Song. Collection of lyrical pieces. With illustrations by B. Foster, G. H. Thomas, S. Palmer, etc., 1861
- Gilbert Percy, Piccalilli: a mixture, (illustrations by George Housman Thomas & Thomas R. Macquoid, engraved by Edmund Evans), London, Sampson Low Son & Co., 1862
- Anthony Trollope, Last Chronicle of Barset, Smith Elder, 1867 (online at Internet Archive)
- Thomas Moore, Lalla Rookh: an oriental romance, George Routledge and Sons, 1868
- The Life and Adventures of Dr. Livingston: in the interior of South Africa... Illustrated with portrait, map, and sixty engravings, etc., Henry Gardiner Adams, William Harvey, F. G. Sargent, George Houseman Thomas, J. Blackwood & Co., 1868
- Wilkie Collins, Armadale, in Cornhill Magazine, November 1864 - June 1866....
