= Vicar =

Ecclesiastical office

A vicar (/ˈvɪkər/; Latin: vicarius) is a representative, deputy or substitute; anyone acting "in the person of" or agent for a superior (compare "vicarious" in the sense of "at second hand"). Linguistically, vicar is cognate with the English prefix "vice", similarly meaning "deputy". It also refers to a senior priest in the Church of England. The title appears in a number of Christian ecclesiastical contexts, but also as an administrative title, or title modifier, in the Roman Empire. In addition, in the Holy Roman Empire, a local representative of the emperor, such as an archduke, could be styled "vicar".

== Catholic Church ==
The Pope bears the title vicar of Christ (Latin: Vicarius Christi).

In Catholic canon law, a vicar is the representative of any ecclesiastic entity. The Romans had used the term to describe officials subordinate to the praetorian prefects. In the early Christian churches, bishops likewise had their vicars, such as the archdeacons and archpriests, and also the rural priest, the curate who had the cure or care of all the souls outside the episcopal cities. The position of the Roman Catholic vicar as it evolved is sketched in the Catholic Encyclopedia (1908).

Vicars have various titles based on what role they are performing. An apostolic vicar is a bishop or priest who heads a missionary particular Church that is not yet ready to be a full diocese – he stands as the local representative of the Pope, in the Pope's role as bishop of all unorganized territories. A vicar capitular, who exercises authority in the place of the diocesan chapter, is a temporary ordinary of a diocese during a sede vacante period.

Vicars exercise authority as the agents of the bishop of the diocese. Most vicars, however, have ordinary power, which means that their agency is not by virtue of a delegation but is established by law. Vicars general, episcopal vicars, and judicial vicars exercise vicarious ordinary power; they each exercise a portion of the power of the diocesan bishop (judicial for the judicial vicar, executive for the others) by virtue of their office and not by virtue of a mandate.

A vicar forane, also known as an archpriest or dean, is a priest entrusted by the bishop with a certain degree of leadership in a territorial division of a diocese or a pastoral region known as a vicarate forane or a deanery.

A parochial vicar is a priest assigned to a parish in addition to, and in collaboration with, the parish priest or rector. He exercises his ministry as an agent of the parish's pastor, who is termed parochus in Latin. Some papal legates are given the title Vicar of the Apostolic See.

A vicar can be the priest of a "chapel of ease", a building within the parish which is not the parish church. Non-resident canons led also to the institution of vicars choral, each canon having his own vicar, who sat in his stall in his absence (see Cathedral).

In Opus Dei, a regional vicar is a priest designated to fulfil responsibilities for an entire country or region, such as France or the United States.

Within religious communities, the vicar is the secondary superior of the group, subject only to the Superior General, whether of an individual community or monastery, or of a wider jurisdiction, called, e.g., a Vicar Provincial. In these organizations, the office is filled by any member of the community, whether clergy or lay.

== Eastern Orthodox Church ==
In the Russian Orthodox Church and some other non-Hellenic Eastern Orthodox churches that historically follow Russian tradition, vicar (Russian: vikariy / викарий) is a term for what is known as suffragan bishop in the Anglican Communion or as auxiliary bishop in the Latin Church of the Catholic Church. A vicar bishop usually bears in his title the names of both his titular see (usually, a smaller town within the diocese he ministers in) and the see he is subordinate to. For example, Ignaty Punin, the vicar bishop under the Diocese of Smolensk, is titled "The Right Reverend Ignaty, the bishop of Vyazma, the vicar of the Diocese of Smolensk", Vyasma being a smaller town inside the territory of the Diocese of Smolensk. Normally, only large dioceses have vicar bishops, sometimes more than one. Usually, Russian Orthodox vicar bishops have no independent jurisdiction (even in their titular towns) and are subordinate to their diocesan bishops; though some of them de facto may have jurisdiction over some territories, especially when there is a need to avoid an overlapping jurisdiction.

In some other Eastern Orthodox churches the term "chorbishop" is used instead of "vicar bishop".

== Anglicanism ==
In Anglicanism, a vicar is a type of parish priest. Historically, parish priests in the Church of England were divided into vicars, rectors, and perpetual curates. The parish clergy and church were supported by tithes—like a local tax (traditionally, as the etymology of tithe suggests, of ten percent) levied on the personal as well as agricultural output of the parish. Roughly speaking, the distinction was that a rector directly received both the greater and lesser tithes of his parish while a vicar received only the lesser tithes (the greater tithes going to the lay holder, or impropriator, of the living); a perpetual curate with a small cure and often aged or infirm received neither greater nor lesser tithes, and received only a small salary (paid sometimes by the diocese). (See also in Church of England.) Today, the roles of a rector and a vicar are essentially the same. Which of the two titles is held by the parish priest is historical. Some parishes have a rector, others a vicar.

In the Episcopal Church in the United States of America, the positions of "vicar" and "curate" are not recognized in the canons of the entire church. However, some diocesan canons do define "vicar" as the priest in charge of a mission; and "curate" is often used for assistants, being entirely analogous to the English situation.

=== Vicarage ===
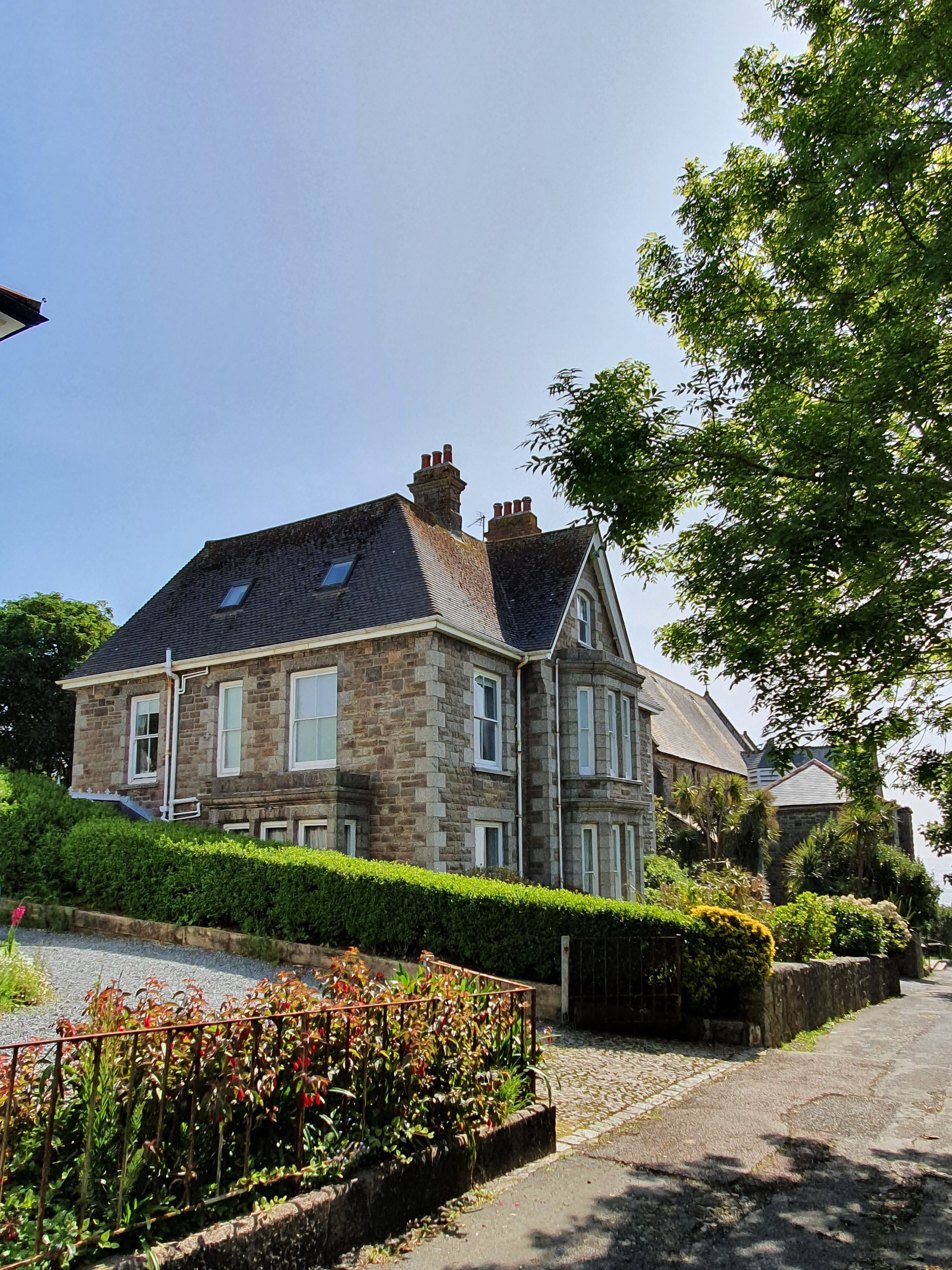
St John's Vicarage, Penzance, Cornwall

A vicarage, or vicarage house, is a residence provided by the church for the priest. They were usually located near the church and were sometimes quite elaborate and other times inadequate. Dating from medieval times, they were often rebuilt and modernized. In the second half of the 20th century, most large vicarages were replaced with more modern and simpler houses.

== Lutheran usage ==
In the Evangelical Lutheran Church in America, the Lutheran Church–Missouri Synod, the Lutheran Church–Canada, and the Wisconsin Evangelical Lutheran Synod, a vicar is a candidate for ordained pastoral ministry, serving in a vicariate or internship, usually in the third year of seminary training, though it can be delayed to the fourth year (this is often referred to as "a vicarage", a homonym of the residence of the Vicar). Typically at the end of the year of vicarage, the candidate returns to seminary and completes a final year of studies. After being issued a call or assignment, the candidate is ordained as a pastor in the ministry of Word and Sacrament. The role of a vicar in the Lutheran tradition is most comparable to that of a transitional deacon in the Anglican and Roman churches, except that Lutheran vicars are not ordained. In the Evangelical Lutheran Church in South Africa, a vicar is a person who has completed seminary training and is awaiting ordination while serving at a parish where the Diocesan Council places him or her.

The title Vikar, used in the Lutheran churches in Germany, is comparable while the Lutheran Church of Sweden calls it kyrkoherde ("church shepherd"), although that title is more comparable to a rector.

== In fiction ==
Oliver Goldsmith's novel The Vicar of Wakefield (1766) and Honoré de Balzac's The Curate of Tours (Le Curé de Tours; 1832) evoke the impoverished world of the 18th- and 19th-century vicar. Anthony Trollope's Chronicles of Barsetshire are peopled with churchmen of varying situations, from wealthy to impoverished; the income differences prompted a digression in Framley Parsonage (chapter 14) on the incomprehensible logic that made one vicar rich and another poor. The 18th-century satirical ballad "The Vicar of Bray" reveals the changes of conscience a vicar (whether of the Bray in Berkshire or of that in County Wicklow) might undergo in order to retain his meagre post, between the 1680s and 1720s. "The Curate of Ars" (usually in French: Le Curé d'Ars) is a style often used to refer to Saint Jean Vianney, a French parish priest canonized on account of his piety and simplicity of life.
