= Perpetual curate =

Anglican parish priest

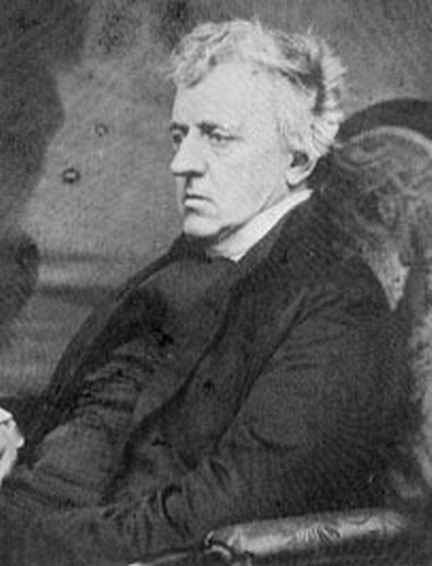
Charles Dodgson, perpetual curate of All Saints' Church, Daresbury in Cheshire; and father of C. L. Dodgson, otherwise known as Lewis Carroll. All Saints had been created as a perpetual curacy in 1536 out of a chapel-of-ease of nearby Norton Priory.

Perpetual curate was a class of resident parish priest or incumbent curate within the United Church of England and Ireland (name of the combined Anglican churches of England and Ireland from 1800 to 1871). The term is found in common use mainly during the first half of the 19th century. The legal status of perpetual curate originated as an administrative anomaly in the 16th century. Unlike ancient rectories and vicarages, perpetual curacies were supported by a cash stipend, usually maintained by an endowment fund, and had no ancient right to income from tithe or glebe.

In the 19th century, when large numbers of new churches and parochial units were needed in England and Wales politically and administratively, it proved much more acceptable to elevate former chapelries to parish status, or create ecclesiastical districts with new churches within ancient parishes, than to divide existing vicarages and rectories. Under the legislation introduced to facilitate this, the parish priests of new parishes and districts, were legally perpetual curates.

There were two particularly notable effects of this early 19th-century practice: compared to rectors and vicars of ancient parishes, perpetual curates tended to be of uncertain social standing; and also be much less likely to be adequately paid.

Perpetual curates disappeared from view in 1868, after which they could legally call themselves vicars, but perpetual curacies remained in law until the distinct status of perpetual curate was abolished by the Pastoral Measure 1968.

== Meaning ==
Perpetual in the title meant that, once licensed, they could not be removed by their nominating patron; and could only be deprived by their diocesan bishop through the ecclesiastical courts. Curate meant they were licensed by the diocesan bishop to provide "cure of souls" for the people of a district or parish.

All incumbents in England could, technically, have been considered perpetual curates. However, following the Gregorian reforms of the 11th century, parochial cure of souls in England became the freehold property of the incumbent; whose income in the forms of tithe and glebe constituted a benefice, and who then carried the title of rector.

== Origin of the post and characteristics ==
Parish churches in England originated in the 11th and 12th centuries as the personal property of (predominantly lay) patrons; who had the right to appoint and dismiss the parish priest, to receive an entrance fee on appointment, and to charge an annual rent thereafter. By the Gregorian reforms almost all these rights were extinguished for lay patrons, who were able only to retain the residual power to nominate the rector to a benefice, and many lay notables thereupon gave up parish churches into the ownership of religious houses, which were less inhibited by canon law from extracting fees and rents from rectors, and could moreover petition for exemptions by Papal dispensation. Initially it had not been unusual for religious houses in possession of rectories also to assume the capability to collect tithe and glebe income for themselves, but this practice was banned by the decrees of the Lateran Council of 1215. Thereafter, over the medieval period, monasteries and priories continually sought papal exemption from the Council's decrees, so as to appropriate the income of rectoral benefices to their own use. However, from the 13th century onwards, English diocesan bishops successfully established the principle that only the glebe and "greater tithes" of grain, hay and wood could be appropriated by monastic patrons in this manner; the "lesser tithes" had to remain within the parochial benefice; the incumbent of which thenceforward carried the title of "vicar". By 1535, of 8,838 rectories in England, 3,307 had thus been appropriated with vicarages; but at this late date, a small sub-set of vicarages in monastic ownership were not being served by beneficed clergy at all; monasteries having petitioned for papal dispensation from this obligation. In almost all such instances, these were parish churches in the ownership of houses of Augustinian or Premonstratensian canons, orders whose rules required them to provide parochial worship within their conventual churches; for the most part as chapels-of-ease of a more distant parish church. From the mid-fourteenth century onwards these canons were often able to extend this hybrid status to include vicarages in their possession, petitioning for papal privileges of appropriation allowing them to take the full tithe, while serving the cure either from among their own number or from secular stipendiary priests removable at will; arrangements which corresponded to those for their chapels of ease.

=== Post-reformation perpetual curacies ===
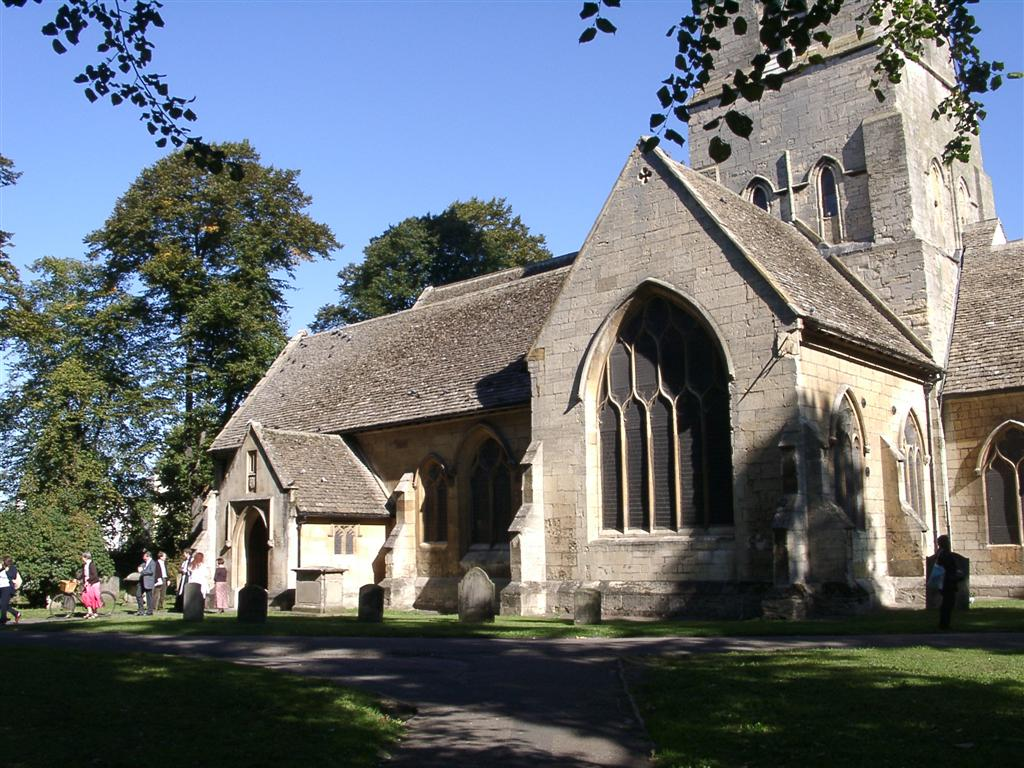
Cheltenham Minster, St Mary's an ancient parish church appropriated with a vicarage by Cirencester Abbey and, because unbeneficed at the dissolution in 1539, then continuing with a perpetual curacy until reunited with its rectory in 1863

It is this latter small group of parochial churches and chapels without beneficed clergy that, following the dissolution of the monasteries constituted the initial tranche of perpetual curacies. At the dissolution, rectors and vicars of most former monastically owned churches remained in place, their incomes unaffected. But for these unbeneficed churches and chapels-of-ease, lay purchasers of the canons' tithing rights could not themselves fulfil the spiritual obligations of a parochial cure, and nor was it considered proper that they appoint stipendiary priests for the function, as the canons had done. Instead lay purchasers of appropriated tithes, termed 'impropriators', were required in these instances both to nominate a clergyman to the diocesan bishop to serve the cure, and also to provide a fixed stipend of appropriate annual value to support the new perpetual curacy. In practice, most of the nominated incumbents to the new perpetual curacies were the canons or stipendiaries who had been serving those cures before the dissolution. Over the years, the arrangement by which the impropriator acted as both patron and paymaster of a perpetual curacy proved liable to break down, especially as the original cash stipend could be reduced to a small part of its former value through inflation. In some cases continued appointment to the cure was possible if the diocesan bishop was able to assume the responsibility of paymaster, having been provided with an enhanced portion of the tithe income from the parish or other endowment to do so. Otherwise, the impropriator might nominate a neighbouring incumbent to serve the cure; taking advantage of the fact that, as the curacy did not then count as a benefice, there was no legal barrier to its being held in plurality. As was also the case for the much larger numbers of inadequately funded rectories and vicarages, the continued provision of incumbents to serve perpetual curacies now depended on the living attracting additional endowments, a process that became much easier when perpetual curacies were brought within the terms of Queen Anne's Bounty in 1704.

=== Perpetual curacies in the nineteenth century ===
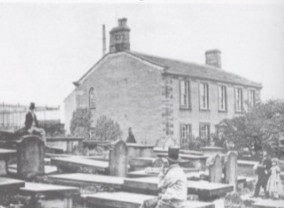
Haworth Parsonage built in 1774 as the parsonage house for the ancient chapelry of Haworth in the parish of Bradford, established as a perpetual curacy in 1820, at the appointment of Patrick Brontë

By the beginning of the nineteenth century there were 10,500 ancient parishes in England and Wales; their boundaries fixed, and until 1818, only able to be changed or split by private acts of Parliament. In addition, there were around 2,000 chapels of ease with defined parochial districts, mainly in the North of England; most of which were supported with more or less generous endowments administered by trustees. However, only 4,400 parishes had a resident incumbent, with the majority of the remaining parishes and chapelries being served by some 5,000 assistant curates; although many smaller neighbouring parishes had effectively been amalgamated as joint livings, and a number had been reconfigured as sinecures annexed in commendam to a bishopric or other senior clerical post. Around 1,000 parish cures were unprovided with any resident priest. One consequence of the Napoleonic Wars was a series of acts of Parliament giving bishops powers to compel absent incumbents to reside in their parishes; but it was acknowledged that this would create hardship amongst displaced assistant curates deprived of access to the more attractive cures. In this context, the status of perpetual curate began to appear less as a historical anomaly, and more as a potential solution. If chapels-of-ease, endowed with sufficient regular income, could be re-established as perpetual curacies; this would provide livings for displaced assistant curates, while greatly improving the quality of pastoral care provided to these cures. Crucially, there would be no need to change ancient parish boundaries or disrupt rights of tithe or glebe; while the incumbents of the ancient parish churches could continue as joint patrons with the trustees of the new perpetual curacies.

A much bigger problem was raised by rapidly expanding urban populations. Even with former ancient chapelries upgraded to perpetual curacies, there was still a gross under-provision of churches and parishes in industrial towns and cities; and a corresponding over-provision in many rural areas of the South East. A rapid expansion of urban parish numbers was required, and it was found that the status of perpetual curate (following its re-classification as a 'benefice') provided a readily available legal template for the creation of new incumbencies. Various Church Building Acts greatly increased the number of perpetual curacies by establishing new parishes and ecclesiastical districts; their incumbents paid initially with stipends from pew rents administered by the churchwardens under the supervision of dioceses, latterly more often from endowments vested with the Ecclesiastical Commissioners. Tithe and glebe from the locality continued to go to the lay impropriator or diocesan; or in the case of the newer perpetual curacies were retained by the ancient parish which had been divided to establish them. Where the new church had been established in a new ecclesiastical district the patron of the new living would normally be the incumbent of the ancient parish, while where the ancient parish had been split into new independent parishes then the patron of the ancient parish would normally be patron of all the new livings; but the legislation also allowed for donors of substantial endowments to acquire the patronage of new livings subject to the existing patron having first refusal. Further legislation abolished sinecure benefices and drastically restricted the permissible occasions for pluralism, compelling the decoupling of long-standing joint livings (including perpetual curacies) which did not qualify as exemptions. By 1864 less than 1,000 parish cures were being served by assistant curates; while numbers of perpetual curates had increased to over 4,000. From being viewed, at the beginning of the century, as the most favoured class of curates; perpetual curates had by the 1850s become the least favoured class of incumbents. Perpetual curacies had long been liable to remain poorly paid and inadequately housed relative to other full incumbencies of the Church of England, even when augmented from Queen Anne's Bounty; consequently the Perpetual Curate commonly features in mid-Victorian literary culture as a figure endeavouring to maintain the social standing of beneficed clergyman, but whose family aspirations (especially marital) were being frustrated by constricted financial expectations; most notably in The Perpetual Curate by Mrs Oliphant, and in The Last Chronicle of Barset by Anthony Trollope.

=== Legal status ===
In simple terms, every incumbent was either a rector, vicar or perpetual curate; but while this was a fully accurate summary of the relevant law within the Church of England, the creation of perpetual curacies had been an ad-hoc expedient at the dissolution of the monasteries, to provide ministers for existing worshipping congregations with the minimum of disturbance to long-standing spiritual and temporal property rights, other than the transfer of those rights out of the hands of the monks and into those of lay tenants and grantees. Where these congregations were in unbeneficed parishes, it is likely that few would otherwise have been able to provide a competent living for a vicar had they instead been restored as beneficed vicarages; where the congregations were in former priory churches or chapels, they could not otherwise have been endowed as parochial chapelries except at a financial cost to the rector of the parish. The expedient remained for three centuries a relatively rare exception to the general rule of parochial provision; not least because (unlike rectories or vicarages) perpetual curacies had no corporate personality, and hence endowments could not be settled on the office rather than the individual. This disability was remedied for some churches, when those perpetual curacies which qualified for augmentation from Queen Anne's Bounty were declared "perpetual benefices" and their incumbents bodies politic. All other perpetual curacies were reclassified as full benefices by the Pluralities Act 1838 (1 & 2 Vict. c. 106). This could be a two-edged sword however for those perpetual curacies, a substantial number, which had by this date become effectively annexed to a neighbouring vicarage or rectory, but which the Pluralities Acts required now to be served as an independent cure; often initially with wholly inadequate endowment and no parsonage house. Although thereafter a "beneficed clergyman", unlike a rector or vicar, a nineteenth or twentieth century perpetual curate was neither instituted to receive the spiritualities nor inducted into the temporalities, admission by episcopal licence rendered both ceremonies unnecessary.

=== The title: 'Vicar' ===
Those ancient parishes served by perpetual curates remained legally 'vicarages'; and hence the parsonage house was so designated. As was the case for parishes served by a vicar, the responsibility for providing the parsonage house of a perpetual curacy fell initially on the impropriator as lay rector, and in practice was almost always the farmhouse of the parish glebe. But, again as with vicars, the standard of housing expected for perpetual curates increased from the 18th century onwards; and it became necessary to provide a means by which loan finance could be made available to these incumbents for the construction of new parsonage houses, secured against the income of themselves and their successors. Such loans, through Queen Anne's Bounty or through the Ecclesiastical Commissioners, only became possible once perpetual curacies acquired the legal status of benefices. As they lived in a vicarage house, perpetual curates, especially those of nineteenth century creation, were commonly called "vicars"; but it was only in 1868 that the legal right to this style of title was conferred on them. From this date onwards the term 'perpetual curate' dropped out of current use, although continuing as a technical category in ecclesiastical law for another 100 years.

== Examples in fiction ==
There are inescapable parallels with The Hunting of the Snark, which, given Lewis Carroll's birth within the vicarage of a perpetual curacy, may well not be coincidental. In Anthony Trollope’s novel The Last Chronicle of Barset (1866), the inviolable position of Josiah Crawley, perpetual curate of the parish of Hogglestock, is a cause of dissent between Bishop Proudie and his domineering wife; Mrs Proudie believes Crawley to be guilty of theft and urges her husband to remove him, whereas the bishop knows that he has no power to do so without the authority of the ecclesiastical courts. In Season 4, Episode 3 of Lark Rise to Candleford, Burn Gorman plays a perpetual curate who causes scandal when he is seen leaving the Timmins cottage after dark while Robert Timmins is away.

== See also ==
- Curate, which explains the differences between the various uses of the term "curate"
- Priest in charge
- Margaret Oliphant, author of the novel The Perpetual Curate (1864)
