= The Small House at Allington =

1864 novel by Anthony Trollope

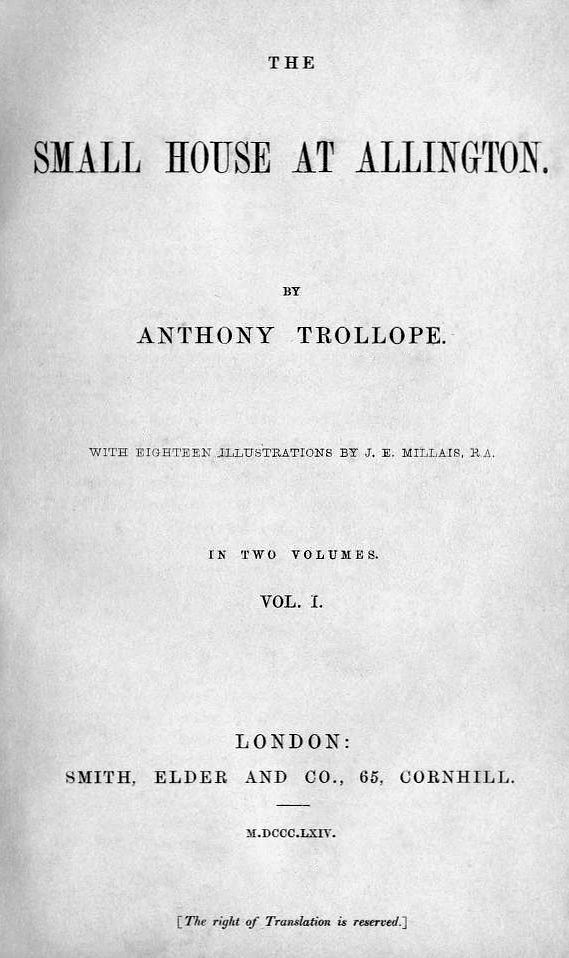
- Title page from the first edition in book form.
- Author: Anthony Trollope
- Illustrator: John Everett Millais
- Language: English
- Series: Chronicles of Barsetshire
- Publisher: Cornhill Magazine (serial); George Smith (book)
- Publication date: September 1862 – April 1864 (serial); April 1864 (book)
- Publication place: England
- Media type: Print (Serial, Hardback, and Paperback)
- Preceded by: Framley Parsonage (1861)
- Followed by: The Last Chronicle of Barset (1867)

The Small House at Allington is a novel by the English writer Anthony Trollope. It first appeared as a serial in the Cornhill Magazine, running from the July–December 1862 issue to the July–December issue of the following year. In 1864 it was published as an independent work in two volumes. It is the fifth book in the Chronicles of Barsetshire series, preceded by Framley Parsonage and followed by The Last Chronicle of Barset. It enjoyed a revival in popularity in the early 1990s when the British prime minister, John Major, declared it his favourite book.

== Plot summary ==
The Small House at Allington concerns the Dale family, who live in the "Small House", a dower house intended for the widowed mother of the owner of the estate. The landowner is the bachelor Squire of Allington, Christopher Dale. Dale's mother having died, he has allocated the Small House, rent-free, to the widow of his youngest brother and her daughters Isabella ("Bell") and Lilian ("Lily").

Bernard, the Squire's nephew (the son of his other late brother and hence his heir), brings his friend Adolphus Crosbie to Allington and introduces him to the family. Crosbie is handsome, and well regarded in London society. Bell and Lily are impressed by Crosbie's charm and worldliness; Lily, the younger and wittier sister, labels him an Apollo. She and Crosbie grow increasingly intimate during his stay, and before leaving he proposes to her. Mrs. Dale has no money for a dowry, but Crosbie thinks the Squire might make some provision for Lily, given that, in many ways, he treats her and Bell as if they were his daughters. When asked, the Squire informs him that he has no such intention, which leads Crosbie to reflect that, whereas his salary as a clerk at the General Committee Office allows him to live comfortably as a bachelor, if he were to marry, and have a family to support, they would have to live very humbly. The engagement is made public and celebrated in Allington, but when Lily learns of Crosbie's misunderstanding regarding her possible fortune, she offers to break off the engagement with no hard feelings. Crosbie refuses, because he is impressed by this noble gesture and is genuinely fond of Lily.

From Allington, Crosbie goes to Courcy Castle. Once he is back among people of high society, Crosbie's image of married life with Lily on his small salary grows bleaker. Rumours of his engagement have reached the Castle, but Crosbie evades questions about it. Thus, the Countess de Courcy views him as a viable match for her one single daughter still of marriageable age, Alexandrina, who had previously struck up a friendship with Crosbie in London. Pressed by Alexandrina, in a moment of weakness he asks her to marry him. The Countess makes sure that the engagement is firmly settled between Crosbie and the Earl before the former leaves. Crosbie immediately begins to have second thoughts; he is now engaged to two women, and although he prefers Lily (who is younger, prettier and more intelligent), she is a country girl whom he can jilt with few repercussions, whereas Alexandrina is the daughter of a prominent family. He writes a letter to Lily and Mrs. Dale, breaking off the engagement. Ironically, he is given a rise in salary almost as soon as he returns to London, and he muses that he could after all have had a comfortable, happy life married to Lily.

Lily is heartbroken, but puts on a brave face, claiming she is happy for Crosbie and Alexandrina. However, she refuses to entertain the idea of marrying another man and so rejects repeated proposals from Johnny Eames, a family friend who has loved Lily since childhood (and who first confesses his feelings to her when he hears of her engagement). Eames is a lowly clerk in the Income Tax Office, but his expectations rise after he saves the Earl de Guest from a bull. After the incident, Eames becomes a close friend of the childless earl and his spinster sister, Lady Julia de Guest. The Earl takes an interest in Johnny's career and effectively adopts him. When Eames encounters Crosbie at a London railway station, he assaults him and gives him a black eye. Mrs. Dale, the Squire, Lord de Guest and Lady Julia all hope Lily will eventually agree to marry Johnny, but she remains true to the memory of her Apollo, as she does not love Eames in the way she had loved Crosbie.

Meanwhile, Christopher Dale, the Squire, encourages Bernard to court Bell, as he would be happy to see his niece and nephew marry and live together on the family estate. Bell, however, thinks of Bernard as a brother. When Mrs. Dale and her daughters feel Christopher is pressuring Bell to marry Bernard, they announce that they will leave the Small House so that they will no longer be beholden to him. The Squire persuades them to stay, and gives both girls a sum of money regardless of whom they marry or if they marry at all. Bell eventually marries John Crofts, the young doctor in the area; they have had feelings for each other since she was a young girl.

Crosbie quickly learns that he has little to gain from marrying into the de Courcy family. When he returns to London, his future sister-in-law Amelia keeps a close eye on him, and the Countess, together with Amelia's attorney husband Gazebee, bind all Crosbie's finances to the marital estate and make him pay for a furnished home in a respectable neighbourhood in order to keep up appearances. Neither Crosbie nor Alexandrina is happy with their married life, and less than four months after the wedding Alexandrina leaves with her mother to live in the spa town of Baden-Baden, Germany. Crosbie gladly pays to regain his freedom.

== Characters ==
=== The Dales ===
- Squire Christopher Dale, owner of the unentailed estate of Allingtonin, who, unmarried and childless, named his nephew Bernard as his heir
- Mrs. Mary Dale, the Squire's widowed sister-in-law, who, despite the Squite's ill-disguised antipathy to her, consented to live at the Small House for the sake of her daughters
- Isabella 'Bell' Dale the elder sister and favourite niece of the Squire, who falls in love with Dr. Crofts
- Lilian 'Lily' Dale the younger sister, more impulsive and boisterous than Bell, who is admired by John Eames but who falls irretrievably in love with Adolphus Crosbie
- Captain Bernard Dale, nephew and heir of the estate of Allington, who is expected by the Squire to marry Bell Dale

=== Their lovers ===
- Adolphus Crosbie, a friend of Bernard who becomes engaged to Lily Dale but who jilts her in favour of Lady Alexadrina de Courcy
- John Eames, a 'hobbledehoy' who has not yet attained manhood, who works as a clerk in the income-tax office, and who has loved Lily Dale since childhood
- Dr. James Crofts, a physician with a small practice in Guestwick and a meager income, who considers himself unable to support a wife on his meager income

=== The de Courcys ===
- Earl de Courcy, an ageing aristocratic, near destitute, but unable to exercise economy
- Lady de Courcy, working to marry off her youngest daughter Alexandrina to Adolphus Crosbie
- Lady Alexandrina de Courcy, the youngest daughter, who aims to marry Adolphus Crosbie in spite of his engagement to Lily Dale
- Lady Amelia Gazebee, née de Courcy, eldest daughter, married to the attorney Mr. Gazebee
- Mortimer Gazebee, an attorney who ties up Crosbie's income in marriage settlements and life insurance payments
- Lord Porlock, eldest son and heir to the Earl de Courcy, at odds with his father over a dishonoured annuity
- The Honourable George de Courcy, a younger son, who married beneath his social class for economic advantage
- The Honourable John de Courcy, a younger son, a débauché
- Ladies Rosina and Margaretta de Courcy, daughters, both unmarried

=== At Guestwick ===
- Earl Theodore de Guest, an unmarried, childless aristocratic who takes John Eames under his wing, uncle of Bernard Dale on his mother's side
- Lady Julia de Guest, the unmarried sister of the Earl de Guest, who issues warnings over Crosbie's betrayal of Lily
- Mrs. Eames and Mary Eames, John Eames's mother and sister

=== In London ===
- Mrs. Roper, owner of a boarding house where John Eames resides
- Amelia Roper, daughter of Eames's landlady, with whom he becomes romantically entangled
- Joseph Cradell, Mr. and Mrs. Lupex, and Mrs. Spruce, residents of Mrs. Roper's boarding house
- Fowler Pratt, Crosbie's friend and confidant
- Sir Raffle Buffle, the preposterous head of the income-tax office

== Criticism ==
Julia Kuehn has written of the novel being "off-course" in terms of characters' actions against their own self interests. Trollope's response to the problem of social accountability in the novel has been discussed by Jennifer Preston Wilson.

== Adaptations ==
- The Small House at Allington-BBC Radio.
- The Small House at Allington-BBC TV Series, 1960.
