= Andrew Hook =

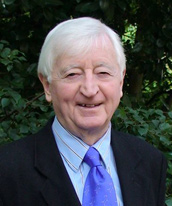
- Andrew Hook
- Born: 1932 or 1933
- Died: 26 November 2024

Academic background
- Education: University of Edinburgh (BA) University of Princeton (PhD)

Academic work
- Discipline: English Literature
- Institutions: University of Glasgow

Andrew Hook, FBA, FRSE, was emeritus Bradley Professor of English Literature at the University of Glasgow.

Having graduated from the University of Edinburgh in 1954, he completed national service and went on to graduate study at Manchester and Princeton universities. He received his doctorate from Princeton in 1960. His teaching career divided almost equally into a decade at the University of Edinburgh, a decade at the University of Aberdeen, and almost two decades at the University of Glasgow. Since retiring from the University of Glagow he has been a visiting fellow at the Princeton University English Department and has subsequently taught at Dartmouth College, the College of Wooster in Ohio, and St. Thomas University in Minneapolis—St. Paul. Throughout his career he has taught courses in English, Scottish and American literature.

He became a Fellow of The Royal Society of Edinburgh in 2000. He became a Fellow of the British Academy in 2002.

== Personal life ==
Hook died on 26 November 2024, at the age of 91. At the time, he had a son and one granddaughter.

== Publications ==
Editor, ‘The Novel Today’, International Writers’ Conference, Edinburgh International Festival, 1962.

Scott's Waverley, edited with Introduction, Notes and Glossary, the Penguin English Library, 1972.

Charlotte Brontë's Shirley, edited (with Judith Hook) with Introduction and Notes, the Penguin English Library, 1974.

John Dos Passos, Twentieth Century Views, edited with an Introduction, Prentice-Hall, Englewood Cliffs, N. J.. 1974.

Scotland and America: A Study of Cultural Relations 1750-1835, Blackie, Glasgow and London, 1975. 2nd Edition, Humming Earth, Glasgow, 2008.

American Literature in Context 1865-1900. Methuen, London and New York, 1983.

History of Scottish Literature, Vol. II 1660-1800, editor and contributor, Aberdeen University Press, 1987.

F. Scott Fitzgerald, Edward Arnold, London, 1992.

The Glasgow Enlightenment, edited with Richard Sher, Tuckwell Press, East Linton, 1995.

From Goosecreek to Gandercleugh: Studies in Scottish-American Literary and Cultural History, Tuckwell Press, East Linton, 1999.

Scott’s The Fair Maid of Perth, edited with Donald Mackenzie, the Edinburgh Edition of the Waverley Novels, Edinburgh University Press, 1999.

F. Scott Fitzgerald: A Literary Life. Palgrave Macmillan, London, 2002.

Francis Jeffrey’s American Journal: New York to Washington 1813, edited with Clare Elliott, Humming Earth, Glasgow, 2011.

Editor, A Mississippi Diary, Eliza Oddy, The Grimsay Press, Kilkerran, 2013.

From Mount Hooly to Princeton: A Scottish-American Medley, Kennedy & Boyd, Edinburgh, 2020.

Professor Hook has also written a range of chapters in books and essays in collections.
