= Henry Eliot (author) =

British author

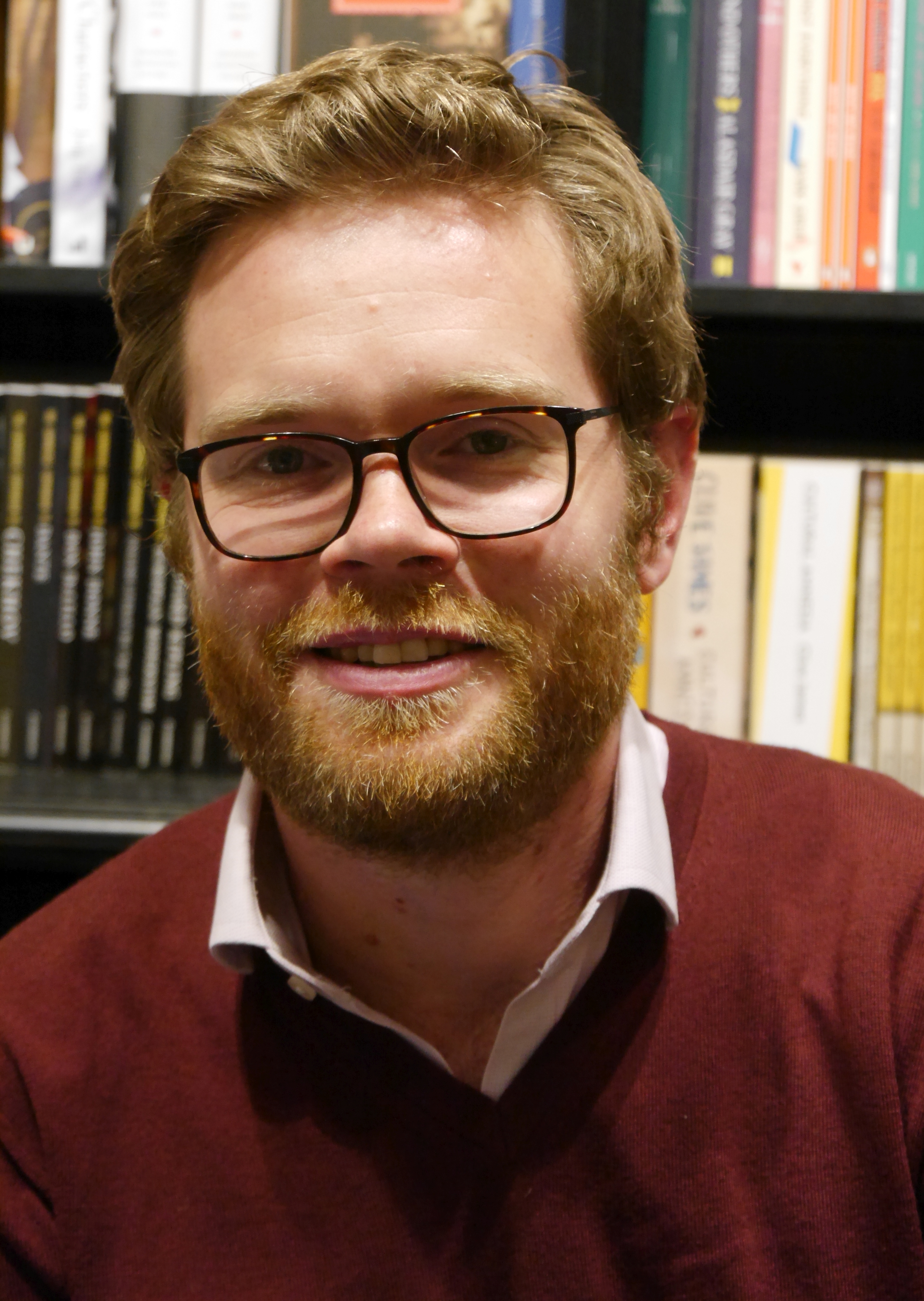
Eliot, Hatchards, London, 2022

Henry Eliot is a British author.

Eliot's first book, Curiocity, grew out of a 2009 six edition map-magazine of the same title. The Guardian said that " its delight in trivia is infectious". The Evening Standard called it "endlessly fascinating". The Times Literary Supplement noted its "fresh flashes of insight".

Eliot has produced two volumes on Penguin books, The Penguin Classics Book, and The Penguin Modern Classics Book, particularly focusing on jacket design.

== Publications ==
- Curiocity, Particular, 2016 (with Matt Lloyd-Rose)
- The Penguin Classics Book, 2019
- The Penguin Modern Classics Book, 2021
