= Roger Sharrock =

Roger Ian Sharrock (23 August 1919 – 27 December 1990) was a British literary scholar noted for his works on John Bunyan and the Romantic poets. The journal Bunyan Studies called him "the best known and most distinguished Bunyan scholar of the twentieth century".

== Early life and academic career ==
Sharrock was educated at Queen Elizabeth Grammar School, Wakefield and St John's College, Oxford. During the Second World War he served in the King's Own Yorkshire Light Infantry, from 1939 to 1941. In 1946 he was appointed lecturer in English at University College, Southampton and as reader in 1962. In 1963 he became professor of English at Durham University and in 1968 he was appointed professor of English language and literature at King's College London, a post he held until his retirement in 1981.

Sharrock edited John Bunyan's works for the Oxford University Press and organised the publication of the Miscellaneous Works of Bunyan, which appeared in 12 volumes and for the first time provided reliable texts of 60 of Bunyan's works. He also wrote about the Romantic poets, focusing on William Wordsworth's early poetry. He was chairman of the English Association from 1972 to 1979.

== Personal life ==
He married and had a son and two daughters. Sharrock converted to Catholicism in 1951.

== Works ==
=== Books ===
- Songs and Comments (London: The Fortune Press, 1946).
- John Bunyan (London: Hutchinson's University Library, 1954).
- Life and Story in The Pilgrim's Progress (London: Dr. William's Trust, 1978).
- Saints, Sinners and Comedians: The Novels of Graham Greene (Tunbridge Wells, Kent: Burns & Oates, University of Notre Dame Press, 1984).

=== Articles ===
- 'Bunyan and the English Emblem Writers', The Review of English Studies, Vol. 21, No. 82 (April 1945), pp. 105-116.
- 'Spiritual Autobiography in The Pilgrim's Progress', The Review of English Studies, Vol. 24, No. 94 (April 1948), pp. 102-120.
- 'The Imperfections of Criticism', Blackfriars, Vol. 35, No. 410 (May 1954), pp. 209-215.
- 'Try to say what happened in your own words', Blackfriars, Vol. 36, No. 420 (March 1955), p. 66.
- 'The Origin of A Relation of the Imprisonment of Mr. John Bunyan', The Review of English Studies, 2, Vol. 10, No. 39 (August 1959), pp. 250-256.
- 'The Chemist and the Poet: Sir Humphry Davy and the Preface to Lyrical Ballads', Notes and Records of the Royal Society of London, Vol. 17, No. 1 (May 1962), pp. 57-76.
- 'Fables and Symbols—I', New Blackfriars, Vol. 50, No. 585 (February 1969), pp. 233-240.
- 'Fables and Symbols—II', New Blackfriars, Vol. 50, No. 586 (March 1969), pp. 285-290.
- ‘The Prelude: The Poet's Journey to the Interior’, English, Vol. XIX, No. 103 (Spring 1970), pp. 1-6.
- 'Coleridge and Abstruse Research', Theoria: A Journal of Social and Political Theory, No. 59 (October 1982), pp. 1-19.
- '"The Life and Death of Mr. Badman": Facts and Problems', The Modern Language Review, Vol. 82, No. 1 (January 1987), pp. 15-29.
