= Wordsworth Editions =

British publisher

- Founded: 1987
- Founder: Helen Trayler, Michael Trayler
- Successor: Nichola Trayler
- Country of origin: United Kingdom
- Distribution: CBS Book Services (UK); L.B.May & Associates (US); Peribo (Australia)
- Publication types: Books
- Fiction genres: classic literature
- Official website: wordsworth-editions.com

Wordsworth Editions is a British publisher known for their low-cost editions of classic literature and non-fiction works.

The firm was founded by Helen Trayler and Michael Trayler in 1987. The firm began to sell paperbacks at £1 in 1992. The firm has approximately 500 titles in print. The firm is family-owned and based in Ware, Hertfordshire, England. As of 2017, 45% of its sales were exported.
