= Framley Parsonage =

1861 novel by Anthony Trollope

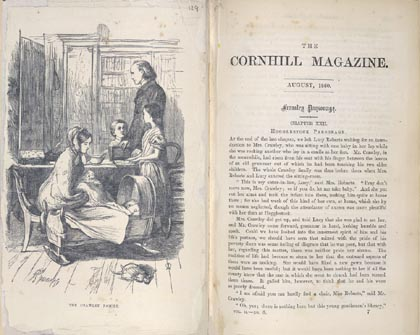
- First page (with illustration) of the first appearance of Framley Parsonage in print, in Cornhill Magazine, 1860–1861.
- Author: Anthony Trollope
- Illustrator: John Everett Millais
- Language: English
- Series: Chronicles of Barsetshire
- Publisher: Cornhill Magazine (serial); George Smith (book)
- Publication date: January 1860 – April 1861 (serial); April 1861 (book)
- Publication place: England
- Media type: Print (Serial, Hardback, and Paperback)
- ISBN: 978-1-68204-158-1
- Preceded by: Doctor Thorne
- Followed by: The Small House at Allington
- Text: Framley Parsonage at Wikisource

Framley Parsonage is a novel by English author Anthony Trollope. It was first published in serial form in the Cornhill Magazine in 1860, then in book form in April 1861. It is the fourth book in the Chronicles of Barsetshire series, preceded by Doctor Thorne and followed by The Small House at Allington.

== Synopsis ==
The hero of Framley Parsonage, Mark Robarts, is a young vicar, settled in the village of Framley in Barsetshire with his wife and children. The living has come into his hands through Lady Lufton, the mother of his childhood friend Ludovic, Lord Lufton. Mark has ambitions to further his career and begins to seek connections in the county's high society. He is soon preyed upon by local Whig Member of Parliament Mr Sowerby, who asks him to guarantee a substantial loan, which in a moment of weakness Mark agrees to do, even though he does not have the means to meet the loan amount if called upon to redeem it, and knows Sowerby to be a notorious debtor. The consequences of this blunder play a major role in the plot, with Mark eventually being publicly humiliated when bailiffs arrive and begin to take an inventory of the Robarts' furniture. At the last moment, Lord Lufton forces the reluctant Mark to accept a loan from him to meet the debt.

Another plot line deals with the romance between Mark's sister Lucy and Lord Lufton. The couple are deeply in love and the young man proposes, but Lady Lufton is against the marriage. She would prefer that her son instead choose the coldly beautiful Griselda Grantly, daughter of Archdeacon Grantly, and fears that Lucy is too "insignificant" for such a high position. Lucy herself recognises the great gulf between their social positions and declines the proposal. When Lord Lufton persists, she agrees only on condition that Lady Lufton ask her to accept her son. Lucy's conduct and charity (especially towards the family of poor priest Josiah Crawley) weaken her ladyship's resolve. In addition, Griselda becomes engaged to Lord Dumbello. But it is the determination of Lord Lufton that in the end vanquishes his doting mother.

The book ends with Lucy and Ludovic's marriage as well as three other marriages. Two of these involve the daughters of Bishop Proudie and Archdeacon Grantly. The rivalry between Mrs Proudie and Mrs Grantly over their matrimonial ambitions forms a significant comic subplot, with the latter triumphant. The other marriage is that of the outspoken heiress, Martha Dunstable, to Doctor Thorne, the eponymous hero of the preceding novel in the series.

== Characters ==
=== The Luftons ===
- Lady Lufton, the widowed peeress of Framley Court and patroness of Mark Robarts.
- Ludovic, Lord Lufton. Her only son and heir.

=== The Robartses ===
- Reverend Mr Mark Robarts, the Vicar of Framley, a protégé of Lady Lufton and hero of the novel.
- Fanny, Mrs Robarts, née Monsell, Mark's even-tempered and loyal wife, chosen for him by Lady Lufton.
- Miss Lucy Robarts, Mark's youngest sister and the love interest of Lord Lufton.

=== The Merediths ===
- Sir George Meredith, the husband of Justinia Lufton.
- Justinia, Lady Meredith, née Lufton, sister of Lord Lufton, wife of Sir George Meredith and daughter of Lady Lufton.

=== The Grantlys ===
- Dr Theophilus Grantly, Archdeacon of Barchester, who lives at Plumstead Episcopi.
- Mrs Susan Grantly, née Harding, the wife of Dr Grantly.
- Griselda Grantly, the eldest daughter of the Grantlys, a classical and "statuesque" beauty who speaks little.

=== The Proudies ===
- Dr Proudie, the Bishop of Barchester.
- Mrs Proudie, the domineering wife of the Bishop.
- Miss Olivia Proudie, their eldest daughter.

=== The Crawleys ===
- Rev. Josiah Crawley, the impoverished but proud clergyman of Hogglestock.
- Mrs Mary Crawley, his wife, and their four children

=== The Smiths ===
- Harold Smith, Member of Parliament and for a short while, a Cabinet Minister.
- Mrs Harriet Smith, wife of Harold Smith, sister of Nathaniel Sowerby and close friend of Miss Martha Dunstable.

=== Others ===
- Francis "Frank" Newbold Gresham, junior, the rich squire of Boxhall Hill and son of Mr Gresham of Greshamsbury
- Mrs Mary Gresham, the niece of Dr Thorne, a wealthy heiress
- Dr Arabin, the Dean of Barchester, a friend of Mr Crawley
- Mrs Eleanor Arabin, née Harding, his wife, sister of Mrs Grantly
- Nathaniel Sowerby, a Member of Parliament who cajoles Mark Robarts into recklessly guaranteeing a three-month bill of Sowerby's for £400 (making Mark liable if Sowerby does not pay the debt) and a subsequent further bill for £500. He is the brother of Mrs Smith.
- Dr Thomas Thorne, a doctor and apothecary, the uncle of Mary Gresham
- Duke of Omnium, a powerful Whig politician and the main creditor of Sowerby. Political opponent of the Conservative Lady Lufton.
- Martha Dunstable, a kindhearted and wealthy heiress, inheritor of the "oil of Lebanon" pharmaceutical business
- Lord Dumbello, the heir apparent to a marquisate and a suitor of Griselda Grantly
- Mr. Supplehouse, a journalist, intimate friend of Nathaniel Sowerby, and a Member of Parliament

== Author's description and other criticism ==
In his autobiography, Trollope described Framley Parsonage: "The story was thoroughly English. There was a little fox-hunting and a little tuft-hunting, some Christian virtue and some Christian cant. There was no heroism and no villainy. There was much Church, but more love-making."

The Literary Gazette of 1861 saw the book as marking the eclipse of Byronism in the literary world, and its replacement by what it called “accurate and faithful portraits of mediocre respectability.”

20th century criticism would confirm the accuracy of Trollope's representation of the habits and mores of his mid-Victorian middle-class world in Framley Parsonage, whilst also hinting the work perhaps suffered from the (necessary) haste involved in its serial composition.
