= 1855 in literature =

This article contains information about the literary events and publications of 1855.

== Events ==
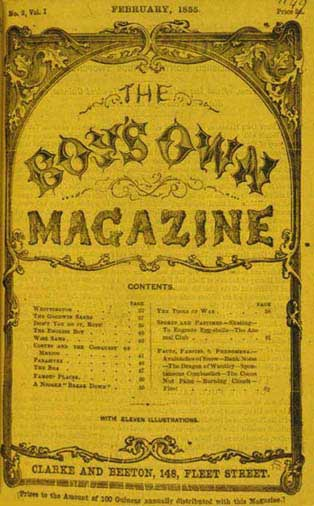
Samuel O. Beeton's The Boys' Own Magazine, published in the UK from 1855 to 1890, was the first and most influential boys' magazine.

- January – Samuel Orchart Beeton's weekly The Boys' Own Magazine, "an illustrated journal of fact, fiction, history and adventure", begins publication in London.
- January 5 – Anthony Trollope's novel The Warden, the first entry of his novel series Chronicles of Barsetshire, is published in London by Longman as he begins to write the second, Barchester Towers. While the novel was not a huge success, Trollope felt that he had received more recognition for it than for any of his previous works.The series is set in the fictional English county of Barsetshire and its cathedral city of Barchester. The novels concern the dealings of the clergy and the gentry, and the political, amatory, and social manoeuvrings among them.
- February 25 – The comedy De Scholtschäin, by Edmond de la Fontaine writing as Dicks, becomes the first play to be performed in the language of Luxembourg.
- June 29 – The English newspaper The Daily Telegraph begins publication in London.. It was founded by Arthur B. Sleigh, in order to air his personal grievances against Prince George, Duke of Cambridge.
- July 4 – Walt Whitman's first edition of his book of poems titled Leaves of Grass is published in Brooklyn, New York. After self-publishing this edition in 1855, Whitman spent most of his professional life writing, revising, and expanding the collection until his death in 1892. Either six or nine separate editions of the book were produced, depending on how one defines a new edition. This poetry book was notable for its discussion of delight in sensual pleasures at a time when such candid displays were considered immoral. The book was highly controversial for its explicit sexual imagery, and Whitman was subject to derision by many contemporary critics.
- September 27 – Alfred Tennyson reads from his new book Maud and other poems at a social gathering in the home of Robert and Elizabeth Browning in London. Dante Gabriel Rossetti makes a sketch of him doing so.
- October – Victor Hugo moves to Hauteville House, Saint Peter Port, Guernsey, in the Channel Islands, accompanied by his mistress, Juliette Drouet.
- December
  - Charles Dickens publishes the first instalment of Little Dorrit, which continues to appear into 1857.
  - Thomas Babington Macaulay's best-selling History of England in four volumes is completed.
- unknown dates
  - Alexander Afanasyev begins publication of his collection of Narodnye russkie skazki [National Russian Tales].
  - John Camden Hotten opens a bookselling business in London, which is the origin of the publisher Chatto & Windus.
  - Faris al-Shidyaq publishes the metafiction Sâq 'ala al-sâq (Leg over Leg), the first modern Arabic novel, in Paris.
  - The first Luxembourg novel in French, Marc Bruno, profil d'artiste, is published shortly after the death of its author, Félix Thyes (born 1830).
  - Belarusian writer Vintsent Dunin-Martsinkyevich publishes «Гапон» (Hapon) in the Russian Empire, the first poem written wholly in modern Belarusian.

== New books ==
=== Fiction ===
- Gheorghe Asachi – Ziua din urmă a municipiului Iașenilor (The Last Day of Iași Municipality)
- Dimitrie Bolintineanu – Manoil
- Cuthbert Bede (pseudonym) – The Adventures of Mr. Verdant Green (other volumes, 1856 and 1857)
- Gustav Freytag – Debit and Credit (Soll und Haben)
- Elizabeth Gaskell – North and South
- James Grant – The Yellow Frigate (also entitled The Three Sisters)
- Mary Virginia Hawes – The Hidden Path
- Caroline Lee Hentz – Robert Graham
- Paul Heyse – "L'Arrabbiata" (The Fury, short story)
- Washington Irving – Wolfert's Roost
- Gottfried Keller – Green Henry (Der grüne Heinrich)
- Charles Kingsley – Westward Ho!
- Herman Melville
  - Israel Potter
  - The Paradise of Bachelors and the Tartarus of Maids
  - Benito Cereno
- Gérard de Nerval – Aurelia
- Giovanni Ruffini – Doctor Antonio
- Ann Sophia Stephens – The Old Homestead
- William Makepeace Thackeray – The Newcomes
- Félix Thyes – Marc Bruno, profil d'artiste
- Anthony Trollope – The Warden (first in the Chronicles of Barchester series of six books)

=== Children ===
- Božena Němcová – The Grandmother

=== Drama ===
- Émile Augier – Le Mariage d'Olympe
- Dicks
  - De Scholtschäin
  - D'Mumm Sèiss
- Léon Gozlan – Le Gâteau des reines
- Henrik Ibsen – The Feast at Solhaug
- Andreas Munch – En Aften paa Giske
- Watts Phillips – Joseph Chavigny
- Ivan Turgenev – A Month in the Country (published as Two Women)

=== Poetry ===
- Henry Wadsworth Longfellow – The Song of Hiawatha
- Walt Whitman – Leaves of Grass

=== Non-fiction ===
- David Brewster – Memoirs of the Life, Writings and Discoveries of Sir Isaac Newton
- John Brown – Slave Life in Georgia
- Pedro Carolino – O novo guia da conversação em portuguez e inglez (translated as English as She is Spoke)
- Frederick Douglass – "My Bondage and My Freedom"
- Washington Irving – The Life of George Washington, Volumes 1 and 2
- George Sand – Histoire de ma vie (The Story of My Life)
- William Smith – Latin–English Dictionary based upon the works of Forcellini and Freund
- Leo Tolstoy – Sevastopol Sketches (Севастопольские рассказы, Sevastopolskiye rasskazy)
- Alfred Russel Wallace – "On the Law Which has Regulated the Introduction of Species" (in Annals and Magazine of Natural History, September)

== Births ==
- February 21 – Elizabeth Robins Pennell, American biographer and critic based in London (died 1936)
- April 4 – Manonmaniam Sundaram Pillai, Indian dramatist (died 1897)
- April 27 – Margaret Wolfe Hungerford, Irish novelist (died 1897)
- May 1 – Marie Corelli (Mary Mackay), English novelist (died 1924)
- May 14 – Eduard von Keyserling, Baltic German fiction writer and dramatist (died 1918)
- May 21 – Emile Verhaeren, Belgian Symbolist poet writing in French (died 1916)
- May 24 – Sir Arthur Wing Pinero, English dramatist (died 1934)
- July 7 – Ludwig Ganghofer, German novelist (died 1920)
- July 19 – Alexander Ertel, Russian novelist and short story writer (died 1908)
- August 7 – Stanley J. Weyman, English novelist (died 1928)
- September 12 – William Sharp, Scottish poet and biographer (died 1905)
- September 22 – Alice Zimmern, English writer, translator and suffragist (died 1939)
- October 26 – Jessie Wilson Manning, American author and lecturer (died 1947)
- October 30 – Pyotr Gnedich, Russian writer and poet (died 1925)
- November 4 – William Ritchie Sorley, Scottish philosopher (died 1935)
- December 15 – Maurice Bouchor, French poet and sculptor (died 1929)
- December 28 – Juan Zorrilla de San Martín, Uruguayan poet (died 1931)
- unknown date
  - Solomon Cleaver, Canadian story teller, novelist and pastor (died 1939)
  - Florence Huntley, American journalist, editor, humorist and occult author (died 1912)

== Deaths ==
- January 3 – János Majláth, Hungarian poet and historian (born 1786)
- January 10 – Mary Russell Mitford, English dramatist and novelist (born 1787)
- January 25 – Dorothy Wordsworth, English poet and diarist (born 1771)
- January 26 – Gérard de Nerval (Gérard Labrunie), French poet and essayist (suicide, born 1808)
- February 4 – Gottfried Christian Friedrich Lücke, German theologian (born 1791)
- March 31 – Charlotte Brontë, English novelist and poet (born 1816)
- June 29 – Delphine de Girardin, French poet and novelist (born 1804)
- July 12 – Karl Spindler, German novelist, (born 1796)
- September 4 – Emma Tatham, English poet (born 1829)
- September 27 – John Adamson, English antiquary and scholar of Portuguese (born 1787)
- November 11 – Søren Kierkegaard, Danish philosopher (born 1813)
- November 19 – Mihály Vörösmarty, Hungarian poet and dramatist (born 1800)
- November 26 – Adam Mickiewicz, Poland's national poet (cholera, born 1798)
- December 3 – Robert Montgomery, English poet (born 1807)
- unknown date – Sunthorn Phu, Thai poet (born 1786)

== Sources ==
- Miller, James E. Jr. (1962). Walt Whitman. New York: Twayne Publishers. LCCN 62013674 – via Internet Archive.
