= The Three Clerks =

1857 novel by Anthony Trollope

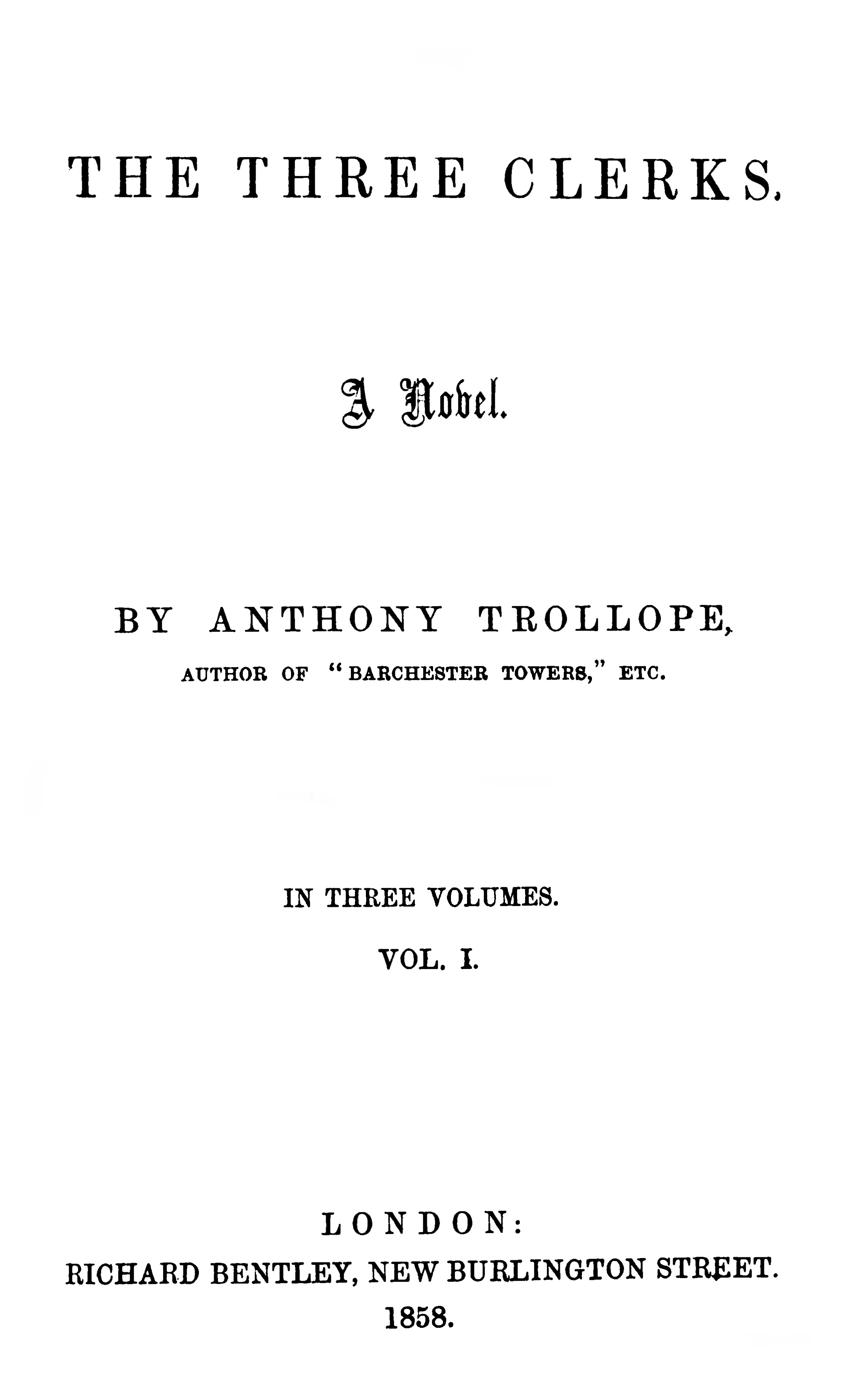
- First edition title page
- Author: Anthony Trollope
- Publisher: Richard Bentley
- Publication date: 1857
- Publication place: Great Britain

The Three Clerks (1857) is a novel by Anthony Trollope, set in the lower reaches of the Civil Service. It draws on Trollope's own experiences as a junior clerk in the General Post Office, and has been called the most autobiographical of Trollope's novels. In 1883 Trollope gave it as his opinion that The Three Clerks was a better novel than any of his earlier ones, which included The Warden and Barchester Towers.

== Synopsis ==
The story deals with the two friends Harry Norman and Alaric Tudor, who work at the Weights and Measures Office, and with Alaric's cousin Charley, who works in Internal Navigation. Harry falls in love with Gertrude Woodward, the eldest of the three beautiful daughters of a clergyman's widow, while Alaric pursues Linda, the second daughter. Gertrude rejects Harry's marriage proposal, and Alaric, rising in the ranks of the civil service, pursues and gains Gertrude's hand. Harry is unable to forgive Alaric, but eventually he marries the second daughter, Linda, and later becomes a country squire. Alaric meanwhile, becomes a Commissioner, but he falls under the influence of an unscrupulous member of Parliament, Undy Scott, who talks him into various schemes of dubious legality and morality, which eventually lead to his downfall. Charley Tudor is considered a rake, who spends his time at London's public houses and gin palaces. However, he dreams of a cleaner life, and loves Katie, the youngest sister, who falls in love with Charley after he rescues her from drowning in the Thames. Charley is also engaged to an Irish barmaid, and Katie's mother considers Charley an unsuitable husband, and forces him to swear never to speak to her.

== Composition ==
Trollope wrote The Three Clerks between 15 February 1857 and 18 August 1857, largely while commuting to and from work by train. It was published in three volumes by Richard Bentley in December 1857, though the title-page of the first edition bears the date 1858.

== Critical reception ==
Contemporary criticism of the book was mixed. Some reviewers were wrong-footed by its dissimilarity to the first Barsetshire novels, but The Times thought The Three Clerks "a really brilliant tale of official life", and The Leader said it was "a novel of uncommon and peculiar merit". The Saturday Review found much to admire, especially in the characters of the three daughters, who had "more freshness and life about them than is to be seen in the heroines of one novel out of a hundred"; but it found fault with the book for its errors in chronology and understanding of legal procedure, and for maladroitly introduced social criticism.

Christopher Harvie wrote that "The courtship and domestic comedy element is too trite", and called the whole novel "not very successful". Another modern critic complained that "Trollope slipped into an accusatory tone and heavy-handed characterization that qualified as caricature of the public-service men who controlled the fate of the clerks he depicted."
