= Hogglestock =

Hogglestock may refer to:

- A fictional town in Barsetshire, in the works of Anthony Trollope, especially The Last Chronicle of Barset
- A fictional hedgehog in Prince Caspian by C. S. Lewis
