= Chronicles of Barsetshire =

English novel series

- The Warden (1855); Barchester Towers (1857); Doctor Thorne (1858); Framley Parsonage (1861); The Small House at Allington (1864); The Last Chronicle of Barset (1867)
- Author: Anthony Trollope
- Country: England, United Kingdom
- Language: English
- Genre: Victorian, Literary fiction
- Publisher: Longmans; Chapman and Hall; Smith, Elder and Co.
- Published: 1 January 1855 – 6 July 1867 (initial publication)
- Media type: Print (Serial and Hardback); Audiobook; E-Book
- No. of books: 6

The Chronicles of Barsetshire is a series of six novels by English author Anthony Trollope, published between 1855 and 1867. They are set in the fictional English county of Barsetshire and its cathedral town of Barchester. The novels concern the dealings of the clergy and the gentry, and the political, amatory, and social manoeuvrings among them.

A series was not planned when Trollope began writing The Warden. Rather, after creating Barsetshire, he found himself returning to it as the setting for his following works. It was not until 1878, 11 years after The Last Chronicle of Barset, that these six novels were collectively published as the Chronicles of Barset.

This series is regarded by many as Trollope's finest work. Both modern and contemporary critics have praised the realism of Barsetshire and the intricacies of its characters. However, Trollope also received criticism, particularly for his plot development and the use of an intrusive narrative voice.

The series has been adapted for television in The Barchester Chronicles (1982) and Doctor Thorne (2016), and as dramatised radio programmes produced by BBC Radio 4.

== Plot summary ==
=== The Warden ===
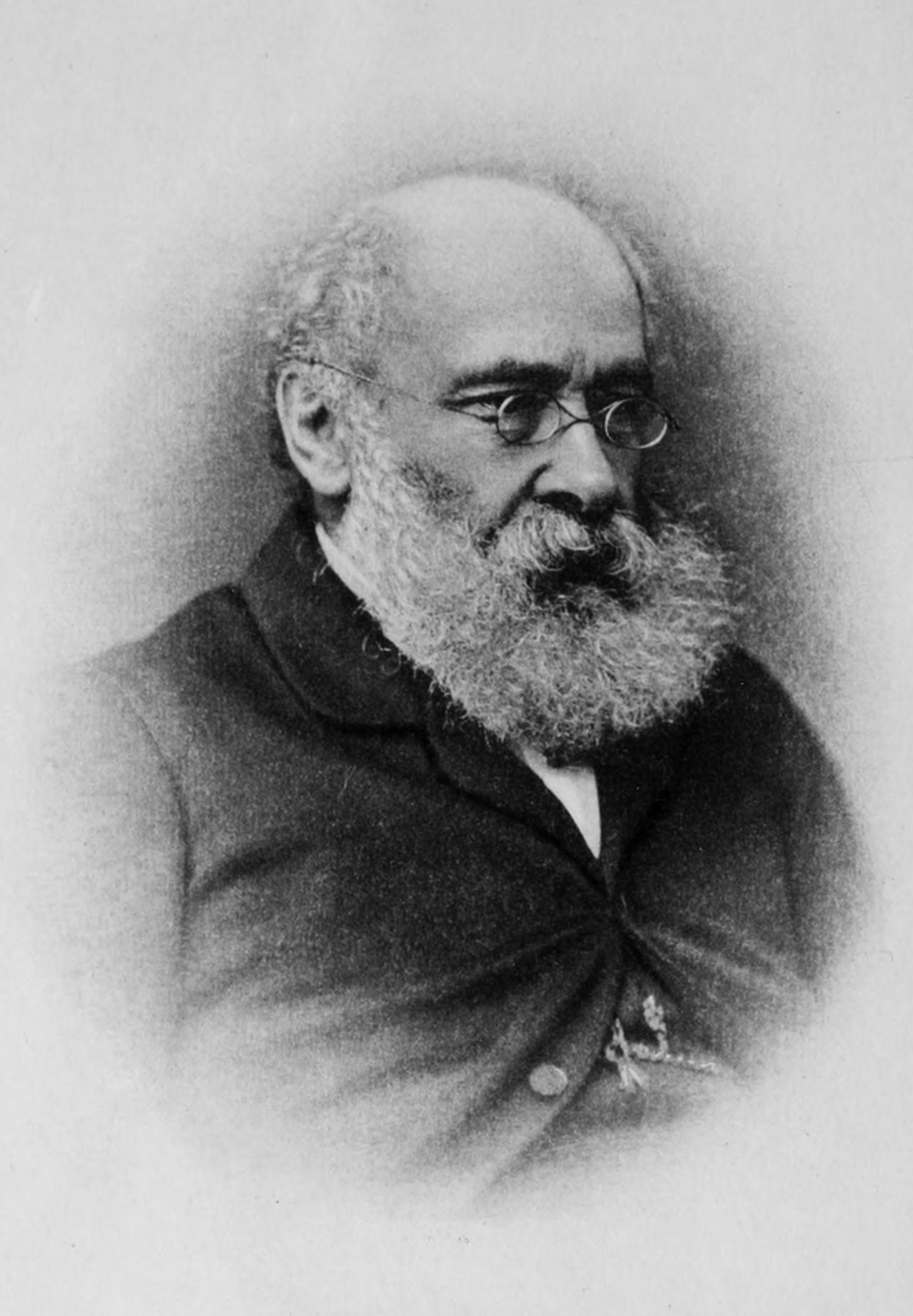
Portrait of the author, Anthony Trollope

Mr Harding, Warden of Hiram's Hospital, an almshouse in Barchester, is accused of enjoying an income from out of proportion to his responsibilities and the money given to the old people the Hospital houses. The accuser, a local doctor named John Bold, is actually in love with Mr Harding's daughter, Eleanor. Nevertheless, John takes the matter to the press, subjecting Mr Harding to public criticism. Mr Harding is supported by his son-in-law, Archdeacon Grantly, who insists that he maintain his innocence. Finally, following an ultimatum from Eleanor, John drops the case and apologises. Eleanor and John get married and Mr Harding resigns as Warden of Hiram's Hospital to become Rector of St. Cuthbert's Church on a much reduced income.

=== Barchester Towers ===
Following the death of Bishop Grantly, Dr Proudie is appointed as the new Bishop instead of Archdeacon Grantly (son of the Bishop), who had hoped for the post. Dr Proudie is supported by his imperious wife Mrs Proudie, and his chaplain, Mr Slope, both of whom want to steer the church away from traditional Anglican values. To fill the position of Warden at Hiram's Hospital, Mrs Proudie insists Mr Slope backs Mr Quiverful for the role. However, Mr Slope is infatuated with widowed Eleanor Bold, and instead secretly supports the reappointment of her father Mr Harding, as do the Archdeacon and Mr Arabin of Oxford University. Mr Slope eventually proposes to Eleanor, and in doing so, exposes his dealings with both sides. In the end, he is ostracised by the cathedral community, while Mr Arabin marries Eleanor and Mr Quiverful is appointed Warden of Hiram's Hospital.

=== Doctor Thorne ===
After the Gresham family has taken mortgages on the Greshamsbury estate to support itself, Frank Gresham, heir to the Greshamsbury estate, is being pressed by his family to marry a woman of wealth, such as Miss Dunstable. However, Frank is in love with Mary Thorne, niece of the Greshams' family physician, Doctor Thorne. While Mary appears to have no fortune, she is actually the illegitimate niece of the millionaire Sir Roger Scatcherd, a fact known only to Doctor Thorne. Following the death of Roger and his son Louis, Mary, being the eldest niece, receives Roger's inheritance. Despite having already consented to their marriage, Frank's family are far more welcoming of Mary after hearing she now has the wealth to restore the estate's fortune.

=== Framley Parsonage ===
In an attempt to make connections with high society, young vicar Mark Robarts foolishly guarantees a loan to a corrupt member of Parliament, Nate Sowerby. When Mr Sowerby does not repay the loan, Mark's friend Lord Lufton eventually steps in and saves Robarts from financial disaster. Mark's sister Lucy has moved to Framley and falls in love with Lord Lufton. However, Lucy rejects Lord Lufton's proposal, knowing that his mother, Lady Lufton, would refuse to accept a woman of her status as a potential wife for her son. Lady Lufton is adamant her son should marry Griselda Grantly, daughter of the Archdeacon. However, in the end, Lady Lufton changes her attitude and asks Lucy to accept her son's proposal, after witnessing Lucy care selflessly for the poor Mrs Crawley. Meanwhile, Mrs Proudie re-ignites a feud with the Archdeacon and his wife. Another subplot features the marriage of Doctor Thorne and the wealthy Miss Dunstable, who was initially the choice of Frank Gresham's family.

=== The Small House at Allington ===
Sisters Bell and Lily Dale live with their widowed mother in the "Small House" in the village of Allington. The squire, Christopher Dale, wants Bell to marry his nephew Bernard, who is heir to the estate. Bernard introduces Lily Dale to Adolphus Crosbie, who later proposes to her. However upon learning that Lily Dale is not due to receive any significant inheritance, Crosbie also proposes to Lady Alexandrina of the prominent de Courcy family, leaving Lily Dale heartbroken. Upon hearing this, Johnny Eames, lifelong admirer of Lily Dale, beats up Crosbie in an act of which promotes him to local hero. Yet despite his devotion, Lily Dale, still emotionally devastated, rejects his proposal and chooses instead to live with her mother. In the end, Bell marries a local doctor. Crosbie and Lady Alexandrina marry, but their life is unhappy, and they decide to separate.

=== The Last Chronicle of Barset ===
The main storyline follows the impoverished Rev. Josiah Crawley, introduced in Framley Parsonage, who is ostracised after being wrongly accused of stealing money. Meanwhile, Major Grantly, son of the Archdeacon, falls for the disgraced clergyman's daughter, Grace Crawley. The Archdeacon, initially objecting to the marriage, eventually consents after Mr Crawley's innocence is confirmed. John Eames continues his unsuccessful pursuit of Lily Dale, while the beloved former Warden, Mr Harding, dies of old age. Mrs Proudie also reappears, and demands that her husband, Bishop Proudie, ban Mr Crawley from holding services. However, being a proud man, Mr Crawley refuses to comply, before Mrs Proudie dies of a heart attack.

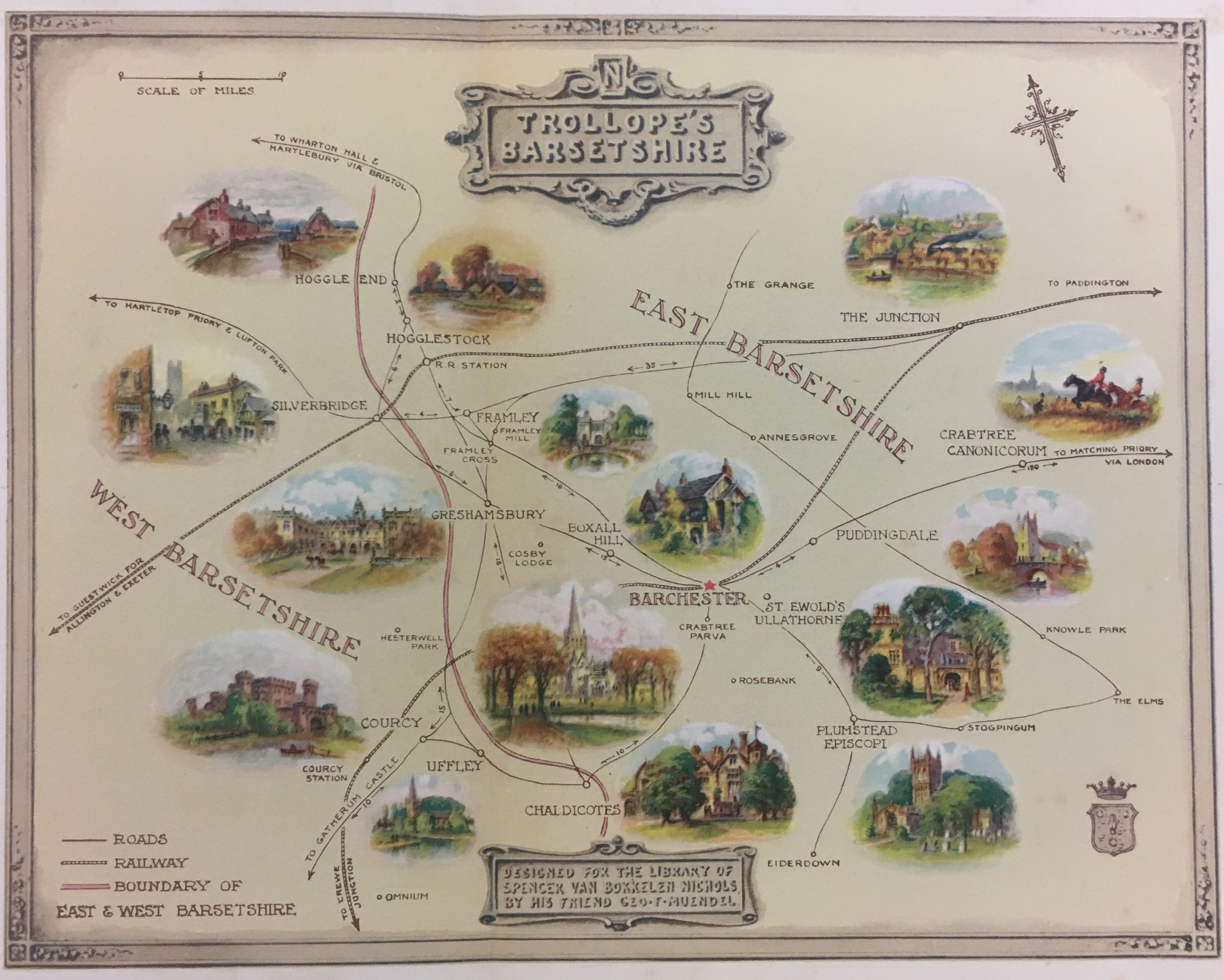
The county of Barsetshire

== Conception and publication ==
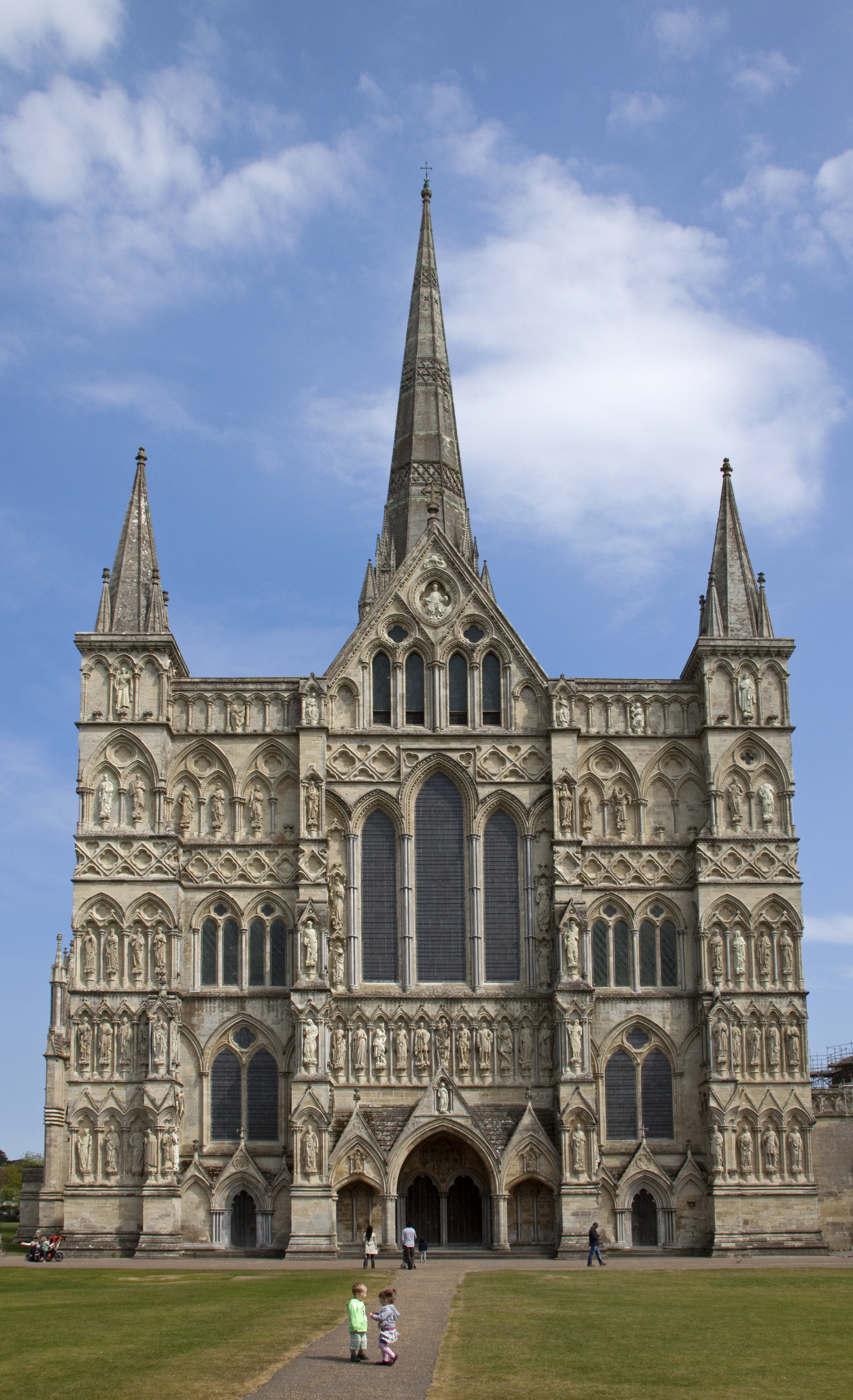
Salisbury Cathedral

While working at the General Post Office, Trollope travelled through the English countryside, witnessing the conventions of rural life and the politics surrounding the church and the manor house. On one particular trip to the cathedral city of Salisbury in 1852, Trollope developed his ideas for The Warden, which centred on the clergy. In doing so, the county of Barsetshire was born. Trollope did not begin writing The Warden until July 1853 – a year after his trip to Salisbury. Upon completion, he sent the manuscript to Longman for publishing, with the first copies released in 1855. While it was not a huge success, Trollope felt he had received more recognition than for any of his previous works.

While The Warden was intended as a one-off work, Trollope returned to Barsetshire for the setting of its sequel Barchester Towers. It was published in 1857, again by Longman, finding a similar level of success to its predecessor.

However, Trollope's greatest literary success, based on copies sold, came in the third Barsetshire instalment, Doctor Thorne. It was published by Chapman & Hall in 1858. Trollope credited his brother Tom for developing the storyline.

Following this, The Cornhill magazine approached Trollope to commission a novel to be released in serial parts. Trollope began what became Framley Parsonage. In his autobiography, he explained that by "placing Framley Parsonage near Barchester, I was able to fall back upon my old friends", hence forming the fourth Chronicle of Barsetshire. The novel was released by The Cornhill in 16 monthly instalments, from January 1860 to April 1861, and later published as a three-volume work by Smith, Elder & Co.

Now at the height of his popularity, Trollope wrote the fifth novel in the series, The Small House at Allington. It was also published in serial form, between September 1862 and April 1864 in The Cornhill, and then published as a 2-volume novel by Smith, Elder & Co. in 1864. Some have suggested that the character of Johnny Eames was inspired by Trollope's image of his younger self. Finally came the Last Chronicle of Barset, which Trollope claimed was "the best novel I have written". He took inspiration from his father when creating protagonist Josiah Crawley, while reflecting his mother, a successful author in later life, in the character of Mrs Crawley. It was released serially between 1866 and 1867 and published as a 2-volume work in 1867 by Smith, Elder & Co.

Anthony Trollope's signature

There is little to suggest that Anthony Trollope ever planned to write these six novels collectively as the Chronicles of Barsetshire. Rather, after developing the county of Barsetshire in The Warden, Trollope found himself frequently returning, often in response to the request of publishers. In doing so, prominent characters like Mrs Proudie and the Archdeacon could be reintroduced. It was not until he wrote Framley Parsonage that Trollope began to envision these works as a collective series. In his autobiography, he notes that after releasing The Last Chronicle of Barset, he wished for a "combined republication of those tales which are occupied within the fictitious county of Barsetshire". However, due to copyright issues, the six works were not formally republished as the Chronicles of Barset until 1878, 11 years after the Last Chronicle appeared. It was published by Chapman & Hall, who had published Doctor Thorne.

== Reception ==
=== As a series ===
The Chronicles of Barsetshire are widely regarded as Anthony Trollope's most famous literary works. In 1867, following the release of The Last Chronicle of Barset, a writer for The Examiner called these novels "the best set of sequels in our literature". Even today, these works remain his most popular. Modern critic Arthur Pollard writes: "Trollope is and will remain best known for his Barsetshire series", while P. D. Edwards offers a similar insight: "During his own lifetime, and for long afterwards, his reputation rested chiefly on the Barsetshire novels".

Despite a series not initially being intended, few have argued against the importance of appreciating each novel as part of the Chronicles of Barsetshire. As R. C. Terry writes, "the ironies embedded in the novel achieve their full effect only when one considers the entire Barsetshire series". Mary Poovey suggests that even before they were formally published as a series, reviewers understood their collective value. As The Examiner (1867) wrote, "the public should have these Barsetshire novels extant, not only as detached works, but duly bound, lettered, and bought as a connected series".

Discussion has also surrounded the extent to which Trollope's literary prowess is displayed throughout the Chronicles of Barsetshire. R.C. Terry argues that the series does "not reveal all of Trollope’s skills" while A. O. J. Cockshut believes it is "simple in conception" and "not fully characteristic of his genius". However, in his response to Cockshut, Miguel Ángel Pérez Pérez argues that "Trollope disguises many of his own opinions" throughout the series, and therefore they "are not so simple in conception, since they allow for different readings".

=== Praise ===
Trollope was praised for the characters he developed throughout the series. The London Review (1867) stated "we have thoroughly accepted the reality of their existence", while The Athenaeum (1867) wrote, "if the reader does not believe in Barsetshire and all who live therein […] the fault is not in Mr Trollope, but in himself". Most reviewers, like The Examiner (1867), agreed that reintroducing characters into the later instalment was Trollope "realiz[ing these characters] more and more completely". Mary Poovey similarly believes that such repetition meant the characters "seemed to live outside the pages of the novels". However, in contrast, the Saturday Review (1861) wrote that Trollope's practice of "borrowing from himself" was "at best a lazy and seductive artifice".

A writer for The Saturday Review (1864) compared Trollope's work to that of Jane Austen, arguing that in The Small House at Allington, Trollope does "what Miss Austen did, only that he does it in the modern style, with far more detail and far more analysis of character".

Trollope was also praised for the creation of Barsetshire, with critics like Arthur Pollard writing “He has created a recognisable world". Similarly, Nathaniel Hawthorne claimed it was "as if some giant had hewn a great lump out of the earth and put it under a glass case, with all its inhabitants going about their daily business". Contemporary reviewers like The Examiner (1858) also praised the realism of his fictitious world; "Trollope invites us, not to Barchester, but into Barsetshire". However, while inspired by real English counties, Barsetshire was, as P. D. Edwards writes, "explicitly his own creature". Andrew Wright saw this union of the real and imaginary as being "conjured up out of an imagination that is at once fantastic and domestic". Moreover, Arthur Pollard argues that setting these novels within "the clerical community" was "a brilliant choice" as it was "the central concern in the eyes of the nation".

The Chronicles of Barsetshire were also commended by other authors. Margaret Oliphant called the series "the most perfect art […] a kind of inspiration", while Virginia Woolf wrote: "We believe in Barchester as we believe in the reality of our own weekly bills".

=== Criticism ===
The series has been subject to criticism regarding its plot development. The Saturday Review (1861) wrote that "[T]he plot of Framley Parsonage is really extremely poor", going so far as to say "Mr Trollope is not naturally a good constructor of plots". Similarly, critic Walter Allen claimed that Trollope has "little skill in plot construction", while Stephen Wall suggested the outcome of The Small House at Allington "is visible early on".

Trollope was also criticised, particularly by contemporary reviewers, for his intrusive narrative voice throughout the series. In her essay, Mary Poovey draws on an example from The Warden, where Trollope offers his own insight into the character of Archdeacon Grantly – "our narrative has required that we should see more of his weakness than his strength". The Saturday Review (1861) refers to this as his "petty trick of passing a judgment on his own fictitious personages", while The Leader (1855) argued that because of such judgement "the 'illusion of the scene' is invariably perilled". Similarly, Henry James referred to Trollope as having a "suicidal satisfaction in reminding the reader that the story he was telling was only, after all, make-believe". However, Andrew Wright notes that at the time, it was not uncommon for authors to incorporate their own voice into their stories, and thus criticism such as that of James took issue not with the "intrusiveness, but arbitrariness" of Trollope's voice. As these novels started being appreciated as a series however, Mary Poovey notes a shift away from this point of criticism. She suggests this was both "a response to changes in Trollope's novelistic practice" and "a departure from an earlier critical consensus" regarding the use of a personal, narrative voice.

== Adaptations ==
=== TV series ===
In 1982, the BBC released The Barchester Chronicles – a television adaptation of The Warden and Barchester Towers directed by David Giles. The cast featured Nigel Hawthorne as the Archdeacon, Donald Pleasence as Mr Harding, Geraldine McEwan as Mrs Proudie and Alan Rickman as Mr Slope. The series consisted of 7 episodes, released originally on BBC 2 between 10 November and 22 December 1982. The first two episodes primarily covered The Warden while the remaining five covered Barchester Towers. In 1983, it received the BAFTA award for Best Design and was nominated for seven others, including Best Drama Series.

In 2016, Doctor Thorne was adapted for television as a 3-part mini-series. In the UK, it was released on ITV between 6–20 March 2016. It was directed by Niall MacCormick and written by Julian Fellowes.

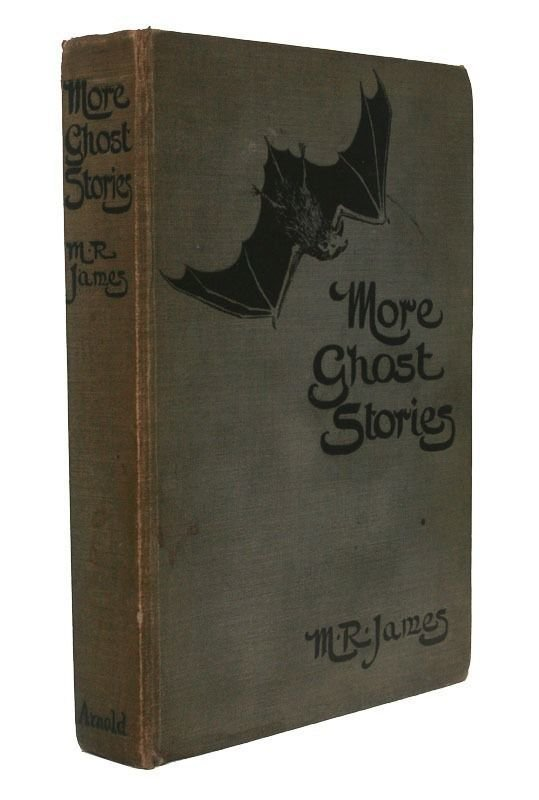
The Stalls of Barchester Cathedral

=== Radio ===
In 1993, The Small House at Allington was released as a dramatised radio programme on BBC Radio 4. It was created by Martin Wade and directed by Cherry Cookson. Each character was played by a voice actor, with the story being accompanied by music and sound effects. Following its success, the other five novels were also adapted to this form and released between December 1995 and March 1998 as The Chronicles of Barset.

BBC Radio 4 released another radio adaptation titled The Barchester Chronicles in 2014. This programme was created by Michael Symmons Roberts, and also covered all six Barsetshire novels.

=== Inspired works ===
Between 1933 and 1961, author Angela Thirkell published 29 novels set in the county of Barsetshire. While Thirkell introduced her own characters, she also incorporates members of Trollope's Barsetshire families, including the Crawleys, Luftons, Grantlys and Greshams. A writer for The New York Times (2008) suggested that "Unlike Trollope, Thirkell is uninterested in money and politics" but is instead, "interested in love".

Another early sequel was Barchester Pilgrimage, by the renowned priest, novelist and theologian Ronald Knox, following the children and grandchildren of Trollope's characters.

Author M. R. James also used Barchester for the setting of his 1910 short story The Stalls of Barchester Cathedral.
