= Doctor Thorne (TV series) =

- Genre: Period drama
- Written by: Julian Fellowes
- Directed by: Niall MacCormick
- Starring: Tom Hollander; Stefanie Martini; Harry Richardson; Rebecca Front; Richard McCabe; Ian McShane; Alison Brie; Janine Duvitski; Edward Franklin; Danny Kirrane; Nell Barlow; Gwyneth Keyworth; Phoebe Nicholls; Tim McMullan; Kate O'Flynn; Tom Bell; Nicholas Rowe; Ben Moor; Jane Guernier; Sean Cernow; David Sterne; Ed Cartwright; Michael Grady-Hall; Mark Carter; Cressida Bonas
- Composer: Ilan Eshkeri
- Country of origin: United Kingdom
- Original language: English
- No. of series: 1
- No. of episodes: 3 originally, 4 in North America

Production
- Executive producers: Julian Fellowes; Christopher Kelly; Mark Redhead; Harvey Weinstein; Negeen Yazdi
- Producers: Ted Childs; Helen Gregory
- Production locations: West Wycombe Park, Osterley Park, Knebworth House, Eastnor Castle, Tyntesfield House and Estate, Lacock and Castle Combe
- Cinematography: Jan Jonaeus
- Editors: Guy Bensley; Jamie Trevill
- Running time: 47–53 minutes^{(excluding advertisements)}
- Production company: Hat Trick Productions

Original release
- Network: ITV
- Release: 6 March – 20 March 2016

Doctor Thorne is a 2016 three-part (divided into four parts for broadcast in North America) television drama series adaptation of the 1858 Anthony Trollope novel Doctor Thorne scripted by Julian Fellowes for ITV. Mary Thorne, penniless and with undisclosed parentage, grows up under the guardianship of her uncle Doctor Thorne. She spends much of her formative years in the company of the Gresham family at Greshamsbury Park estate. As they close on the world of adult cares and responsibilities, the past starts to impinge and the financial woes of the Gresham family threaten to tear relationships apart.

== Cast ==
- Tom Hollander as Doctor Thorne
- Stefanie Martini as Mary Thorne
- Harry Richardson as Frank Gresham
- Rebecca Front as Lady Arabella Gresham
- Richard McCabe as Frank Gresham Snr.
- Ian McShane as Sir Roger Scatcherd
- Alison Brie as Miss Dunstable
- Janine Duvitski as Lady Scatcherd
- Edward Franklin as Louis Scatcherd
- Danny Kirrane as Mr. Moffatt
- Nell Barlow as Beatrice Gresham
- Gwyneth Keyworth as Augusta Gresham
- Phoebe Nicholls as Countess de Courcy
- Tim McMullan as Earl de Courcy
- Kate O'Flynn as Lady Alexandrina de Courcy
- Tom Bell as Lord Porlock
- Nicholas Rowe as Mortimer Gazebee
- Alex Price as Reverend Caleb Oriel
- Cressida Bonas as Patience Oriel
- Ben Moor as Cossett
- Jane Guernier as Janet Thacker
- Sean Cernow as Jonah
- David Sterne as Mr. Romer
- Ed Cartwright as Footman
- Michael Grady-Hall as Scatcherd's Footman
- Mark Carter as Moffatt's Heckler

== Episodes ==
No.	Title	Directed by	Written by	Original release date	Viewers (millions)	Length
1	"Episode One"	Niall MacCormick	Julian Fellowes, Anthony Trollope (novel)	6 March 2016	5.60	48 minutes
In the fictional Barsetshire of Anthony Trollope during the 1850s, the genial Doctor Thorne is left raise his niece, Mary. This follows a significant incident during the opening scene between Roger Scatcherd and a Mr Thorne which involves accusations and Mr Thorne's violent death. Now, decades later, Frank Gresham is in love with Mary but his family needs money—and for Frank to "marry well".
2	"Episode Two"	Niall MacCormick	Julian Fellowes, Anthony Trollope (novel)	13 March 2016	4.39	48 minutes
Sir Roger Scatcherd trumps the opposition at the election hustings, but collapses from the ravages on his health due to excessive drink. He is cared for by Doctor Thorne and Mary. More comes to light about her background and Sir Roger grasps the truth. Louis Scatcherd, Roger’s son, is sent for although he clearly cares little for his father, only his money. Doctor Thorne learns that Louis has romantic aspirations regarding his niece and is revolted by the idea. The American heiress, Miss Dunstable, encourages Frank to continue his romance with Mary; this is in opposition to his family who need money from a match in order to retain their ancestral seat.
3	"Episode Three"	Niall MacCormick	Julian Fellowes, Anthony Trollope (novel)	20 March 2016	4.14	48 minutes
Frank's mother, Lady Arabella, along with her sister-in-law, persuades Mary to release Frank from their engagement. The reason she gives is that to hold on to Frank would be selfish and against Frank's best interests.
4	"Episode Four"	Niall MacCormick	Julian Fellowes, Anthony Trollope (novel)	20 March 2016	4.14	43 minutes
Louis Scatcherd follows his father's self destructive drinking habit and disgraces himself while at dinner with Doctor Thorne and the Greshams. Following the pressure exerted upon Mary by Frank's mother, Lady Arabella, along with her sister-in-law, Mary breaks her engagement to Frank. Louis Scatcherd’s drunken rage does not bode well for him. Frank's mother, Lady Arabella, repents. A happy ending at last.

== Release ==
The series was picked up in the US by the Weinstein Company which owns the licence for North America. The series was made available on Amazon Prime on 20 May 2016. The series was aired in three episodes in the UK. For its presentation on Amazon Prime, the series’ original three parts were recut into four episodes, each with an introduction and an epilogue featuring Fellowes himself.

=== Home media ===
The series was released on DVD Region 2 in the original three-episode version.

== Reception ==
On review aggregator Rotten Tomatoes, the series has an aggregated score of 87% based one 15 critic reviews, with an average rating of 6.6/10. The website's critics consensus reads: "Doctor Thorne provides a good prescription for those going through Downton Abbey withdrawals."

The Telegraph initially registered a largely positive opening assessment, although it also had some criticisms. By the end of the series its review was more mixed, and it wanted more episodes.
