= Janet Maw =

English actress (born 1954)

Janet Maw (born 16 May 1954) is an English actress.

She was a member of the BBC's Radio Drama Company.

== Career ==
=== Television ===
- The Mayor of Casterbridge, 1978, BBC TV mini-series 7 episodes
- Richard II, (TV film, 1978)
- The Barchester Chronicles, 1982, BBC TV mini-series 7 episodes
- Frost In May, 1982, BBC TV mini-series
- Sparrow
- The Cater Street Hangman (TV film, 1998)
