= Barchester Pilgrimage =

1935 novel by Ronald Knox

- First edition
- Author: Ronald Knox
- Language: English
- Genre: Fiction
- Publisher: Sheed and Ward
- Publication date: 1935
- Publication place: England
- Media type: Hardcover
- Pages: 278

Barchester Pilgrimage is a 1935 novel by Ronald Knox, published in London by Sheed and Ward, in which Knox picks up the narrative of the original Chronicles of Barsetshire where Anthony Trollope breaks off. Knox follows the fortunes of the children and grandchildren of Trollope's characters up to the time of writing (1934), with some gentle satire on the social, political and religious changes of the 20th century. The novel was reprinted in 1990 by the Trollope Society.

== Plot summary ==
Knox narrates the plot through the eyes of Mr. Bunce. The novel begins with an introduction to some characters including Johnny Bold, Dean Arabin, Eleanor Arabin, Archdeacon Grantley and many more. Johnny Bold is placed as the protagonist, who becomes an atheist in a town where atheism is rare. This atheism is then reflected in Bold's progression into becoming a doctor, shadowing a certain Dr. Fillgrave. Meanwhile, Augusta Oriel, a conscientious and religious woman is introduced who seemingly falls ill and is then treated by Johnny Bold. Johnny then falls in love with Augusta, but is rejected by her upon confession of his love due to differing religious beliefs. He is then followed to France by Knox, where he meets Signora Vesey Neroni. Signora and Johnny are introduced to each other, and Johnny is later compelled to confess his love for her. Before Signora can respond, Johnny is called to serve an injured individual.

Knox begins the second chapter with an introduction to two brothers, Marmaduke and Francis Thorne. Marmaduke grows eager to take upon a clerical role in one of his family owned properties, "Chaldicotes". He discusses the prospects for this with Bishop Grantley who suggests him to take on such roles in smaller, country regions first in order to gain experience. Marmaduke then meets Miss Van Skulpit, who is later invited to a gathering by Francis at Chaldicotes. Meanwhile, Marmaduke's efforts are rejected by Bishop Grantley, sparking him to see Father Shoehorn. Marmaduke tells Father Shoehorn about his rejection from Grantley in such a way that it seems that it was Marmaduke who rejected Bishop Grantley's offer, causing Father Shoehorn to offer Marmaduke theological education for his pursuits. However, Marmaduke eventually weds Miss Van Skulpit and leaves for America, with no mention of his previous clerical ambitions again.

The plot then shifts to the Gresham family at the start of the third chapter, most importantly, Major Gresham. Major Gresham is an elected member of the parliament. He seems to grow fond of Miss Lookaloft, to which objection is raised by Countess de Courcy, an advisor of the Greshams. This is because Miss Lookaloft founded a Conservative party in Barsetshire, whereas the Countess is part of the Liberal party. This objection yields nothing, as Major Gresham eventually gets engaged to Miss Lookaloft in private. Meanwhile, Major Gresham hosts a gathering of politicians for political reform where he is informed of his opposition resigning from their political duties, leaving Major Gresham as the new leader of the nation. However, following a motor accident in which Miss Lookaloft suffers from concussion, Major Gresham loses his seat in Parliament through election. He is then informed of Miss Lookaloft leaving the hospital upon recovery for travels of the sea as her medicine, realising that she only courted him for his political power. This is then confirmed by Major Gresham receiving an invitation to the wedding of Miss Lookaloft to her personal escort at sea, Lord Porlock.

The fourth chapter leads with the ancestry of a new character, Theophylact Crawley-Grantley. Theophylact is the grandson of Archdeacon Grantley and Mr. Crawley. He takes upon a role in the clergy of Barchester, however, delivers his first sermon in the Cathedral in an unorthodox manner. This sermon is twisted and turned by the media and the gossip of the people, creating controversy around Theophylact, which he takes as a positive sign of newfound religious engagement within the people of Barchester. Theophylact eventually marries Mrs. Friedenzeit, who regardless of the controversy, applauds Theophylact for his courage in expressing himself and potentially bringing about change. He then proceeds to garner greater public notability by proposing the abolishment of the Tithe, and becomes the leading choice for the next Bishop of Silverbridge. This is stalled by the onset of the War on Barchester, and the consequences of the War eventually lead to Theophylact being forced out of his position.

The pilgrimage to Barchester takes place in chapter five. Reverend Charles Awmbry and Dean Allcombe are introduced. Mr. Awmbry reminds Dean Allcombe that the present year, 1925, is the one-thousandth death anniversary of St. Ewold, the actual date in near sight. The church of St. Ewold lied close to the middle of Barchester, causing Mr. Awmbry to suggest a large, religious procession in Barchester to honour this specific event. The procession took place, gathering crowds from all over the nation, and was deemed a success by the people. The people of Barchester itself, however, were indifferent to the processions as it was no more than a regular Catholic procession to them. The pilgrimage aided the economics of Barchester, but became increasingly unpopular and no more a point of interest for the people of Barsetshire as the time went on. Simultaneously, Lord Dumbello and Miss Lufton are introduced. They are entangled romantically with one another, and eventually get engaged to each other. Upon informing his mother of the engagement, Lord Dumbello realises that due to his lack of devotion to any religious cause since a young age, there could potentially be an issue in marrying Miss Lufton. Miss Lufton had no issue with this, being a devoted Catholic herself. However, their families, the clergymen of Barchester, and some other people objected to this. This created issues in the lead up to the marriage, eventually causing the engagement to be broken off.

In the final chapter, Knox introduces Mr. Septimus Arabin who initially denies a role in the clergy only to return as the Warden of Hiram's Hospital. He oversees the conduction of yet another centenary celebration, albeit in a limited manner, this time the five-hundredth death anniversary of John Hiram. The celebrations would occur at Hiram's Hospital, prior to which Mr. Arabin became a married man out of the blue. This happened to discontent the people of Barchester, as the culture of the town despised "the suddenness of it all, and perhaps too, the secrecy". Simultaneously, Mr. Arabin was subject to great praise in the 'Jupiter' newspaper for being a well-suited Warden at the hospital.

Later, a discovery is made by Dean Allcombe that Mr. Arabin's wife is a woman who has separated from her spouse due to mistreatment. This is looked down upon by the Dean, however, Mr. Easyman argues that as long as Mr. Arabin's teachings at the Hospital comply with the Church, it is up to the committee of the Hospital themselves to decide whether or not Mr. Arabin's personal life has much of an impact on his career. However, Mr. Septimus Arabin resigns himself prior to any of the gossip being spread, as he sees no future in his teachings and feels that his position is not fitted for the way the times and people are changing. Mr. Easyman tries to argue him into reversing on his decision, but this is of no yield in the end.

== Background ==
Ronald Knox (1888–1957) was an English priest, writer and the author of Barchester Pilgrimage. He was birthed in Kibworth, Leicestershire and attained his education at Eton and Oxford. He was born into a clerical family, and later became a Catholic converted from an Anglican. Knox was known for his translation of the Bible which he completed in 1949. Knox' works spanned over multiple genres, including "parodies, apologetics, criticism, light verse, and memoirs", along with being a "scholar and author of detective fiction". Through Barchester Pilgrimage, he authored the sequel to Trollope's world of Barsetshire. Knox also created a map of the world of Barsetshire in his novel, which was based on his interpretation of Trollope's description of the setting in his original novels. This map of Barsetshire was part of Knox' novel.

According to scholarly interpretations, Knox was "obsessed with Trollope's ecclesiastical novel cycle, The Chronicles of Barsetshire". Along with this, Knox explored the world of 'Trollopeana' throughout his literary career, and eventually adapted the works of Trollope into his own writings, leading to the publishing of Barchester Pilgrimage. The novel served as a sequel to Trollope's Barsetshire. He continued the story that Trollope left in 1867 by picking up the narrative with one of Trollope's characters, Johnny Bold. He placed the beginning of this sequel-novel in 1877, a year following the point at which Trollope left the story. He slowly merges the narrative into his own by depicting the passage of multiple generations, leading to a 1934 setting, in the heart of Knox' Barchester Pilgrimage.

== Analysis and criticisms ==
The style of the novel has been extrapolated to be a result of Knox' admiration of Trollope's Barsetshire. Knox used a "respectfully imitative prose style" to that of Trollope's in his original writings, interpreted to be allowing him to continue the story in an authentic manner. It has further been discussed that such allusive writing allowed Knox to write Barchester Pilgrimage in a manner that was "recognisably Trollopean". This is exaggerated by Knox consistently referring to Trollope as "my author" in Barchester Pilgrimage.

The novel itself was around 300 pages long, contrary to Trollope's lengthy novels such as The Warden, which spanned around 500 to 800 pages. This distinction has been suggested to be because Knox' work was not to create the setting. Knox was hence able to maintain the "leisurely" nature of Trollope's Barsetshire, due to a lack of excessive and detailed descriptions of the settings and the characters.

Furthermore, some interpretations suggest that Knox did add a personal aspect to the novel, as it is not entirely written in a Trollopean manner. Trollope made use of "epistolary chapters" in order to explicitly display character, which was a trait that Knox did not employ in Barchester Pilgrimage. On the contrary, a style aspect of Trollope's that Knox "embraced with glee" was the employment of "stylised names" to name his characters, which is demonstrated through characters such as "Drs. Killgerm and Motherwell". Another key aspect of the novel was the use of satire, which Knox had previously demonstrated in his texts such as 'Enthusiasm' and 'Absolute and Abitofhell'. Knox is said to have maintained this satirical nature in the Barsetshire-based series. He follows Trollope's lead yet again in executing a Horatian style of satire, rather than the general Swiftian style.

The novel was subject to criticism as well. It has been critically discussed that Knox was unable to "grasp Trollope's general attitude – dual and paradoxical". Another criticism that the novel received was that Knox, especially in the first chapter, fails to depict the inevitability of Johnny Bold being rejected. This is argued to subdue the original style of Trollope, as the dilemma which Miss Augusta Oriel faced would have been a "first-class catastrophe" in the eyes of Trollope. In addition, the same critics argue that the character of Arthur Gresham is perfectly designed to mirror the style of Trollope. Another personal element that Knox consistently reiterates is the manner in which the Roman Catholics win almost every encounter in the novel, something that is argued to be inauthentic to even a fair man like Trollope.

== Publication details ==
The first publication of the novel was in 1935, a 278-page hardcover copy. The availability of Knox' works has become scarce as time has passed, and can "only be purchased at a shop that specialises in rosaries and missals". Furthermore, one must search for the original Sheed and Ward publications in order to acquire one of Knox's works as they were initially published.

== Legacy ==
Barchester Pilgrimage itself was significant in Knox' career, as it allowed for his transition into the field of writing sequel-novels. Along with the other texts, Knox established this particular venture of his literary career. Barchester Pilgrimage further enhanced Trollope's originals works, as Knox broke down the Trollopean views of England, something that had become a literary trait of Knox' due to his translation of the Bible previously. The text also gave literary scholars an opportunity to study Knox' fictional works in conjunction with his personal context.
