= Doctor Thorne =

1858 novel by Anthony Trollope

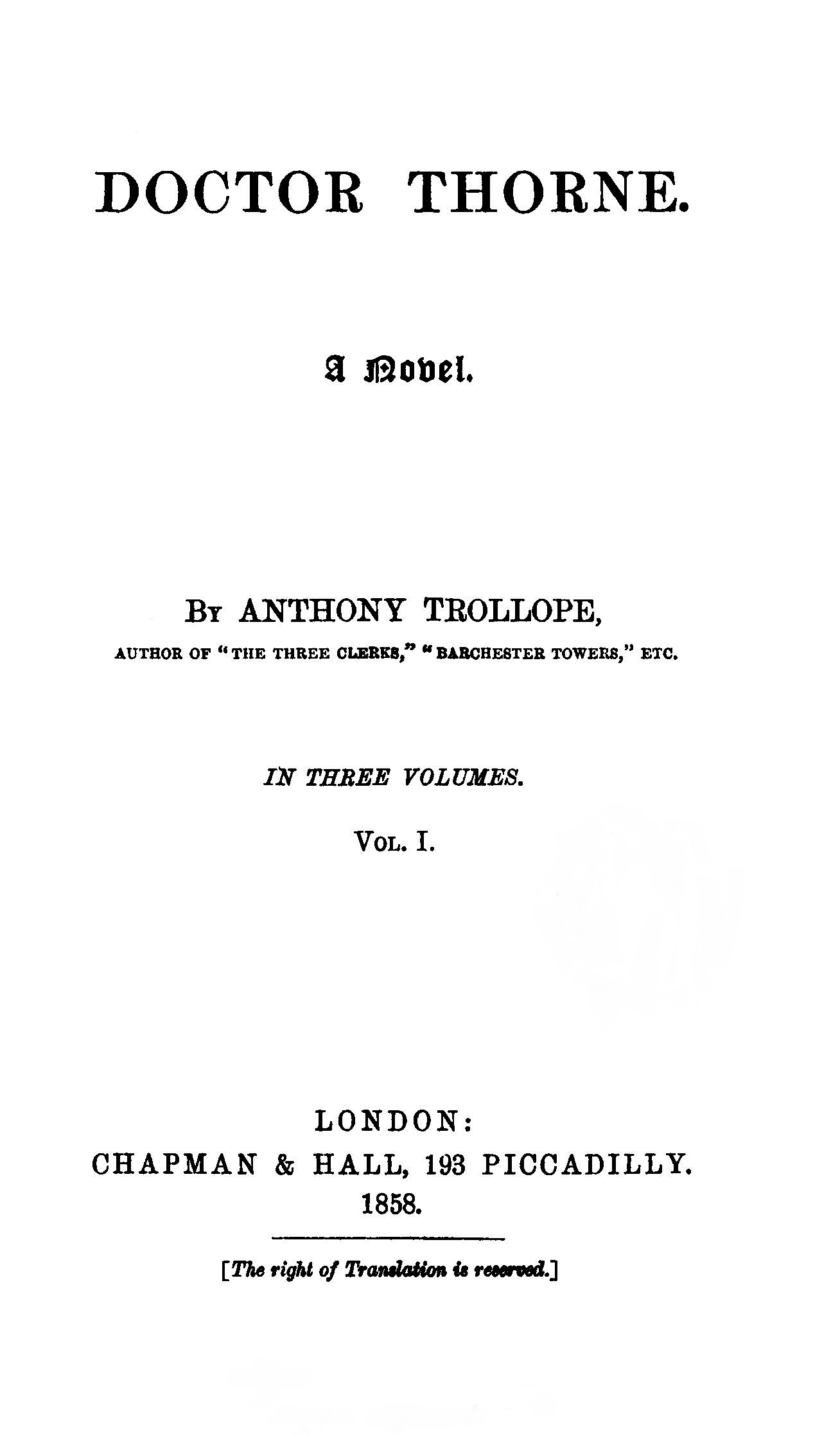
- First edition title page.
- Author: Anthony Trollope
- Language: English
- Series: Chronicles of Barsetshire
- Publisher: Chapman and Hall
- Publication date: 1858
- Media type: Print
- Preceded by: Barchester Towers
- Followed by: Framley Parsonage
- Text: Doctor Thorne at Wikisource

Doctor Thorne is a novel by the English author Anthony Trollope, published in 1858. It is the third book in his Chronicles of Barsetshire series, between Barchester Towers and Framley Parsonage. The idea of the plot was suggested to Trollope by his brother Thomas. Michael Sadleir places it as one of the five best of Trollope's novels and the best of the Barsetshire novels.

The novel is set in Greshamsbury, a village fifteen miles from the town of Barchester. Most of the narrative revolves round the three families of Gresham, Thorne and Scatcherd. The Greshams are commoners, but an old and respected family, based at Greshamsbury Hall and headed by Francis Newbold Gresham. His wife, Lady Arabella, is sister of the Earl de Courcy. Doctor Thorne lives in the village with his niece Mary. He and Gresham have become friends and he has helped Gresham by negotiating loans, mostly from Sir Roger Scatcherd, originally a stonemason in Barchester who has become wealthy and has purchased a large property between Greshamsbury and Barchester.

== Plot summary ==
When their father dies, Doctor Thomas Thorne and his younger brother Henry are left little from the estate. Thomas begins to establish a medical practice, while Henry seduces Mary Scatcherd, the sister of stonemason Roger Scatcherd. When Roger finds out that Mary has become pregnant, he gives Henry a thrashing, inadvertently killing him. Roger is found guilty of manslaughter and sentenced to six months in prison.

While her brother is incarcerated, Mary gives birth to a girl. A former suitor offers to marry Mary and emigrate to America to start a new life, but not if she keeps the baby. Doctor Thorne persuades Mary to accept the offer, promising to raise his niece. Mary tells Roger that the baby has died. Thorne names the child Mary Thorne, keeps her parentage secret, and arranges for her to be looked after on a nearby farm and later to attend a boarding school.

When Thorne becomes the family doctor to the Greshams, the preeminent family of the county, he also becomes advisor to the head of the family, squire Frank Gresham. About this time an heir is born at Greshamsbury Hall to much celebration. The aristocratic mother, Lady Arabella, engages a wet nurse for her son, also named Frank. However, the girl proves to be too fond of brandy. Thorne knows that Mrs Scatcherd had been left in dire financial distress by her husband's imprisonment, so he arranges for her to take over the role.

Time passes, and 12-year-old Mary Thorne came to Greshamsbury from her school in Bath. Soon she endears herself to the Greshams. Dr Thorne feels he has to inform Frank Gresham, in strictest confidence, of Mary's background to allow him to decide if he would object to her associating with his family. Lady Arabella some qualms but the squire overrules her.

Mary's maternal uncle, Roger Scatcherd, rises from humble beginnings to great wealth and a knighthood through his prodigious skills, not only as a mason but also as a contractor. Doctor Thorne, who visited Scatcherd in prison and befriended him, becomes his financial advisor. Thorne persuades Scatcherd to lend increasing sums to Frank Gresham, who had impoverished himself by running for Parliament three times. Eventually, much of the Gresham estate is put up as collateral for these loans.

As young adults, Mary and the younger Frank Gresham fall in love. However, his parents need him to marry wealth. As Mary is penniless and of suspect birth, such a marriage is inconceivable to his mother and to her relatives, the aristocratic de Courcys. They wish Frank to marry the eccentric 30-year-old heiress Martha Dunstable instead. Frank reluctantly visits Courcy Castle in order to meet Miss Dunstable, and they become friends. He foolishly and playfully proposes, but she wisely demurs, knowing that he does not love her.

Sir Roger Scatcherd is a chronic drunkard, and Doctor Thorne tries in vain to get him to curtail his drinking. In his will, Scatcherd leaves the bulk of his estate to his only son, the dissolute Louis Philippe. However, he leaves Doctor Thorne in control of the inheritance until Louis Philippe reaches the age of 25. Should Louis die before then, Scatcherd stipulates that the estate go to his sister Mary's eldest child. Thorne, knowing that Scatcherd is thinking of the children Mary had in America, is forced to divulge Mary's parentage, but Scatcherd leaves the will unchanged.

Roger Scatcherd eventually dies of drink. The son proves just as much an alcoholic as the father, and his weaker constitution quickly brings him to the same end. After consulting with lawyers, Doctor Thorne confirms that his niece Mary is the heiress, now wealthier than even Miss Dunstable.

Unaware of these developments, the still resolute Frank finally persuades his doting father to consent to his marriage to Mary. When all is revealed, all of his relations heartily congratulate him.

== Characters ==
=== The Thornes ===
- Dr Thomas Thorne, the uncle of Mary Thorne, who works as a doctor and apothecary. He is the confidant of both Squire Gresham and Sir Roger.
- Mary Thorne, the niece of Dr. Thorne and Sir Roger

=== The Scatcherds ===
- Sir Roger Scatcherd, a poor stonemason with a talent for business, who later becomes a very wealthy building contractor
- Lady Scatcherd, wife of Sir Roger, mother of Louis Philippe, and Frank Gresham's wet nurse
- Sir Louis Philippe Scatcherd, the only son of Sir Roger Scatcherd

=== The Greshams ===
- Mr Francis Newbold Gresham, senior, the squire of Greshamsbury
- Lady Arabella, his wife, née de Courcy, who is most anxious for Frank to "marry money"
- Francis "Frank" Newbold Gresham, junior, the squire's eldest child, only son and heir
- Augusta Gresham, the eldest of Frank's sisters, who is jilted by Mr. Moffat and who then turns down a propsal from Mr Gazebee
- Beatrice Gresham, Frank's next sister, and best friend and confidante of Mary

=== The de Courcys ===
- The Earl de Courcy, Lady Arabella Gresham's brother
- Lady de Courcy, wife of the Earl, who schemes to set Frank Gresham up with the wealthy Martha Dunstable
- Lord Porlock, eldest son and heir to the Earl de Courcy
- The Honourable George de Courcy and the Honourable John de Courcy, younger sons of the de Courcys, who entertain faint hopes of making an advantageous marriage to Miss Dunstable
- Lady Amelia de Courcy, the eldest daughter, who dissuades Augusta from marrying the attorney Gazebee, going on to marry him herself
- Ladies Rosina, Margaretta, and Alexandrina, their daughters, all as yet unmarried

=== The Oriels ===
- Caleb Oriel, a clergyman who later marries Beatrice Gresham
- Patience Oriel, Caleb's sister, and a close friend of Beatrice

=== Others ===
- The Duke of Omnium, an extremely wealthy and debauched bachelor who figures in a number of Trollope's Barsetshire and Palliser novels
- Martha Dunstable, a kind-hearted, wealthy heiress of the "oil of Lebanon" business
- Mr. Moffat, one-time suitor of Miss Augusta Gresham, who later withdraws his proposal in order to seek a more advantageous match, and is horsewhipped by Frank for it
- Mr. Gazebee, an attorney, who proposes first to Augusta Gresham and then to Lady Amelia de Courcy
- Dr. Fillgrave, a Barchester doctor who detests Dr Thorne

== Adaptations ==
An ITV adaptation, Doctor Thorne, starring Stefanie Martini as Mary Thorne and Harry Richardson as Frank Gresham aired on 6 March 2016. The script was written by Julian Fellowes, the creator and scriptwriter for Gosford Park and Downton Abbey.

== See also ==
- Illegitimacy in fiction
