= The Mayor of Casterbridge (TV series) =

1978 British TV drama series

- DVD cover
- Genre: Classic serial
- Based on: The Mayor of Casterbridge by Thomas Hardy
- Screenplay by: Dennis Potter
- Directed by: David Giles
- Starring: Alan Bates
- Composer: Carl Davis
- Country of origin: United Kingdom
- Original language: English
- No. of episodes: 7

Production
- Producer: Jonathan Powell
- Running time: 50 min. (per episode) & 55 min. (final ep.)

Original release
- Network: BBC2
- Release: 22 January – 5 March 1978

The Mayor of Casterbridge is a 1978 BBC seven-part serial based on the eponymous 1886 book by the British novelist Thomas Hardy. The six-hour drama was written by television dramatist Dennis Potter and directed by David Giles with Alan Bates as the title character. It was released as a 3-disc DVD box set in May 2003.

== Plot ==
On a drunken impulse, Henchard sells his wife and daughter at a country fair, an outrageous act for which he suffers agonising remorse. Years later, when he has become a respected and prosperous man, his wife returns to find him. Henchard's attempt to right the long-ago wrong sets in motion a series of events that spell his destruction.

== Cast ==
- Alan Bates as Michael Henchard
- Anne Stallybrass as Susan
- Janet Maw as Elizabeth-Jane
- Jack Galloway as Farfrae
- Anna Massey as Lucetta

== Location ==
The series was shot entirely on location in Dorset, largely in the village of Corfe Castle.
