= The Barchester Chronicles =

- DVD cover
- Genre: Drama
- Based on: The Warden and Barchester Towers by Anthony Trollope
- Written by: Alan Plater
- Directed by: David Giles
- Starring: Donald Pleasence; Nigel Hawthorne; David Gwillim; John Ringham; Joseph O'Conor; Alan Rickman; Clifford Parrish; Angela Pleasence; Geraldine McEwan; Janet Maw; Susan Hampshire; Barbara Flynn
- Composer: Derek Bourgeois
- Country of origin: United Kingdom
- Original language: English
- No. of series: 1
- No. of episodes: 7

Production
- Producer: Jonathan Powell
- Running time: 55 minutes

Original release
- Network: BBC2
- Release: 10 November – 22 December 1982

The Barchester Chronicles is a 1982 British seven-part television serial produced by Jonathan Powell for the BBC. It is an adaptation by Alan Plater of Anthony Trollope's first two Chronicles of Barsetshire, The Warden (1855) and Barchester Towers (1857). The series was directed by David Giles. Location work was videotaped in and around Peterborough Cathedral, using locations such as the Deanery and Laurel Court.

== Plot overview ==
The clerical community around Barchester's cathedral is rocked by a press investigation into the finances of Hiram's Hospital almshouse. Following the death of the bishop in the midst of the controversy, the chaplain and wife of the new bishop lead a reforming crusade, which arouses strong opposition within the diocese. These public events have a significant effect on the private lives of many of those involved.

== Cast ==
- Donald Pleasence as Mr Harding
- Nigel Hawthorne as Archdeacon Grantly
- Angela Pleasence as Mrs Grantly
- Cyril Luckham as Bishop Grantly
- David Gwillim as John Bold
- George Costigan as Tom Towers
- John Ringham as Finney
- Barbara Flynn as Mary Bold
- Janet Maw as Eleanor Harding
- Clive Swift as Bishop Proudie
- Geraldine McEwan as Mrs Proudie
- Alan Rickman as Obadiah Slope
- Susan Hampshire as Signora Madeline Neroni
- Ursula Howells as Miss Thorne
- Peter Blythe as Bertie Stanhope
- Susan Edmonstone as Charlotte Stanhope
- Joseph O'Conor as Bunce
- Jonathan Adams as Mr Quiverful
- Maggie Jones as Mrs Quiverful
- Clifford Parrish as Handy
- Derek New as Mr Arabin
- Richard Bebb as Dr Stanhope
- William Redgrave as Samuel Grantly
- Trevor Baxter as Dr Gwynne
- Wally Thomas as Moody
- Kenneth Keeling as Gazy
- Denis Carey as Skulpit
- Richard Leech as Wilfred Thorne
- George Malpas as the ticket collector
- Mischa De La Motte as The Dean
- Raymond Platt as Haphazard's clerk
- Alec Bregonzi as a Footman
- Paddy Ward as Hotel Waiter
- Roger Booth as Plomacy
- Joe Ritchie as Coffee House Waiter
- Michael Aldridge as Sir Abraham Haphazard
- Phyllida Law as Mrs Stanhope
- Ian Brimble as Harry Greenacre
- Keith Marsh as Bell
- Jim Baker as Quiverful son
- Harold Gasnier as Form Tutor

== Filming locations ==
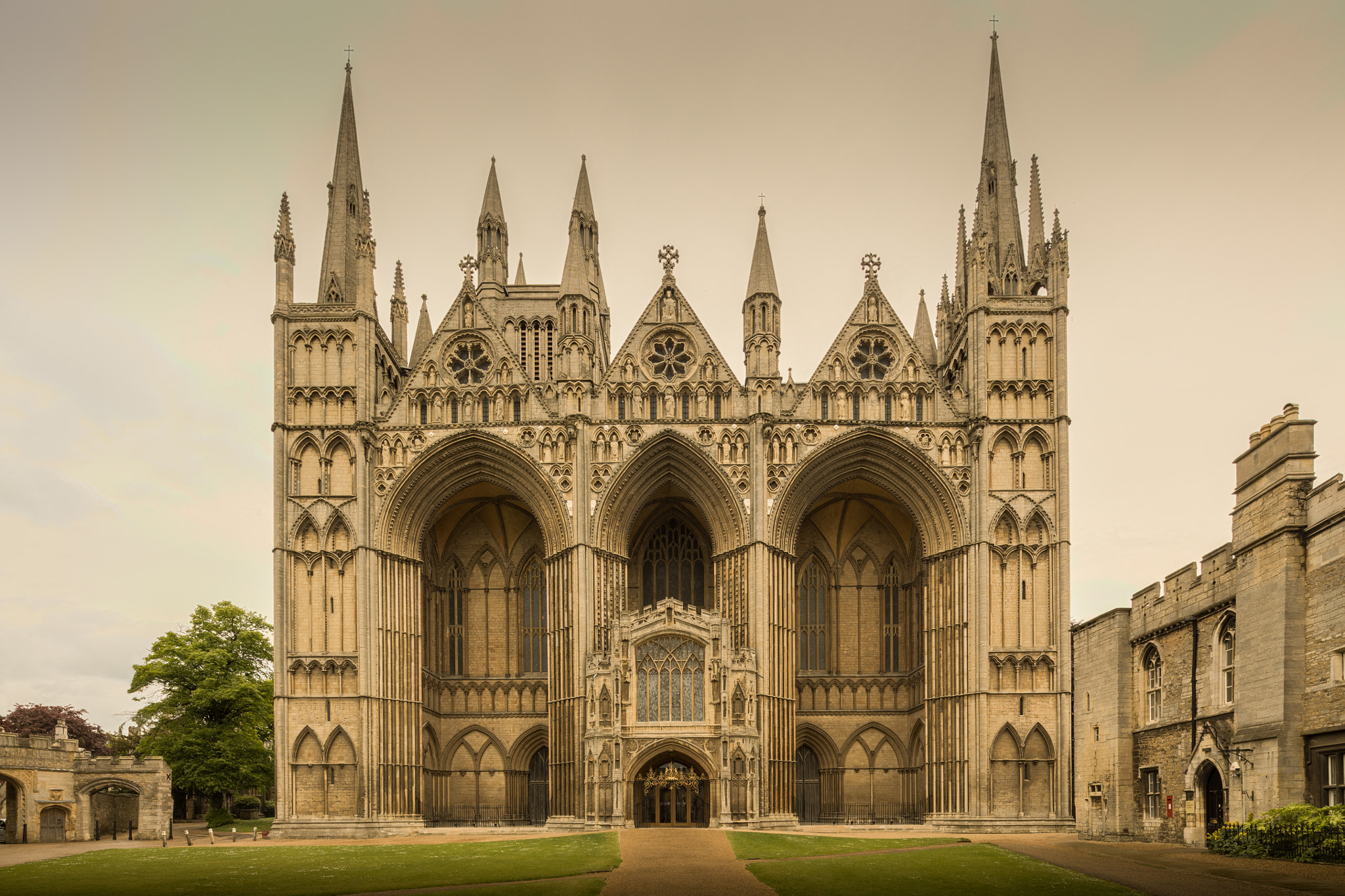
Peterborough Cathedral

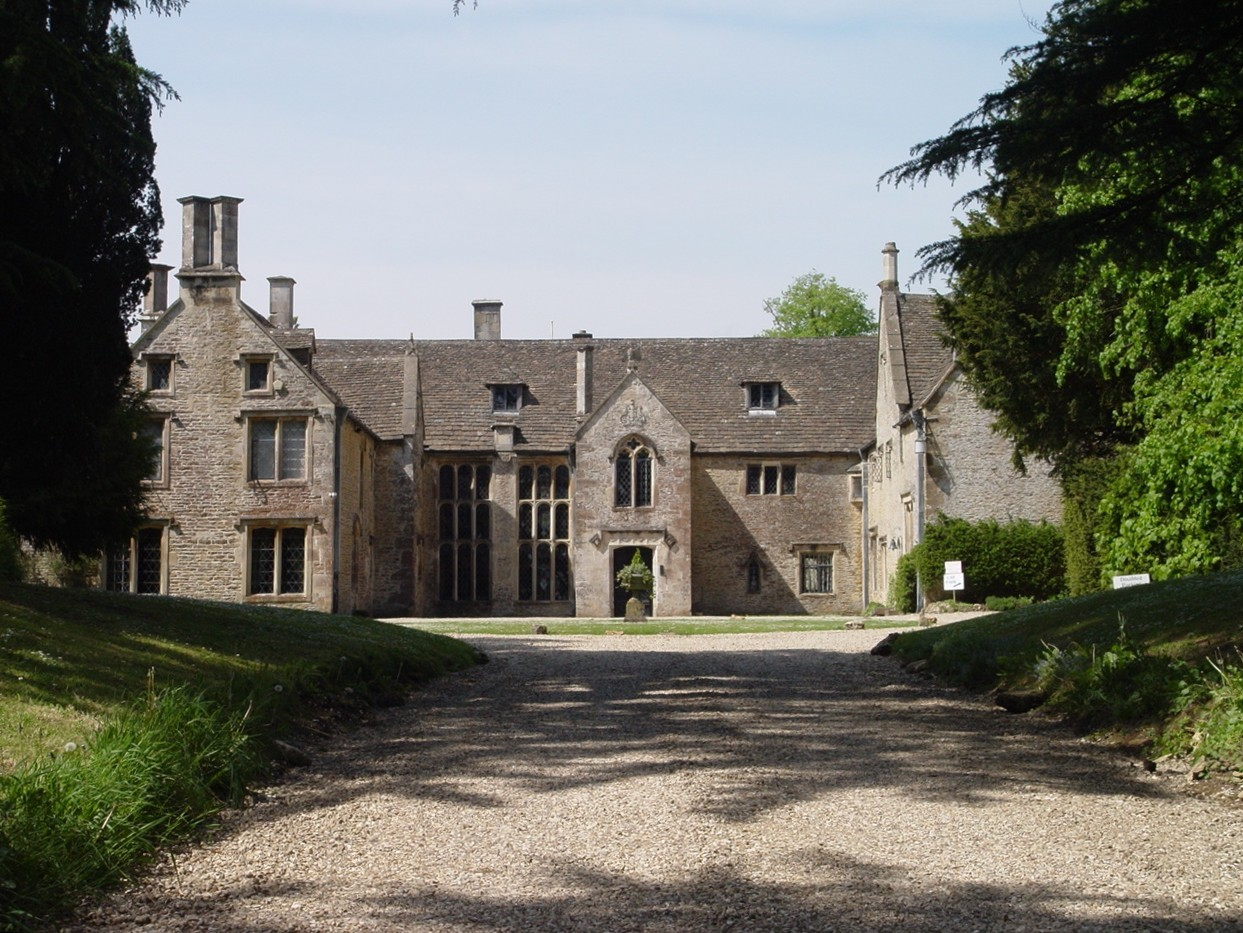
Chavenage House

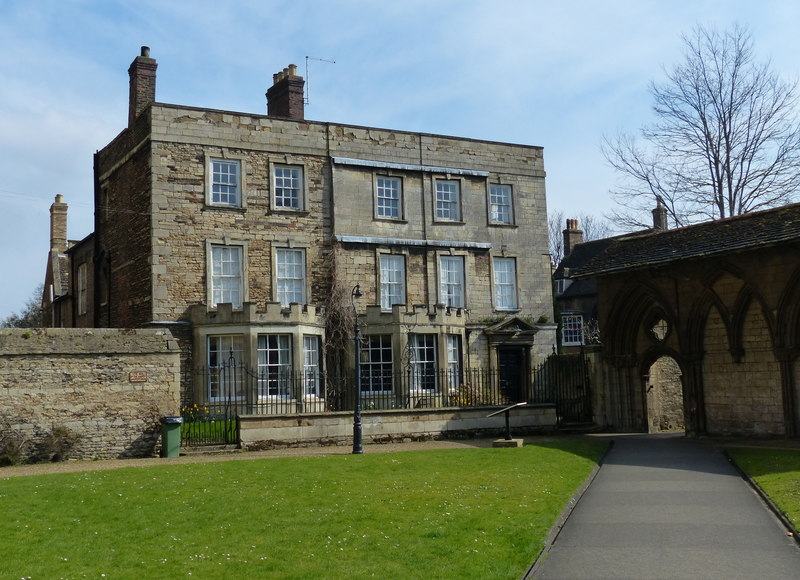
Laurel Court, Vineyard Road, Peterborough

- Peterborough Cathedral
- Chavenage House, Tetbury, Gloucestershire
- Abbots Gate, Peterborough Cathedral
- The Deanery, Gravel Walk, Peterborough Cathedral
- Laurel Court, Vineyard Road, Peterborough
- Breamore House, Fordingbridge

== Awards ==
The series won a BAFTA award for Design (Chris Pemsel) in 1982, also being nominated for Drama Series/Serial (Jonathan Powell, David Giles), Costume Design (Juanita Waterson), Graphics (Stewart Austin), Make Up (Elizabeth Rowell), Sound Supervisor (Chick Anthony), Video Cameraman (Geoff Feld), and Video Lighting (Howard King).
