= Harry Richardson (actor) =

Australian actor (born 1993)

- Born: Harry Richardson; 3 March 1993 (age 33); Sydney, New South Wales, Australia
- Education: Royal Academy of Dramatic Art (London); Western Australian Academy of Performing Arts (Perth)
- Occupation: Actor
- Years active: 2015–present

Harry Richardson (born 3 March 1993) is an Australian actor. He has starred in the television series Doctor Thorne (2016), Poldark (2017–2019), and The Gilded Age (2022–present).

== Early life and education ==
Richardson was born in Sydney, Australia, before moving to London at the age of two. At the age of 12, he went back to Australia for high school at Sydney Grammar School, where he discovered his love for acting, and returned to the U.K. when he was 18. He did a short course at the Royal Academy of Dramatic Art in London before enrolling at the Western Australian Academy of Performing Arts in Perth in 2012.

== Career ==
Richardson's first film was Looking for Grace in which he starred as Jamie. He auditioned for the role of Frank Gresham in the television series Doctor Thorne when visiting family in London and attended "an audition in the morning before [his] flight back to Australia". He then starred in Poldark, from the third season onward, as Drake Carne. He appeared in the 2017 film Dunkirk "for a second", but described the experience as a "teaser to a dream that I want to actualize". In 2019, he starred in the political drama series Total Control as Senator Irving's Adviser Jonathan Cosgrove. He has played Larry Russell in HBO's The Gilded Age since 2022. He has also appeared in Not Suitable for Work on Hulu in 2026.

== Filmography ==
=== Film ===
Year	Title	Role	Notes
2015	Looking for Grace	Jamie	
2017	Dunkirk	Private	
2019	I've Been Thinking About What You Look Like	Maxwell	Short film

=== Television ===
Year	Title	Role	Notes
2016	Doctor Thorne	Frank Gresham	4 episodes
2017–2019	Poldark	Drake Carne	25 episodes
2018	Death in Paradise	Gabe Lee	Episode: "Meditated in Murder"
2019	Total Control	Jonathan Cosgrove	6 episodes
2022–present	The Gilded Age	Larry Russell	25 episodes
2026	Not Suitable for Work	Austin Blanchett	7 episodes

=== Theatre ===
Year	Play	Role	Production company
2013	The Golden Age	Peter	Western Australian Academy of Performing Arts
2013	No Worries	Singer; Turbo Tongue	Western Australian Academy of Performing Arts
2013	As You Like It	Le Beau; Amiens	Western Australian Academy of Performing Arts
2013	Chekhov in Yalta	Chekhov	Western Australian Academy of Performing Arts
2013	Hour of the Wolf	Mr. Kreisler	Western Australian Academy of Performing Arts
2014	Arturo Ui	Old Dogsborough	Western Australian Academy of Performing Arts
2014	Festen	Lars	Western Australian Academy of Performing Arts
2014	Great Expectations	Herbert	Western Australian Academy of Performing Arts

=== Radio ===
Year	Title	Role	Production company
2017	Snake	Jarrod	BBC Radio 4

== Awards and nominations ==
Year	Association	Category	Work	Result	Ref.
2023	Screen Actors Guild Awards	Outstanding Performance by an Ensemble in a Drama Series	The Gilded Age	Nominated	
