= Walter Allen Jenkins =

English academic

- Born: 1 April 1891; Rotherham, West Riding of Yorkshire, England
- Died: 26 September 1958 (aged 67)
- Education: Sheffield University; Cambridge University
- Occupations: academic administrator, professor of physics

Walter Allen Jenkins (1 April 1891 – 26 September 1958) was an English academic. He served as the 7th vice-chancellor of the University of Dhaka during 1953–1956.

== Education ==
Jenkins graduated from Emmanuel College in London. Later he obtained a D.Sc. degree from Sheffield University in 1925 and Legum Doctor degree from Cambridge University.

== Career ==
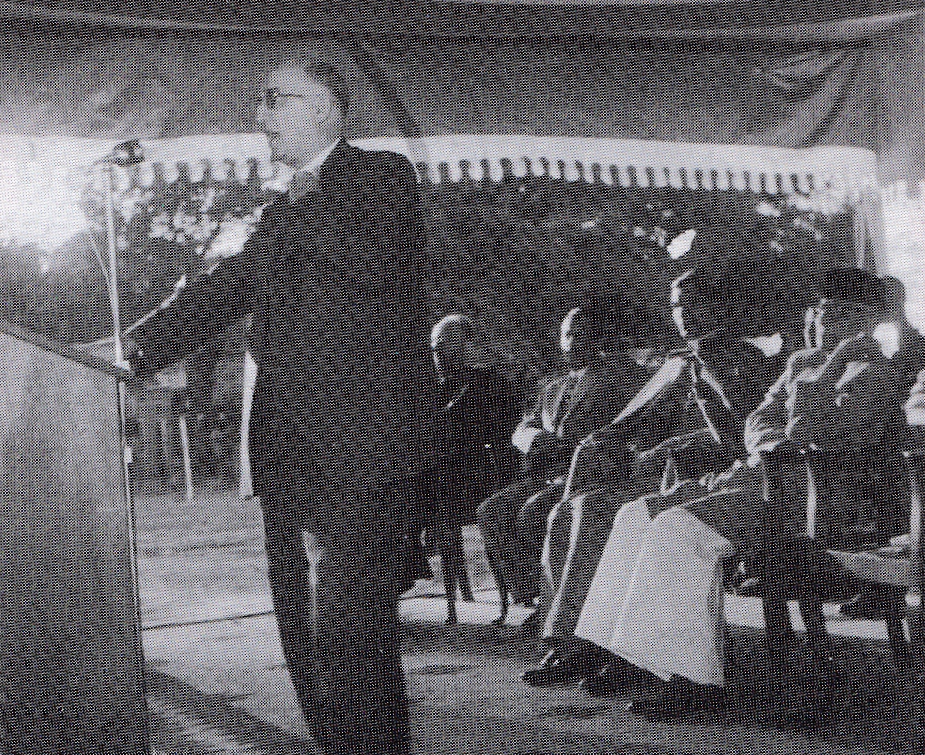
Walter A. Jenkins giving his speech at the foundation laying ceremony of Notre Dame College, Dhaka when he was serving as the Vice Chancellor of Dhaka University.

Jenkins started his career at the Indian Education Service in 1916. He then served as a professor of physics at Dhaka College. In 1921, he joined University of Dhaka as a professor and head of the Department of Physics. In 1926, he was appointed as a Special Officer to the Government of Bengal and he acted as the divisional inspector of schools in Chittagong until 1933.

Jenkins served as the secretary to the Government of Bengal during 1945–47.

Jenkins was the first registrar of the University College of North Staffordshire (later became Keele University) during 1949–1953. In November 1953, he joined the University of Dhaka as the vice-chancellor.
