= János Majláth =

Hungarian writer and historian

János Majláth, Count (5 October 1786 – 3 January 1855), Hungarian historian and poet, was born at Pest.

First educated at home, he subsequently studied philosophy at Eger (Erlau) and law at Győr (Raab), his father, Count Joseph Majlath, an Austrian minister of state, eventually obtaining for him an appointment in the public service. Majláth devoted himself to historical research and the translation into German of Magyar folk-tales, and of selections from the works of the best of his country's native poets. Moreover, as an original lyrical writer, and as an editor and adapter of old German poems, Majlath showed considerable talent.

During the greater part of his life he resided either at Pest or Vienna, but a few years before his death he removed to Munich, where he fell into a state of destitution and extreme despondency. Seized at last by a terrible infatuation, he and his daughter Henriette, who had long been his constant companion and amanuensis, drowned themselves in the Lake of Starnberg, a few miles south-west of Munich, on 3 January 1855.

Of his historical works the most important are the Geschichte der Magyaren (Vienna, 1828–1831, 5 vols; 2nd ed., Ratisbon, 1852–1853) and his Geschichte des Österreichischen Kaiserstaats (Hamburg, 1834 1850, 5 vols).

Especially noteworthy among his metrical translations from the Hungarian are the Magyarische Gedichte (Stuttgart and Tübingen, 1825); and Himfys auserlesene Liebeslieder (Pest, 1829; 2nd ed., 1831). A valuable contribution to folk-lore appeared in the Magyarische Sagen, Marchen und Erzahlungen (Brünn, 1825; 2nd ed., Stuttgart and Tübingen, 1837, 2, vols).
