= David Giles (director) =

British television director

David Giles (18 October 1926 – 6 January 2010) was a British television director.

== Credits ==
- Hetty Wainthropp Investigates
  - Family Values (1998)
  - Something to Treasure (1998)
  - How Time Flies (1998)
  - Daughter of the Regiment (1997)
  - All Stitched Up (1997)
- Just William (1994)
- The Darling Buds of May
  - The Happiest Days of Your Lives: Part 1 (1993)
  - The Happiest Days of Your Lives: Part 2 (1993)
  - Oh! to Be in England: Part 1 (1992)
  - Oh! to Be in England: Part 2 (1992)
  - Christmas Is Coming (1991)
- Forever Green
  - Episodes i.1, 2, 5, 6 (1989)
- Hannay
  - The Fellowship of the Black Stone (1988)
- London Embassy (1987)
- Miss Marple: A Murder is Announced (1985)
- King John (1984)
- Mansfield Park (1983)
- The Barchester Chronicles (1982)
- Fame Is the Spur (1982)
- The BBC Shakespeare: The Life of Henry the Fifth (1979)
- Henry IV, Part II (1979)
- Henry IV, Part I (1979)
- King Richard the Second (1978)
- The Mayor of Casterbridge (1978)
- The Emigrants (1976)
- Play of the Month
  - When We Are Married (1975)
  - The Recruiting Officer (1973)
- Twelfth Night (1974)
- The Strauss Family (1972)
- Sense and Sensibility (1971)
- Hamlet (1970)
- A Family At War (1970)
- The First Churchills (1969)
- The Dance of Death (1969)
- Resurrection (1968)
- Vanity Fair (1967)
- The Forsyte Saga (1967)
- The Old Wives' Table (1964)
- Compact (1962)
