= The Warden =

Novel by Anthony Trollope

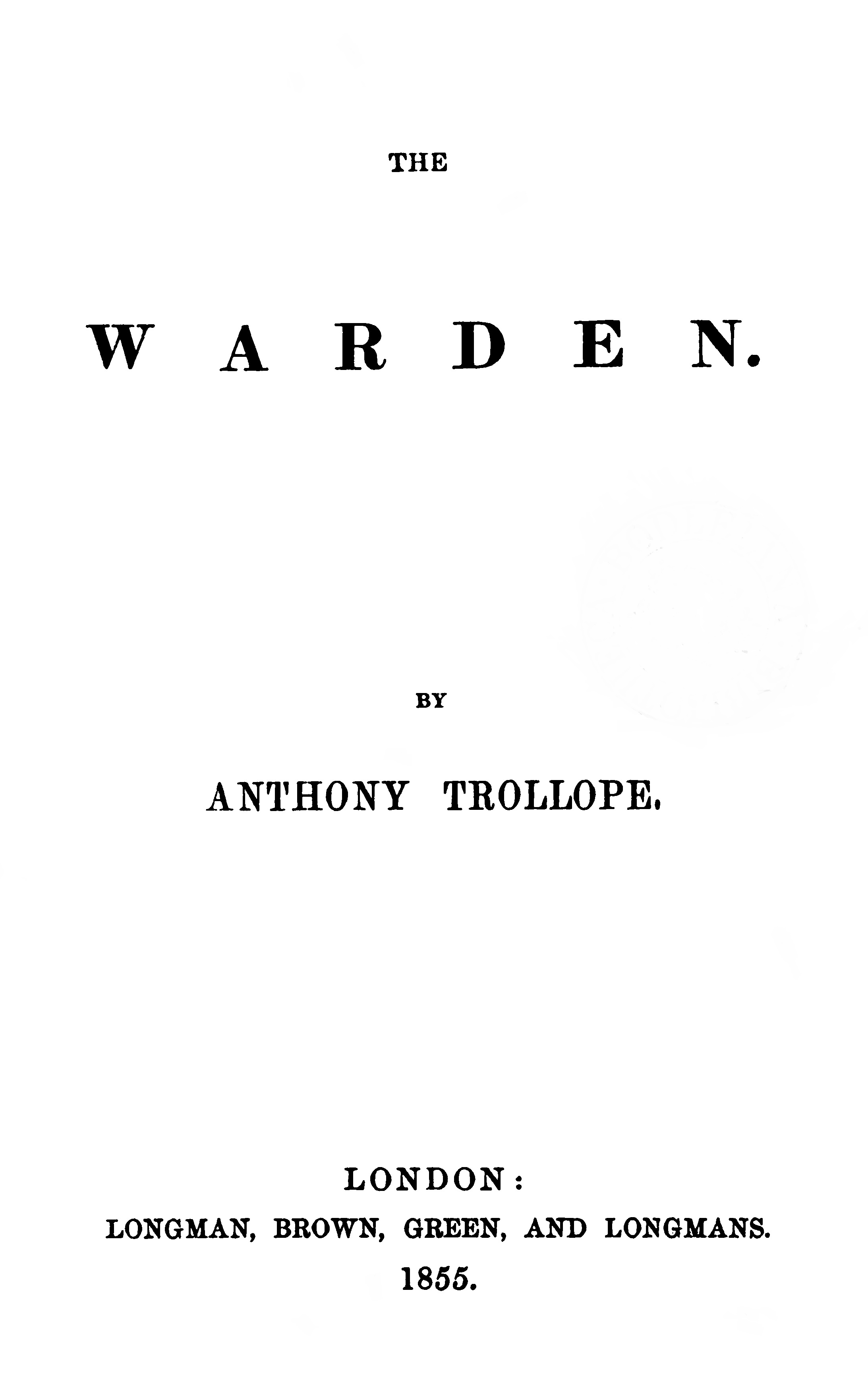
- First edition title page
- Author: Anthony Trollope
- Language: English
- Series: Chronicles of Barsetshire
- Genre: novel
- Publisher: Longman, Brown, Green, and Longmans
- Publication date: 5 January 1855
- Publication place: England
- Media type: Print
- Followed by: Barchester Towers
- Text: The Warden at Wikisource

The Warden is a novel by English author Anthony Trollope published by Longman in 1855. It is the first book in the Chronicles of Barsetshire series, followed by Barchester Towers.

== Synopsis ==
Mr Septimus Harding is the meek, widowed and elderly warden of Hiram's Hospital and precentor of Barchester Cathedral, in the fictional county of Barsetshire.

Hiram's Hospital is an almshouse supported by a medieval charitable bequest to the Diocese of Barchester. The income maintains the almshouse itself, supports its twelve bedesmen, and provides a comfortable abode and living for its warden. Mr Harding was appointed to this position through the patronage of his old friend the Bishop of Barchester, who is also the father of Archdeacon Grantly, to whom Harding's older daughter, Susan, is married. The warden, who lives with his other child, his unmarried younger daughter Eleanor, performs his duties conscientiously.

The story concerns the impact upon Harding and his circle when a zealous young reformer, John Bold, launches a campaign to expose the disparity in the apportionment of the charity's income between its object, the bedesmen, and its warden, Mr Harding. John Bold embarks on this campaign in a spirit of public duty despite his romantic involvement with Eleanor and previously cordial relations with Mr Harding. Bold starts a lawsuit and Mr Harding is advised by Dr Grantly to stand his ground.

Bold attempts to enlist the support of the press and engages the interest of The Jupiter (a fictitious newspaper modelled on The Times) whose editor, Tom Towers, pens editorials supporting reform of the charity, and presenting a portrait of Mr Harding as selfish and derelict in his conduct of his office. This image is taken up by commentators Dr Pessimist Anticant, and Mr Popular Sentiment, who have been seen as caricatures of Thomas Carlyle and Charles Dickens respectively.

Ultimately, despite much browbeating by the Archdeacon and the favourable legal opinion solicited from the barrister Sir Abraham Haphazard, Mr Harding concludes that he cannot in good conscience continue to accept such generous remuneration, and resigns the office of warden. John Bold, who has appealed in vain to Tom Towers to lessen personal criticism of Mr Harding, returns to Barchester where he marries Eleanor after halting legal proceedings.

Those of the bedesmen of the hospital who have allowed their appetite for greater income to estrange them from the warden are reproved by their senior member, Bunce, who has been constantly loyal to Harding, whose good care and understanding heart are now lost to them. At the end of the novel the bishop decides that the wardenship of Hiram's Hospital be left vacant, and none of the bedesmen are offered any extra money. Mr Harding becomes Rector of St Cuthbert's, a small parish near the Cathedral Close, drawing a much smaller income than before.

== Characters ==
- Septimus Harding, the quiet, music-loving Warden of Hiram's Hospital, a widower who has two daughters and is also the precentor of Barchester Cathedral. He becomes the centre of a dispute concerning his substantial income as the hospital's warden.
- Archdeacon Theophilus Grantly, Mr Harding's indefatigable son-in-law, married to Susan Grantley, originally Susan Harding. The archdeacon's father is the Bishop of Barchester. He does not agree with John Bold and is opposed to his father-in-law relinquishing his office.
- Mrs Susan Grantly, Mr Harding's elder daughter and the Archdeacon's wife.
- John Bold, a young surgeon, a zealous church reformer. He is romantically interested in Eleanor Harding, and later drops the lawsuit.
- Mary Bold, John Bold's sister and friend of Eleanor.
- Eleanor Harding, Mr Harding's younger daughter and the romantic interest of John Bold.
- Sir Abraham Haphazard, a renowned London barrister and Attorney General.
- Tom Towers, the editor of the influential newspaper, The Jupiter. He writes an editorial deploring Harding as a greedy clergyman who receives more than he deserves from a sinecure post.
- Bunce, the senior bedesman at Hiram's Hospital, who supports Mr Harding retaining his position.
- Abel Handy, a scheming old bedesman, who is the originator of the conspiracy to acquire more money.

== Historical inspiration ==
Trollope's tale seems to have taken inspiration from the 1849 enquiries by the Rev. Henry Holloway, a Church reformer and vicar of St Faith's Church, Winchester, into the finances of the Hospital of St Cross, Winchester, and the income derived by the institution's Master, Francis North, 6th Earl of Guilford. Guilford's income, however, was conjectured to be in excess of £2,000 a year (£271,010 in 2020), much greater than the £800 (£108,404 in 2020) of the fictional Warden Harding. Trollope makes allusion to the Guilford case and also to the case of Rochester Cathedral Grammar School where in 1849 the headmaster, Robert Whiston, brought a case in the Court of Chancery claiming that the Church of England was misapplying the revenues of many such charitable bequests, including the one funding his own school.

== Criticism ==
In a 2 November 1944 review in the Manchester Evening News, George Orwell called the novel "probably the most successful" of Trollope's "clerical series" and "one of his best works," but noted that Trollope was "a shrewd critic, but no reformer." "A time-honoured abuse, he held, is frequently less bad than its remedy. He builds Archdeacon Grantly up into a thoroughly odious character, and is well aware of his odiousness, but he still prefers him to John Bold ... and the book contains a scarcely veiled attack on Charles Dickens, whose reforming zeal he found it hard to sympathise with."

== Adaptations ==
It was adapted as a BBC television mini-series titled The Warden (1951), which was broadcast live and apparently never recorded.

The BBC adapted The Warden and its sequel, Barchester Towers, into the miniseries The Barchester Chronicles (1982). The first two of the seven one-hour episodes are drawn from The Warden and the rest from the much longer Barchester Towers.
