= Barchester Towers =

1857 novel by Anthony Trollope

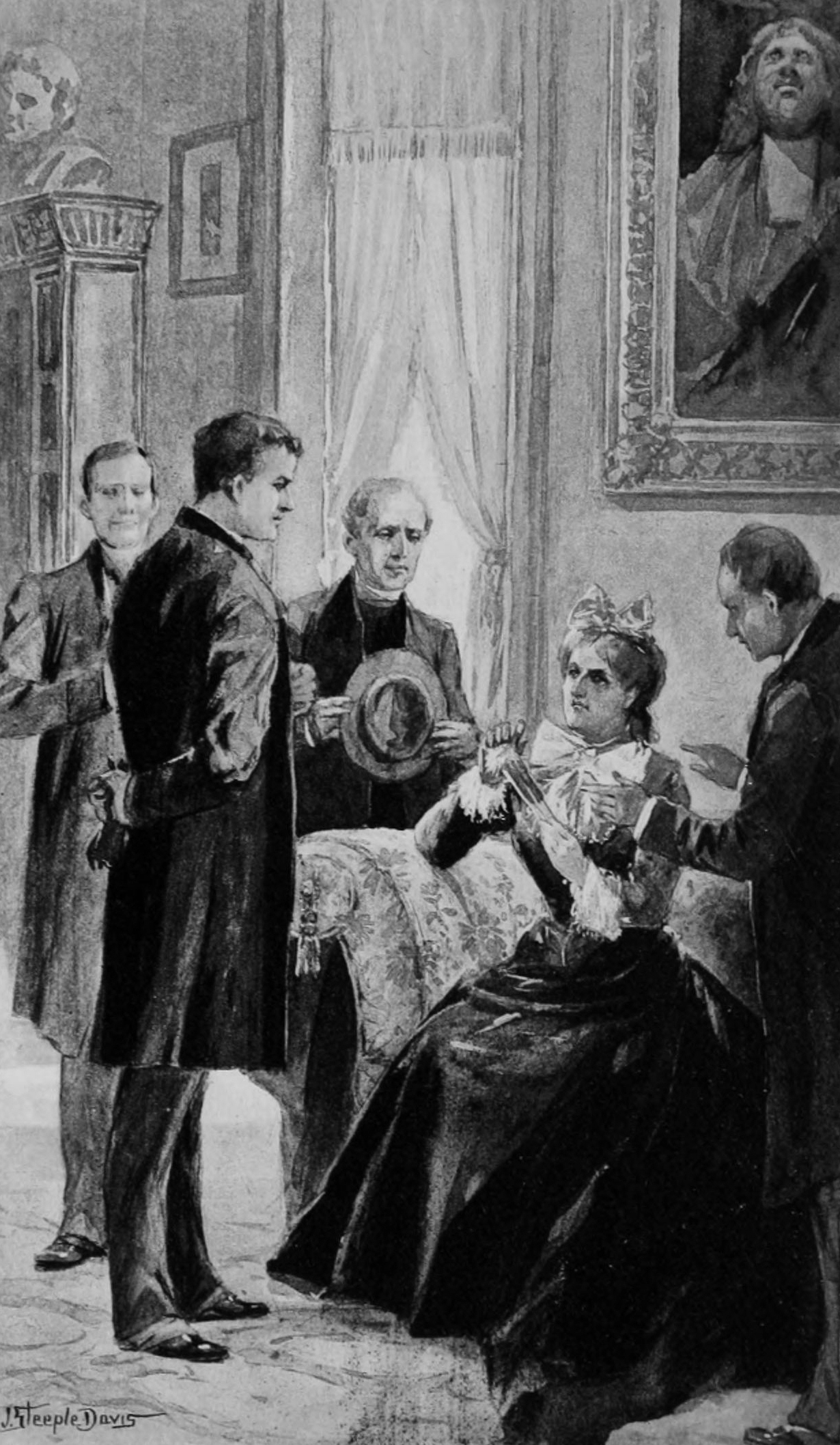
- Mrs Proudie speaking to Archdeacon Grantly at their first meeting
- Author: Anthony Trollope
- Language: English
- Series: Chronicles of Barsetshire
- Genre: Novel; Comedy of manners
- Publisher: Longmans
- Publication date: 1857
- Publication place: United Kingdom
- Media type: Print
- ISBN: 978-1-59547745-3
- Dewey Decimal: 823.87
- LC Class: PR5684 .B3
- Preceded by: The Warden
- Followed by: Doctor Thorne
- Text: Barchester Towers at Wikisource
- Website: https://trollopesociety.org/book/barchester-towers/

Barchester Towers is a novel by English author Anthony Trollope published by Longmans in 1857. It is the second book in the Chronicles of Barsetshire series, preceded by The Warden and followed by Doctor Thorne.

In his autobiography Trollope wrote "In the writing of Barchester Towers I took great delight. The bishop and Mrs. Proudie were very real to me, as were also the troubles of the archdeacon and the loves of Mr. Slope". When he submitted his finished work, his publisher, William Longman, initially turned it down, finding much of it to be full of "vulgarity and exaggeration". In 2009 The Guardian said: "Barchester Towers is many readers' favourite Trollope", including it in its 2009 list of "1000 novels everyone must read".

== Plot summary ==
Barchester Towers concerns the leading clergy of the fictional cathedral city of Barchester. The much loved bishop having died, all expectations are that his son, Archdeacon Grantly, will succeed him. Owing to the passage of the power of patronage to a new Prime Minister, a newcomer, the far more Evangelical Bishop Proudie, gains the see. His wife, Mrs Proudie, exercises an undue influence over the new bishop, making herself as well as the bishop unpopular with most of the clergy of the diocese. Her interference, leading the Bishop to veto the reappointment of the universally popular Mr Septimus Harding (protagonist of Trollope's earlier novel, The Warden) as warden of Hiram's Hospital, is not well received, even though she seeks to have the position given to a needy clergyman, Mr Quiverful, who has a wife and 14 children to support.

Even less popular than Mrs Proudie is the bishop's new chaplain, the hypocritical and sycophantic Mr Obadiah Slope, who decides it would be expedient to marry Harding's wealthy widowed daughter, Eleanor Bold. Slope hopes to win her favour by interfering in the controversy over the wardenship, in favour of Mr Harding. The Bishop, or rather Mr Slope under the direction of Mrs Proudie, also orders the return of the prebendary Dr Vesey Stanhope from Italy. Stanhope has been in Italy recovering from a sore throat for 12 years and has spent his time catching butterflies. With him to the Cathedral Close come his wife and their three adult children. The younger of Dr Stanhope's two daughters causes consternation in the Palace and threaten the plans of Mr Slope. Signora Madeline Vesey Neroni is a disabled flirt with a young daughter and a mysterious Italian husband, whom she has left. Mrs Proudie is appalled and considers her an unsafe influence on her daughters, servants and, indeed, Mr Slope. Mr Slope is drawn like a moth to a flame, and cannot keep away from the Signora. Dr Stanhope's artistic son Bertie is skilled at spending money and flitting from obsession to obsession (painting, Judaism, sculpting); his sisters think marriage to rich Eleanor Bold will help him settle down.

Summoned by Archdeacon Grantly to assist in the war against the Proudies and Mr Slope is the Reverend Francis Arabin. Mr Arabin is a considerable scholar, Fellow of Lazarus College at the University of Oxford, who nearly followed his mentor John Henry Newman into the Roman Catholic Church. A misunderstanding occurs between Eleanor and her father, brother-in-law, sister and Mr Arabin, who think that she intends to marry Mr Slope, much to their disgust. Mr Arabin is attracted to Eleanor, but the efforts of Grantly and his wife to stop her marrying Slope interfere with any relationship that might develop. At the Ullathorne garden party held by the Thornes, matters come to a head. Mr Slope proposes to Mrs Bold and is slapped for his presumption; Bertie goes through the motions of a proposal to Eleanor and is refused with good grace, and the Signora has a chat with Mr Arabin. Mr Slope's double-dealings are now revealed and he is dismissed by both Mrs Proudie and the Signora. The Signora drops a delicate word in several ears and with the removal of the misunderstanding, Mr Arabin and Eleanor become engaged.

The Dean of the Cathedral having died, Mr Slope campaigns to become the new Dean but Mr Harding is offered the preferment, with a beautiful house in the Close and fifteen acres of garden. Mr Harding considers himself unsuitable and with the help of the archdeacon, arranges that Mr Arabin be made Dean. With the Stanhopes' return to Italy, life in the Cathedral Close returns to normal and Mr Harding continues his life of gentleness and music.

== Structure ==
The literary scholar John Sutherland observes that Trollope suspended work on the novel (having reached the end of Chapter VIII) between February 1855 and May 1856, turning instead to his posthumously published The New Zealander. During this time he changed his idea of writing a short novel (similar in length to The Warden) to a longer one, and that from this hiatus there arise a number of inconsistencies in the text. In the first chapter Trollope says that Bishop Grantley is dying in "the latter days of July" and that Proudie became bishop "just a month after his [Grantly's] demise". At the beginning of Chapter IX, Sutherland observes that Trollope has Proudie three months onto his term as Bishop - effectively late November. However at the beginning of Chapter XII Slope is writing a letter dated 20 August, and in Chapters XXXIII and XXXV it is made clear that Miss Thorne's fête champêtre takes place on the last day of September. In Chapter XLVIII Arabin proposes to Eleanor on "a beautiful afternoon in the beginning of October".

Sutherland points out that in the early chapters Trollope describes the Proudies as intending to spend as much time as possible in London, leaving the field clear for Slope to act on his own in Barchester with the action easily contained in a single-volume novel: in Chapter IV, Slope thinks to himself that, in the Proudies' anticipated absences in London, "he, therefore, he, Mr Slope, would in effect be bishop of Barchester". But when Trollope resumed the composition of Barchester Towers in May 1856, planning the eventual three-volume novel as a result of the unexpectedly increasing sales of The Warden in late 1855, he expanded the text by keeping the Proudies in Barchester and introducing a number of new characters who had not appeared in the earlier chapters - the Stanhopes, Mr Arabin, and the Thornes among others.

And although Sutherland notes that Trollope was "often indifferent to minor inconsistencies in his narratives", he regards these lapses as showing the point at which Trollope conceived the idea of the novel series which would eventually become the hugely successful Chronicles of Barsetshire.

== Characters ==
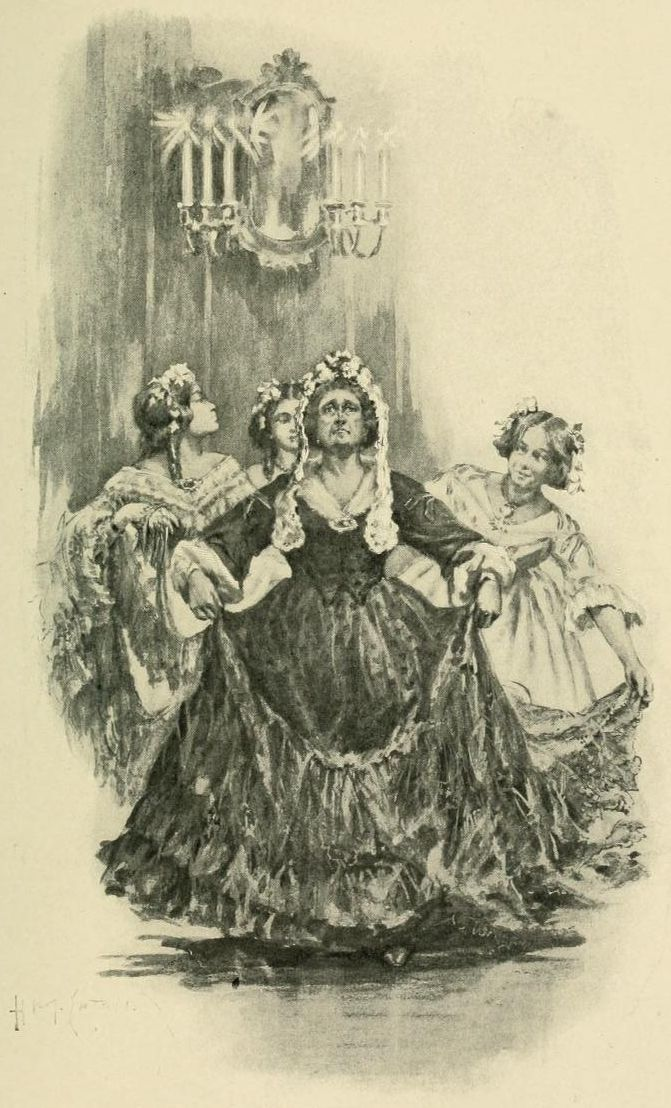
Scene from Chapter XI (illustrated by Hugh M. Eaton): Mrs. Proudie and her daughters flee a party after Mrs Proudie's dress is accidentally torn apart.

=== High Church faction ===
- Mr Septimus Harding is the meek, elderly precentor of Barchester and Rector of the church of St. Cuthbert's near the Cathedral Close. He was formerly Warden of Hiram's Hospital but resigned in The Warden.
- Archdeacon Grantly, Dr Theophilus Grantly, is the son of the former Bishop of Barchester, Dr Grantly senior, who dies at the start of the novel. Married to Susan Grantly, originally Susan Harding, he has three sons (Charles James, Henry, and Samuel) and two daughters (Florinda and Griselda) and lives at Plumstead Episcopi. His sister-in-law is Mrs Eleanor Bold, née Harding.
- Mrs Susan Grantly, Mr Harding's elder daughter and the Archdeacon's wife.
- Mr Francis Arabin, vicar of St Ewold, Old Wykehamist, Fellow of Lazarus College and former professor of poetry at the University of Oxford. He is a former follower of John Henry Newman and adheres to the High Church faction of the Anglican Church. Arabin is sought out by Dr Grantly as an ally against the evangelical faction of Bishop Proudie, his wife and chaplain Obadiah Slope.
- Dr Gwynne, Master of Lazarus College, another ally.

=== Low Church faction ===
- Bishop Proudie, apparently henpecked, weak-willed and under the influence of his wife Mrs Proudie and chaplain Obadiah Slope concerning the matters of the see.
- Mrs Proudie, a proud, vulgar, domineering wife, who promotes evangelical causes such as Sunday schools and is zealous in eliminating high-church rituals.
- Mr Obadiah Slope, a wheedling, oleaginous chaplain who has much influence over Bishop Proudie. Midway through the novel Slope decides that he will marry Mrs Eleanor Bold. Formerly Mrs Proudie's ally, he comes into conflict with her over the wardenship of Hiram's Hospital and she comes to regard him as a traitor. The narrator speculates that he is a lineal descendant of Doctor Slop from the novel Tristram Shandy. He has been described as a significant sycophant: "[epitomizing] the lick up/kick down sycophant — fawning with the powerful, tyrannical with subordinates".

=== Others ===
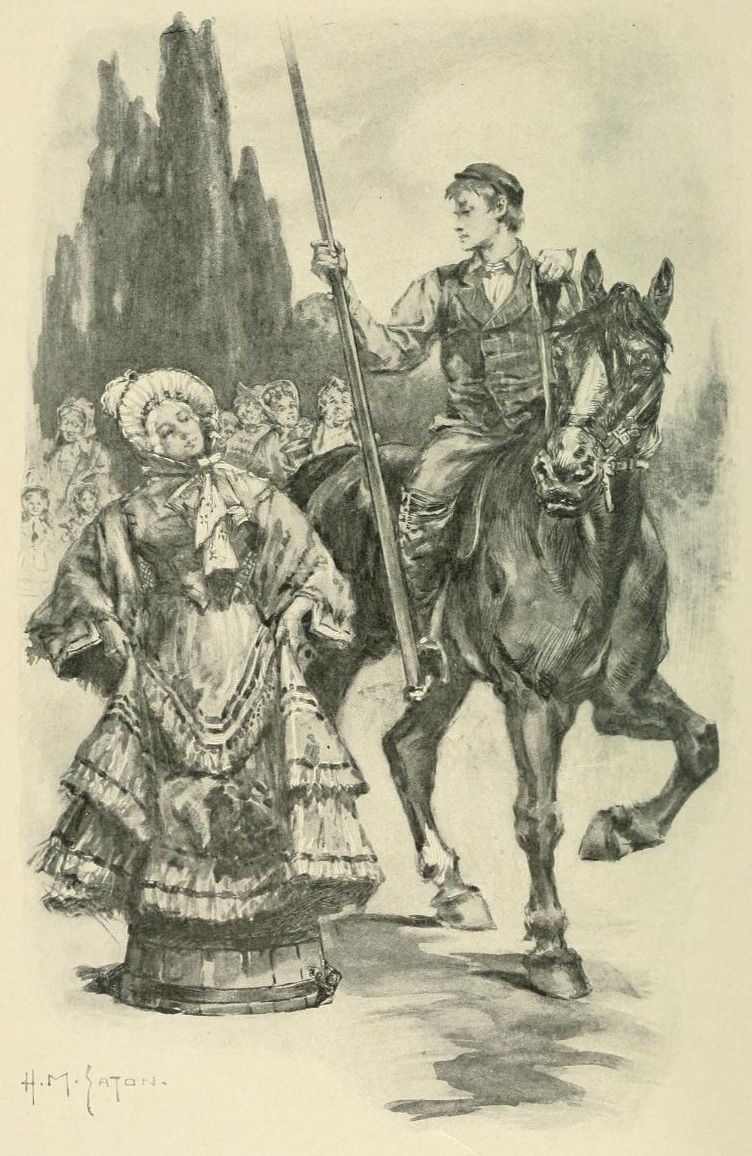
Illustration of a scene from Chapter XXXVI: Miss Thorne and Harry Greenacre; Greenacre is attired for the quintain.

- Mrs Eleanor Bold, widow of Doctor John Bold, with an infant son; she is the younger daughter of Mr Septimus Harding. She has three potential suitors, Mr Obadiah Slope, Mr Bertie Stanhope and Mr Francis Arabin.
- Miss Mary Bold, sister of John Bold and therefore Mrs Bold's sister-in-law.
- Dr Vesey Stanhope is the rector of Crabtree Canonicorum and of Stogpingum, in the diocese of Barchester, and a prebendary of Barchester Cathedral. He and his family lived for twelve years in Italy before being recalled by Bishop Proudie on Mr Slope's advice. He has two daughters, Charlotte and Madeline, and a son, Ethelbert (Bertie).
- Signora Madeline Vesey Neroni née Madeline Stanhope is the beautiful younger daughter of Dr Vesey Stanhope, given to inflation of her own status- "her father had been christened Vesey as another man is christened Thomas, and she had no more right to assume it than would have the daughter of a Mr Josiah Jones to call herself Mrs Josiah Smith, on marrying a man of the latter name"; her card bears "a bright gilt coronet", despite the fact that her husband, Paulo Neroni, "had had not the faintest title to call himself a scion of even Italian nobility". Lamed by her abusive Italian husband, she is disabled and needs to be carried around the house on a sofa, although this does not stop her constantly flirting with men. She has a young daughter, Julia, whom she calls “the last of the Neros.”
- Ethelbert "Bertie" Stanhope is the only son of Dr Vesey Stanhope. An idling, carefree man who never settles down, he is a gifted artist, who borrows and spends a great deal and earns nothing. His sister Charlotte advises him to woo the rich and beautiful widow Eleanor Bold.
- Charlotte Stanhope is the polymath elder daughter of Dr Vesey Stanhope; she challenges Eleanor Bold to comment on the theological arguments concerning intelligent life on other worlds as presented by William Whewell and David Brewster. She is the manager of the family and a good friend of Eleanor Bold until Eleanor realises Charlotte is the primary instigator of her brother wooing her.
- Mr Quiverful, a poor clergyman with 14 children who becomes the new Warden of Hiram's Hospital. (Note: The character's name is inspired by Psalm 127: "Children are a heritage from the Lord…Like arrows in the hands of a warrior…Blessed is the man whose quiver is full of them".)
- Mrs Letty Quiverful, his wife.
- Wilfred Thorne, the squire of St Ewold's. A bachelor of about fifty who comes under the charms of Signora Neroni.
- Miss Monica Thorne, Wilfred's spinster sister of about sixty, who is an extreme traditionalist. She holds a garden party at their family residence, Ullathorne, for the notables of Barsetshire.

== Adaptations ==
The Warden and Barchester Towers were filmed by the BBC as The Barchester Chronicles in 1982.
