= Barsetshire =

Fictional county in Anthony Trollope novels

- Chronicles of Barsetshire location
- 1953 map by Maurice Weightman published as endpapers for Thirkell's Jutland Cottage
- Created by: Anthony Trollope
- Genre: Novels

In-universe information
- Type: Fictional county
- Locations: Barchester, Silverbridge, Hogglestock
- Characters: Mr Septimus Harding, Bishop and Mrs Proudie, Dr Thomas Thorne, Archdeacon Theophilus Grantly

Barsetshire is a fictional English county created by Anthony Trollope in the series of novels known as the Chronicles of Barsetshire (1855–1867). The county town and cathedral city is Barchester. Other towns named in the novels include Silverbridge, Hogglestock and Greshamsbury.

== Origins ==
According to E. A. Freeman, Trollope conceded to him that Barset was in origin Somerset, although Barchester itself was primarily inspired by Winchester. Other West Country counties such as Dorset also contributed, and Gatherum Castle, for example, was imported from elsewhere, but important elements such as Plumstead Episcopi were drawn directly from Somerset life, in this case Huish Episcopi. In sum, Barset was (in Trollope's own words) "a little bit of England which I have myself created".

== Political structure ==
In Doctor Thorne Trollope describes how the county, formerly represented by a single parliamentary constituency, was split into two constituencies, the more rural East Barsetshire, which includes Barchester, and the more commercial West Barsetshire, by the Reform Act 1832. The borough of Silverbridge, according to Trollope's Palliser novels, also elects a Member of Parliament.

== Interpretation ==
Adam Gopnik wrote in The New Yorker, "The six Barsetshire novels... are as much a triumph of the sympathetic imagination as Tolkien's books: it is an entirely invented world, which Trollope entered by transposing his broader knowledge of how the world works onto the inner workings of a cathedral town. The beauty of the idea, though, was that it gave him a way to condense into comedy the crisis of his time: in an age of reform, what would happen to the most conservative and settled institution in England when reform arrived for it, too?"

== Later fictional usage ==
The novel Barchester Pilgrimage (1935), and some of the episodes in Let Dons Delight (1939), both by Ronald Knox, refer to Barsetshire and its inhabitants.

Barsetshire was also used as the setting for a series of 29 novels by Angela Thirkell, written from 1930 to 1961. Thirkell's stories blend social satire with romance. Her 1946 novel, Private Enterprise, explored discontent with the bureaucracy of the Attlee government – something echoed by Orville Prescott in his poem-review beginning "In Barchester all is not well". Thirkell's final Barsetshire book, Three Score and Ten, was completed posthumously, and published in 1961.

Barsetshire is also used as the setting for Carola Oman's Somewhere in England (Hodder and Stoughton 1943), the sequel to her Nothing to Report (Hodder and Stoughton 1940).

Barsetshire is also used in some of the Pullein-Thompson sisters books, usually referring to rival teams or as a nearby county.

Barchester and Barset were used as names for the fictional county in which St Trinians School was supposedly located in the original films.

The county is also mentioned in Michael Innes's Appleby and Honeybath where it is suggested that "the shifting of county boundaries has pretty well done away with Barsetshire" (p 27).

Kevin Kwan's novel Rich People Problems names Barsetshire and the village of Barchester as the family home of Lucien Montagu-Scott and his wife, Colette Bing.

In Vote, Vote, Vote for Nigel Barton, Dennis Potter's 1965 teleplay, the title character runs unsuccessfully for election as a Labour candidate in the rural constituency of West Barsetshire.

HMS Barsetshire, an obsolete County class cruiser, is the training ship for officer candidates in John Winton's 1959 novel We Joined The Navy.

The Duke of Barset is a character in the 1967 film Jules Verne's Rocket to the Moon.

=== Barchester ===
Barchester is used as a railway station and location for some of the 1942 Ealing Studios film The Black Sheep of Whitehall.

Barchester Cathedral was used as the setting for the ghost story "The Stalls of Barchester Cathedral" by M. R. James in his 1911 collection More Ghost Stories of an Antiquary. It is also the setting for Charlie Lovett's 2017 literary mystery The Lost Book of the Grail; or, A Visitor's Guide to Barchester Cathedral.

William Golding refers to Barchester and its cathedral in passing in his 1967 novel The Pyramid, set in the small fictional market town of Stilbourne.

In J. L. Carr's 1975 novella How Steeple Sinderby Wanderers Won the F.A. Cup, the title team play in the Barchester & District League. During the story, they play Barchester City (known as the Holy Boys) at home in an FA Cup qualifier.

== See also ==
- Borsetshire
- Deep England
