= 1826 in literature =

This article contains information about the literary events and publications of 1826.

== Events ==
- Early months – Aftermath of the Decembrist revolt in the Russian Empire. Michael Lunin, though not involved in the Decembrist conspiracy, is arrested and deported to Siberia, which allows him to begin his work as a philosopher. Adam Mickiewicz, deported from Congress Poland for his involvement with Filaret Association, is moved from Taurida Governorate to Moscow. Here, he publishes his Sonety krymskie (The Crimean Sonnets). Later in the year, he befriends several Russian writers, including Yevgeny Baratynsky, Mikhail Pogodin, Alexander Pushkin, and the Lyubomudry. Pushkin, himself returning from political exile, still writes poems discreetly honoring the Decembrists. They include Stansy (Stanzas), as well as odes to Nikolay Mordvinov and Ivan Pushchin.
- c. January – Japanese poet Kobayashi Issa, pained by his recent divorce, enters his final creative period with hokku expressing his solitude and, at times, nihilistic thoughts.
- January 15 – The French newspaper Le Figaro begins publication in Paris. In this first edition, it is a satirical weekly, reflecting the preoccupation of its two founders, Maurice Alhoy and Étienne Arago.
- January 17 – The Ballantyne printing business in Edinburgh crashes, ruining Sir Walter Scott as a principal investor. He undertakes to repay his creditors from his writings, although his publisher Archibald Constable also fails. Distress caused by the events contributes to the illness afflicting Scott's wife, Lady Charlotte; she dies in May.
- February 4 – In the Mexican Republic, lithographer Claudio Linati inaugurates El Iris, a "pocket sized" bi-weekly. It is in print until August 2, when its popularization of liberal ideas prompts the intervention of state censors; Linati leaves Mexico later in the year, probably for political reasons.
- February 6
  - First printing of James Fenimore Cooper's The Last of the Mohicans. This is Cooper's first book under contract with Philadelphia publishers Mathew Carey and Isaac Lea, following Charles Wiley's near-bankruptcy and death. It endures as "the most popular novel of the 1820s."
  - Charles L. Force brings printing to the Colony of Liberia and, ten days later, founds the bi-weekly Liberia Herald. Force dies later this year, but his publication is revived in 1830 by John Brown Russwurm.
- February 16 (O. S.: February 4) – Hungarian Serbs gather at Pest to set up Matica srpska, a cultural society dedicated to promoting the works of Serb writers. It sponsors Georgije Magarašević's Serbski Letopis, which remains "one of Europe's oldest, regularly published journals."
- March – Aged eight, the future orator and memoirist Frederick Douglass is lent by his master to the Aulds of Fell's Point, Baltimore. He will remain their house servant, and later their regular slave, until 1838, when he escapes via the Underground Railroad.
- April – Andrés Bello launches his London magazine Repertorio Americano, in which he publishes the final installment of his Las Silvas Americanas, known as Silva a la agricultura de la zona tórrida (Silva for Agriculture in the Torrid Zone). It is sometimes described as a final masterpiece of Neoclassicism in Latin American literature.
- April 16 – Thomas Pringle, a founding figure of South African literature, embarks on his return trip to England. His stay in the Cape Colony leads him to join and publicize for the Anti-Slavery Society.
- May 18 – At Buda, Habsburg Hungary, Wallachian intellectual Dinicu Golescu receives imprimatur for his Însemnare a călătoriei mele (Accounts of My Travels). This pioneering travelog covers extensive trips in Central and Western Europe, which Golescu had begun in 1824. The author documents his own "amazed 'discovery' of the West [and] acceptance of his country's admitted inferiority." As a "manifesto for the new culture" Însemnare promotes Wallachia's passage into the Age of Enlightenment. For the same purpose Golescu sponsors a school on his estate.
- June – Despite having maintained links with the Decembrists, poet Alexander Griboyedov receives a "certificate of loyalism" from the Russian government.

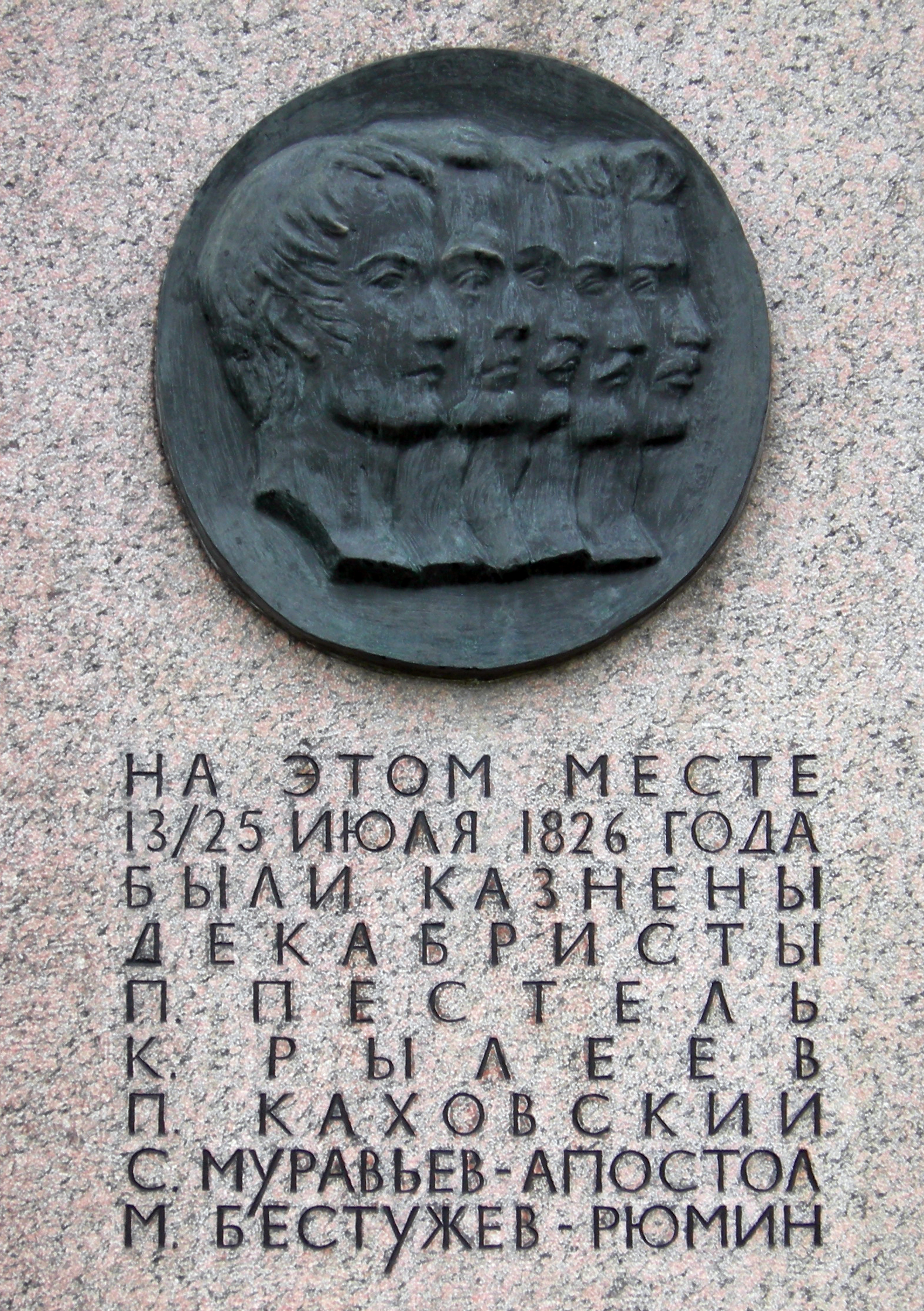
Commemorative plaque for the executed Decembrists at their execution site

- July 25 (O.S.: July 13) – Five Decembrist leaders, including poet Kondraty Ryleyev, are hanged in Senate Square, Saint Petersburg. Pushkin's papers of the time include a drawing of five silhouettes on a scaffold, with the words: "Me too, I could be...".
- August 19 – Louis Christophe François Hachette purchases the Brédif bookshop on rue Pierre-Sarrazin, Paris. This becomes the first asset owned by the Hachette publishing company.
- September – The first issue of Lydia Maria Child's The Juvenile Miscellany, a magazine for children, is published in Boston. Becoming "so popular that children used to sit on their doorsteps waiting for the mail carrier to deliver it," it lasts until 1834.
- October – Tyrone Power gets his break as a principal Irish character actor at the Theatre Royal, Covent Garden in London.
- October 17 – Thomas Carlyle and Jane Welsh marry in Templand and setup home in Edinburgh.
- Late months – First recorded usage of "Quixotism" in Greek (as Δονκιχωτισμός), in a letter from John Caradja to Alexandros Mavrokordatos.
- November
  - Hungarian philologist Sándor Kőrösi Csoma ends his stay at Teta, on the outskirts of Phugtal Monastery in Ladakh.
  - The London Missionary Society sets up the first printing press in Madagascar (Merina Kingdom). It survives to 1836, being ultimately shut down for political reasons.
- December – At Sault Ste. Marie, Michigan, Henry Schoolcraft sets up a review called Literary Voyager, or Muzzeniegan. It includes poems and stories by his part-Ojibwe wife, Jane Johnston Schoolcraft, who thus becomes one of the first Native American literary professionals.
- December 5 (O. S.: November 23) – From his boarding school in Nezhin, Chernigov Governorate, Nikolai Gogol writes home to his mother, describing a "radical new change" in his poetic style. Only two pieces he wrote during this period have survived for posterity.
- c. December 25 – Edgar Allan Poe is forced to renounce his studies at the University of Virginia when his foster parent John Allan refuses to pay for his tuition.
- unknown dates
  - Almeida Garrett issues the poetry anthology Parnaso lusitano (Lusitanian Parnassus), which is both a milestone of Romanticism in Lusophone countries and a cause for debates regarding the emergence of a distinct Brazilian literature. The latter issue is also explored by French historian Jean-Ferdinand Denis, who includes an epilogue on "Brazil's literary history" to his Portuguese literature tract.
  - Robert Morrison, missionary and Bible translator, returns from Malacca to England "with 10,000 Chinese books."
  - Jean-Pierre Abel-Rémusat, who puts out the Mélanges Asiatiques collection, publishes his translation of a Chinese classic: Iu-Kiao-Li, ou Les Deux Cousines.
  - Francesco Vella puts out a translation of Francesco Soave's Trattato elementare dei doveri dell'uomo (Trattat fuk l'Oblighi tal-Bniedem tal-Patri F. Soave), as a textbook for Gozo College Boys' Secondary School. It is one of the first prose works published in the Maltese language.

== New books ==
=== Fiction ===
- Jicontencal. A Spanish Novel on the Conquest of Mexico
- William Harrison Ainsworth – Sir John Chiverton
- Selina Bunbury – The Pastor's Tales
- François-René de Chateaubriand – Les Natchez (published)
- James Fenimore Cooper – The Last of the Mohicans
- Benjamin Disraeli (anonymously) – Vivian Grey
- Joseph Freiherr von Eichendorff – Memoirs of a Good-for-Nothing
- William Nugent Glascock – The Naval Sketch Book, or The Service Afloat and Ashore
- Catherine Gore – The Broken Heart
- Ann Hatton – Deeds of the Olden Time
- Wilhelm Hauff
  - Die Bettlerin vom Pont des Arts (The True Lover's Fortune; or, the Beggar of the Pont des Arts)
  - Lichtenstein
  - Märchen almanach auf das Jahr 1826 (Fairytale Almanac)
  - Mitteilungen aus den Memoiren des Satan (Memoirs of Beelzebub, first part)
- Victor Hugo – Bug-Jargal
- Bernhard Severin Ingemann – Valdemar Seier: En historisk Roman (Valdemar the Victorious: An Historical Romance)
- Thomas Henry Lister – Granby
- Anna Maria Porter – Honor O'Hara
- Jane Porter and Anna Maria Porter – Tales Round a Winter Hearth
- Ann Radcliffe – Gaston de Blondeville
- Jean-Pierre Abel-Rémusat – Iu-Kiao-Li, ou Les Deux Cousines (translation of Iu-Kiao-Li)
- Sir Walter Scott (anonymously) – Woodstock
- Mary Shelley (anonymously) – The Last Man
- Horace Smith – Brambletye House
- Alfred de Vigny – Cinq-Mars

=== Children and young people ===
- Wilhelm Hauff – Märchen Almanach auf das Jahr 1826 (Almanac of Fairy Tales from the Year 1826)
- Rosalia St. Clair – Obstinacy
- Agnes Strickland
  - The Rival Crusoes, or, The Shipwreck
  - A Voyage to Norway
  - The Fisherman's Cottage: Founded on Facts
  - The Young Emigrant

=== Drama ===
- Joanna Baillie – Martyr
- Timotei Cipariu – Ecloga pastorală (Pastoral Eclogue)
- Václav Kliment Klicpera – Veselohra na moste (The Comedy on the Bridge)
- Mary Russell Mitford – Foscari
- John Howard Payne – The French Libertine
- Joseph Isidore Samson – La Belle-Mère et le gendre
- Eugène Scribe – Bertrand et Suzette; ou Le Mariage de raison (The Marriage of Reason)

=== Poetry ===
- Almeida Garrett (editor) – Parnaso lusitano (Lusitanian Parnassus)
- Yevgeny Baratynsky – "Eda"
- Andrés Bello – Silva a la agricultura de la zona tórrida (Silva for Agriculture in the Torrid Zone)
- Alfred de Vigny – Poèmes antiques et modernes (Poems Ancient and Modern)
- Ivan Gundulić – Osman (posthumous)
- Heinrich Heine – Die Harzreise (The Harz Journey)
- Felicia Dorothea Hemans – "Casabianca"
- Robert Hetrick – Poems and Songs of Robert Hetrick
- Andreas Kalvos – Odes nouvelles (New Odes)
- Letitia Elizabeth Landon – "Erinna"
- William Leggett – Journals of the Ocean
- Adam Mickiewicz – Sonety krymskie (The Crimean Sonnets)
- Alexander Pushkin
  - I. I. Pushchinu (To I. I. Pushchin)
  - Morvinovu (To Mordvin)
  - Stansy (Stanzas)
- Charles Tompson – Wild Notes, from the Lyre of a Native Minstrel
- Samuel Woodworth – "The Hunters of Kentucky"

=== Non-fiction ===
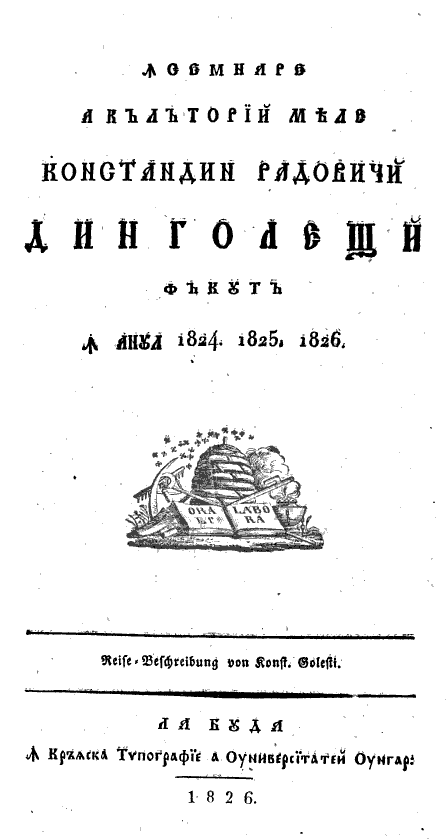
Title page of Însemnare a călătoriei mele in the original Cyrillic print

- Ioan Alexi – Grammatica dacoromana sive valachica (Dacoromanian or Wallachian Grammar)
- Elias Boudinot – "An Address to the Whites"
- Giacomo Casanova – Histoire de ma vie (Story of My Life, posthumous; first authentic edition)
- Victor Collot – Voyage dans l'Amérique Septentrionale (A Journey in North America, posthumous)
- Jean-Ferdinand Denis – Résumé de l'histoire littéraire du Portugal, suivi du résumé de l'histoire littéraire du Brésil (A Review of Portugal's Literary History, Followed by a Review of Brazil's Literary History)
- William Erskine – Memoirs of Babar (translation of Baburnama)
- Dinicu Golescu – Însemnare a călătoriei mele (Accounts of My Travel)
- Wilhelm Hauff – Kontroverspredigt über H. Clauren und den Mann im Mond (Polemical Sermon on H. Clauren)
- William Hazlitt – "Of Persons One Would Wish to Have Seen"
- Dietrich Georg von Kieser – System des Tellurismus oder thierisches Magnetismus (System of Tellurism or Animal Magnetism)
- Ferenc Kölcsey – Mohács
- Robert Morrison – A Parting Memorial, consisting of Miscellaneous Discources
- Abigail Mott – Biographical Sketches and Interesting Anecdotes of Persons of Color
- Josiah Priest – The Wonders of Nature
- Magdalena Dobromila Rettigová – Domácí kuchařka (A Household Cookery Book)
- Pavel Jozef Šafárik – Geschichte der slawischen Sprache und Literatur nach allen Mundarten (History of Slavic Language and Literature in All Vernaculars)
- Dovber Schneuri – Toras Chaim
- David Strauss, translated by George Eliot – The Life of Jesus, Critically Examined
- Francesco Vella – Trattat fuk l'Oblighi tal-Bniedem tal-Patri F. Soave (Treaty on the Duties of Man by Father F. Soave)

== Births ==
=== January–March ===
- January 3 – John White, English-born New Zealand historian and ethnographer (died 1891)
- January 5
  - Helen Louisa Bostwick Bird, American poet and journalist (died 1907)
  - Morten Eskesen, Danish folklorist and editor (died 1913)
- January 6 – Adolf Kirchhoff, German historian and philologist (died 1908)
- January 8
  - J. R. Black, Scottish journalist and publisher (died 1880)
  - Gabriele Dara, Italian and Albanian poet and journalist (died 1885)
- January 14 – Ivan Naumovich, Galician essayist and polemicist (died 1891)
- January 17
  - Adelaïde Ehrnrooth, Finnish novelist, poet and essayist (died 1905)
  - Wilhelm Lübke, German art historian (died 1893)
- January 19 – Gustav Hertzberg, German historian and translator (died 1907)
- January 20 – William Bonaparte-Wyse, Irish poet (died 1892)
- January 22 – Friedrich Ueberweg, German philosopher and historian (died 1871)
- January 23 – Edward Byles Cowell, English philologist and translator (died 1903)
- January 24
  - Ditmar Meidell, Norwegian journalist and editor (died 1900)
  - William Gifford Palgrave, English scholar and essayist (died 1888)
- January 27
  - Eliza Allen, American memoirist (year of death unknown)
  - (O.S.: January 15) – Mikhail Saltykov-Shchedrin, Russian satirist, novelist and editor (died 1889)
- February 3 – Walter Bagehot, English essayist and journalist (died 1877)
- February 6 – Charles Barbier de Meynard, French historian (died 1908)
- February 9
  - Samuel Bowles, American journalist and travel writer (died 1878)
  - József Borovnyák, Slovenian-Hungarian translator and Catholic theologian (died 1909)
- February 10 – Ernest de Bouteiller, French historian and politician (died 1883)
- February 12 – Prince George of Prussia, German general, poet and playwright (died 1902)
- February 14
  - George Kingsley, English travel writer, journalist and librarian (died 1892)
  - Ignacy Żagiell, Polish travel writer (died 1891)
- February 15 – Thomas Butler Gunn, English illustrator and journalist (died 1904)
- February 16 – Joseph Viktor von Scheffel, German poet and novelist (died 1886)
- February 19 – Matija Mesić, Croatian historian (died 1878)
- February 21 – Lois Waisbrooker, American essayist and publisher (died 1909)
- February 24 – Adolphe Bitard, French biographer and magazine editor (died 1888)
- February 26 – Oswald Ottendorfer, Moravian-born American journalist (died 1900)
- February 27
  - Cynthia Roberts Gorton, American poet and author (died 1894)
  - Manuel Antonio Matta, Chilean politician, journalist and editor (died 1892)
  - Samuel Timmins, English literary historian and librarian (died 1902)
  - Louise Westergaard, Danish journalist and translator (died 1880)
- February 28 – Pamfil Yurkevich, Ukrainian-Russian philosopher (died 1874)
- March 1 (O.S.: February 17) – Nicolae Popea, Romanian-Hungarian historian (died 1908)
- March 4
  - August Johann Gottfried Bielenstein, German-Russian philologist, historian and newspaper editor (died 1907)
  - Elme Marie Caro, French philosopher and journalist (died 1887)
- March 15 – Adolphe Joseph Carcassonne, French poet and playwright (died 1891)
- March 19 – Stanislas d'Escayrac de Lauture, French travel writer and linguist (died 1868)
- March 20
  - Ruggero Bonghi, Italian journalist, historian and polemicist (died 1895)
  - Carel Vosmaer, Dutch poet and art critic (died 1888)
- March 22 – Lewys Glyn Dyfi, Welsh-born American poet and journalist (died 1891)
- March 24 – Matilda Joslyn Gage, American journalist and editor (died 1898)
- March 27 – Johannes Overbeck, German historian (died 1895)

=== April–June ===
- c. April – Lady Strangford, English travel writer, editor and illustrator (died 1887)
- April 1
  - Paride Suzzara Verdi, Italian revolutionary and journalist (died 1879)
  - Lady Dorothy Nevill, English memoirist (died 1913)
- April 10
  - Mustafa Celalettin Pasha, Polish-born Ottoman soldier and essayist (died 1876)
  - Pamelia Sarah Vining, American-born Canadian poet and novelist (died 1897)
- April 17 – Vojtěch Náprstek, Czech journalist, lecturer and book collector (died 1894)
- April 19 – Franciszek Kostrzewski, Polish illustrator (died 1911)
- April 20 – Dinah Craik, née Mulock, English novelist and poet (died 1887)
- April 21 – William Hearn, Irish essayist and legal scholar (died 1888)
- April 26 – Eduardo Asquerino, Spanish journalist, poet and playwright (died 1881)
- April 28
  - William Brough, English playwright (died 1870)
  - Frances Irene Burge Griswold, American poet and short story writer (died 1900)
- April 29 – Alfred B. Meacham, American playwright, polemicist and historian (died 1882)
- April 30 – Julius von Ficker, Prussian-born Austrian historian (died 1902)
- May 9 – Gregorio Gutiérrez González, Colombian poet (died 1872)
- May 10 – Henrik Krohn, Norwegian poet, journalist and language reformer (died 1879)
- May 12 – Alexander Roberts, Scottish philologist and historian (died 1901)
- May 13 – Clara Andersen, Danish playwright and novelist (died 1895)
- May 15 – Henri Mouhot, French ethnographer and travel writer (died 1861)
- May 22
  - Denys Corbet, Guernsey poet (died 1909)
  - Kostandin Kristoforidhi, Ottoman-Albanian translator and essayist (died 1895)
  - Christopher Columbus Langdell, American legal scholar (died 1906)
- May 23
  - Adile Sultan, Ottoman poet (died 1899)
  - Frances Fuller Victor, American historian and novelist (died 1902)
- May 25 – Ralph T. H. Griffith, English philologist and translator (died 1906)
- May 26 – Edgar Alfred Bowring, English translator and essayist (died 1911)
- May 31 – Gustav Brühl, American poet and journalist (died 1903)
- June – Thomas Gardiner, Scottish-born American newspaper publisher (died 1899)
- June 1 – Kornélia Prielle, Hungarian actress (died 1906)
- June 2 – Richard Holt Hutton, English essayist and journalist (died 1897)
- June 5 – Nathaniel Bryceson, English clerk and diarist (died 1911)
- June 10 – Bogoboj Atanacković, Serbian-Hungarian novelist and critic (died 1858)
- June 15
  - Bill Arp, American humorist (died 1903)
  - Luigi Ferri, Italian philosopher (died 1895)
- June 18 – Cäsar Rüstow, German military writer (died 1866)
- June 21 – Angelo Zottoli, Italian translator and literary historian (died 1902)
- June 25 – Émile Acollas, French legal scholar (died 1891)
- June 26 – Adolf Bastian, German polymath (died 1905)
- June 29 – Charles Ernest Beulé, French historian (died 1874)

=== July–September ===
- July 1 – Hana Catherine Mullens, Bengali novelist and translator (died 1861)
- July 2 – Ernest Hamel, French poet, historian and journalist (died 1898)
- July 3 – Rudolf Westphal, German historian and philologist (died 1892)
- July 4 – John Morris, English historian and Catholic theologian (died 1893)
- Amédée Guillemin, French science writer and journalist (died 1893)
- July 8
  - Friedrich Chrysander, German music historian and critic (died 1901)
  - Laurindo Rabelo, Brazilian poet (died 1864)
- July 12 – William Kirkpatrick Riland Bedford, English historian (died 1905)
- July 15 – Emily C. Blackman, American historian and journalist (died 1907)
- July 20 – Laura Keene, English actress (died 1873)
- July 23 (O.S.: July 11) – Alexander Afanasyev, Russian journalist and folklorist (died 1871)
- July 30 – Herbert William Fisher, English historian (died 1903)
- August 5
  - Andreas Aagesen, Danish legal scholar (died 1879)
  - İbrahim Şinasi, Ottoman journalist and playwright (died 1871)
- August 7 – August Ahlqvist, Finnish poet and philologist (died 1889)
- August 12
  - Nikolai Albertini, Russian journalist (died 1890)
  - Henry Clay Brockmeyer, German-born American poet, novelist, playwright and philosopher (died 1906)
  - Lucy Ellen Guernsey, American novelist (died 1899)
- August 14 – Eusebio Lillo, Chilean poet and journalist (died 1910)
- August 28 – Mikhail Stasyulevich, Russian historian and publisher (died 1911)
- August 31 – Emma Bedelia Dunham, American poet (died 1910)
- September 1 – Herbert Haines, English historian and Anglican theologian (died 1872)
- September 4 – Karl Blind, German-born revolutionary, historian and essayist (died 1907)
- September 6 – Leopold Ullstein, German newspaper publisher (died 1899)
- September 7 – Rajnarayan Basu, Bengali journalist, historian and Brahmoist theologian (died 1899)
- September 8 – Addison Peale Russell, American essayist (died 1912)
- September 10 – Fernand Desnoyers, French poet, critic and folklorist (died 1869)
- September 13 – Leonard Kip, American novelist and travel writer (died 1906)
- September 14 – Ljubomir Nenadović, Serbian poet and historian (died 1895)
- September 17 – Jean-Baptiste-Éric Dorion, Canadian journalist (died 1866)

=== October–December ===
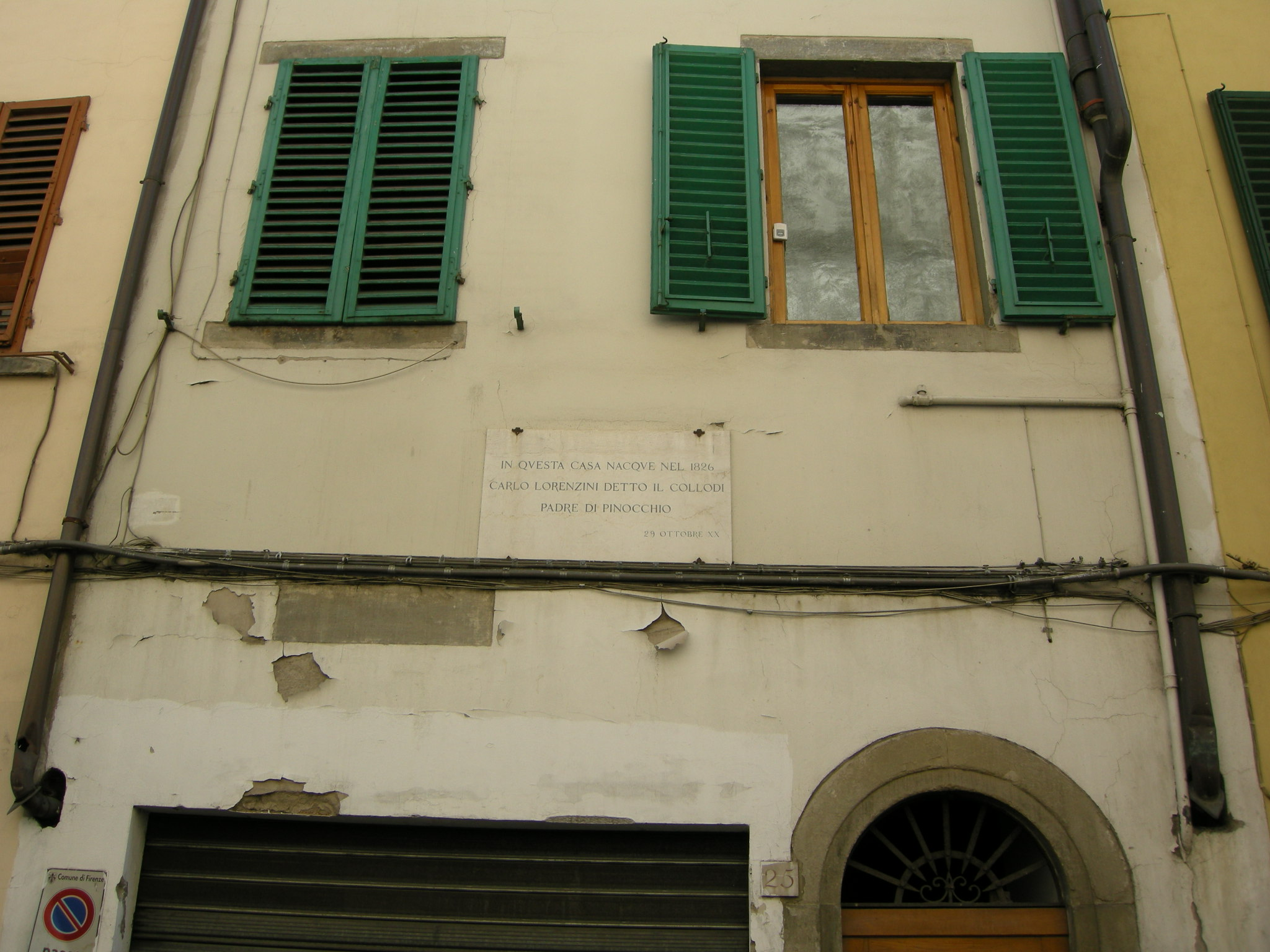
Carlo Collodi birthplace on Via Taddea, Florence

- October 8 – Luka Svetec, Slovene-Austrian poet and philologist (died 1921)
- October 9 – Agathon Meurman, Finnish journalist and lexicographer (died 1909)
- October 19
  - Manuel Joël, German historian, philosopher and Jewish theologian (died 1890)
  - Athénaïs Michelet, French science writer and memoirist (died 1899)
- October 22 – Pietro Amat di San Filippo, Italian historian (died 1895)
- October 23 – Charles-Honoré Laverdière, Canadian historian and editor (died 1873)
- October 25 – Frank Key Howard, American journalist and memoirist (died 1872)
- October 26 – Dimitri Bakradze, Georgian-Russian historian (died 1890)
- October 27 – Marie von Olfers, German short story writer and illustrator (died 1924)
- November – Emily Verdery Battey, American journalist (died 1912)
- November 2 – William Haines Lytle, American soldier and poet (died 1863)
- November 4
  - Charles Hamilton Aide, French-born English novelist, poet and playwright (died 1906)
  - Emmanuel Domenech, French travel writer, folklorist and historian (died 1903)
- November 8 – Gualtherus Johannes Cornelis Kolff, Dutch East Indian publisher (died 1881)
- November 12 – Alejandro Tapia y Rivera, Puerto Rican poet, playwright, essayist and literary historian (died 1882)
- November 13 – Jovan Đorđević, Serbian poet, playwright and editor (died 1900)
- November 14 – Heinrich Lang, German Reformed theologian and editor (died 1876)
- November 19 – Alfred Mézières, French journalist and historian (died 1915)
- c. November 23 – T. E. Kebbel, English journalist (died 1917)
- November 24
  - Carlo Collodi, Italian children's author, satirist and newspaper editor (died 1890)
  - Coates Kinney, American journalist and poet (died 1904)
- November 27
  - Robert Hugh Miller, American journalist and editor (died 1911)
  - António Augusto Soares de Passos, Portuguese poet (died 1860)
- December 6 – Albert Harrison Hoyt, English historian and editor (died 1915)
- December 10 – Franz Susemihl, German philologist and literary historian (died 1901)
- December 17 – Amédée de Jallais, French playwright and librettist (died 1909)
- December 18 – Alexandre Chatrian, French playwright and journalist (died 1890)
- December 22 – U. V. Koren, Norwegian-born American Lutheran theologian (died 1910)
- December 23 – William Blanchard Jerrold, English journalist and biographer (died 1884)
- December 26 – Valerian Kalinka, Polish historian and editor (died 1886)
- December 28
  - Conrad Busken Huet, Dutch pastor, journalist and literary critic (died 1886)
  - Vladimir Stoyunin, Russian essayist, literary historian and journalist (died 1888)
- December 30 – Philippe Baby Casgrain, Canadian historian (died 1917)

=== Unknown dates ===
- David ben Shimon, Moroccan Jewish theologian (died 1879)
- Thomas Chenery, Barbadian-born English scholar and editor (died 1884)
- Wali Dewane, Kurdish-Ottoman poet (died 1881)
- Liautaud Ethéart, Haitian playwright and essayist (died 1888)
- Henry George Keene, English and Indian historian (died 1915)
- Mary Eva Kelly, Irish-born Australian poet (died 1910)
- Manol Lazarov, Bulgarian essayist and poet (died 1881)
- Bedros Magakyan, Ottoman-Armenian actor and theater director (died 1891)
- Frank Marryat, English memoirist and travel writer (died 1855)
- Augustus Mayhew, English journalist, humorist and theatrical producer (died 1875)
- Mishkín-Qalam, Persian calligrapher and Bahá'í mystic (died 1912)
- Tasos Neroutsos, Greek-born historian and language reformer (died 1892)
- John Sands, Scottish journalist, humorist and travel writer (died 1900)
- M. A. Sherring, English ethnologist and historian (died 1880)
- Eliza Sproat Turner, American journalist and publisher (died 1903)
- Fyodor Stellovsky, Russian publisher and editor (died 1875)
- Adèle Toussaint-Samson, French travel writer (died 1911)
- Probable year of birth – Selim Aga, Sudanese-Liberian autobiographer and poet (died 1875)

== Deaths ==
=== January–June ===
- c. January – Alecu Beldiman, Moldavian poet-chronicler and translator (born 1760)
- January 3 – Nikolay Rumyantsev, Russian politician and scholar (born 1754)
- January 5 – William C. Somerville, American diplomat and historian (born 1790)
- January 6 – John Farey Sr., English polymath (born 1766)
- January 16 – John Rudolph Sutermeister, Curaçao-born American poet (born 1803)
- January 20 – Stanisław Staszic, Polish polymath (stroke, born 1755)
- January 24 – Yousab El Abah, Egyptian Coptic theologian (born 1735)
- January 31 – Étienne-François de Lantier, French poet and playwright (born 1734)
- February 17 – Johann Philipp Gabler, German Protestant theologian (born 1753)
- February 3 – Joseph Servières, French playwright (born 1781)
- February 20 – Avram Mrazović, Serbian-Austrian translator and textbook writer (born 1756)
- March 5 – Charles Paul Landon, French painter and art historian (born 1760)
- March 16 – Johann Severin Vater, German theologian and philologist (born 1771)
- March 24 – Georg Nikolaus von Nissen, Danish music historian and biographer (born 1761)
- March 29 – Johann Heinrich Voss, German poet and translator (born 1751)
- April 3 – Reginald Heber, English poet, bishop and travel writer (born 1783)
- April 13 – Pierre-François-Joseph Robert, French journalist, jurist and politician (born 1763)
- April 20 – Waller Rodwell Wright, English diplomat and poet (born 1775)
- April 25 – William Smith Shaw, American librarian (born 1778)
- April 27
  - Elazar Fleckeles, Moravian Jewish Orthodox theologian (born 1754)
  - Charles Symmons, Welsh poet, playwright and Anglican theologian (born 1749)
- May 2 – Antoni Malczewski, Polish poet (born 1793)
- May 17 – August Adolph von Hennings, German and Danish essayist and historian (born 1746)
- May 19 – Jean Skipwith, American book collector (born c. 1747)
- June 3
  - (O.S.: May 22) – Nikolay Karamzin, Russian poet and historian (born 1766)
  - William Hamilton Reid, English poet, editor and polemicist (year of birth unknown)
- June 9
  - Johann Kaspar Friedrich Manso, German historian and philologist (born 1760)
  - Jedidiah Morse, American geographer and textbook writer (born 1761)
- June 19 – Elsa Fougt, Swedish editor and publisher (born 1744)
- June 26 – Johanna Elisabeth Swaving, Dutch newspaper editor, publisher and actress (born 1754)
- June 23 – John Taylor, English poet and songwriter (born 1750)
- June 27
  - Shaykh Ahmad, Arab Shia theologian (born 1753)
  - Mary Leadbeater, Irish poet and diarist (born 1758)

=== July–December ===
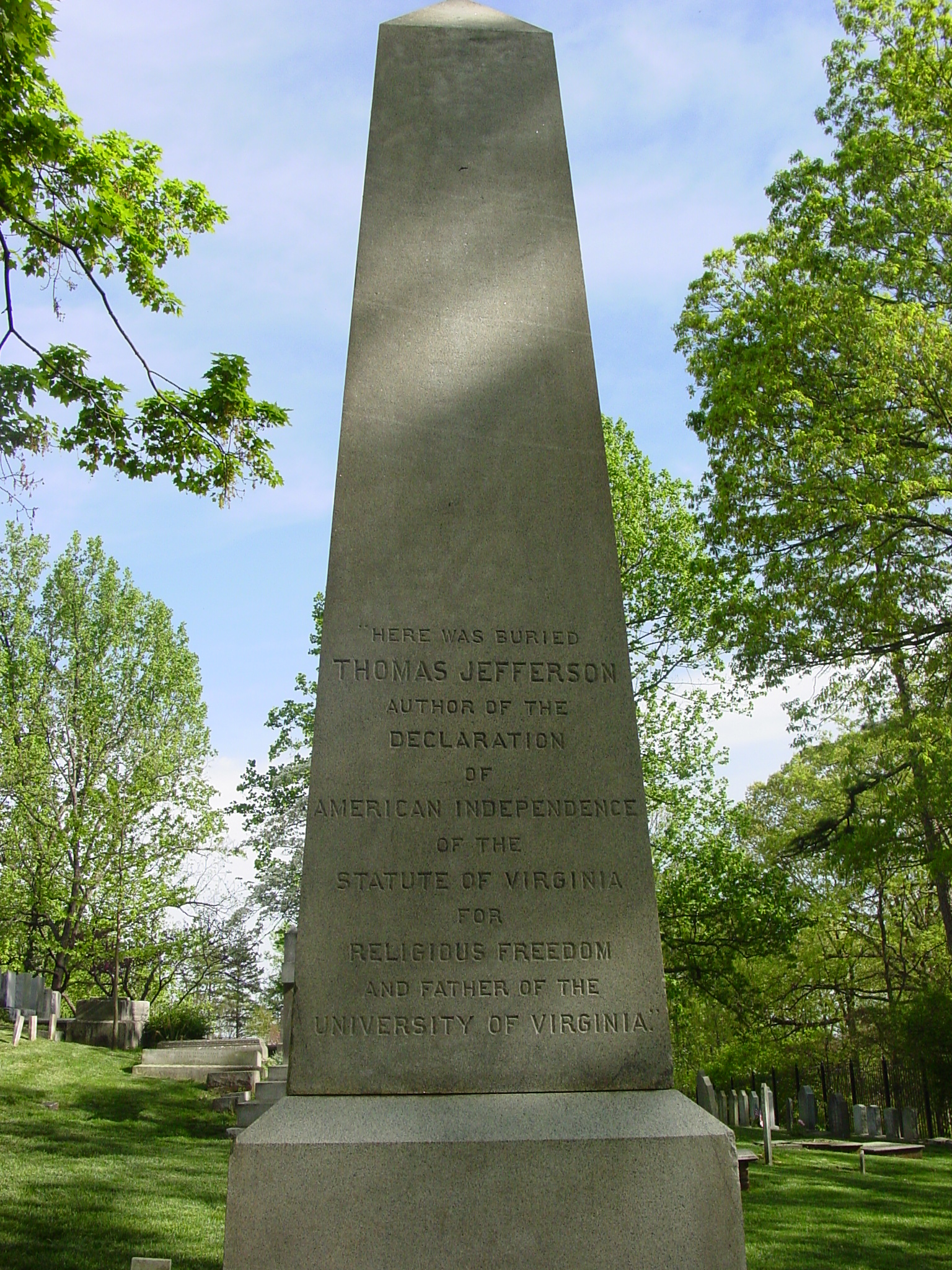
Grave of Thomas Jefferson, at Monticello

- July 4 – Thomas Jefferson, American philosopher and politician (born 1743)
- July 5
  - Stamford Raffles, British colonial administrator and historian (stroke, born 1781)
  - Karl Friedrich Stäudlin, German Protestant theologian (born 1761)
  - Jane Watts, Scottish painter and travel writer (born 1793)
- July 20 – Gamaliel Smethurst, Nova Scotian memoirist (born 1738)
- July 25 (O.S.: July 13) – Kondraty Ryleyev, Russian poet and revolutionary (hanged, born 1795)
- August 10
  - Vasily Lyovshin, Russian novelist and essayist (born 1746)
  - August Schumann, German bookseller and publisher (born 1773)
- August 26 – Royall Tyler, American playwright, poet and essayist (cancer, born 1757)
- August 31 – John Raithby, English legal scholar and editor (born 1766)
- September 22 – Johann Peter Hebel, German short story writer and poet (born 1760)
- Before October – Elizabeth Meeke, English popular novelist (born 1761)
- October 3
  - Jens Baggesen, Danish poet and satirist (born 1764)
  - Stanisław Bohusz Siestrzeńcewicz, Belarusian Catholic bishop and historian (born 1731)
- October 9 (bur.) – John Williams, Welsh schoolmaster and manuscript collector (born 1760)
- October 19 – François-Joseph Talma, French actor (born 1763)
- November 1 – William Barnes Rhodes, English poet, translator and book collector (born 1772)
- November 26 – John Nichols, English antiquary and printer (born 1745)
- December – William Glen, Scottish poet (born 1789)
- December 16 – Siegfried August Mahlmann, German poet and editor (born 1771)
- December 18 – Iolo Morganwg, Welsh poet and literary forger (born 1747)
- December 22
  - John Haywood, American historian (born 1762)
  - Michael Massey Robinson, Australian poet (born 1744)
- December 28 – Schack von Staffeldt, Danish poet (born 1769)
- December 31 – William Gifford, English satirist and editor (born 1756)

=== Unknown dates ===
- Jacob ben Abraham Kahana, Lithuanian Jewish theologian (year of birth unknown)
- Menachem Mendel Lefin, Podolian Jewish theologian, translator and essayist (born 1749)
- Caroline Lewenhaupt, Swedish courtier and poet (born 1754)
- Mustafa Râkim, Ottoman calligrapher (born 1757)
- Léonard Tousez, French actor and playwright (born 1788)
