= 1872 in literature =

This article contains information about the literary events and publications of 1872.

== Events ==
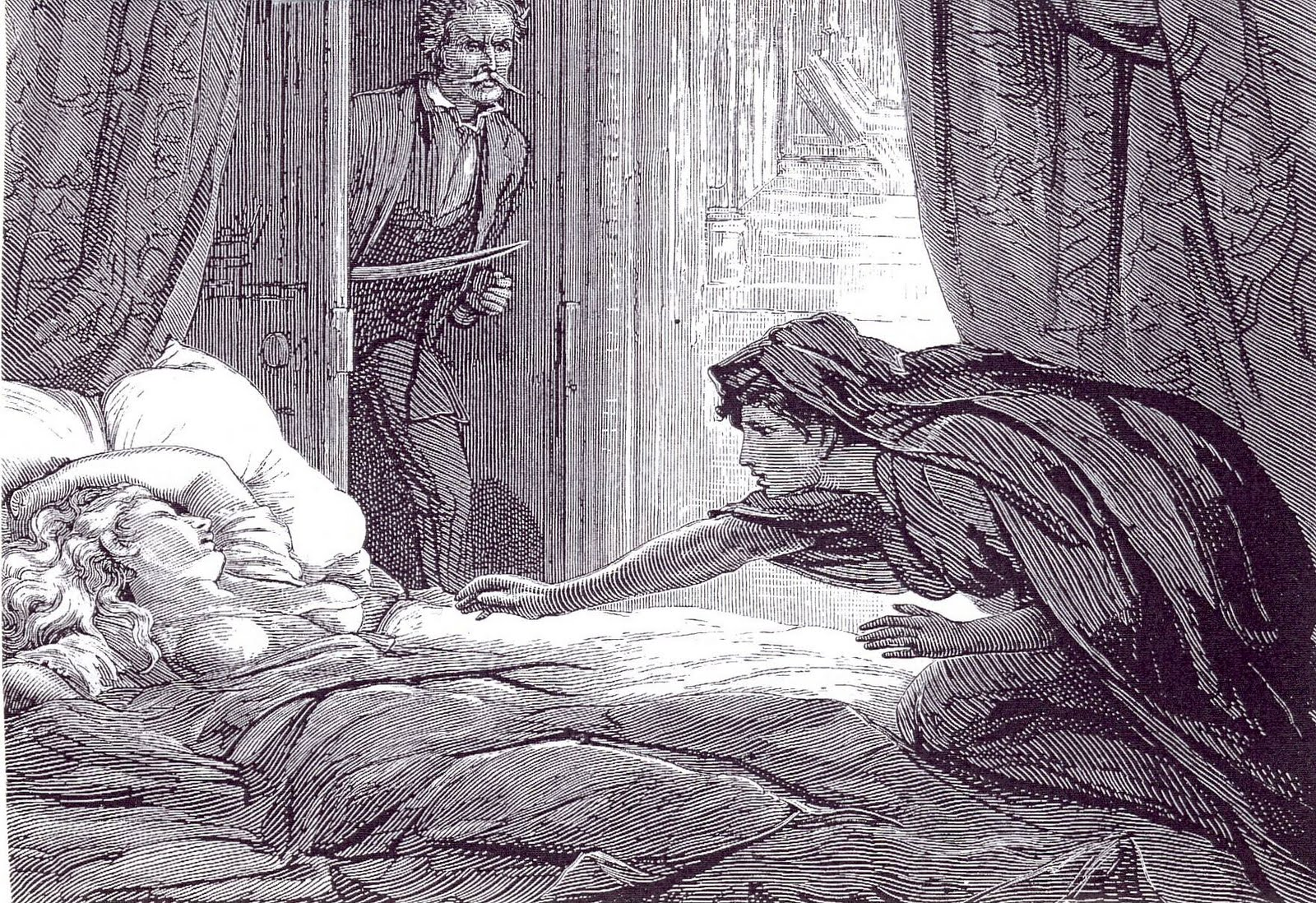
Illustration to Carmilla by D. H. Friston (The Dark Blue, 1872)

- March
  - The Federation of Madrid expels Paul Lafargue and all other signatories to an ostensibly subversive article in La Emancipación.
  - Serialisation of Sheridan Le Fanu's Gothic vampire novella Carmilla ends in the monthly The Dark Blue. Later this year it appears in his collection In a Glass Darkly. Set in the Duchy of Styria, it helps to introduce the lesbian vampire genre.
- June 15 – Thomas Hardy's second novel (and the first set in Wessex), Under the Greenwood Tree, is published in London (as "by the author of Desperate Remedies").
- June 19 – The Bibliothèque nationale et universitaire is founded in Strasbourg as the Kaiserliche Universitäts- und Landesbibliothek zu Straßburg, a public regional and academic library for the new German territory of Alsace-Lorraine (Reichsland Elsass-Lothringen) after destruction of its predecessors in the Siege of Strasbourg in the Franco-Prussian War.
- July – Rose la Touche rejects a proposal from John Ruskin for the last time.
- July 7 – Paul Verlaine abandons his family for London with Arthur Rimbaud.
- September 13 (O. S.: September 1) – Romanian poet Mihai Eminescu first attends the literary club Junimea of Iași and reads out his fantasy story Poor Dionis (Sărmanul Dionis). It is poorly received by the Junimists.
- September 30 – George MacDonald arrives in Boston for a lecture tour of the United States.
- November (approximate date) – Lafcadio Hearn becomes a reporter on the Cincinnati Daily Enquirer.
- December 3 – Assyriologist George Smith presents the first translation of the Epic of Gilgamesh to a meeting of the Society of Biblical Archaeology in London.
- December 22 – Jules Verne's novel Around the World in Eighty Days (Le Tour du monde en quatre-vingts jours) finishes serialisation (since November 2) in the daily Le Temps, the day after the concluding date of the narrative.
- unknown dates
  - Benito Pérez Galdós begins Trafalgar, the first in the series of historical novels known as Episodios Nacionales.
  - The first university course in American Literature is held at Princeton University by John Seely Hart.
  - The Scottish Gaelic magazine Féillire first appears as Almanac Gàilig air son 1872 in Inverness.

== New books ==
=== Fiction ===
- William Harrison Ainsworth – Boscobel
- Machado de Assis – Ressurreição
- Mary Elizabeth Braddon – To the Bitter End
- Rhoda Broughton
  - Good-bye, Sweetheart!
  - Poor Pretty Bobby
- Samuel Butler – Erewhon
- Edward Bulwer-Lytton – The Parisians
- Wilkie Collins – Poor Miss Finch
- Annie Hall Cudlip – A Passion in Tatters
- Alphonse Daudet – Tartarin de Tarascon
- Fyodor Dostoevsky – Demons (Бесы, Bésy)
- Alexandre Dumas, père – Création et rédemption
- George Eliot – Middlemarch (serial publication concluded)
- Mihai Eminescu – Poor Dionis (Sărmanul Dionis)
- Thomas Hardy – Under the Greenwood Tree
- Mór Jókai
  - Eppur si muove – És mégis mozog a Föld (And yet the Earth moves)
  - The Man with the Golden Touch (Az arany ember)
- Sheridan Le Fanu
  - In a Glass Darkly
  - Willing to Die
- Nikolai Leskov – The Cathedral Folk (Соборяне, Soboryane)
- Eliza Lynn Linton – The True History of Joshua Davidson, Christian and Communist
- Margaret Oliphant – At His Gates
- Bayard Taylor – Beauty and The Beast, and Tales of Home
- Anthony Trollope – The Golden Lion of Granpere
- Jules Verne
  - The Adventures of Three Englishmen and Three Russians in South Africa (Aventures de trois Russes et de trois Anglais dans l'Afrique australe)
  - "Dr. Ox's Experiment"
  - The Fur Country (Le Pays des fourrures)
- Émile Zola – La Curée

=== Children and young adults ===
- R. D. Blackmore – The Maid of Sker
- Frances Freeling Broderip – Tiny Tadpoles, and Other Tales
- Lewis Carroll – Through the Looking-Glass and What Alice Found There
- Juliana Horatia Ewing – A Flat Iron for a Farthing
- George MacDonald – The Princess and the Goblin
- E. J. Richmond – The Jewelled Serpent
- Susan Coolidge – What Katy Did (first in the What Katy Did series of five books)
- Ouida – A Dog of Flanders

=== Drama ===
- François Coppée – Les Bijoux de la Délivrance
- Franz Grillparzer – The Jewess of Toledo (Die Jüdin von Toledo, first performed posthumously, written 1851)
- Prosper Mérimée – La Chambre bleue (published posthumously)
- August Strindberg – Master Olof
- Ivan Turgenev – A Month in the Country («Месяц в деревне», Mesiats v derevne, first performed)

=== Poetry ===
- José Hernández Athénaïs Michelet Martín Fierro (first part)

=== Non-fiction ===
- William Henry Davenport Adams, Hector Giacomelli, Athénaïs Michelet – Nature; or the Poetry of Earth and Sea
- Chambers's English Dictionary
- William Cullen Bryant – Picturesque America, vol. 1
- John Evans – The Ancient Stone Implements, Weapons and Ornaments of Great Britain
- Warren Felt Evans – Mental Medicine
- Sophia Jex-Blake – Medical Women: A Thesis and a History
- Friedrich Nietzsche – The Birth of Tragedy (Die Geburt der Tragödie aus dem Geiste der Musik)
- Alexandru Papadopol-Calimah – Scrieri vechi perdute atingetóre de Dacia (Old Lost Writings Relating to Dacia; first installments)
- Charles Busbridge Snepp – Songs of Grace and Glory
- Mark Twain – "Roughing It"
- Henry Wilson – History of the Rise and Fall of the Slave Power in America, vols. 1 & 2

== Births ==
- January 31 – Zane Grey, American Western novelist (died 1939)
- March 31 – Mary Lewis Langworthy, American pageant writer (died 1949)
- April 4
  - Alexandru Tzigara-Samurcaș – Romanian art historian, ethnographer and journalist (died 1952)
  - Frida Uhl – Austrian writer (died 1943)
- May 2 – Ichiyō Higuchi, Japanese writer (died 1896)
- May 21 (May 9 O.S.) – Teffi, born Nadezhda Alexandrovna Lokhvitskaya, Russian-born humorist (died 1952)
- May 31 – W. Heath Robinson, English cartoonist and illustrator (died 1944)
- June 27 – Paul Laurence Dunbar, African American poet, novelist and playwright (died 1906)
- August 24 – Max Beerbohm, English essayist and parodist (died 1956)
- September 15 – Frances Garnet Wolseley, English horticulturist and garden writer (died 1936)
- September 22 – Eleanor Hallowell Abbott, American fiction writer and poet (died 1958)
- October 8 – John Cowper Powys, Anglo-Welsh novelist (died 1963)
- October 10 – Arthur Talmage Abernethy, American theologian and poet (died 1956)
- October 18 (October 6 O.S.) – Mikhail Kuzmin, Russian poet, novelist and composer (died 1936)
- October 20 – F. M. Mayor, English novelist (died 1932)
- November 23 – Eraclie Sterian, Romanian science writer and playwright (died 1948)
- December 28 – Pío Baroja, Spanish novelist (died 1956)

== Deaths ==
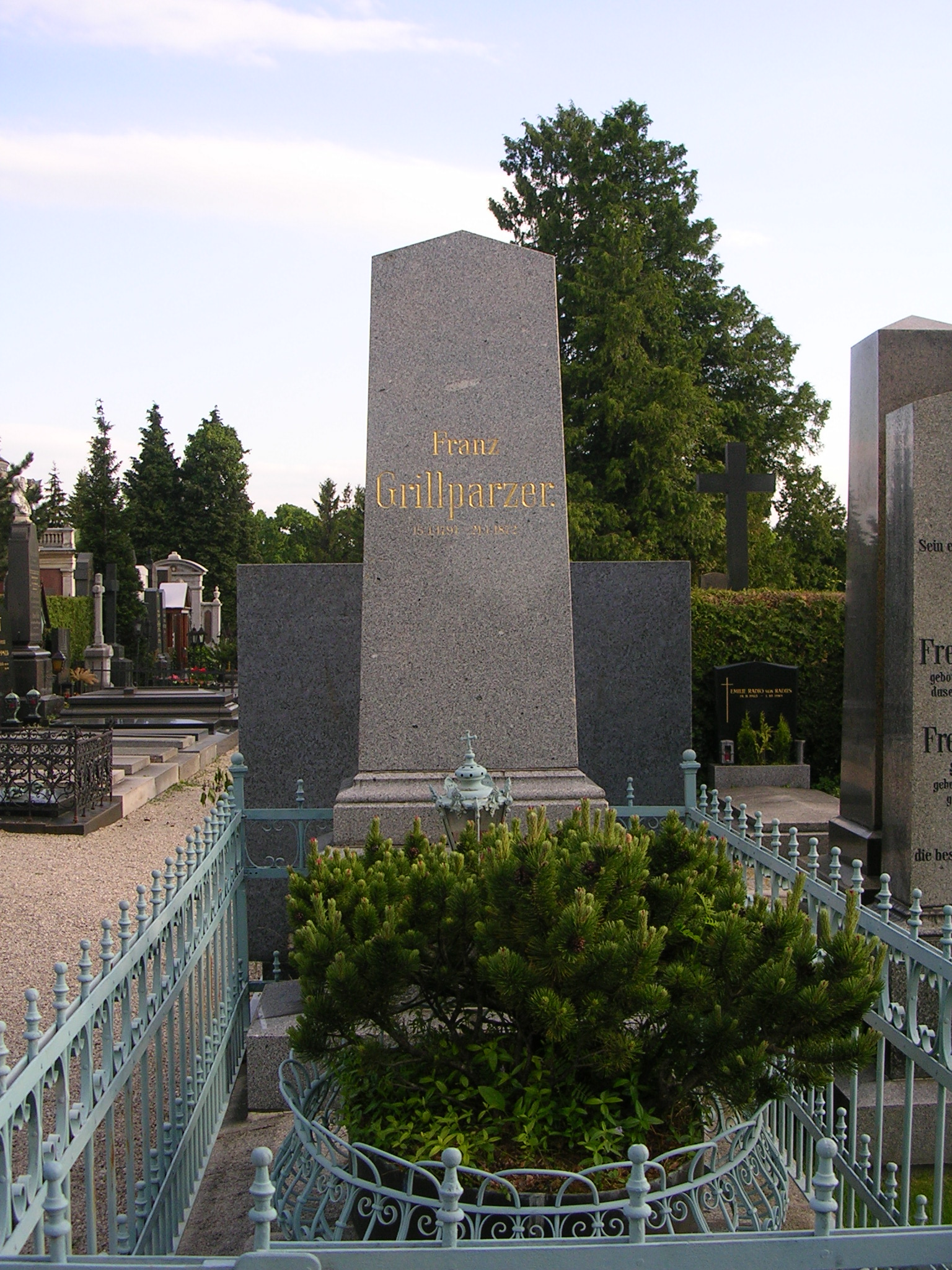
Franz Grillparzer's tomb

- January 21 – Franz Grillparzer, Austrian poet and dramatist (born 1791)
- February 6 – Sir Thomas Phillipps, English book collector (born 1792)
- March 4 – Carsten Hauch, Danish poet (born 1790)
- March 10 – Giuseppe Mazzini, Italian philosopher, journalist and politician (born 1805)
- March 11 – Emily Taylor, English author, poet and hymn writer (born 1795)
- April 1 – Frederick Denison Maurice, English theologian (born 1805)
- April 13 – Samuel Bamford, English essayist and poet (born 1788)
- April 20 – Ljudevit Gaj, Croatian linguist and journalist (born 1809)
- May 13 – Moritz Hartmann, German poet (born 1821)
- May 29 – Frank Key Howard, American journalist and memoirist (born 1826)
- June 1 – Charles Lever, Irish novelist (born 1806)
- July 25 – Gregorio Gutiérrez González, Colombian poet (born 1826)
- August 8 – Heinrich Abeken, German theologian (born 1809)
- September 11 – Countess Dash, French writer (born 1804)
- September 18 – Herbert Haines, English historian and Anglican theologian (born 1826)
- September 22 – Vladimir Dal, Russian lexicographer (born 1801)
- October 10 – Fanny Fern, American journalist, novelist and children's writer (born 1811)
- October 21 – Jean-Henri Merle d'Aubigné, Swiss historian (born 1794)
- November 16 – William Gilham, American military writer (born 1818)
- December 23 – Théophile Gautier, French poet and novelist (born 1811)
