= Gottfried Christian Friedrich Lücke =

German theologian (1791-1855)

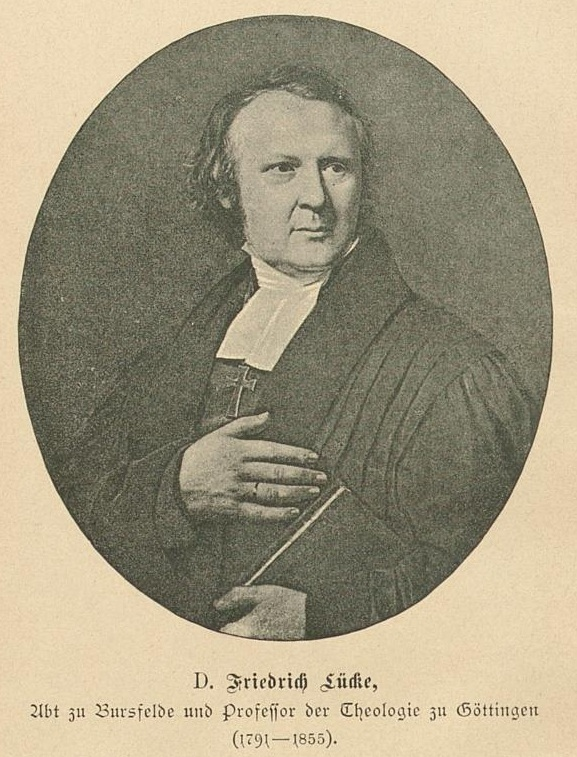
Gottfried Christian Friedrich Lücke

Gottfried Christian Friedrich Lücke (24 August 1791 – 4 February 1855) was a German Protestant theologian.

== Biography ==
Lücke was born at Egeln near Magdeburg, where his father was a merchant. He studied theology at Halle and Göttingen. In 1814 he received the degree of doctor in philosophy from Halle; in 1816 he moved to the University of Berlin, where he became licentiate in theology, and qualified as Privatdozent.

He soon became friendly with Friedrich Schleiermacher and Wilhelm Martin Leberecht de Wette, and was associated with them in 1819 in the redaction of the Theologische Zeitschrift. Meanwhile, his lectures and publications (among the latter a Grundriss der Neutestamentlichen Hermeneutik, 1817) had brought him into considerable repute, and he was appointed professor extraordinarius at the new University of Bonn in the spring of 1818; in the following autumn he became professor ordinarius. From Bonn, where he had JCW Augusti (1772–1841), JKL Gieseler, and Karl Immanuel Nitzsch for colleagues, he was called in 1827 to Göttingen to succeed Karl Friedrich Stäudlin (1761-1826). In that year he helped to found the Theologische Studien und Kritiken, the chief organ of the "mediation" theology (Vermittelungstheologie). At Göttingen he remained, declining all further calls elsewhere, as to Erlangen, Kiel, Halle, Tübingen, Jena and Leipzig, until his death.

Lücke, who was one of the most learned, multilateral and influential of the so-called "mediation" school of theology (Vermittlungstheologie), is now chiefly known by his Commentar über die Schriften des Evangelisten Johannes (4 vols., 1820–1832). He is an intelligent maintainer of the Johannine authorship of the Fourth Gospel; in connection with this thesis he was one of the first to argue for the early date and non-apostolic authorship of the Apocalypse. His Einleitung in die Offenbarung Johannes was published in 1832. He also published a Synopsis evangeliorum Matthaei, Marci et Lucae cum parallelis Joannis pericopis, jointly with de Wette (1818).
