= Gott segne Sachsenland =

National athem of the former Saxon Kingdom

English: God save Saxony
- State flag of Saxony
- National anthem of Saxony (kingdom) and unofficial anthem of Saxony (state)
- Lyrics: Siegfried August Mahlmann
- Music: Unknown, uses the tune from God Save the King

Audio sample
- Gott segne Sachsenland: file; help

"Gott segne Sachsenland" (lit: God bless Saxony) was the national anthem of the former Kingdom of Saxony and now an unofficial anthem of the German State of Saxony which is tailored to the popular Saxon monarch, Friedrich Augustus I. The lyrics were written in 1815 by Siegfried August Mahlmann.

== Lyrics ==
I: Gott segne Sachsenland, wo fest die Treue stand in Sturm und Nacht! Ew’ge Gerechtigkeit, hoch überm Meer der Zeit, die jedem Sturm gebeut, schütz uns mit Macht!
II: Blühe, du Rautenkranz in schöner Tage Glanz freudig empor! Heil, Friedrich August, Dir, heil, guter König, Dir. Dir, Vater, preisen wir liebend im Chor!	Variant 1 Blühe, du Rautenkranz in schöner Tage Glanz freudig empor! Heil, frommer Vater, Dir, heil, guter Mutter, Dir. Euch, teure segnen wir liebend im Chor!	Variant 2 Blühe, du Rautenkranz in schöner Tage Glanz freudig empor! Heil, Landesvater, Dir, Heil Landesmutter, Dir, Euch beide segnen wir liebend im Chor!
III: Was treue Herzen flehn, steigt zu des Himmels Höh’n aus Nacht zum Licht. Der uns’re Liebe sah, der uns’re Tränen sah, er ist uns hilfreich nah, verlässt uns nicht.
IV: Same as the first stanza.
