= Johann Karl Ludwig Gieseler =

German church historian (1792 – 1854)

Johann Karl Ludwig Gieseler, KH (3 March 1792 – 8 July 1854) was a Protestant German church historian.

== Biography ==
He was born at Petershagen, near Minden, where his father, Georg Christof Friedrich, was preacher. In his tenth year he entered the orphanage at Halle, from which he duly passed to the university, his studies being interrupted in October 1813 by a period of military service, during which he was enrolled as a volunteer in a regiment of chasseurs. On the conclusion of peace (1815) he returned to Halle, and, having in 1817 taken his degree in philosophy, he became assistant head (Conrector) of the Minden gymnasium, and in 1818 was appointed director of the gymnasium at Cleves.

Here he published his earliest work (Historisch-kritischer Versuch über die Entstehung u. die frühesten Schicksale der schriftlichen Evangelien), a treatise which had considerable influence on subsequent investigations as to the origin of the gospels. In 1819 Gieseler was appointed a professor ordinarius in theology in the newly founded University of Bonn, where, besides lecturing on church history, he made important contributions to the literature of that subject in Ernst Friedrich Karl Rosenmüller's Repertorium, KF Stäudlin and HG Tschirner's Archiv, and in various university "programs."

The first part of the first volume of his well-known Church History appeared in 1824. In 1831 he accepted a call to Göttingen as successor to GJ Planck. He lectured on church history, the history of dogma, and dogmatic theology. In 1837 he was appointed a Consistorialrath, and shortly afterwards was created a knight of the Royal Guelphic Order. The fifth volume of the Kirchengeschichte, embracing the period subsequent to 1814, and Dogmengeschichte, sometimes regarded as a sixth volume of the Church History, were published posthumously in 1855 by ER Redepenning (1810–1883), followed finally by the fourth in 1857. Less vivid and picturesque in style than Karl Hase, lacking August Neander's deep and sympathetic insight into the more spiritual forces by which church life is pervaded, he excels these and all other contemporaries in the fulness and accuracy of his information. His Lehrbuch der Kirchengeschichte, with its copious references to original authorities, is of great value to the student: "Gieseler wished that each age should speak for itself, since only by this means can the peculiarity of its ideas be fully appreciated." (Otto Pfleiderer, Development of Theology, p. 284).

== Works ==
- Historisch-kritischer Versuch über die Entstehung und die frühesten Schicksale der schriftlichen Evangelien, Leipzig 1818

(full text here)

- Ueber die Nazaräer und Ebioniten, in Archiv für alte und neue Kirchengeschichte vol. IV part II, Leipzig 1819
- Etwas über den Reichstag zu Augsburg im Jahre 1530, Hamm 1821
- Lehrbuch der Kirchengeschichte vol. I-III, Bonn 1824–35, vol. V, VI 1855, vol. IV 1857 (English: Text-Book of Ecclesiastical History, vol. I-III, Philadelphia 1836. New translation: A Compendium of Ecclesiastical History, vol. I-III, Edinburgh 1848. Revised translation: A Text-Book of Church History, vol. I-III, New York 1857–58, vol. IV 1862, vol. V 1880)
