= 1756 in literature =

This article contains information about the literary events and publications of 1756.

== Events ==
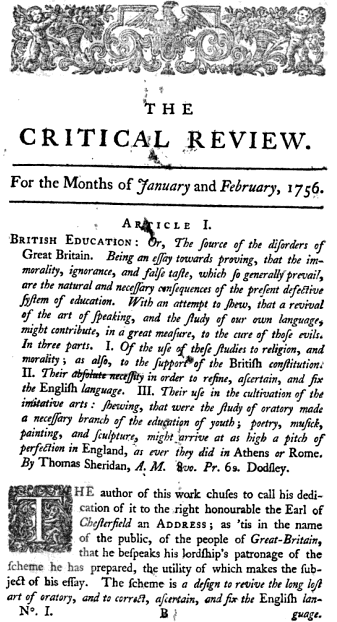
The Critical Review, no. 1, 1756

- March 1 – The first issue of The Critical Review is published, with Tobias Smollett as editor.
- April–May – Beginning of the Seven Years' War in Europe.
- June 20 – The Black Hole of Calcutta incident inspires renewed British efforts in India.
- October 29 – Frances Abington first acts with the company of the Theatre Royal, Drury Lane, London.
- November – Gilbert White becomes curate at his birthplace of Selborne in Hampshire, England, for the second time.
- December 14 – Rev. John Home's blank verse tragedy Douglas is performed for the first time, in Edinburgh, with considerable success, in spite of the opposition of the local church presbytery, who summon Rev. Alexander Carlyle to answer for having attended its representation. However, it fails in its early promise to set up a new Scottish dramatic tradition.

== New books ==
=== Fiction ===
- Anonymous – The Life and Memoirs of Mr. Ephraim Tristram Bates
- Thomas Amory – Life of John Buncle
- Jeanne-Marie Leprince de Beaumont – "La Belle et la Bête" ("Beauty and the Beast", abridged version, in Magasin des enfants, ou dialogues entre une sage gouvernante et plusieurs de ses élèves)
- Charlotte Lennox – The Memoirs of the Countess of Berci
- Samuel Richardson (anonymously) – The Paths of Virtue Delineated, children's versions of Pamela, Clarissa, and Sir Charles Grandison

=== Poetry ===
- Isaac Bickerstaffe – Leucothoe
- Richard Owen Cambridge – An Elegy Written in an Empty Assembly Room (parody of Pope's Eloisa to Abelard)
- Thomas Cole – The Arbour
- William Kenrick – Epistles to Lorenzo
- William Mason – Odes
- Christopher Pitt – Poems
- Christopher Smart
  - Hymn to the Supreme Being
  - The Works of Horace

=== Drama ===
- Frances Brooke – Virginia
- John Brown – Athelstane
- Samuel Foote
  - The Englishman Return'd from Paris
  - The Green-Room Squabble or a Battle Royal between the Queen of Babylon and the Daughter of Darius
- David Garrick
  - Catherine and Petruchio
  - The Tempest (opera)
- Carlo Goldoni – Il campiello
- John Home – Douglas

=== Non-fiction ===
- Corporate authorship – The Literary Magazine (periodical to 1758)
- Thomas Birch – The History of the Royal Society of London vol. i
- William Blackstone – An Analysis of the Laws of England
- Edmund Burke – A Vindication of Natural Society
- Alban Butler – The Lives of the Fathers, Martyrs, and Other Principal Saints (frequently abridged and reprinted)
- Theophilus Cibber – Dissertations on Theatrical Subjects
- Daniel Fenning – The Universal Spelling Book, or, A New and Easy Guide to the English Language
- José Francisco de Isla – Triunfo del amor y de la lealtad o Día Grande de Navarra
- Johann Matthias Gesner – Primæ lineæ isagoges in eruditionem universalem
- James Grieve – translation of A. Cornelius Celsus of Medicine
- Eliza Haywood
  - as "Mira" – The Wife
  - posthumously – The Husband: in Answer to The Wife
- David Hume – The History of Great Britain vol. ii
- Leopold Mozart – Versuch einer gründlichen Violinschule
- Alexander Russell – The Natural History of Aleppo
- Tobias Smollett
  - A Compendium of Authentic and Entertaining Voyages
  - (et al.) The Critical Review (periodical to 1790)
- Voltaire – Essai sur les mœurs et l'esprit des nations
- Joseph Warton – An Essay on the Writings and Genius of Pope
- John Wesley – An Address to the Clergy

== Births ==
- March 3 – William Godwin, English writer (died 1836)
- April – William Gifford, English satirist (died 1826)
- June 13 – Edmund Lodge, English biographer and writer on heraldry (died 1839)
- July 13 – Thomas Rowlandson, English caricaturist (died 1827)
- July 25 (probable year) – Elizabeth Hamilton, Irish-born Scottish essayist, poet and novelist (died 1816)
- September 15 – Karl Philipp Moritz (C. P. Moritz), German essayist and travel writer (died 1793)
- November 2 – Pierre Laromiguière, French philosopher (died 1837)
- November 18 – Thomas Burgess, English philosopher and bishop (died 1837)

== Deaths ==
- February 25 – Eliza Haywood, English writer and actress (born 1693)
- March 26 – Gilbert West, English poet (born 1703)
- March 30 to April 2 – Stephen Duck, English poet (suicide, born c. 1705)
- June 4 – Benjamin Elbel, German theologian (born 1690)
- December 29 – Thomas Cooke, English translator, dramatist and critic (born 1703)
