= Ernest Hamel =

French lawyer, poet, historian, journalist and politician

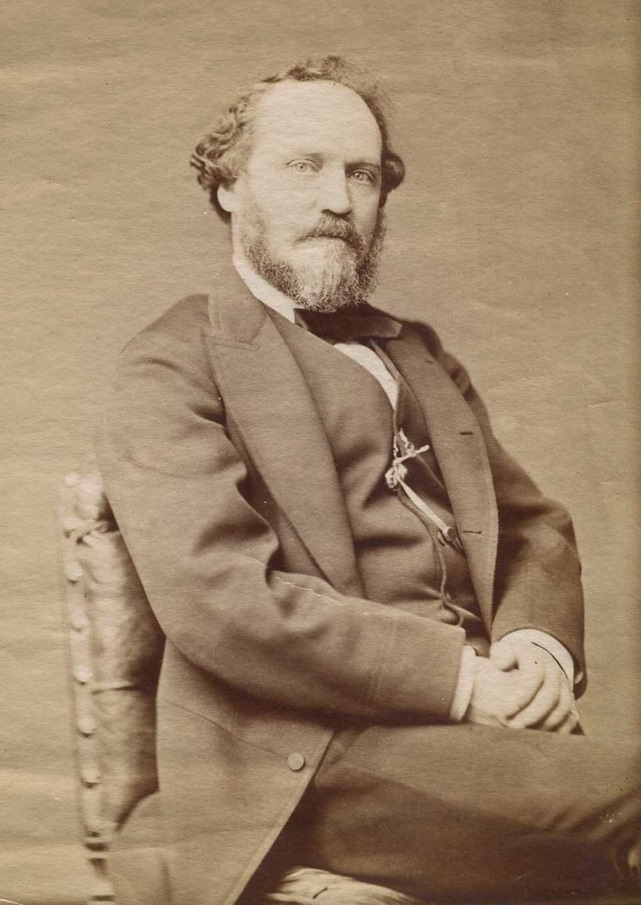
- Born: 2 July 1826; Paris, France
- Died: 6 January 1898 (aged 71); Paris, France
- Resting place: Père Lachaise Cemetery
- Education: Lycée Henri-IV; University of Paris
- Occupations: Lawyer, poet, historian, journalist, politician
- Spouse: Mathilde Huber
- Children: 1 son, 1 daughter
- Relatives: Charles François Lhomond (great-uncle)

Ernest Hamel (1826-1898) was a French lawyer, poet, historian, journalist and politician. He served as a member of the French Senate from 1892 to 1898, representing Seine-et-Oise.

== Early life ==
Ernest Hamel was born on 2 July 1826 in Paris, France. His great-uncle, Charles François Lhomond, was a grammarian.

Hamel was educated at the Lycée Henri-IV from 1835 to 1845. He studied the Law at the University of Paris from 1845 to 1848.

== Career ==
Hamel published two books about French institutions in 1848-1849. In 1851, he published a collection of poems, Les derniers chants. He subsequently published history books. He also wrote biographies. He served as the president of the Société des Gens de Lettres.

Hamel served as a member of the Francs-tireurs as well as the National Guard during the Franco-Prussian War of 1870-1871. Shortly after the war, Hamel embarked upon a career in journalism, writing for Le Courrier du dimanche, L'Opinion nationale, Le Siècle, La Presse libre, La Réforme, La Revue contemporaine, etc.

Hamel ran for the National Assembly in 1871 and 1876, but he lost both elections. He served as a councillor of the 12th arrondissement of Paris from 1878 to 1887, when he lost the re-election. Meanwhile, he served as the mayor of Richebourg in Yvelines near Paris. Eventually, he served as a member of the French Senate from 1892 to 1898, representing Seine-et-Oise. During his tenure as senator, he debated bills about the Panama Canal and French Algeria.

== Personal life, death and legacy ==
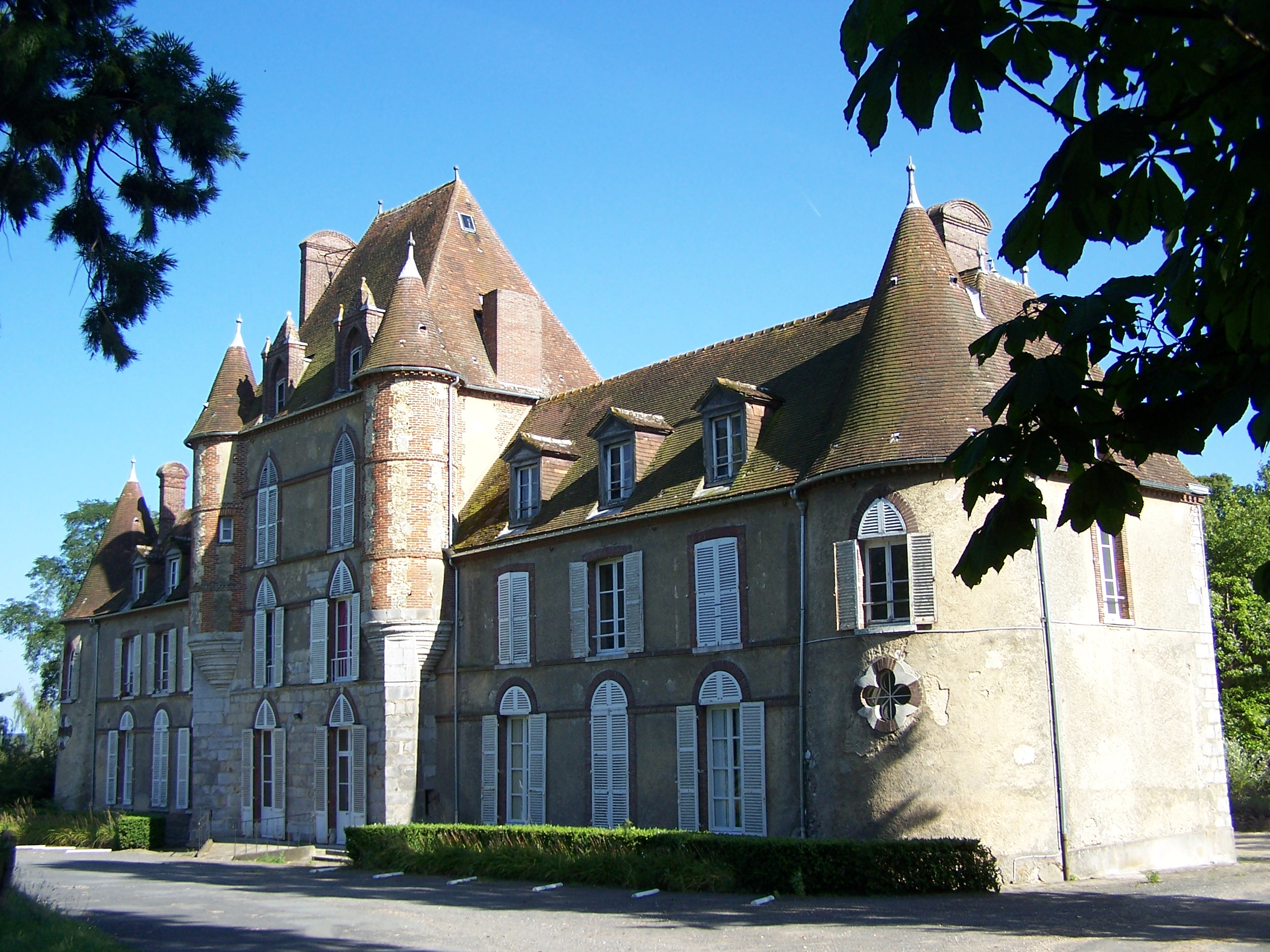
The Manoir de la Troche.

Hamel married Mathilde Huber. They had a son, Edouard Hamel, and a daughter, Louise, who married Paul Maitrot de Varenne. He purchased the Manoir de la Troche in Richebourg from the Dufresne in 1880.

Hamel died on 6 January 1898 in Paris. He was 71 years old. He was buried at the Père Lachaise Cemetery. His son, Edouard Hamel, inherited his manor and served as the mayor of Richebourg.

== Works ==
- Hamel, Ernest (1848). La Liberté, hymne au peuple français. Paris: Imprimerie de J. Frey. OCLC 457598305.
- Hamel, Ernest (1849). Concours pour l'auditorat au Conseil d'État. Du Système de revenus publics adopté par l'Assemblée constituante de 1789, et du système de revenus publics tel qu'il existait au 1er janvier 1848. Paris: Imprimerie de Lacour. OCLC 457598171.
- Hamel, Ernest (1851). Les derniers chants. Paris: Garnier frères. OCLC 457598186.
- Hamel, Ernest (1858). Les Principes de 1789 et les titres de noblesse. Paris: Ledoyen. OCLC 457598426.
- Hamel, Ernest (1859). Histoire de Saint-Just député à la Convention nationale. Paris: Poulet-Malassis et de Broise. OCLC 3125275.
- Hamel, Ernest (1860). Lhomond et sa statue. Paris: E. Dentu. OCLC 457598297.
- Hamel, Ernest (1860). Victor Hugo. Paris: Imprimerie de L. Tinterlin. OCLC 681755860.
- Hamel, Ernest (1862). Marie la Sanglante : histoire de la grande réaction Catholique sous Marie Tudor : précédée d'un essai sur la chute du Catholicisme en Angleterre. Paris: Poulet-Malassis. OCLC 794213619.
- Hamel, Ernest (1865–1867). Histoire de Robespierre : d'après des papiers de famille, les sources originales et des documents entièrement inédits. Paris: A. Lacroix. OCLC 54897233.
- Hamel, Ernest (1868). La Statue de J.-J. Rousseau. Paris: A. Faure. OCLC 2182117.
- Hamel, Ernest (1869). M. Michelet historien. Paris: E. Dentu. OCLC 457598344.
- Hamel, Ernest (1870). Précis de l'histoire de la Révolution française. Paris: Pagnerre. OCLC 457598377.
- Hamel, Ernest (1872). Histoire de la République Francaise sous le directoire et sous le consulat, faisant suite au Précis de l'histoire de la révolution. Paris: Pagnerre. OCLC 14366135.
- Hamel, Ernest (1872). Lettre sur l'instruction primaire et les instituteurs. Amiens: Progrès de la Somme. OCLC 464741439.
- Hamel, Ernest (1872). Les Origines de la Révolution. Paris: Librairie de la Bibliothèque nationale. OCLC 38929674.
- Hamel, Ernest (1873). Histoire des deux conspirations du général Malet. Paris: Librairie de la Société des Gens de Lettres. OCLC 490282031.
- Hamel, Ernest (1873). Histoire illustrée du second empire précédée des évènements de 1848 à 1852. Paris: Degorce-Cadot. OCLC 461227728.
- Hamel, Ernest (1878). Souvenirs de l'homme libre : la politique républicaine. Paris: E. Dentu. OCLC 457598452.
- Hamel, Ernest (1882). Histoire du Premier Empire : faisant suite à l'histoire de la République sous le Directoire et le Consulat. Paris: E. Dentu. OCLC 14401000.
- Hamel, Ernest (1887). Histoire de la restauration : faisant suite à l'Histoire du premier empire, avril 1814-juillet 1830. Paris: Jouvet. OCLC 716357989.
- Hamel, Ernest (1889–1890). Histoire du règne de Louis-Philippe faisant suite à l'histoire de la Restauration, juillet 1830-février 1848. Paris: Jouvet. OCLC 716548283.
- Hamel, Ernest (1891). Histoire de la seconde République, faisant suite à l'Histoire du règne de Louis-Philippe : février 1848-décembre 1851. Paris: Jouvet. OCLC 421965041.
- Hamel, Ernest (1895). La maison de Robespierre. Paris: Al. Charles. OCLC 14337626.
- Hamel, Ernest (1897). Thermidor : d'après les sources originales et les documents authentiques. Paris: Flammarion. OCLC 566008643.
- Hamel, Ernest (1898). Euloge Schneider : Pages posthumes. Paris: H. Champion. OCLC 461778419.
