= Gustav Brühl (author) =

American poet

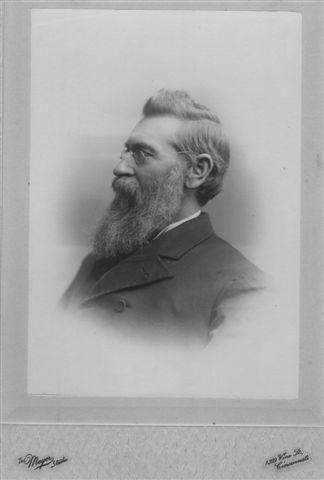
- Born: 31 May 1826; Herdorf
- Died: 16 February 1903; Cincinnati
- Occupations: Writer, travel writer, medical doctor

Gustav Brühl (born 31 May 1826 in Herdorf, Prussia; died 16 February 1903 in Cincinnati) was an American physician, poet and archaeologist.

== Biography ==
He studied at the colleges of Siegen, Münstereifel, and Treves, and graduated from the last named. He then studied medicine, history and philosophy at the Ludwig-Maximilians-Universität München, the University of Halle, and the Friedrich Wilhelm University of Berlin. In 1848, he immigrated to Cincinnati, Ohio. He was physician of St. Mary's Hospital, lecturer on laryngoscopy in Miami Medical College.

He was one of the founders and first president of the Peter Claver Society for the education of black children. In 1874, he was one of the examiners of public schools in Cincinnati. In 1871 was nominated by the Democrats for state treasurer.

He pursued archaeological and ethnological studies. This work took him to Mexico and Central and South America.

== Writings ==
He published Poesien des Urwalds (1871), and wrote much for periodicals, both in prose and in verse. From 1869 until 1871, he edited Der Deutsche Pionier ("The German Pioneer").

== Family ==
He was married to Margarete Reis. They had three children.
