= Vasily Lyovshin =

Russian writer

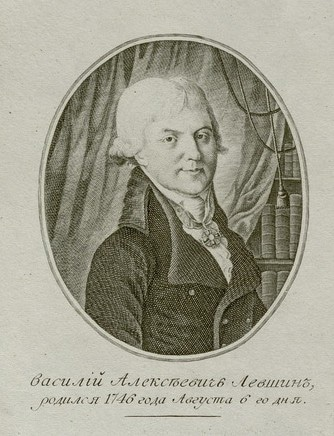

Vasily Alekseyevich Lyovshin (Russian: Василий Алексеевич Лёвшин; July 17, 1746 – August 10, 1826) was a Russian writer.

Born in Smolensk, he wrote on agricultural and economic subjects and was close to Nikolay Novikov's circle.

Lyovshin's utopian novel Noveysheye puteshestviye (The Newest Voyage, 1784) contains the first Russian fictional flight to the Moon.
