= Albert Harrison Hoyt =

American lawyer (1826–1915)

- Born: 1826; Sandwich, New Hampshire, US
- Died: 1915 (aged 88–89)
- Education: Wesleyan University
- Occupations: Editor and author
- Writing career
- Notable work: Necrology of the New England Colleges

Albert Harrison Hoyt (1826–1915) was an American editor and author, born in Sandwich, New Hampshire. He graduated from Wesleyan University in 1850, studied and practiced law in Portsmouth, New Hampshire, and was a paymaster in the army during the American Civil War, rising to the rank of lieutenant-colonel. After the peace he was editor of the New England Historical and Genealogical Register (1868–76) and of Memorial Biographies, volume iv (1885). He was elected a member of the American Antiquarian Society in 1875.

== Bibliography ==
Some of the works authored by Hoyt include:

- Necrology of the New England Colleges (1869–70)
- Captain Francis Goelet's Visit to Boston, etc., in 1745-50 (1870)
- Letters of Sir William Pepperell, Bart. (1874)
- The Name Columbia (1886)
