= Jacob ben Abraham Kahana =

Jacob ben Abraham Kahana (Hebrew: יעקב בן אברהם כהנא; died 1826) was a rabbinical author. His father was rabbi at Brestowitz, government of Grodno. Jacob was the son-in-law of Rabbi Issachar of Vilna, brother of the Vilna Gaon. He lived with his father-in-law, and was supported by him for many years, so that he was able to devote his time to the study of the Law; and he became one of the leading Talmudical scholars in Vilna. After Issachar's death Jacob was appointed trustee of the charities of the city. He died in Vilna.

Jacob was the author of Shittot, a commentary on the tractate Erubin. The work is divided into three parts, the first consisting of novellæ on the Gemara, the second of novellæ on the Tosefta, and the third of novellæ on the corresponding tractates in the Yerushalmi. The manuscript was revised and the work published in Lemberg, 1863, by Raphael Nathan Rabbinowicz.
