= Francesco Soave =

Italian philosopher and pedagogist

- Born: 10 June 1743; Lugano, Switzerland
- Died: 17 February 1806 (aged 62); Pavia, Kingdom of Italy
- Occupations: Philosopher; Pedagogist; University teacher
- Parent(s): Carlo Giuseppe Soave and Chiara Francesca Herrick

Education
- Education: Collegio Clementino

Philosophical work
- Region: Western philosophy; Italian philosophy
- Institutions: University of Parma; University of Pavia
- Notable students: Alessandro Manzoni

Francesco Soave (10 June 1743 – 17 January 1806) was a Swiss educator and philosopher.

== Early life ==
Francesco Soave was born in Lugano, Switzerland, on 10 June 1743. He attended schools run by the Order of Clerics Regular of Somasca and later joined the order. Sent to Parma, he taught poetry and eloquence at the College for Noblemen and the University of Parma, under minister Guillaume du Tillot.

Soave introduced Locke's and Kant's philosophy to Italy through teaching and translations. He promoted an eclectic empiricism based on Locke, Condillac, and Bonnet. His translations of Salomon Gessner's New Idylls and Edward Young's The Force of Religion influenced the preromantic movement. In 1772, he wrote Intorno all'istituzione naturale d'una società e d'una lingua, e all'influenza dell'una e dell'altra sulle umane cognizioni (On the natural formation of a society and language, and their influence on human knowledge).

Appointed professor of philosophy at the Brera Academy in Milan in 1772, Soave reformed teaching methods, wrote and translated educational works, and established schools in Lombardy. His educational works included children's literature. His Novelle Morali (Moral Tales) won a prize from Count Carlo Bettoni in Brescia for promoting virtue and discouraging vice in young readers. The collection, a milestone in Italian children's literature, saw over 100 editions between 1782 and 1909. In 1795, Soave wrote Vera idea della Rivoluzione di Francia (True meaning of the French Revolution), opposing revolutionary ideas, which was frequently reprinted.

He died in Pavia on 17 January 1806, while serving as professor of ideology at the university.

== Works ==
- Ricerche intorno all'istituzione naturale d'una società e d'una lingua (1772)
- Novelle morali (1782)
- Istituzioni di logica, metafisica ed etica (1791)
- La filosofia di Kant esposta ed esaminata (1803)
- La mitologia ossia esposizione delle favole e descrizioni dei riti religiosi dei gentili..., con l'aggiunta d'un transunto delle Metamorfosi d'Ovidio (1810)
- Storia del popolo ebreo compendiata, ad uso delle scuole (1813)
- Memoria sopra il progetto di Elementi di ideologia di Antoine Destutt de Tracy (1809)
- Esame dei principi metafisici della Zoonomia di Erasmus Darwin (1809)

== Bibliography ==
- Garin, Eugenio (2008). History of Italian Philosophy. Vol. 1. Translated by Giorgio A. Pinton. Amsterdam: Rodopi. pp. 783–787.
- Grossi, Angelo; Gianella, Laura (1944). Francesco Soave. Vita e scritti scelti. Lugano.
- Claudio Marazzini, Simone Fornara (eds.), Francesco Soave e la grammatica del Settecento, Atti del convegno di Vercelli (21 marzo 2002), Alessandria, Edizioni dell'Orso.
- Micheli, Giuseppe (2019). "SOAVE, Francesco". Dizionario Biografico degli Italiani (in Italian). Vol. 93: Sisto V–Stammati. Rome: Istituto dell'Enciclopedia Italiana. ISBN 978-88-12-00032-6.
- Orelli, Giovanni. La Svizzera italiana, in Alberto Asor Rosa (ed.), Letteratura italiana. Storia e geografia. L'età contemporanea, 3, 1989, pp. 885–918.
- Lindon, John (2002). "Soave, Francesco". The Oxford Companion to Italian Literature. Oxford: Oxford University Press. ISBN 978-0-19-818332-7.
- Roggero, Marina (2013). "La voie italienne vers l'alphabet avant 1860". Histoire de l'éducation. 138 (138): 17–33. doi:10.4000/histoire-education.2648.
