= Waller Rodwell Wright =

British diplomat and author (1775–1826)

Waller Rodwell Wright (1775 – 20 April 1826) was an English barrister, author and diplomat. His best-known work was the poem Horæ Ionicæ. He was British consul-general for the Septinsular Republic (Ionian Islands) from 1800 to 1804.

== Early life and education ==
Wright was born in Bury St Edmunds, Suffolk, the son of Mathew Wright. He was educated at King Edward VI Free Grammar School in Bury St Edmunds. In 1791, he was admitted to Trinity College, Cambridge. He was called to the bar at Lincoln's Inn in 1793,

== Career ==
From 1800–04, Wright was British consul-general for the republic of the Seven Islands (Ionian Islands).

On his return to England he became recorder for Bury St Edmunds. Subsequently he was president of the court of appeals at Malta, where he died in 1826. Wright's library at Zante was rifled after his departure in 1804, possibly during French occupation in 1807-09, and the materials which he had collected for a work upon the Greek islands were scattered or destroyed.

Wright was an influential Freemason. He was involved in the creation of the United Grand Lodge of England as he was a close friend of both the last Grand Masters, Prince Edward, Duke of Kent and Strathearn of the Antient Grand Lodge of England and Prince Augustus Frederick, Duke of Sussex of the Premier Grand Lodge of England. He was also the Grand Master of the Masonic Knights Templar from 1807 to 1812 and introduced Royal Arch Masonry to the Mediterranean region.

== Works ==
His reminiscences took the form of Horæ Ionicæ: a Poem descriptive of the Ionian Islands and part of the adjacent coast of Greece (London, 1809, 8vo). There are some charming lines among its heroic couplets, the work throughout of an ardent disciple of Pope. A ‘Postscript’ contains a few remarks upon the Modern Greek spoken in the Ionian Islands. To the third edition (London, 1816, 12mo) were appended ‘Orestes, a Tragedy: from the Italian of Count Vittor Alfieri’ (this was in blank verse, for which Wright showed little aptitude), and two odes. One of these odes, on the Duke of Gloucester's installation at Cambridge, had been printed in 1811 and forwarded in September by Dallas to Byron, who wrote: "It is evidently the production of a man of taste and a poet, though I should not be willing to say it was fully equal to what might be expected from the author of Horæ Ionicæ". In reference to this poem Byron had previously written in English Bards:

Blest is the man who dare approach the bower
Where dwelt the Muses in their natal hour …
Wright, 'twas thy happy lot at once to view
Those shores of Glory, and to sing them too.
