= Jean Skipwith =

Virginia plantation owner, horticulturalist, and book collectoc

Jean Skipwith, Lady Skipwith (February 21, 1747 or 1748 – May 19, 1826) was a Virginia plantation owner, horticulturist, and book collector. She is best known for designing and documenting an extensive botanical garden at Prestwould Plantation, as well as compiling one of the largest libraries assembled by an American woman in the early 19th century. Her manuscript notes and garden plans provide insight into the scientific and domestic interests of elite Southern women during this era.

== Early life ==
Born Jane Miller, February 21, 1747 or 1748, in Prince George County, Virginia, youngest of four children of Hugh and Jane (Bolling) Miller, tobacco grower, merchant, and vestryman of Old Blandford Church of Bristol Parish, Petersburg, VA.; Mr. Miller returned to Scotland with his family before December 8, 1760.

== Family and marriage ==
Jean's older sister, Anne, had married Sir Peyton Skipwith, 7th Baronet, in 1765. Anne died in childbirth in 1779.

Although the historical record is incomplete regarding Miller's residence in Scotland between 1760 and 1786, the Skipwith Family Papers show bills and receipts for her book purchases in Edinburgh in 1781. By 1786, she had returned to Virginia and was living at Elm Hill Plantation. On September 7, 1788, Sir Peyton wrote to Jean Miller, expressing his wish "to complete a union on which my future happiness so much and so immediately depends." He requested her permission to tell his daughter that, on a journey to Cototoman, he would be accompanied by "Lady Skipwith and not Miss Miller . . . by their [new] mother and not their aunt." They were married on September 25, 1788, in Granville, North Carolina, and by April 1789, Lady Skipwith was corresponding with Samuel Goode regarding hop roots. Lady Skipwith's first daughter, Helen, was born June 25, 1789, at Elm Hill Plantation.

In January 1788, letters to Sir Peyton began to be addressed to him at his new house, Prestwould Plantation, in Mecklenburg County, named for Prestwold Hall, the country home of the Skipwith family. Originally, the plantation had been acquired by William Byrd II and named "Blue Stone Castle." On November 6, 1765, Sir Peyton paid William Byrd III 200 pounds for the plot of Blue Stone Castle land that would become Prestwould (deeded Oct. 30, 1765). The family moved to Prestwould in 1797, a Georgian-style house sitting above the Roanoke River. Prestwould Plantation, its outbuildings, and its grounds are now a National Historic Landmark and are open to the public, including what may be the earliest known slave house in Virginia. This was a working tobacco plantation with farm and livestock, a mill, blacksmith shop, store, ferry, and where thoroughbred horses were raised. The plantation's records reflect many skilled laborers, as well as meticulous bills of sale for slaves. By the time of Sir Peyton Skipwith's death in 1805, the Skipwiths owned over 200 slaves.

Prestwould's extensive archives are held by The College of William & Mary, Earl Gregg Swem Library Special Collections. These archives include plans for the house and gardens. A large collection of needlework patterns in her hand are owned by the Colonial Williamsburg Foundation.

== Garden ==
It was at Prestwould Plantation that Lady Skipwith had her garden built by enslaved laborers, overseen by Samuel Dedman. A receipt signed by Samuel Dedman on April 24, 1801, states that Dedman had received "Twenty two dollars in part for my services in building [the] Garden." Correspondence and receipts suggest that Dedman worked closely with Lady Skipwith to implement her design, for two sketches in Lady Skipwith's hand map out several garden plots. Her sketches feature highly-organized garden plots crisscrossed by "boardwalks," some wide enough for wheelbarrows, pony carts, or couples taking exercise to pass through. The plans also indicate where Lady Skipwith intended to plant verbena, strawberry, crocus, phlox, violets, pansies, and portulaca, as well as annuals and shrubbery.

The archives include records of Lady Skipwith's orders for vegetables, roots and bulbs, which she grew in raised beds. She ordered from Prince Nurseries on Long Island, as did George Washington and Thomas Jefferson.

Lady Skipwith often corresponded with neighbors, requesting cuttings of plants she could then add to her own collections, or offering gardening advice of her own. "Plumb Stones," for instance, were acquired from "General Parsons." Her extensive botanical notes also describe where each kind of plant was grown at Prestwould, what the ideal conditions for its growth were, and how it should be cared for. She listed the many wildflowers she collected, including trillium and viola, identifying them from Philip Miller's Gardener's Dictionary—and noting when they were not in that source. For instance, she recorded that "The Sealy Pink coloured root from the Point of the Island" was of the "9th Sort -- Miller." She kept records of her fruit crops, notes on how to raise trees from cuttings, and lists of what she planted. "Wintering plants," including "Oranges, Lemons, and Limes" were grown in a glass-walled orangery abutting the garden. Lady Skipwith's botanical notes often connected a plant with its use. Of a particular kind of apple, the "Maryland Red Steeck," Lady Skipwith noted that it "Makes a fine strong Cyder and keeps through the winter better than almost any other apples."

Lady Skipwith was a keeper of lists. She listed "Shrubs to be got when I can". Among her house plants she listed, not only oranges, lemons, and limes, but also oleander, dwarf myrtle, rose geranium and chrysanthemum, observing that those would "live in the garden through the winter though the first frost would destroy the flower." Living, as she did, far from markets and major trade routes, Lady Skipwith also listed, for example, "Bulbous roots to get when in my power. . . . Meadow saffron a bulbous root about the size of a tulip, flowers in autumn and the leaves continue green all winter. Called by the common people Naked Ladies, great varieties may be obtained from seed".

== Later life and death ==
After her husband's death in 1805, Lady Skipwith managed Prestwould Plantation for the next 21 years.

Lady Skipwith died on May 19, 1826. Of her death "after an illness of 3 days," Dr. Robert Redd of Mecklenburg County, Virginia, noted that "she, to the last, would not allow a Physician to be sent for. The character of this truly unique woman is well known. -- May her everlasting life be as happy as her days here were profitable."

By her death, Lady Skipwith had acquired a library of more than 850 volumes. Her library was among the largest private collections assembled by a woman in early America. Her collection, the product of an independent and curious mind, also reflected her interests in botany, gardening, travel, geography, and history. Her will included a provision that allowed her daughters and daughter-in-law to choose 200 books each from her library, and left her son-in-law her Encyclopædia Britannica.
