= Henrik Krohn =

Norwegian poet and magazine editor (1826–1879)

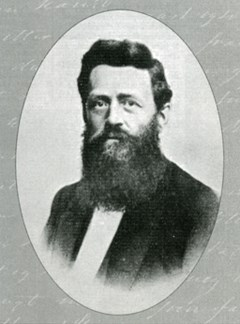
Portrait of Henrik Krohn

Henrik Krohn (10 May 1826 – 14 June 1879) was a Norwegian poet, magazine editor and proponent for Nynorsk language.

== Biography ==
Krohn was born in Bergen on 10 May 1826. Among his works is the poetry collection Smaakvæde from 1867. He founded the Nynorsk organization Vestmannalaget in 1868, and edited the organization's magazine Fraa by og bygd. A collection of his works was published in 1909.
