= Însemnare a călătoriei mele =

Romanian-language travelogue

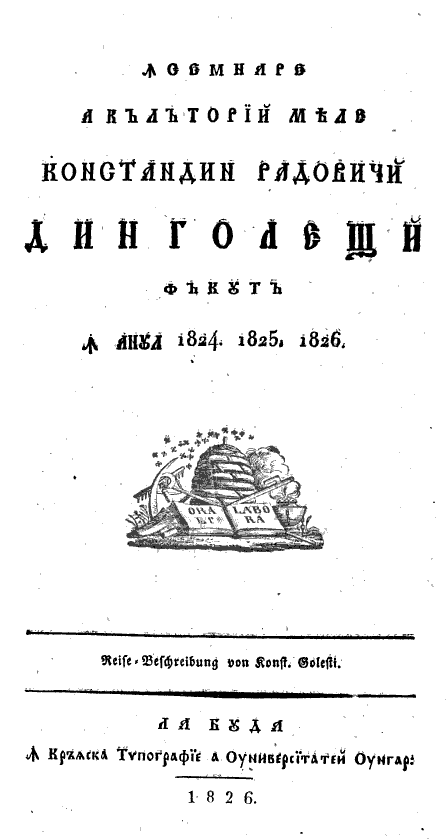
Frontispice of the 1826 edition, written in Romanian Cyrillic alphabet

Însemnare a călătoriei mele (Romanian for "Accounts of my travel") is a travelogue written by Dinicu Golescu and published in Pest in 1826. Golescu describes his voyage in Transylvania, Hungary, Austria, Northern Italy, Bavaria and Switzerland.

The book is notable not only for being the first travelogue written in Romanian, but also for describing institutions in Western civilization and criticizing their absence at home in Wallachia. At the end of the book, the author proposes a full reform of the Romanian institution towards the "European" direction.

While the literary merit of the book is sometimes questioned, all major 20th century Romanian literary critics agreed that it is an important work.
