= 1793 in literature =

This article contains information about the literary events and publications of 1793.

== Events ==
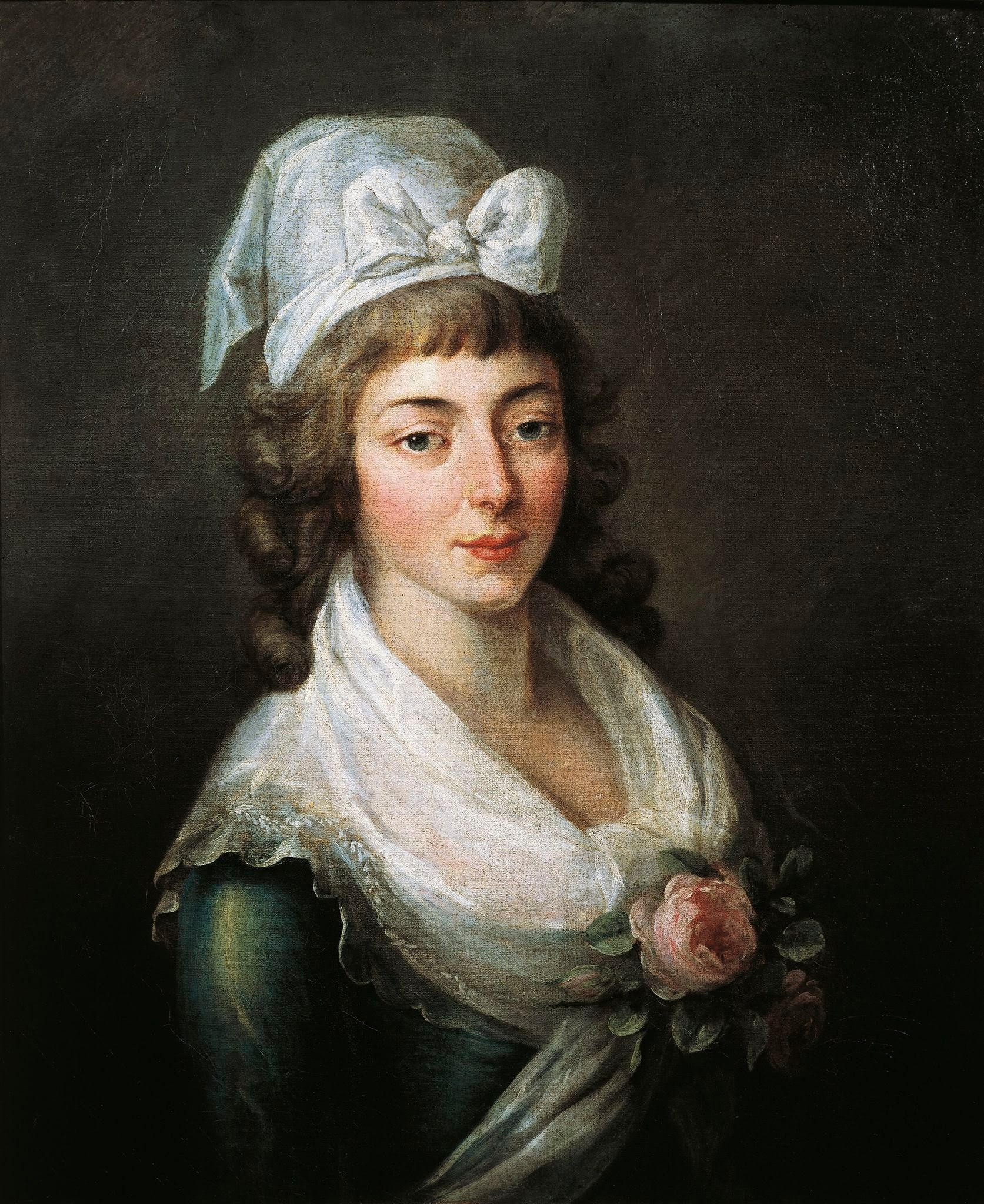
Madame Roland, unknown artist, Musée Lambinet

- February 7 – The day after the poverty-stricken playwright Carlo Goldoni dies, the National Convention votes to restore his French state pension, which has been suspended due to the French Revolution. It is passed on to his widow Nicoletta Conio.
- June 1 – In the Reign of Terror in Paris, the Girondist Madame Roland is arrested for treason. She writes Appel à l'impartiale postérité in prison before being guillotined on November 8.
- Summer – William Wordsworth tours western England and Wales (passing by Tintern Abbey). His first poems, An Evening Walk and Descriptive Sketches are published this year.
- October–November – During the Reign of Terror in the French Revolution, the English writer Helen Maria Williams is imprisoned with her family in the Luxembourg Palace and later in the Convent des Anglaises in Paris, where she continues her translations of French-language works into English, including what will prove to be a popular version of Bernardin St. Pierre's novel Paul et Virginie (1788). To this she appends her own prison sonnets.
- November 2 – The French dramatist Olympe de Gouges is sentenced to death by a revolutionary tribunal. Both she and her prosecutors quote the manuscript of her unfinished play La France Sauvée in evidence.
- December 9 – New York City's first daily newspaper, the American Minerva, is founded by Noah Webster.
- unknown date – James Lackington opens his "Temple of the Muses" bookshop in Finsbury Square, London.
- The Royal Library, Denmark, in Copenhagen, opens to the public.

== New books ==
=== Fiction ===
- Eliza Parsons – The Castle of Wolfenbach
- Charlotte Turner Smith
  - The Old Manor House
  - The Emigrants
- Jane West as 'Prudentia Homespun' – The Advantages of Education, or The History of Maria Williams
- Johann Heinrich Daniel Zschokke – Abällino, der grosse Bandit

=== Drama ===
- Étienne Aignan – La mort de Louis XVI
- Elizabeth Inchbald – Everyone Has His Fault
- Edward Jerningham – The Siege of Berwick
- Jean-Louis Laya – Ami des lois
- Edward Morris – False Colours
- Arthur Murphy – The Rival Sisters
- John O'Keeffe
  - The London Hermit
  - The World in a Village
- Frederick Reynolds – How to Grow Rich

=== Poetry ===
- William Blake
  - Songs of Experience
  - Visions of the Daughters of Albion
- Alvarenga Peixoto – Canto Genetlíaco

=== Non-fiction ===
- William Frend – Peace and Union Recommended to the Associated Bodies of Republicans and Anti-Republicans

== Births ==
- February 2 – Mary Elizabeth Mohl, née Clarke, English-born literary saloniste (died 1883)
- April 4 – Casimir Delavigne, French poet and dramatist (died 1843)
- May 4 – Dorothea Primrose Campbell, Scottish poet and novelist (died 1863)
- June 1 – Henry Francis Lyte, English hymnist and cleric (died 1847)
- June 28 – Georg Friedrich Schömann, German classicist (died 1879)
- July 2 – Joseph Isidore Samson, French playwright and actor (died 1871)
- July 13 – John Clare, English "peasant poet" (died 1864)
- July 15 – Almira Hart Lincoln Phelps, American educator, scientist and writer (died 1884)
- August 25 – John Neal, American novelist and critic (died 1876)
- September 25 – Felicia Hemans, English poet (died 1835)
- October 1 – Peter Kaiser, Liechtenstein statesman and historian (died 1864)
- November 28 – Carl Jonas Love Almqvist, Swedish novelist (died 1866)
- December 15 – Henry Charles Carey, American economist (died 1879)
- December 28 – Karl Friedrich Neumann, German Orientalist (died 1870)
- unknown date – Sarah Austin, English editor and translator (died 1867)

== Deaths ==
- January 4 – Bengt Lidner, Swedish poet (born 1757)
- February 6 – Carlo Goldoni, Italian dramatist and librettist (born 1707)
- April 2 – Colin Macfarquhar, Scottish bookseller and printer, co-founder of Encyclopædia Britannica (born c. 1745)
- April 29 – John Michell, English philosopher and cleric (born 1724)
- May 20 – Charles Bonnet, Swiss naturalist and philosopher (born 1720)
- June 26
  - Gilbert White, English naturalist, diarist and cleric (born 1720)
  - Karl Philipp Moritz (C. P. Moritz), German essayist and travel writer (born 1756)
- July 4 – Antoine-Marin Lemierre, French dramatist and poet (born 1733)
- November 3 – Olympe de Gouges, French dramatist and political activist (guillotined; born 1748)
- November 17 – Louis Pierre Manuel, French essayist and politician (guillotined, born 1751)
- December 22 – William Watkiss Lloyd, English polymath (born 1813)
