= Lewys Glyn Dyfi =

Lewis Meredith (22 March 1826 – 29 September 1891), known also as Lewys Glyn Dyfi, was a Welsh preacher and writer.

Born on 22 March 1826 near Machynlleth, Meredith attended day and Sunday schools at Machynlleth until his family moved to Cwmllinau wherein was educated in Cemmaes. He was involved in the founding of a literary society in Machynlleth c. 1854. At this time, he worked for the printer Adam Evans. While he began preaching to the Wesleyans in 1849, the uncertainty of his health prevented him from being accepted for the ministry in 1855. In 1855-6 he oversaw the Welsh Wesleyans at Witton Park, Durham before emigrating to the U.S.A. He spent a year at a seminary and was consequently accepted as a minister of the Methodist Episcopal Church. Meredith nonetheless maintained his links to Wales by writing to the Eurgrawn and the Drych magazines, and by taking charge of Chicago's Welsh Wesleyan church. He returned to Wales in 1863 in an attempt to gain support for the North in the American Civil War. Meredith gained the nickname Lewys Glyn Dyfi after he published Blodau Glyn Dyfi, a Welsh book of verse, in 1852.

Lewis married Millie E. Phelps in 1865. He died 29 September 1891.
