= Pietro Amat di San Filippo =

Italian geographer, historian and bibliographer (1826-1895)

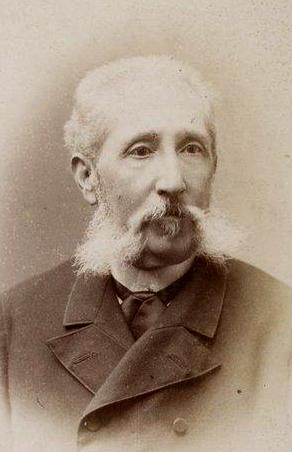

Pietro Amat di San Filippo (Cagliari, 22 October 1826 – Rome, February 15, 1895) was an Italian geographer, historian and bibliographer.

== Family ==
He was born to a noble Sardinian family of Catalan origin. He was the fourth of fifteen siblings, the children of Giuseppe Amat di San Filippo. Cardinal Luigi Amat di San Filippo e Sorso was his uncle. He married Donna Angela Musio, daughter of a judge and Senator, and they had seven children.

== Career ==
He studied at the Barnabites High School in Bologna, then undertook a diplomatic career as a secretary of legation to the Holy See in 1851. Later he left diplomacy and became an officer of the Sardinian National Archive (Archivio di Stato) in his hometown. In these years he undertook studies in geography and became a member of the Italian Geographical Society. Due to his interest and his publications in economics, he was appointed a secretary of the Ministry of Finance in Rome, where he ended his career.

== Works ==
All Amat's works were printed in Italian; in order to provide a better understanding of their content to the English reader, in the following list titles are translated into English.

- Trade and navigation of the island of Sardinia in the fourteenth and fifteenth centuries: with some unreleased or rare documents (1865)
- The colonies in Sardinia: especially those established under the government of Savoy (1738-1824) and the convenience of promoting colonization as the primary tool of economic refurbishing on islands (1867)
- General Statistical Yearbook and the island of Sardinia for calendar year 1868 (1868, editor)
- Illustrated Bibliography of Italian travelers in chronological order (1874)
- The planisphere of Bartolomeo Pareto 1455 and four other charts have just been found in the library of Vittorio Emanuele in Rome (1878, from "Memoirs of the Geographical Society" excerpt)
- World Map, drawn in 1436 by the Venetian Bianco (preserved in the Marciana in Venice): the notes (1879, excerpt from "Maritime Magazine”)
- Navigations and maritime discoveries in West Africa by Italians along the XIII, XIV and XV centuries (1880, excerpt from the "Bulletin of the Italian Geographical Society”)
- World maps, nautical charts, pilot books and other cartographic monument, especially Italian, of the thirteenth and seventeenth centuries (1882, with Gustavo Uzielli: second part of the biographical and bibliographical studies on the history of geography in Italy, published on the occasion of the third International Geographical Society Congress)
- Two unpublished letters of Italian adventurers in America (1534) (1885, excerpt from the "Bulletin of the Italian Geographical Society”)
- The distinguished Italian travelers: with an anthology of their writings (1885)
- Of ancient and modern relations between Italy and India (1886, awarded by the Accademia dei Lincei)
- Recent finds of nautical charts in Paris, London and Florence (1888)
- The real discoverers of the Azore Islands (1892, excerpt from the "Bulletin of the Italian Geographical Society")
- Italian bibliography on Christopher Columbus, the discovery of the New World and traveling in America (1893, collaboration with Giuseppe Fumagalli: the sixth volume of the collection of published documents and studies by the Royal Colombian Commission)
- Of slavery and serfdom in Sardinia (1894, from the "Italian history Miscellaneous" excerpt)
- Surveys and studies on the economic history of Sardinia (1902, posthumous)

== Legacy ==
Pietro Amat has given valuable contributions to three main lines of study:

- in the history of Sardinia, he has been the first researcher in modern time to emphasize the importance of Spanish and Catalan archives;
- as far as the history of geography and cartography is concerned, he published for the first time several relics and original studies; he was Ludovico de Varthema's first biographer;
- in the field of bibliography he has also published complete and detailed studies on geography and on Italian geographers.

In general terms, he was in contact with contemporary cultural milieu and his main legacy is in following a scientific method in his research, in which he was one among the first scholars: he based his studies on original, usually unpublished, documents.

== Bibliography ==
- Raffaele Ciasca, article in Istituto dell'Enciclopedia Italiana (editor), Enciclopedia italiana di scienze, lettere ed arti (Italian Encyclopaedia of Science and Arts), Rome, volume I.
- Francesco Amat, "Pietro Amat Vivaldi", in the sheet published in the website of the Sardinian Association of Heraldry (Associazione araldica della Sardegna), by clicking on Genealogie -> Alberi genealogici -> Albero genealogico della famiglia Amat;
- Annalisa D'Ascenzo, Pietro Amat di San Filippo e gli studi biografici e bibliografici nei documenti editi ed inediti della Società geografica italiana (Pietro Amat di San Filippo and biographical and bibliographical studies in unpublished documents of the Italian Geographical Society), in "Notiziario del Centro italiano per gli studi storico-geografici", 7 (1999), n.3, pp. 167–215.
- Francesco Cesare Casula, article in idem, Dizionario storico sardo (Sardinian historical dictionary), L'unione sarda, Cagliari, 2006, volume I.
