= Lucy Ellen Guernsey =

American writer

- Born: August 12, 1826; Pittsford, New York
- Died: November 3, 1899 (aged 73)
- Language: English, Spanish
- Genre: Domestic Fiction
- Subject: Children's Novels
- Years active: 1855–1885
- Relatives: James T. Guernsey, Electra Guernsey, Clara F. Guernsey

Lucy Ellen Guernsey (August 12, 1826 – November 3, 1899) was a 19th-century American author who lived in Rochester, New York. She was a strong proponent of early education and moral development in children, although she never had children of her own. Throughout her most productive years (1855–85) she wrote over 60 novels, most of which were published by the American Sunday School Union. She was an active member of the Rochester community; she founded the first sewing school for working-class children and was involved establishing the Home for Aged Women. She edited a popular religious publication, The Parish Visitor, taught an adult biblical class for Sunday School, and was the president of the Christ Church Missionary Society (1881–85).

== Family ==
Lucy and her sister Clara were daughters of James T. and Electra Guernsey. Her father, James, was a Rochester-area businessman and philanthropist who helped build up his community of western New York in both a cultural and moral fashion. In addition to his business ventures, he was largely responsible for introducing horticulture into the area. James was also known as an anti-slavery activist long before the abolitionist movement gained traction in the North, but among the community he was best known as a friend of the Native Americans. Among the famous Seneca chiefs he befriended, he was most intimate with Red Jacket and Cornplanter. When Lucy and Clara were young, her father invited twenty or thirty Seneca braves to stay in their house. This had a profound impact on Clara’s development, as she later went on to write about the Seneca tribes, aid them during a food shortage, and become a daughter of a local tribe. Although Lucy didn’t have as deep of a connection to the Senecas later in life, she was also a great friend like her father.

== Work and involvement ==
From an early age, Guernsey showed high potential for literary success later in life. After being home schooled she attended Miss Araminta Doolittle’s academy where she was noted as a model of “decorum and studiousness.” In later years, Guernsey devoted herself to charity work and editorial work at St. Luke’s church. She was an active member of the Rochester Female Charitable Society and a lifelong member of St. Luke’s church. Towards the beginning of her career as an author, she wrote for magazines such as Atlantic Monthly and Harpers, in addition to her publications with the American Sunday School Union. Guernsey worked with another religious publishing firm formerly known as Thomas Nelson and Sons (currently Thomas Nelson). During the last 11 productive years of her life she was in charge of editing the Parish Visitor, a religious publication intended for distribution in prisons, homes, and hospitals.

== Literary genre ==
A majority of Guernsey’s novels can be classified as works of domestic fiction. She often focused on problems associated with reaching responsible maturity and the implication of family life during these developmental times. In particular, Guernsey is most distinguished for her astute observations of people and animals as well as her natural dialogue. Often the American Sunday School Union publications were short pamphlets, yet Guernsey would write 200-page novels. Due to the sheer volume of her work, Guernsey was criticized for poorly constructed plots, but nevertheless, the content and morals of her stories were representative of the community’s preferred juvenile teachings.

== Literary works ==
- Alice and Bessie
- Binney the Beaver and Other Stories
- Blue Socks; or, Count the Cost
- The Chevalier's Daughter; Or, an Exile for the Truth (1880)
- The Chevalier's Daughter: Being One of the Stanton Corbet Chronicles
- The Child's Treasure of Stories
- Christmas at Cedar Hill: A Holiday Story-Book (1869)
- The Christmas Earnings; or, Ethel Fletcher's Temptation
- Claribel; or, Rest at Last
- Cousin Deborah's Story, or, The Great Plague
- Cub’s Apple; or, Next Time
- The Dark Night; or, Fear of Man Bringeth a Snare (1871)
- Duty and Inclination
- Ethel’s Trial in Becoming a Missionary
- The Fairchilds; or, Do What You Can (1871)
- The Foster-Sisters: or, Lucy Corbet's Chronicle (1882)
- Grandmother Brown's School-Days; or, Education As It Was Seventy Years Since
- Guy Falconer or, The chronicles of the old Moat House (1876)
- The Heiress of McGregor; or, Living for Self
- Henry Willson's Voyage: or, Only in Fun
- The Hidden Treasure: A Tale Of Troublous Times (1891)
- Irish Amy
- Jenny and the Birds
- Jenny and the Insects, or, Little Toilers and Their Industries
- Kitty Maynard; or, To Obey Is Better Than Sacrifice
- Lady Betty's Governess: or, The Corbet Chronicles
- Lady Rosamond's Book; or, Dawnings of Light (1903)
- Langham Revels; or, The Fair Dame of Stanton
- A Lent In Earnest; or, Sober Thoughts for Solemn Days
- Loveday's History: A Tale of Many Changes (1884)
- Mabel, or, The Bitter Root, A Tale of the Times of James the First
- Meat-eaters, with Some Account of Their Haunts and Habits
- Milly; or, The Hidden Cross.
- Miss Georgine’s Husband
- The Mission-Box; or, Doing Good and getting Good
- The Mother's Mission: Sketches from Real Life
- Myra Sherwood's Cross, and How She Bore It
- Nellie; or, the Best Inheritance (1867)
- No Talent and Phil’s Pansies
- The Object of Life
- Old Stanfield House
- Oldham; or, Beside All Waters
- Only in Fun; or, Henry Wilson’s Voyage
- Opposite Neighbours
- Orphan Nieces; or, Duty and Inclination
- Pattie Durant: A tale of 1662
- Percy's Holidays: or, Borrowing Trouble (1872)
- Ready Work for Willing Hands: or, The Story of Edith Allison
- The Red Plant (1872)
- Rhoda's Education; or, Too Much of a Good Thing
- The School-Girls' Treasury; or, Stories for Thoughtful Girls (1870)
- Sophie Kennedy's Experience
- The Sign of the Cross
- Story of a Hessian: A Tale of the Revolution in New Jersey
- Straight Forward
- The Straight Path
- Sunday-School Exhibition and its Consequences
- Sword of De Bardwell
- Tabby's and Her Travels; or, The Holiday Adventures of a Kitten: A Christmas and New-Year's Story
- The Tame Turtle: or, Geordie McGregor's Trouble
- The Tattler; or, The History of Patty Steele
- Three Girls of the Revolution
- Through Unknown Ways: or, The Journal-Books of Mrs. Dorathea Studley
- The Twin Roses And How They Were Trained
- Unknown Ways
- Upward and Onward; or, The History of Rob. Merritt
- Washington and Seventy-Six. By Lucy E. And Clara F. Guernsey
- Willing to Be Useful, or, Principle and Duty Illustrated in the Story Of Edith Allison
- Winifred, or, After Many Days
- Winifred; or, English Maiden in the Seventeenth Century
