= Siegfried August Mahlmann =

German poet

August Mahlmann
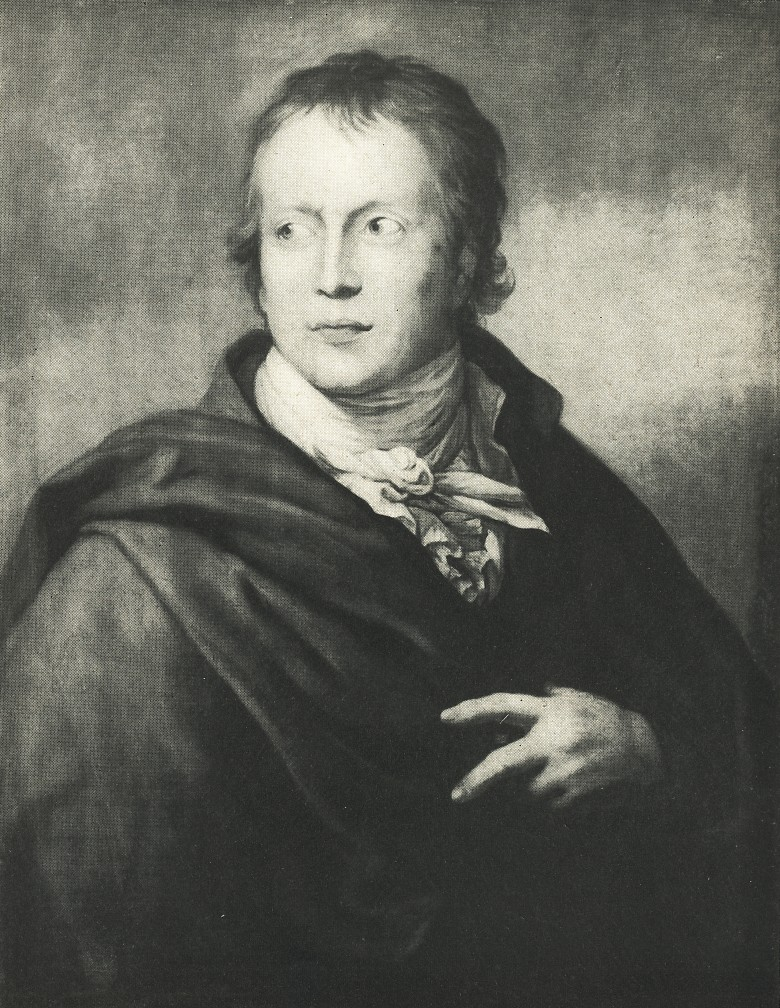
- Siegfried August Mahlmann
- Born: May 13, 1771; Leipzig
- Died: December 16, 1826 (aged 55)
- Education: University of Leipzig

Siegfried August Mahlmann (May 13, 1771 – December 16, 1826) was a German poet and editor.

Mahlmann was born in Leipzig, and studied law at the University of Leipzig. In his early life, he served as private tutor to a young nobleman, whom he accompanied to Göttingen and then on a trip through northern Europe. From 1799 he became a bookseller, writer, and editor. From 1806 to 1816 he edited the journal Zeitung für die elegante Welt, and from 1810 to 1818 the newspaper Leipziger Zeitung, the latter of which resulted in his brief imprisonment in 1813 by the French during the Napoleonic Wars, in the fortress of Erfurt.

Among his writings are a novel, Albano der Lautenspieler (1802), a parody of August von Kotzebue's Die Hussiten vor Naumburg (1803), and various short stories. His poetry was quite popular in the 19th century, and was published in a collection in 1825, and again posthumously in 8 volumes in 1839–40, and 3 volumes in 1859. The poems "Sehnsucht" (1802) and "Weinlied" (1808) were his most popular. In addition, he adapted the lyrics of "God Save the King" for the Kingdom of Saxony, as "Gott segne Sachsenland" ("God Save Saxony").

He later studied the natural sciences and economics, and was appointed director of the Leipzig Economic Society.
