= Bedros Magakyan =

Bedros Magakyan (1826–1891), was an Ottoman-Armenian actor and theater director. He was the founder of the Armenian Oriental Theater.

== Life ==
Bedros Magakyan founded a theater with actors of Armenian descent inspired by Europe and with permission from Sultan Abdülmecid I. The theater was founded in 1857 and originally performed classical European plays such as the works of Shakespeare.
