= Alfred Mézières =

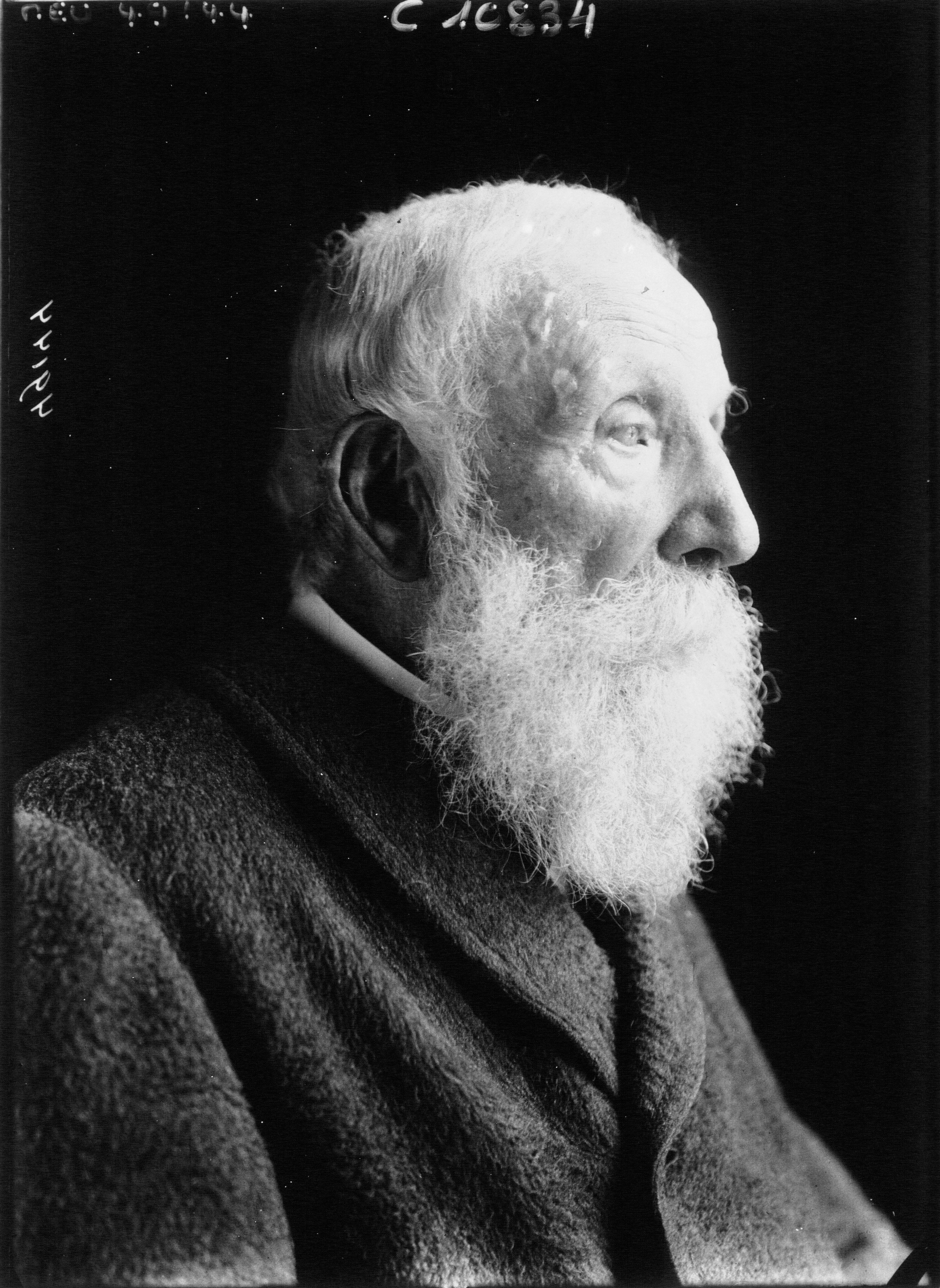
Mézières in 1914

Alfred Jean François Mézières (19 November 1826, in Réhon – 10 October 1915, in Réhon) was a French journalist, politician and historian of literature.

== Biography ==
Alfred Mézières was educated at Metz College and the École Normale Supérieure. He became a teacher at the French School of Athens, and later in Toulouse. He taught foreign literature at the University of Nancy in 1854, and was appointed professor of foreign literature at the Sorbonne in 1861.

In 1864, he co-founded the newspaper Le Temps. He served as an army officer in the Franco-Prussian war of 1870. He published studies on Shakespeare, Petrarch, Dante and Goethe and was elected to the Academie Francaise on January 29, 1874.

In 1874, he entered politics representing Longwy on the General Council of Meurthe-et-Moselle, serving as President of the Council twice, 1889 - 1892 and 1898 - 1906. He was elected to the Assemblee Nationale as the deputy of Meurthe-et-Moselle in 1881 and served until 1898. In 1900, he was elected senator for Meurthe-et-Moselle and in 1906, he became vice president of the Senate army commission.

In September 1914, the German army occupied Meziere’s house in Rehon and held him hostage. On October 3, 1915, he was finally allowed to leave in exchange for a German prisoner, but he died on October 10, 1915.

The rue Alfred Mezieres and four nearby schools in Nancy are named after him, as is the College Alfred Mezieres in Jarny.

== Works ==
- De Fluminibus inferorum, thesim proponebat Facultati litterarum parisiensi (1853)
- Étude sur les œuvres politiques de Paul Paruta (1853)
- Mémoires sur le Pélion et l'Ossa (1853)
- Description de la Laconie (1853)
- Shakespeare, ses œuvres et ses critiques (1860)
- Prédécesseurs et contemporains de Shakespeare (1863)
- Contemporains et successeurs de Shakespeare (1864)
- Le Jubilé de Shakespeare, souvenirs de Stratford-sur-Avon (1864)
- Dante et l'Italie nouvelle (1865)
- Pétrarque (1868)
- La Société française : le paysan, l'ouvrier, la bourgeoisie; l'aristocratie; les femmes, études morales sur le temps présent (1869)
- Le Siège de Strasbourg en 1870 (1870)
- Récits de l'invasion : Alsace et Lorraine (1871)
- W. Goethe : Les œuvres expliquées par la vie (1872-1873)
- Éducation morale et instruction civique à l'usage des écoles primaires (1883)
- En France, XVIIIe et XIXe siècles (1883)
- Hors de France. Italie, Espagne, Angleterre, Grèce moderne (1883, 1907)
- Le Collège Sainte-Barbe et les réformes universitaires (1885)
- Morale et patrie, lectures à l'usage des écoles primaires (1885)
- Vie de Mirabeau (1892)
- Morts et vivants (1897)
- Au temps passé (1906)
- Hommes et femmes d'hier et d'avant-hier (1907)
- Silhouettes de soldats (1907)
- De tout un peu (1909)
- Sites délaissés d'Orient (1911)
- Ultima verba (1914)
