= Manol Lazarov =

Manol Lazarov Sofiyanets (Bulgarian:Манол Лазаров Софиянец) born 1826 and died 1881, was a Bulgarian educationalist, poet and writer based in Sofia. He lived all except the last three years of his life in the Ottoman Empire.
