= Pamelia Sarah Vining =

Canadian poet

Pamelia Sarah Yule
- Born: Pamelia Sarah Vining; 10 April 1826; Clarendon, New York
- Died: 6 March 1897 (aged 70); Ingersoll, Ontario
- Occupations: Teacher, Author, Poet
- Spouse: James Colton Yule
- Writing career
- Pen name: P.S.V., Emillia, Xenette
- Genres: poetry, fiction
- Subject: religion

Pamelia Sarah Yule, née Vining, also known as Mrs. J. C. Yule (10 April 1826 – 6 March 1897) was an American born Canadian poet and writer.

== Biography ==
Yule was born in Clarendon, New York to Daniel Vining, a farmer, and Lydia Vining. She was educated at a local school and at home by her mother. She began teaching school in Michigan at the age of 15. She attended Albion College and eventually received a degree of Mistress of Science and Arts, an honorary degree then awarded to female graduates. In 1860 she taught English language and arts at Canadian Literary Institute in Woodstock, Ontario. In 1866, she married James Colton Yule and moved with him to Brantford where James ran a grammar school. In 1874 James accepted a professorship in New Testament studies at the institute. After James died in 1876, she devoted her time to church service and writing. She died in Ingersoll, Ontario in 1897.

== Writing career ==
Yule began writing poems during her time at Albion and published several in Wellman's Literary Miscellany using the pen-name Emillia. She also published under the initials P.S.V. and the name Xenette. After her husband's death, she turned to writing in a more religious style, producing some novels and books of poetry. Bruce Whiteman in his biography of Yule at the Dictionary of Canadian Biography characterized her writing as 'artificial and didactic'. He said her work reflected Canadian Victorian values of the time and was influenced by an unapologetic belief in Christianity.

== Works ==
- The Names Of Jesus, (1866)
- Ada Emory; or, The Sister's Bible [written as: Mrs James Colton YULE], (c1876)
- Poems Of The Heart And Home [written as: Mrs James Colton YULE], (1881)
- Up Hill; or, Paul Sutherland's Progress [written as: Mrs J C YULE], (1887)
- Sowing And Reaping; or, Records of the Ellisson Family [written as: Mrs J C YULE], (1889)
