= Adèle Toussaint-Samson =

French author and poet

- Born: 1820; Paris
- Died: 1911 (aged 84–85)
- Occupation: Writer

Adèle Toussaint-Samson (1826–1911) was a French author and poet. She is the author of A Parisian in Brazil: The Travel Account of a Frenchwoman in Nineteenth-Century Rio de Janeiro. The 124-page book is one of the few first-person accounts by a female visitor to Latin America during this period.

In the mid-1800s, Toussaint-Samson traveled from Paris to Brazil with her husband to improve their family fortune. While in Brazil, Toussaint-Samson wrote A Parisian in Brazil, a portrait of slavery, gender relations, and daily life there. Toussaint-Samson also published several poems and essays.

In 1891, her daughter, Emma Toussaint, translated A Parisian in Brazil into English. In 2003, it was translated into Portuguese by Maria Inez Turazzi as Uma parisiense no Brasil. Rio de Janeiro: Editora Capivara, 2003.

== Bibliography ==
- Toussaint-Samson. Une parisienne au Brésil: avec photographies originales. Paris: P. Ollendorff, 1883. OCLC 8373428
- Toussaint-Samson. A Parisian in Brazil. Boston: J.H. Earle, 1891. Translated by Emma Toussaint
- Toussaint-Samson, and June Edith Hahner. A Parisian in Brazil: The Travel Account of a Frenchwoman in Nineteenth-Century Rio De Janeiro. Wilmington, Del: SR Books, 2001. ISBN 9780842028554
