= Selina Bunbury =

Irish writer

- Born: 1802; Castlebellingham, County Louth
- Died: 1882 (aged 79–80); Cheltenham
- Occupation: Writer

Selina Bunbury (1802–1882) was an Anglo-Irish novelist and traveler.

== Early life ==
Selina Bunbury was born at Kilsaran Rectory near Castlebellingham, County Louth. She was a twin, and one of fifteen children of a Protestant minister, Rev. Henry Bunbury. The Bunbury family moved to Dublin in 1819, and to Liverpool about 1830.

== Career ==
Bunbury was a prolific author, writing nearly a hundred volumes of both fiction and non-fiction, for young readers and a general audience, beginning with Visit to my Birthplace (1821). Her writing had "a strong proselytizing and moral component". "Miss Bunbury is an experienced, an observant, and a discriminating traveller," commented an 1853 reviewer, "with but one fault we can discover — a violent Tractarian tinge, which, however, does not render her book less amusing."

Bunberry traveled from Stockholm to Rome in 1847 and 1848, becoming a first-hand witness to revolution and upheaval in several parts of Europe. Her travel writing included My Early Adventures During the Peninsular Campaign of Napoleon (1834), Evenings in the Pyrenees (1845), A visit to the catacombs, or first Christian cemeteries of Rome, and a midnight visit to mount Vesuvius (1849), Evelyn, or, A journey from Stockholm to Rome in 1847-48 (1849), Life in Sweden (1853), A Summer in Northern Europe (1856), Russia After the War (1857) and My First Travels (1859).

Some of her books continued to be published long after her death in 1882, including American editions of Fanny, the flower girl, or Honesty rewarded (1911).

== Personal life ==
Bunbury kept house for her twin brother until he married in 1845. She died in 1882 at her nephew's home in Cheltenham, aged 80 years.

== Selected works ==
- A Visit to My Birthplace (1821)
- Cabin Conversations and Castle Scenes (1827)
- My Foster Brother (1827)
- Stories from Church History (1828)
- Annot and her Pupil (1829)
- Gertrude and her family (1830)
- My Early Adventures During the Peninsular Campaign of Napoleon (1834)
- The Abbey of Innesmoyle: A Story of Another Century (1839)
- Coombe Abbey: An Historical Tale of the Reign of James the First (1843)
- The Star of the Court, Or, the Maid of Honour and Queen of England, Anne Boleyn (1844)
- The castle and the hovel: or, The two sceptics (1844)
- Evenings in the Pyrenees (1845)
- The Indian Babes in the Wood, taken from fact (1845)
- Glory, Glory, Glory and other narratives (1847)
- Evelyn, or, A journey from Stockholm to Rome in 1847-48 (1849)
- The blind clergyman, and his little guide (1850)
- The brother's sacrifice; A French story (1851)
- Life in Sweden (1853)
- Our Own Story (1856)
- A Summer in Northern Europe (1856)
- Russia After the War (1857)
- Sir Guy d'Esterre (1858)
- My First Travels (1859)
- Madame Constance (1861)
- The violet-seller, or, Honesty and industry (1861)
- Tales (1862)
- Florence Manvers (1865)
- Lady Flora (1870)
