= Gregorio Gutiérrez González =

Colombian poet

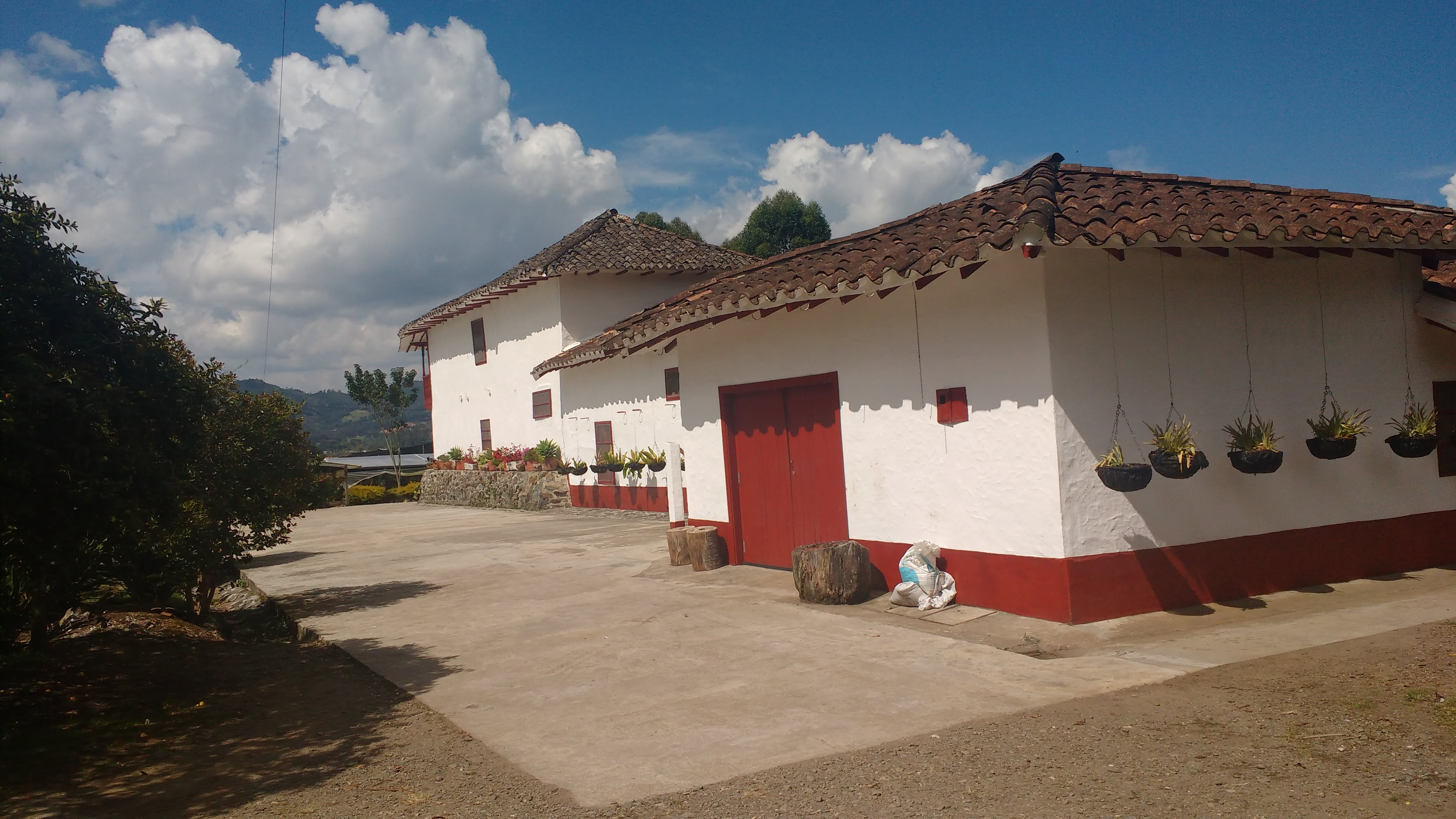
Residence of González

Gregorio Gutiérrez González (1826–1872) was a Colombian poet. He was a son of José Ignacio Guriérrez y Arango and Inés González y Villegas. He was born on 9 May 1826 in La Ceja del Tambo. He learned at schools in Antioquia and Medellín. Then he studied philosophy and law in Bogotá. In 1847, he got doctor degree and was admitted to the bar. He married Juliana Isaza Ruiz who was a sister of the bishop of Bogotá, José Joaquín Isaza. He had many children. Gregorio Gutiérrez González died on 6 July 1873. His most important work is an epic poem Memoria científica sobre el cultivo del Maíz en Antioquia (Memorial on the cultivation of maize in Antioquia).

His house in La Ceja still exists in its original form and in excellent condition. It is quite large as the laborers of the farm that surrounds the house all lived in it. The house has been designated a landmark and cannot be modified. Although it is chock full of furniture and bric-a-brac, two successive owners obviously left a lot of their stuff so it would take an expert antiquarian of quotidian household items to guess which belonged to the poet. The house is unoccupied and available to visit though you would need to make arrangements with the administrator.
