= Herbert Haines (archaeologist) =

British archaeologist (1826–1872)

Herbert Haines (1 September 1826 – 18 September 1872) was an English archaeologist.

== Life ==
Haines, son of John Haines, surgeon, of Hampstead, was born on 1 September 1826. He was educated at the College School, Gloucester, and went to Exeter College, Oxford in 1844, where he proceeded B.A., 1849, M.A. 1851.

In September 1849, Haines was licensed to the curacy of Delamere, Cheshire. On 22 June 1850, he was appointed by the dean and chapter of Gloucester Cathedral to the second Mastership of his old school, the College School, Gloucester. This post he retained till his death, and on two occasions during vacancies in 1853–54 and in 1871 acted for some time as headmaster. In 1854 he was appointed chaplain to the Gloucester County Lunatic Asylum, and in 1859 became also chaplain of the newly opened Barnwood House Asylum near Gloucester.

Haines died, after a short illness, on 18 September 1872, and was buried in the Gloucester cemetery. A monumental brass bearing his effigy was placed in Gloucester Cathedral by friends and old pupils; it was later in the south ambulatory of the choir.

== Works ==
Besides some elementary classical school books, Haines wrote:

1. A Manual for the Study of Monumental Brasses, published under the sanction of the Oxford Architectural Society, Oxford, 1848; 2nd edit., 2 vols. Oxford, 1861.
2. St. Paul a Witness to the Resurrection; a Sermon preached before the Oxford University, Oxford and London, 1867.
3. A Guide to the Cathedral Church in Gloucester, Gloucester and London, 1867; 2nd edit., revised and corrected by F. S. Waller, cathedral architect, 1880; 3rd edit. 1885.
