= Karl Friedrich Stäudlin =

German Protestant theologian

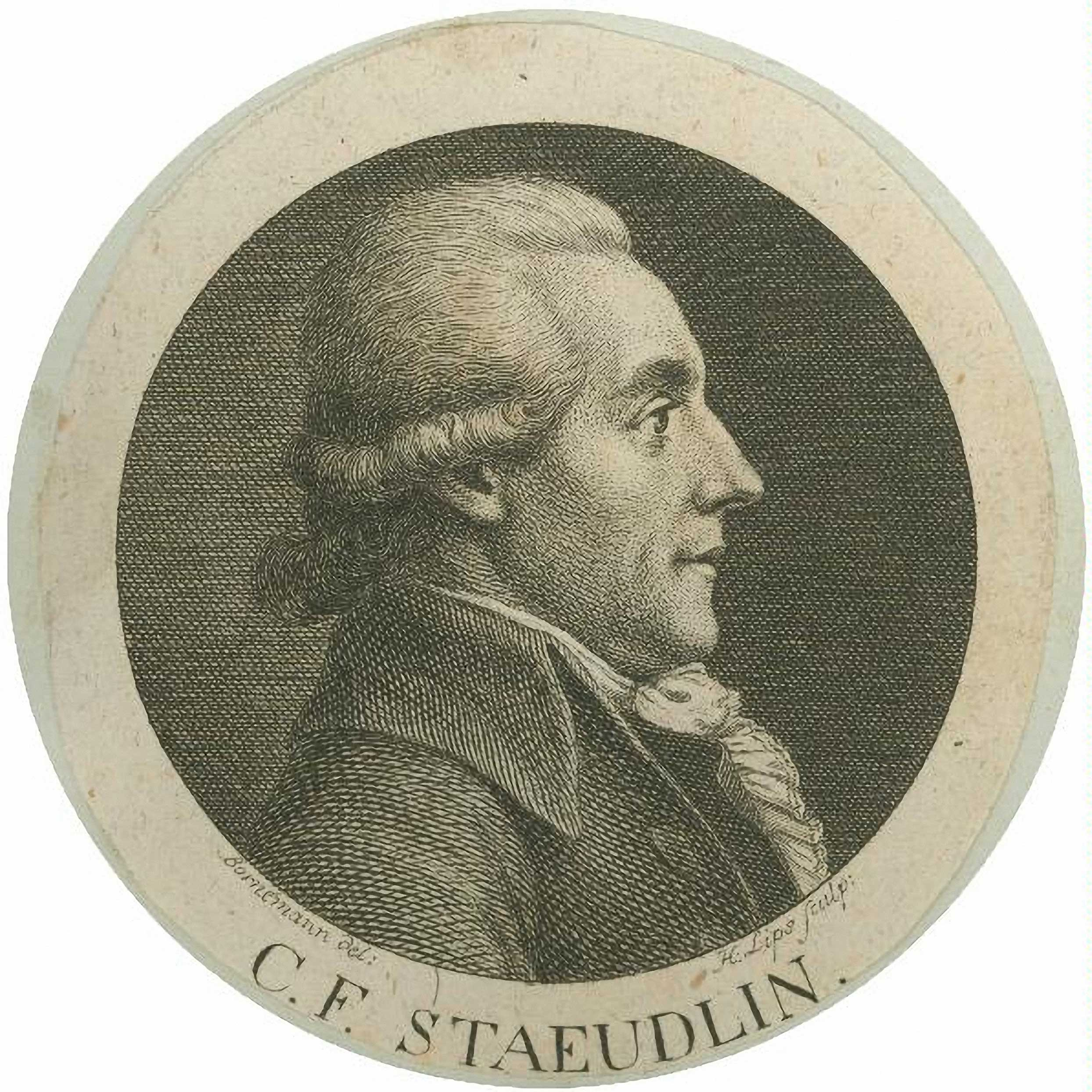
Karl Friedrich Stäudlin

Karl Friedrich Stäudlin (July 25, 1761 – July 5, 1826) was a German Protestant theologian born in Stuttgart.

He studied theology in Tübingen, and from 1790 was a professor of theology at the University of Göttingen, where remained for nearly 36 years. In 1803 he was appointed Consistorialrath.

He was an advocate of "rational Supranaturalism". His writings largely dealt with church history, moral theology and moral philosophy. On the latter subject, he was profoundly influenced by the work of Immanuel Kant.

== Selected publications ==
- Geschichte und Geist des Skeptizismus (History and spirit of skepticism), 1794.
- Kirchliche Geographie und Statistik (Religious history and statistics), 1804.
- Geschichte der philosophie und biblischen Moral (History of philosophy and Biblical morals), 1805.
- Geschichte der christlichen Moral (History of Christian morals), 1808.
- Geschichte der theologischen Wissenschaften (History of theological science), 1810–11.
- Geschichte des Rationalismus und Supernaturalismus (History of rationalism and supranaturalism), 1826.
