= 1879 in literature =

This article contains information about the literary events and publications of 1879.

== Events ==
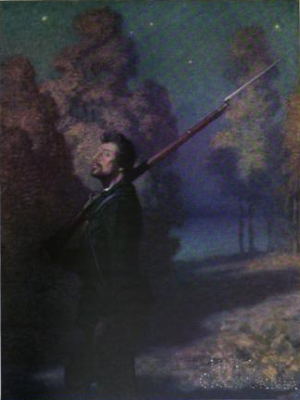
The Picket Guard—N.C. Wyeth, illustration for All Quiet Along the Potomac Tonight.

- January 1 – Benjamin Henry Blackwell opens the first Blackwell's bookshop, in Oxford.
- January 11 – During construction of an extension to Birmingham Central Library in England, a fire destroys 50,000 books and the original manuscript of the Coventry Mystery Plays (including the "Coventry Carol").
- September – The English critic and poet Theodore Watts-Dunton takes the alcoholic poet Algernon Charles Swinburne into permanent care at his Putney home.
- September 6 – Arthur Conan Doyle has his first story, "The Mystery of Sasassa Valley", published anonymously in Chambers's Journal.
- October 10 – The collected works of the American poet Ethel Lynn Beers are published as All Quiet Along The Potomac and Other Poems. The title poem is her best-known work. On the following day she dies aged 52 at Orange, New Jersey.
- December – Walter Besant persuades Thomas Hardy to become a founder-member of The Rabelais Club in London, which holds a literary dinner once every two months. Other members include the novelists Henry James, Bret Harte, Oliver Wendell Holmes and George du Maurier.
- December 21 – The first production of Henrik Ibsen's controversial "modern drama" A Doll's House (Et dukkehjem) takes place at the Royal Danish Theatre in Copenhagen, after publication there on December 4.
- unknown dates
  - Publication of the first complete edition of Georg Büchner's works, edited by Karl Emil Franzos, is completed in Frankfurt. It includes the first printing of the play Wozzeck, left unfinished on the writer's death in 1837.
  - The Swiss publisher Birkhäuser is founded in Basel.

== New books ==
=== Fiction ===
- William Harrison Ainsworth – Beau Nash
- Emilia Pardo Bazán – Pascual López: autobiografía de un estudiante de medicina (Pascual López: Autobiography of a Medical Student)
- Mary Elizabeth Braddon
  - The Cloven Foot
  - Vixen
- Wilkie Collins
  - The Fallen Leaves
  - A Rogue's Life
- Alphonse Daudet – Kings in Exile (Les Rois en Exil)
- Toru Dutt (died 1877) – Le Journal de Mademoiselle d'Arvers
- Silas Hocking – Her Benny
- Joris-Karl Huysmans – Les Soeurs Vatard
- Reinis and Matīss Kaudzīte – Mērnieku laiki (Times of the Land-Surveyors – first novel in Latvian)
- Charles Kickham – Knocknagow, or The Homes of Tipperary
- Pierre Loti – Aziyadé
- George MacDonald - Sir Gibbie
- George Meredith – The Egoist
- John Boyle O'Reilly – Moondyne
- Samuel Vedanayagam Pillai – Prathapa Mudaliar Charithram (The Life of Prathapa Mudaliar, written 1857; first novel in Tamil)
- Shi Yukun (credited) – The Tale of Loyal Heroes and Righteous Gallants (忠烈俠義傳)
- August Strindberg – The Red Room (Roda Rummet)
- Anthony Trollope
  - Cousin Henry
  - The Duke's Children (serialization begins)
  - An Eye for an Eye
  - John Caldigate
- Jules Verne
  - The Begum's Fortune (Les Cinq cents millions de la Bégum)
  - Tribulations of a Chinaman in China (Les Tribulations d'un Chinois en Chine)
- Friedrich Theodor Vischer – Auch einer: eine Reisebekanntschaft

=== Children and young people ===
- Louisa May Alcott – Jack and Jill: A Village Story
- E. W. Cole – Cole's Funny Picture Book
- Evelyn Whitaker – Laddie

=== Drama ===
We must come to a final settlement, Torvald. During eight whole years. . . we have never exchanged one serious word about serious things.

— Nora, in Ibsen's A Doll's House (1879)
- Vasile Alecsandri – Despot-Vodă
- Émile Augier – Les Fourchambault
- Edmond Gondinet – Les Tapageurs
- James Herne – Hearts of Oak
- Henrik Ibsen – A Doll's House
- George Robert Sims – Crutch and Toothpick

=== Poetry ===
- Ethel Lynn Beers – All Quiet Along The Potomac and Other Poems
- Kate Greenaway – Under the Window: Pictures & Rhymes for Children

=== Non-fiction ===
- John Colenso – The Pentateuch and Book of Joshua Critically Examined
- Lewis Carroll – Euclid and his Modern Rivals
- Charles Darwin – The Life of Erasmus Darwin
- Emilia, Lady Dilke (as E. F. S. Pattison) – The Renaissance of Art in France
- Edward Dowden – Southey
- Gottlob Frege – Begriffsschrift (Concept Writing)
- Henry George – Progress and Poverty
- Agnes Giberne – Sun, Moon and Stars: Astronomy for Beginners
- George Grove (ed.) – A Dictionary of Music and Musicians, 1st edition begins publication
- Yngvar Nielsen – Reisehaandbog over Norge (Travel Manual to Norway)
- Robert Louis Stevenson – Travels with a Donkey in the Cévennes

== Births ==
- January 1 – E. M. Forster, English novelist and critic (died 1970)
- January 26 – Alfred Eckhard Zimmern, German-born English historian and political scientist (died 1957)
- February 2 – I. C. Vissarion, Romanian novelist, dramatist, poet and science writer (died 1951)
- February 13 – Sarojini Naidu (née Chattopadhyay), Indian poet and politician (died 1949)
- February 17 – Dorothy Canfield Fisher, American activist and novelist (died 1958)
- March 9 – Agnes Miegel, German author, journalist and poet (died 1964)
- March 14 – Harold Monro, English poet and promoter of poetry (died 1932)
- March 28 – Terence MacSwiney, Irish playwright, poet and politician (died on hunger strike 1920)
- April 14 – James Branch Cabell, American novelist (died 1958)
- May 8 – Ioan C. Filitti, Romanian historian, political theorist and essayist (died 1945)
- June 4 – Percy Lubbock, English essayist, critic and biographer (died 1965)
- July 19 – Ferenc Móra, Hungarian children's writer and editor (died 1934)
- July 20 – Claude Scudamore Jarvis, English writer, Arabist and naturalist (died 1953)
- August 19 – Lascăr Vorel, Romanian visual artist and short story writer (died 1918)
- September 19 – Louis Joseph Vance, American novelist (died 1933)
- October 2 – Wallace Stevens, American poet (died 1955)
- November 19 – Mait Metsanurk, Estonian author and playwright (died 1957)
- November 26 – Belle da Costa Greene, born Belle Marion Greener, American librarian (died 1950)
- December 3 – Kafū Nagai (永井 荷風), Japanese novelist (died 1959)
- December 24 – Émile Nelligan, French Canadian poet (died 1941)

== Deaths ==
- January 16 – Octave Crémazie, "the father of French Canadian poetry" (born 1827)
- February 28 – Hortense Allart, French feminist novelist (born 1801)
- March 3
  - William Howitt, English historical writer and poet (born 1792)
  - Annie Keary, English novelist, poet and children's writer (born 1825)
- March 9 – Mark Prager Lindo, Dutch historian (born 1819)
- March 19 – Claire Clairmont, English-born diarist and correspondent (born 1798)
- April 8 – Anthony Panizzi, Italian-born English librarian (born 1797)
- April 21 – George Hadfield, English radical author and politician (born 1787)
- April 25 – Charles Tennyson Turner, English poet (born 1808)
- April 30 – Sarah Josepha Hale, American novelist and poet (born 1788)
- June 1 – Louisa Caroline Huggins Tuthill, American children's author (born 1799)
- June 3 – Frances Ridley Havergal, English religious poet (born 1836)
- June 19 – George W. M. Reynolds, English popular novelist (born 1814)
- July 4 – Sarah Dorsey, American novelist and historian (born 1829)
- July 30 – Aasmund Olavsson Vinje, Norwegian poet and journalist (born 1818)
- September 20 – Rosanna Eleanor Leprohon, Canadian novelist and poet (born 1829)
- September 23 – Francis Kilvert, English diarist and cleric (born 1840)
- October 11 – Ethel Lynn Beers, American poet (born 1827)
- October 13 – Henry Charles Carey, American economist (born 1793)
- October 28 – Marie Roch Louis Reybaud, French political economist (born 1799)
- October 31
  - Jacob Abbott, American children's writer (born 1803)
  - John Baldwin Buckstone, English dramatist (born 1802)
- November 23 – Louisa Susannah Cheves McCord, American political essayist (born 1810)
- December 27 – William Hepworth Dixon, English historian, traveller and journal editor (born 1821)

== Awards ==
- Newdigate Prize – Thomas Mosse Macdonald

== Sources ==
- Matthews, Bander (ed.); N.C. Wyeth (illus.) Poems of American Patriotism. New York: Charles Scribner's Sons (1922).
