= Bearss =

Bearss is a surname. Notable people with the surname include:

- A. C. Bearss, American politician
- Briar Bearss, American politician
- Ed Bearss, (1923–2020), United States Marine Corps veteran, military historian and writer
- Hiram I. Bearss (1875–1938), United States Marine Corps officer and Medal of Honor recipient

== See also ==
- Bearss lime, a citrus fruit species of hybrid origin
- USS Bearss (DD-654), a Fletcher-class destroyer
