= 1879 in poetry =

This article covers 1879 in poetry. Nationality words link to articles with information on the nation's poetry or literature (for instance, Irish or France).

== Events ==
- October 10 – American poet Ethel Lynn Beers' collected works "All Quiet Along The Potomac" and Other Poems (including her most well-known work "All Quiet Along the Potomac Tonight") are published; the following day she dies aged 52 at Orange, New Jersey.
- Critic and poet Theodore Watts-Dunton takes the alcoholic poet Algernon Charles Swinburne into his permanent care at Watts' Putney home.

== Works published in English ==
=== United Kingdom ===
- Edwin Arnold, The Light of Asia; or, The Great Renunciation (see also The Light of the World 1891)
- Louisa Sarah Bevington, Key-Notes
- Robert Bridges, Poems (see also Poems 1873, 1880)
- Robert Browning, Dramatic Idyls, including "Ivàn Ivànovitch" (see also dramatic Idyls 1880)
- Edmund Gosse, New Poems
- Kate Greenaway, Under the Window: Pictures & Rhymes for Children
- Emily Pfeiffer, Quarterman's Grace, and Other Poems
- Alfred Lord Tennyson, The Lover's Tale

=== United States ===
- Ethel Lynn Beers, All Quiet Along the Potomac and Other Poems
- Oliver Wendell Holmes, The School-Boy
- Edmund Clarence Stedman, Lyrics and Idylls, with Other Poems
- Celia Thaxter, Drift-Weed

== Works published in other languages ==
- Marcellus Emants, "Lilith", Netherlands
- Louis-Honoré Fréchette, Fleurs boréales, winner of the Prix Montyon of the French Academy; French language; Quebec, Canada
- José Hernández, Martin Fierro, the second part of an epic Spanish-language Argentine poem in which the hero defends his way of life against encroaching socialization and civilization; an example of the Gaucho poetry literary movement in Argentina (see also first part 1872)
- Victor Hugo, L'Art d'être grand-père, France
- Stéphane Mallarmé, Les Dieux antiques, France

== Births ==
Death years link to the corresponding "[year] in poetry" article:

- February 13 – Sarojini Naidu (died 1949) also known by the sobriquet Bharatiya Kokila ("The Nightingale of India"), poet (in English) and elected official who was president of the Indian National Congress and the first woman governor of Uttar Pradesh
- March 14 – Harold Monro (died 1932), English poet, proprietor of the Poetry Bookshop in London
- March 26 – Joseph Campbell (died 1987), Irish
- March 28 – Terence MacSwiney (died on hunger strike 1920), Irish playwright, poet and politician
- April 3 – Takashi Nagatsuka 長塚 節 (died 1915), Japanese poet and novelist
- April 14 – James Branch Cabell (died 1958), American writer
- May 10 – James Alexander Allan (died 1967), Australian poet and local historian
- June 21 – Leslie Holdsworth Allen (died 1964), Australian
- September 13 – James Larkin Pearson (died 1981), American poet, newspaper publisher; North Carolina Poet Laureate, 1953–1981
- October 2 – Wallace Stevens (died 1955), American
- October 13 – Patrick Joseph Hartigan (died 1952), Australian
- November 10 – Vachel Lindsay (died 1931), American
- December 18 – Paul Klee (died 1940), Swiss painter and poet of German nationality

== Deaths ==
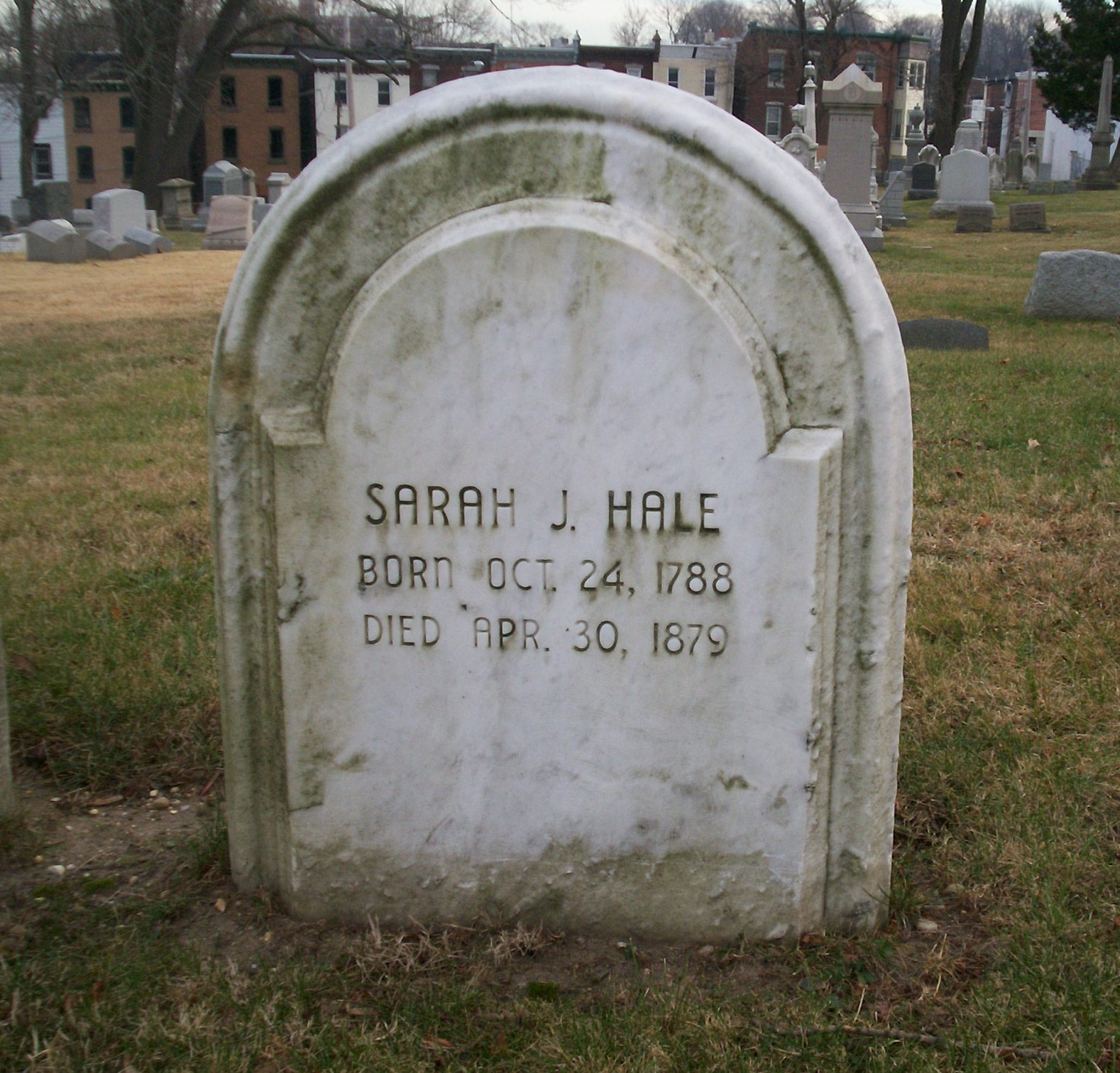
Grave of Sarah Josepha Hale in Philadelphia

Death years link to the corresponding "[year] in poetry" article:

- February 2 – Richard Henry Dana Sr. (born 1787), American poet, critic and lawyer
- April 30 – Sarah Josepha Hale (born 1788), American writer and poet, author of the popular nursery rhyme "Mary Had a Little Lamb" and successful promoter of Thanksgiving Day as a national holiday
- August 21 – Frances Browne (born 1816), Irish novelist, short-story writer and poet
- September 20 – Rosanna Eleanor Leprohon (born 1829), Canadian novelist and poet
- October 11 – Ethel Lynn Beers (born 1827), American poet
- November 5 – James Clerk Maxwell (born 1831), Scottish mathematician and theoretical physicist
- date not known
  - Chō Kōran (born 1804), female Japanese poet and nanga artist
  - Aristotelis Valaoritis (born 1824), Greek poet

== See also ==
- 19th century in poetry
- 19th century in literature
- List of years in poetry
- List of years in literature
- Victorian literature
- French literature of the 19th century
- Poetry
