= Senator Mullan =

Senator Mullan may refer to:

- Charles W. Mullan (1845–1919), Iowa State Senate
- John B. Mullan (1863–1955), New York State Senate

== See also ==
- Robert Mullen (Nevada politician) (fl. 1860s–1870s), Nevada State Senate
- Senator Mullin (disambiguation)
