= Harry Creswell =

Harry Creswell may refer to:

- Harry T. Creswell (1850–1914), American lawyer and state senator
- Harry Bulkeley Creswell (1869–1960), British architect and author
