= Senator Proctor (disambiguation) =

Redfield Proctor (1831–1908) was a U.S. Senator for Vermont from 1891 to 1908. Senator Proctor may also refer to:

- Fletcher D. Proctor (1860–1911), Vermont State Senate
- Frank M. Proctor (died 1892), Nevada State Senate
- Haydn Proctor (1903–1996), New Jersey State Senate
- John E. Proctor (1844–1944), Florida State Senate
- Mortimer R. Proctor (1889–1968), Vermont State Senate
- Redfield Proctor Jr. (1879–1957), Vermont State Senate
