= Senator Walters (disambiguation) =

Herbert S. Walters (1891–1973) was a U.S. Senator from Tennessee from 1963 to 1964. Senator Walters may also refer to:

- Bill Walters (Arkansas politician) (1943–2013), Arkansas State Senate
- Chris Walters (born 1986), West Virginia State Senate
- J. Henry Walters (1874–1952), New York State Senate
- Mack Walters (1916–1973), Kentucky State Senate
- Michael P. Walters (born 1956), North Carolina State Senate
- Mimi Walters (born 1962), California State Senate

== See also ==
- D. P. Walter (fl. 1870s), Nevada State Senate
