= Whistling Dick =

Whistling Dick may refer to

- Whistling Dick (cannon), a Confederate cannon used at the Siege of Vicksburg
- Whistling Dick (mortar), a 15-inch Russian mortar used at the Battle of Malakoff
- Richard Milburn, musician who composed the whistling tune, "Listen to the Mocking Bird"
