= Sætren =

Sætren is a surname. Notable people with the surname include:

- Egil Sætren (1894–1964), Norwegian actor
- Gunnar Sætren
