= Robert Mullen =

Robert Mullen may refer to:

- Robert Mullen (Nevada politician) (fl. 1868–1872), member of the Nevada Senate
- Robert S. Mullen (1884–1959), American lawyer and politician from New York
- Robert R. Mullen, founder of public relations company Robert Mullen Company

== See also ==
- Robert N. Mullin (1893–1982), writer of Western history
- Robert Mullan (1947–2024), British film director, writer and producer
