= Reisehaandbog over Norge =

1879 book by Yngvar Nielsen

Reisehaandbog over Norge is a Norwegian travel guide book first published in 1879 by Yngvar Nielsen. It was re-issued in twelve different editions between 1879 and 1915. The guide book became quite popular, and played an important role in the development of tourism in Norway. An English edition of the guide book was published in 1886.

== Authorship ==
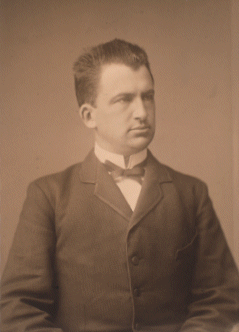
Yngvar Nielsen.

The author of the travel guide was geographer, historian, and politician Yngvar Nielsen. He was an eager hiker, and made long journeys in Norway every year. He was a board member of the Norwegian Trekking Association from 1879, and chaired the organization for 18 years, from 1890 to 1908. As a young boy Nielsen travelled along with his father, Carsten Tank Nielsen, who was in charge of the development of a telegraph infrastructure in Norway. He crossed the Jostedalsbreen by foot in 1864, from Jostedalen to Stryn; this visit sparked his interest for the glacier, the surrounding districts, and tourism. Nielsen travelled all over the country, and became familiar with various aspects of travelling. In 1873, he was offered the opportunity to write a travel guide to Norway, which was issued in German as Norwegen. Ein praktisches Handbuch für Reisende, published in Hamburg in 1874.

== Contents ==
The original 1879 edition of Reisehaandbog over Norge, had 234 pages, while the tenth edition, from 1903, had 554 pages. The guide book covered themes such as transport, lodging, prices, mountain passages, distances, glacier walks, and historical and cultural overviews. From the 11th edition (1908) the book was split geographically into four parts, called: I. Søndenfjeldske, II. Østenfjeldske, III. Vestenfjeldske, and IV. Nordenfjeldske. Among the map suppliers for the book were topographer and military officer Kristen Gran Gleditsch and engineer Gunnar Sætren.
