= Paris M. Ellison =

American politician

Member of the Nevada Assembly from the Nye County district
- In office November 4, 1874 – November 7, 1876 Serving with John B. McGee
- Preceded by: John Bowman and H. G. Prague
- Succeeded by: Thomas J. Bell and J. A. Caldwell

County Commissioner of Nye County, Nevada
- In office 1872 – September 27, 1873

Personal details
- Born: April 2, 1837 Boone County, Missouri
- Died: February 11, 1912 (aged 74) Crescent, Oklahoma
- Party: Democratic Party

Paris M. Ellison was an American politician in Nevada.

== Early life ==
Paris M. Ellison was born on April 2, 1837, in Boone County, Missouri.

== Nevada career ==
He became one of the three county commissioners of Nye County after he was elected to that office on November 5, 1872. Ellison resigned a year later, and was replaced by Joseph Stowe. He was elected to the Assembly, where he represented Nye County alongside John B. McGee, on November 3, 1874 as a Democrat.

Ellison's term started the next day, and he served during one session. His mandate ended in November 1876, when Ellison and McGee were succeeded by Thomas J. Bell and J. A. Caldwell.

== Death ==
Ellison died on February 11, 1912, at the age of 74 in Crescent, Oklahoma.
