= John B. McGee =

American politician

Member of the Nevada Assembly from the Nye County district
- In office November 4, 1874 – November 7, 1876 Serving with P. M. Ellison
- Preceded by: John Bowman and H. G. Prague
- Succeeded by: Thomas J. Bell and J. M. Caldwell

Personal details
- Party: Democratic Party

John B. McGee was an American politician.

As a Democrat, he was elected to Nevada Assembly on November 3, 1874, and represented Nye County together with P. M. Ellison. McGee's term started the following day. He attended the 7th session of the Nevada Legislature, that began on January 4, 1875. McGee was present on about half of the session days. On the first day of the session, he was nominated for Speaker of the Assembly by James C. Dow. He received 15 votes, but lost to Republican W. C. Dovey, who was given 29 votes in the Republican-held Assembly. While in the Assembly, McGee introduced one joint resolution on January 29. It passed the Assembly with only one nay, and it subsequently passed the Senate without any on February 2. The joint resolution requested the Post Office Department to change the mail route between Eureka and Belmont to include Tybo as well. McGee's term ended after the next elections in November 1876.

According to the session records, McGee resided in Tybo during his term as assemblyman.

== Standing committees ==
During his term, McGee was appointed to two standing committees:

- Committee on Ways and Means (appointed on January 5, 1875)
- Committee on Trade and Manufactures (appointed on January 9, 1875)
