= Joseph T. Williams =

American politician

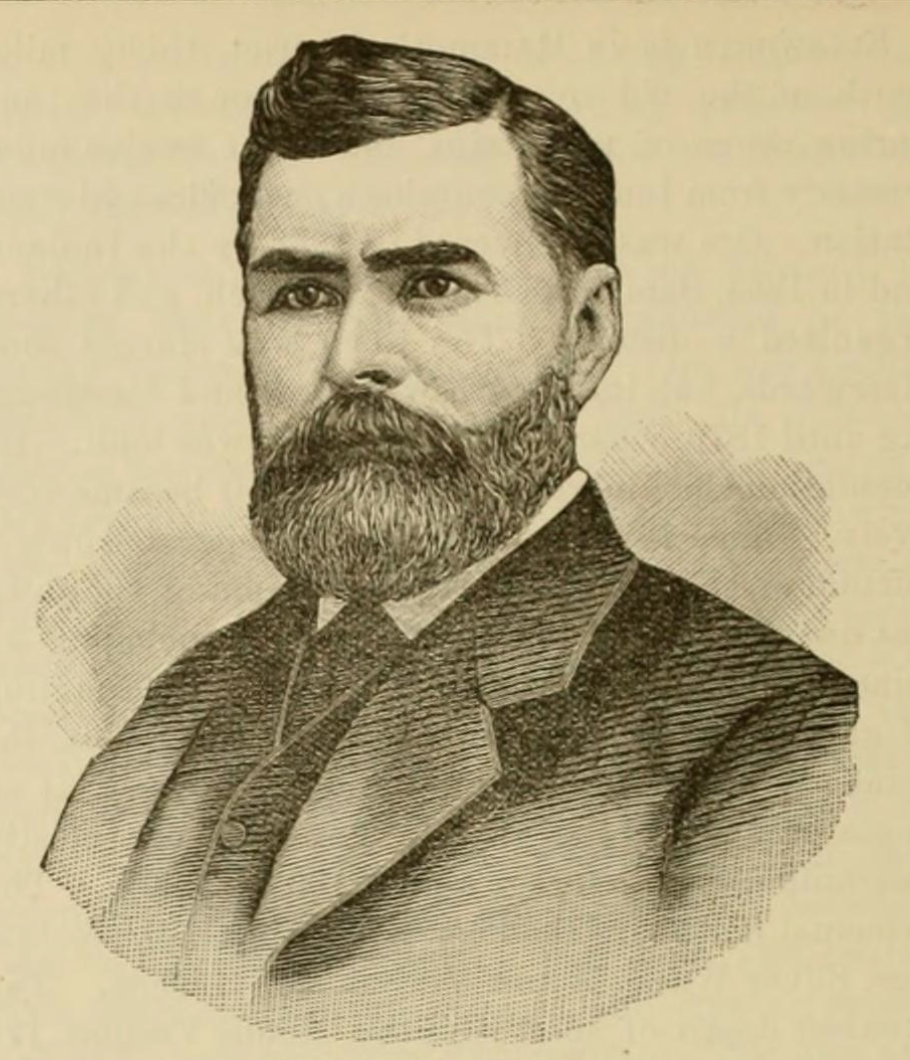
- Image of Williams in the book History of Nevada (1881)

Member of the Nevada Senate from the Nye County district
- In office November 3, 1880 – November 4, 1884
- Preceded by: Harry T. Creswell
- Succeeded by: Andrew Maute

Member of the Nevada Assembly from the Nye County district
- In office November 6, 1878 – November 2, 1880 Serving with W. B. Taylor
- Preceded by: Thomas J. Bell and J. A. Caldwell
- Succeeded by: Thomas J. Bell and George Ernst

Personal details
- Born: July 21, 1842 Conway, Arkansas, U.S.
- Died: 1910 (aged 67–68)
- Party: Democratic Party
- Spouse: Sophia Ernst

Joseph T. Williams (July 21, 1842 – 1910) was a Democratic assemblyman and state senator. He was a supporter of the Jacksonian democracy.

Williams was born in 1842 in Conway, Arkansas as the son of a planter. The ancestors of his father originated in Wales and the ancestors of his mother in France. His father died when Williams was young. He moved to Calaveras County, California at age seventeen by crossing the Great Plains. He didn't know any people over there and started working in the mining business. In 1862, he moved to Nevada Territory and became a silver miner. Williams went with Governor Lewis R. Bradley to Austin, Nevada the next year during the Reese River excitement. He helped with organizing Nye County, Nevada and resided in the county since then. In September 1870, Williams married Sophie Ernst.

On November 5, 1878, he was elected member of the Nevada Assembly, where he and W. B. Taylor represented Nye County. Williams' term started the next day and ended after the elections of 1880.

At those elections, he was elected Nevada State Senator and succeeded Harry T. Creswell. Williams represented Nye County during two regular sessions until his mandate ended in November 1884. One of his most important accomplishments was the Williams Resolution of 1881, that he authored. This resolution regulated the freights and fares of the railroads in Nevada. In 1882, when he was a senator, he was thought to be a possible candidate for Governor of Nevada, but he denied these claims. The Belmont Courier called him "undoubtedly a very strong and popular man".

The book History of Nevada (1881) stated that back then Williams was in the mining business and owned some mining claims, a hotel, and 500 acres of land, where he made hay. At that time, he lived in Hot Creek, now a Nevada ghost town. In February 1890, Williams became a charter member of the Board of Trade of Nye County.
