= John G. Prague =

American politician affiliated with the Republican Party

H. G. Prague

Member of the Nevada Assembly from the Nye County district
- In office November 6, 1872 – November 3, 1874 Serving with John Bowman
- Preceded by: John Bowman and A. H. Greenhalgh
- Succeeded by: John B. McGee and P. M. Ellison

Personal details
- Party: Republican

John G. Prague (also called H. G. Prague and J. A. Prague) was an American politician affiliated with the Republican Party. On November 5, 1872, he was elected member of the Nevada Assembly, where he represented Nye County with John Bowman. Prague's term started the following day and he served in one regular session. Records from that session stated that Prague lived in Twin River. His mandate ended in November 1874. Prague and Bowman were succeeded by John B. McGee and P. M. Ellison.

In 1875, he became postmaster of the post office in Twin River.
