= James M. Groves =

American politician

Member of the Nevada Assembly from the Nye County district
- In office November 7, 1866 – November 3, 1868 Serving with W. T. Jones
- Preceded by: A. C. Bearss
- Succeeded by: William Doolin and John Bowman

Personal details
- Party: National Union Party

James M. Groves was an American politician. As a Unionist, he was elected member of the Nevada Assembly on November 6, 1866, where he and W. T. Jones represented Nye County. Groves' term started the next day and he served in one regular and one special session. His term ended in November 1868. Groves and Jones were succeeded by William Doolin and John Bowman.
