= Lacy Banks =

American sportswriter (1943–2012)

Lacy J. Banks (August 11, 1943 – March 21, 2012) was an American sportswriter who worked for the Chicago Sun-Times from 1972 until his death. The newspaper's first African-American sportswriter, Banks covered the National Basketball Association and the Chicago Bulls.

A native of Lyon, Mississippi, Banks studied French at the University of Kansas and served in the United States Navy during the Vietnam War. In addition to his writings on basketball, he co-authored the book Winning Boxing (1980).

He died at age 68 in 2012 after suffering from prostate cancer, a brain tumor, and heart disease in his later years. He and his wife, Joyce, were married 43 years, with three daughters and five grandchildren.
