= A. H. Greenhalgh =

Nevada politician

Member of the Nevada Assembly from the Nye County district
- In office November 9, 1870 – November 5, 1872 Serving with John Bowman
- Preceded by: William Doolin and John Bowman
- Succeeded by: H. G. Prague and John Bowman

Personal details
- Party: Democratic Party

A. H. Greenhalgh was an American politician affiliated with the Democratic Party. On November 8, 1870, he was elected representative of Nye County in the Nevada Assembly with John Bowman. Greenhalgh's term started the following day and he served in one regular session. Records from the session stated that he resided in Twin River. Greenhalgh's mandate ended after the next elections, that were held in November 1872. At those elections, John Bowman and H. G. Prague were elected the Nye County representatives in the Assembly.

In May 1889, Greenhalgh was appointed one of the eight trustees of agricultural district no. 6, that contained Nye County and Lander County, by Governor Charles C. Stevenson. One year later, at the 1890 Nye County Democratic Convention, it was decided that Greenhalgh and Thomas J. Bell would be the Democratic candidates for the two Nye County representatives in the Nevada Assembly. At the elections that year, Greenhalgh was defeated and Thomas J. Bell and Republican A. A. Wager were elected assemblymen.
