= John Bowman (Nevada politician) =

American politician (1824–1899)

Member of the Nevada Assembly from the Nye County district
- In office November 4, 1868 – November 3, 1874 Serving with William Doolin (1868-1870), A. H. Greenhalgh (1870-1872), and H. G. Prague (1872-1874)
- Preceded by: James M. Groves and W. T. Jones
- Succeeded by: John B. McGee and P. M. Ellison

Personal details
- Born: 1824/1825 Tennessee
- Died: July 26, 1899 (aged 74)
- Party: National Union Party (1868-1870); Republican Party (from 1870 on)
- Children: Edward (son) and Frank Hall (daughter)
- Profession: Lawyer

John Bowman (1824 or 1825 – July 26, 1899) was an American lawyer, assemblyman in Nevada, and Speaker of the Assembly.

== Biography ==
He was born in 1824 or 1825 in Tennessee. Bowman moved from Illinois to California in 1854 and lived most of the time in El Dorado County. At the beginning of the 1860s, he moved to Washoe City in the Nevada Territory. Bowman was among the first settlers of Austin and Belmont.

On November 3, 1868, Bowman was elected representative of Nye County in the Nevada Assembly. As a Unionist, he served with William Doolin and his term started the next day. In November 1870, Bowman was re-elected and this term he served together with A. H. Greenhalgh. From the 1870 election on, he served as a Republican instead of as a Unionist. Bowman was the Republican nominee for Speaker of the Assembly of the 1871 regular session, but the Assembly, that had a Democratic majority, voted 24 to 20 in support of his competitor, Democrat Robert E. Lowery.

At the November 1872 elections, Bowman was re-elected once more and served that term with H. G. Prague. During the 1873 regular session, he was chosen Speaker of the Assembly. His third and final term ended in November 1874. Bowman had served a total of three regular sessions. At the 1874 elections, he was the Republican candidate for Lieutenant Governor of Nevada, but he was defeated by his opponent, Democrat Jewett W. Adams. Bowman received 7,930 votes (44%).

In 1877, he moved from Belmont to Reno, where he would live until his death. On November 5 of the next year, Bowman was elected district attorney of Washoe County. He served as district attorney for two years. Bowman died on July 26, 1899, after having been sick for two months. He had suffered from asthma for several years. Bowman had a wife and two children (one son and one daughter) and he had been a member of the Odd Fellows.
