= Lyon, Mississippi =

- Town
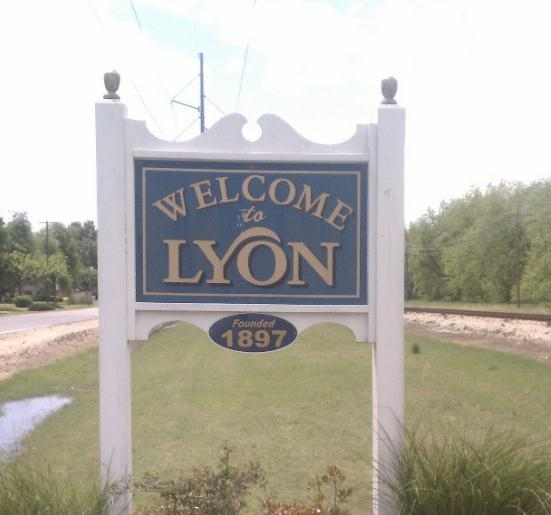

- Location of Lyon, Mississippi

- Location in the United States
- Coordinates: 34°13′01″N 90°32′36″W
- Country: United States
- State: Mississippi
- County: Coahoma

Area
  - Total: 0.48 sq mi (1.25 km^{2})
  - Land: 0.48 sq mi (1.25 km^{2})
  - Water: 0 sq mi (0.00 km^{2})
- Elevation: 174 ft (53 m)

Population (2020)
  - Total: 296
  - Density: 614.2/sq mi (237.14/km^{2})
- Time zone: UTC-6 (Central (CST))
  - Summer (DST): UTC-5 (CDT)
- ZIP code: 38645
- Area code: 662
- FIPS code: 28-42960
- GNIS feature ID: 2406068

Lyon is a town in Coahoma County, Mississippi, United States. Per the 2020 census, the population was 296.

== History ==
The town is named after the French city of Lyon, Auvergne-Rhône-Alpes.

== Geography ==
Lyon is located in east-central Coahoma County. It is bordered to the west and south by the city of Clarksdale, the county seat.

According to the United States Census Bureau, the town has a total area of 0.46 square miles (1.2 km^{2}), all land.

== Demographics ==
Historical population
| Census | Pop. | Note | %± |
|---|---|---|---|
| 1900 | 166 | | — |
| 1910 | 223 | | 34.3% |
| 1920 | 277 | | 24.2% |
| 1930 | 295 | | 6.5% |
| 1940 | 339 | | 14.9% |
| 1950 | 386 | | 13.9% |
| 1960 | 393 | | 1.8% |
| 1970 | 383 | | −2.5% |
| 1980 | 428 | | 11.7% |
| 1990 | 446 | | 4.2% |
| 2000 | 418 | | −6.3% |
| 2010 | 350 | | −16.3% |
| 2020 | 296 | | −15.4% |
U.S. Decennial Census; 2010 2020

=== 2020 census ===
Lyon town, Mississippi – Racial and ethnic composition Note: the US Census treats Hispanic/Latino as an ethnic category. This table excludes Latinos from the racial categories and assigns them to a separate category. Hispanics/Latinos may be of any race.
| Race / Ethnicity (NH = Non-Hispanic) | Pop 2010 | Pop 2020 | % 2010 | % 2020 |
|---|---|---|---|---|
| White alone (NH) | 281 | 221 | 80.29% | 74.66% |
| Black or African American alone (NH) | 66 | 56 | 18.86% | 18.92% |
| Native American or Alaska Native alone (NH) | 0 | 1 | 0.00% | 0.00% |
| Asian alone (NH) | 0 | 0 | 0.00% | 0.00% |
| Pacific Islander alone (NH) | 0 | 0 | 0.00% | 0.00% |
| Some Other Race alone (NH) | 0 | 1 | 0.00% | 0.34% |
| Mixed Race or Multi-Racial (NH) | 0 | 9 | 0.00% | 3.04% |
| Hispanic or Latino (any race) | 3 | 9 | 0.86% | 3.04% |
| Total | 350 | 296 | 100.00% | 100.00% |

=== 2000 Census ===
As of the census of 2000, there were 418 people, 170 households, and 121 families residing in the town. The population density was 897.0 inhabitants per square mile (346.3/km^{2}). There were 177 housing units at an average density of 379.8 per square mile (146.6/km^{2}). The racial makeup of the town was 74.40% White, 25.12% African American and 0.48% Asian.

There were 170 households, out of which 32.9% had children under the age of 18 living with them, 57.6% were married couples living together, 11.8% had a female householder with no husband present, and 28.8% were non-families. 28.2% of all households were made up of individuals, and 14.1% had someone living alone who was 65 years of age or older. The average household size was 2.45 and the average family size was 3.00.

In the town, the population was spread out, with 23.4% under the age of 18, 8.9% from 18 to 24, 26.3% from 25 to 44, 23.9% from 45 to 64, and 17.5% who were 65 years of age or older. The median age was 41 years. For every 100 females, there were 95.3 males. For every 100 females age 18 and over, there were 91.6 males.

The median income for a household in the town was $34,375, and the median income for a family was $56,042. Males had a median income of $43,750 versus $23,611 for females. The per capita income for the town was $20,646. About 15.0% of families and 21.0% of the population were below the poverty line, including 36.9% of those under age 18 and 4.7% of those age 65 or over.

== Education ==
The town of Lyon is served by the Coahoma County School District. Residents are served by Lyon Elementary School and Coahoma County Junior-Senior High School.

== In popular culture ==
Tennessee Williams grew up in neighboring Clarksdale and referred to the town in his poem The Couple:

I saw them often when they drove to Lyons,
a ghostly pair perched on a wooden scaffold.

== Notable people ==
- Lacy Banks, sportswriter for the Chicago Sun-Times
- Lamar Fontaine, veteran of the Mexican–American War and the American Civil War; surveyor, poet and author.
- Son House, blues singer and guitarist
- Charles Mitchell, professional football player
