= Senator Mullin =

Senator Mullin may refer to:

- Joseph Mullin (state senator) (1848–1897), New York State Senate
- Kevin J. Mullin (born 1958), Vermont State Senate
- Markwayne Mullin (born 1977), U.S. Senator from Oklahoma

== See also ==
- Senator Mullan (disambiguation)
