= J. A. Caldwell =

American politician

Member of the Nevada Assembly from the Nye County district
- In office November 8, 1876 – November 5, 1878 Serving with Thomas J. Bell
- Preceded by: John B. McGee and P. M. Ellison
- Succeeded by: W.B. Taylor and Joseph T. Williams

Sheriff of Nye County
- In office 1872–1876
- Preceded by: Robert Stein
- Succeeded by: W.H. Huyck

Personal details
- Party: Democratic

J. A. Caldwell was an American politician and county sheriff. A Democrat, he served in the Nevada Assembly between 1876 and 1878.

Caldwell became sheriff of Nye County after he was elected to that office on November 5, 1872. He was re-elected after his first term ended, and served until the elections on November 7, 1876. During those elections, Caldwell was elected as one of the two representatives of Nye County in the Assembly. The other representative was Thomas J. Bell.

Caldwell's term started the next day, and he served in one session. His mandate ended in November 1878 following the next elections, where W.B. Taylor and Joseph T. Williams were chosen as Caldwell and Bell's successors.
