= W. T. Jones =

American politician who was a member of the National Union Party

Member of the Nevada Assembly from the Nye County district
- In office November 7, 1866 – November 3, 1868 Serving with James M. Groves
- Preceded by: A. C. Bearss
- Succeeded by: William Doolin and John Bowman

Personal details
- Party: National Union Party

W. T. Jones was an American politician who was a member of the National Union Party. On November 7, 1866, he was elected representative of Nye County in the Nevada Assembly alongside James M. Groves. Jones' term started the next day. He served in one regular and one special session and his mandate ended after the next election, that was held in November 1868. Jones and Groves were succeeded by William Doolin and John Bowman.
