= William Doolin =

American politician

Member of the Nevada Assembly from the Nye County district
- In office November 4, 1868 – November 8, 1870 Serving with John Bowman
- Preceded by: James M. Groves and W. T. Jones
- Succeeded by: A. H. Greenhalgh and John Bowman

Personal details
- Party: National Union Party

William Doolin was an American politician. As a Unionist, he was elected member of the Nevada Assembly on November 4, 1868 and together with John Bowman he represented Nye County in the lower house. Doolin's term started the following day and he served in one regular session. His term ended after the next election, at which A. H. Greenhalgh and John Bowman were elected representatives of Nye County in the Assembly.
