= Edward William Cole =

Australian bookseller (1832–1918)

- Edward William Cole outside his home Earlsbrae Hall in Essendon, Victoria, Australia.
- Born: Edward William Cole; 4 January 1832; Woodchurch, U.K.
- Died: 16 December 1918 (aged 86); Melbourne, Victoria, Australia
- Occupations: bookseller, author, editor

Edward William Cole, also known as "E. W. Cole of the Book Arcade", (4 January 1832 – 16 December 1918) was a bookseller and founder of the Cole's Book Arcade, Melbourne, Victoria, Australia.

== Early life ==
Cole was born at Woodchurch, Kent, England, to Harriet Cole, on 4 January 1832. Harriet's husband, Amos Cole, was on the hulks in Plymouth at the time of Edward's conception and therefore Amos could not be Edward's father, whose identity remains unknown. Harriet herself was both illegitimate and illiterate. Cole received little formal education and he himself confirmed that "he had as a boy only six months' schooling."

When Cole was four, despite no record of a divorce, his mother Harriet married again to Thomas Watson, on 27 February 1836, just two months before Amos was transported to Van Diemen's Land on 24 April, 1836. Aged 18, Cole moved to London in 1850 with £20. On 14 April 1850, he migrated to the Cape Colony aboard the 'Dalhousie' and had some success as a farmer and enjoyed botanical explorations. On November 11, 1852 Cole arrived at Cole's Wharf (no relation) in Melbourne, Victoria.

== Bookseller ==
With the pending redevelopment of the Eastern Market, in December 1873 Cole moved to a building a little further down Bourke Street, and opened a book shop grandly named "Coles Book Arcade", where his flair for publicity made it a success. Meanwhile, the new Eastern Market had opened in 1879, but it was not a success, most vendors finding better conditions and lower rents at the Queen Victoria Market. Cole offered to rent the whole of the market in 1881, to which the City of Melbourne agreed. He marketed it as a leisure centre rather than a place to buy fresh food, a model which proved a success. After one year, Council did not renew the lease, hoping to capitalise on Cole's initiative, but it was never again so popular. Cole then began negotiations for a building further down Bourke Street near the General Post Office.

== Cole's Book Arcade ==
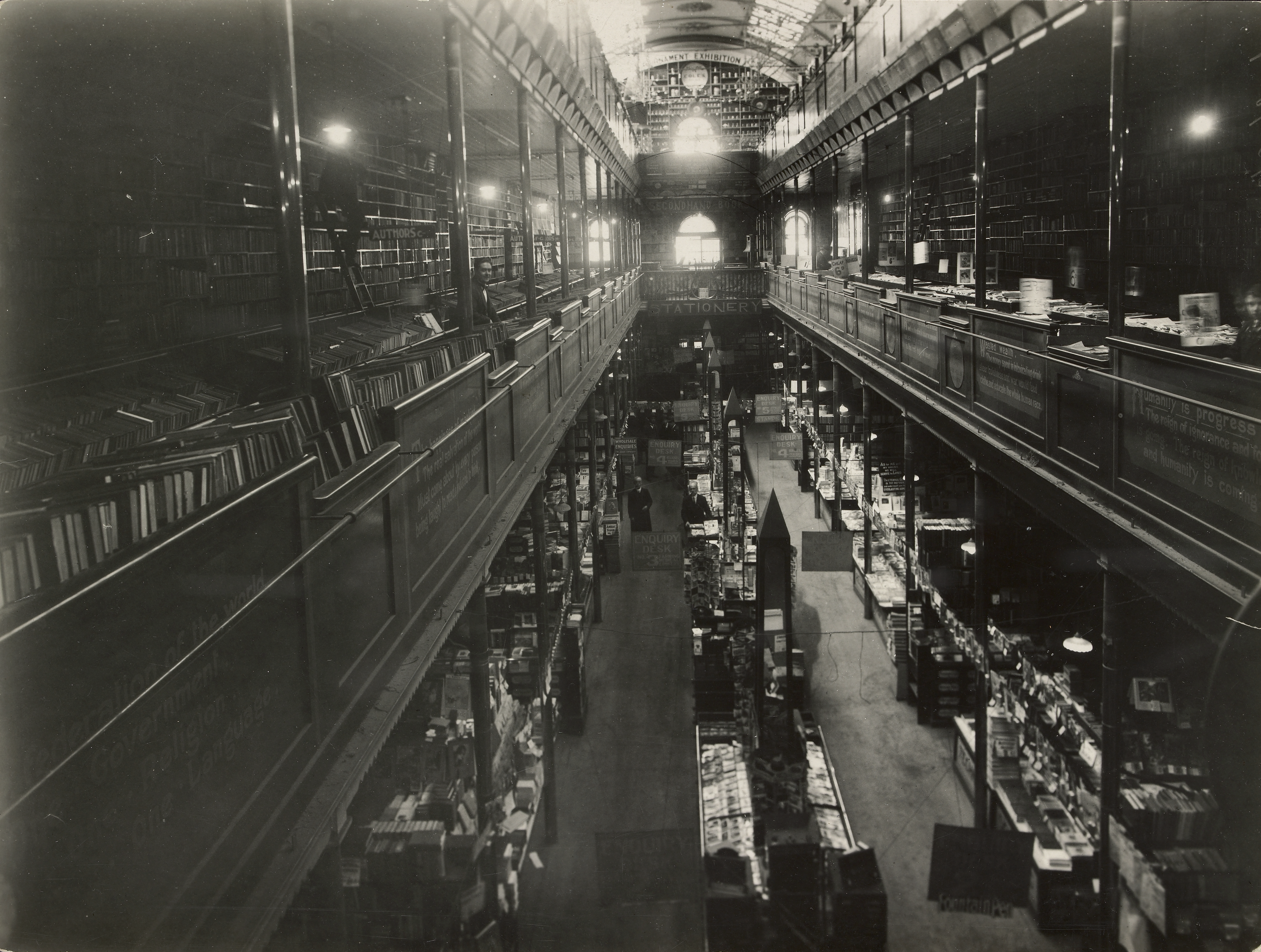
Interior of Cole's Book Arcade, Bourke Street, Melbourne

Cole's Book Arcade was opened in its new location on 27 January 1883 and grew into one of the great book businesses of Australia. It became known as "the prettiest sight in Melbourne". Such was its renown that Cole's Book Arcade was visited by writers Rudyard Kipling and Mark Twain during their travels to Australia. The shop was a huge three story space, with new books on the ground floor, used books on the first, and knick-knacks on the top. Over the years it expanded in size and variety of offerings, such as a music department and cafe, and a small orchestra played on the first floor at lunchtimes. Eventually it ran right through to Little Collins Street and incorporated buildings on either side.

== Funny Picture Books ==
He compiled and published a large number of popular books, of which the Cole's Funny Picture Book series, which was launched with great publicity on Christmas Eve 1879, and Cole's Fun Doctor were most successful, their sales running into many hundreds of thousands. Another publication (early 1900s) was Cole's Treasury of Song, A Collection of the Most Popular Songs [Old and New] containing about a thousand songs.

== Other publishing activities ==
Under the "E. W. Cole" and "Cole's Book Arcade" imprints, Cole published books on many subjects from war and peace to spiritualism, from popular works of adventure and humour to volumes of sheet music and the great literary classics. He also published many book series, including the Federation of the World Library, the Cream of Human Thought Library, the Commonwealth Series, Cole's Commonwealth Music Books and Cole's Useful Books. Authors published ranged from Henry Lawson to W. T. Stead.

== Horticulture books ==
Cole also had great success publishing gardening and horticultural literature. Cole’s Penny Garden Guide was abridged from the Law Somner and Co. Handbook to the Garden (1880), a device much used by Cole. His biggest garden success was Cole’s Australasian Gardening and Domestic Floriculture (1897) by William Elliott. He also published Hamilton McEwin’s The Fruitgrower’s Handbook, and reprinted others, such as John Lockley’s Rose Growing Made Easy, under his imprint. Cole’s The Happifying Gardening Hobby (1918), an endearing anthology of words and pictures, embodied his altruistic wish for universal health and happiness. Historian Ken Duxbury describes this work as a "sort of horticultural version" of Cole’s Funny Picture Book. Cole also edited a booklet entitled Cotton Growing: The Coming Leading Industry in Australia in 1905 and in 1913, the second edition of The Fruitgrower’s Handbook. Over the next two years, he published two works by A. E. Cole (no relation) The Bouquet: Australian Flower Gardening and The Australian Floral Almanac.

== Current affairs ==
In the final years of his life Cole penned a number of pamphlets on social and political issues. These included A White Australia Impossible (1898) and The White Australia Question (1903), anti-racist tracts directed against the White Australia policy. His fervent opposition to the policy led to him making a six month visit to Japan with his wife and two daughters in 1902. During the First World War he also compiled booklets, such as War (1917), denouncing armed conflict.

== Personal life and legacy ==
A photograph of E. W. Cole in a garden with his grandson, taken in 1918

Cole married Eliza Frances Jordan in 1875; she predeceased him, dying on 15 March 1911. They lived in a flat above the arcade. Cole himself died in Melbourne on 16 December 1918 and was buried in Boroondara Cemetery. Two sons and three daughters outlived him.

Cole has been dubbed a "marketing genius", with his Book Arcade being an integral part of "Marvellous Melbourne" and designed as a "carnival, a place to see and be seen", a "shop like no other, crammed with new and second-hand books and other wares, but with the atmosphere of a circus", and enticing customers of all ages in "with a menagerie and fernery, a band, a clockwork symphonion and other mechanical delights", while its main business remained the selling of books. Its proprietor, E. W. Cole, was moreover an "optimist and idealist, believing passionately in the power of education and envisaged a world without borders", views which he expounded through his books and pamphlets.
