= Harry T. Creswell =

American lawyer and politician

- Creswell in 1895

Member of the Nevada Senate from the Nye County district
- In office November 8, 1876 – November 2, 1880
- Preceded by: D. P. Walter
- Succeeded by: Joseph T. Williams

District Attorney of Nye County, Nevada
- In office 1874–1876

District Attorney of Lander County, Nevada
- In office 1880–1887

City Attorney of San Francisco
- In office 1893 – August 23, 1898
- Preceded by: John H. Durst
- Succeeded by: James L. Gallagher

Member of the Police Commission of San Francisco
- In office July 30, 1906 – March 1907

Personal details
- Born: December 10, 1850 Eutaw, Alabama, U.S.
- Died: December 29, 1914 (aged 64) San Francisco, California, U.S.
- Party: Democratic Party
- Spouse: Lucy Crittenden Nesbitt
- Children: Harry Innis Thornton Creswell and Gertrude Crittenden Creswell
- Education: Greene Springs School
- Profession: Lawyer

Harry Thornton Creswell (December 10, 1850 – December 29, 1914) was an American lawyer and state senator.

== Biography ==
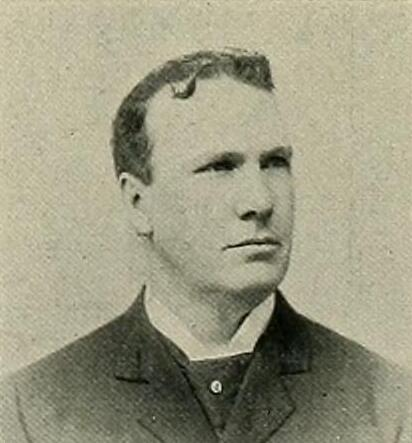
Creswell c. 1897

He was born in Eutaw, Alabama in 1850. Creswell's father was David Creswell, a judge, and his mother was Gertrude Creswell. He was educated at the Greene Springs School in Hale County. After that, Creswell was educated in law. In 1870, he moved from Louisiana to San Francisco. Four year later, Creswell moved to Belmont, Nevada and became admitted to the bar in Nevada. It was then that his career began. Creswell was elected District Attorney of Nye County that same year and his term ended in 1876. On November 7, 1876, Creswell was elected member of the Nevada Senate as a Democrat. He represented Nye County in the Senate and his term started the following day. Creswell served in two regular sessions and his term ended in November 1880. After that, he moved to Lander County and Creswell served as District Attorney of that county from 1880 to 1887. He was candidate for district judge of Nevada, but was not elected.

At the end of the 1880s, Creswell moved to San Francisco and continued with practicing law. He was admitted to the bar in California in 1888. In 1890, Creswell was a candidate for City and County Attorney of San Francisco, but he was defeated. During the next elections in 1892, however, he was elected to that office, serving from 1893 until his resignation in 1898, upon which assistant City Attorney James L. Gallagher succeeded him. That office entailed membership to the Board of City Hall Commissioners. Back then, the San Francisco City Hall was being constructed and Creswell insisted on the use of materials from California to build the city hall. Creswell resigned in his last term to become a member of the law firm "Garber, Creswell & Garber", that was founded in 1897. He kept working there until Judge Garber died, after which he worked independently. In the aftermath of the 1906 San Francisco earthquake, Creswell was appointed member of the Committee of Fifty, that was called into existence by the Mayor of San Francisco.

In July 1906, he was appointed member of the Police Commission of San Francisco by Mayor Eugene Schmitz, but resigned during his term, in March 1907, to work as a civil lawyer. In 1912, Creswell was a delegate from California to the Democratic National Convention of that year. At the Convention, he was a member of the Credentials Committee as well. Creswell died in San Francisco on December 29, 1914, at the age of 64. He was married to Lucy Crittenden Nesbitt and they got two children, Harry and Gertrude. Also, Creswell had been a member of the Pacific-Union Club and the Southern Club of San Francisco.
