= Hiram I. Bearss =

United States Marine Corps general

Hiram Iddings Bearss
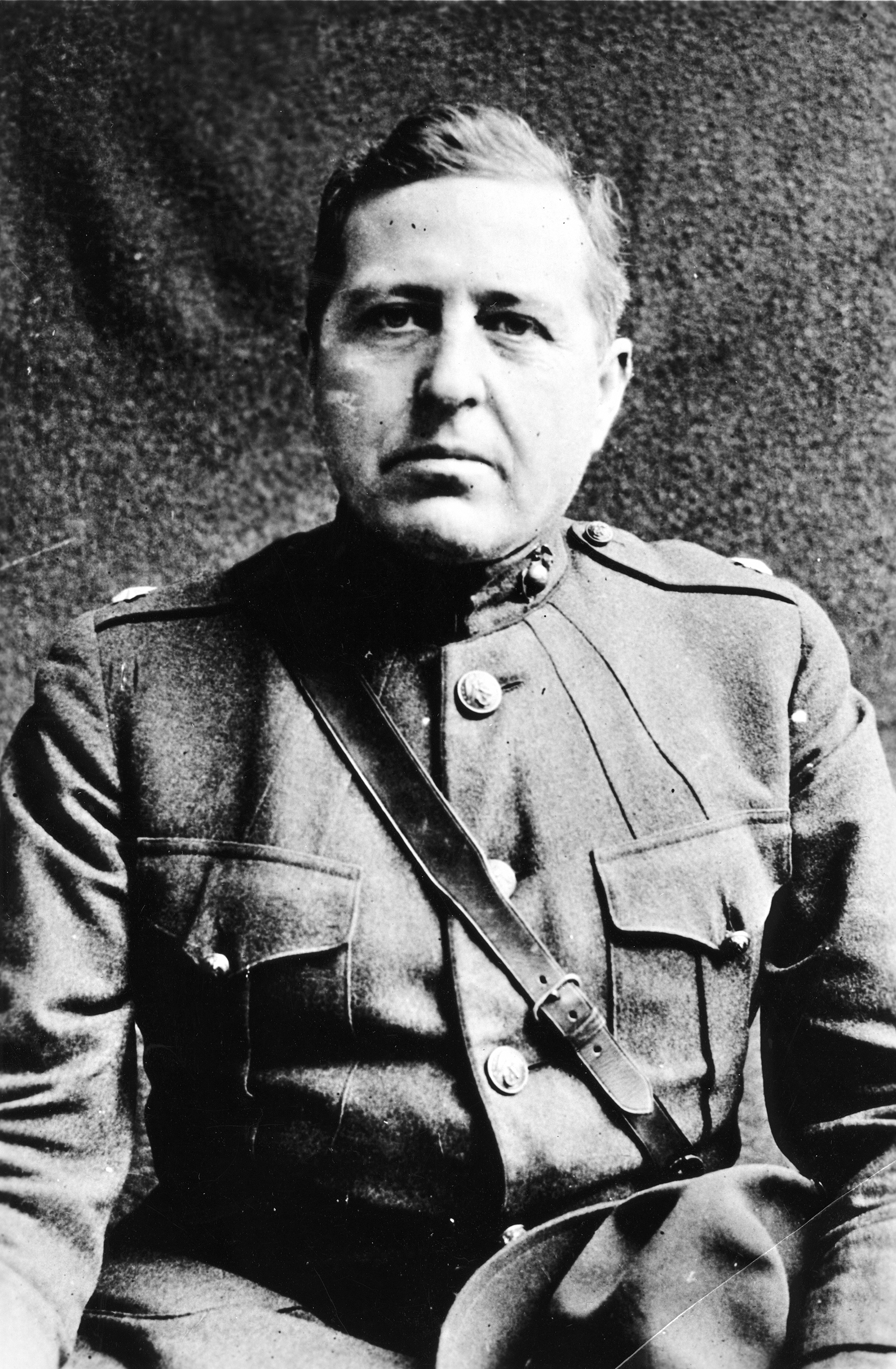
- Medal of Honor recipient Hiram I. Bearss
- Born: April 13, 1875; Peru, Indiana, U.S.
- Died: August 27, 1938 (aged 63); Columbia City, Indiana, U.S.
- Burial place: Mount Hope Cemetery, Peru, Indiana, U.S.
- Spouse: Louise Middleton (m. 1904)
- Military career
- Allegiance: United States of America
- Branch: United States Marine Corps
- Service years: 1899–1919
- Rank: Colonel (advanced to brigadier general in 1936)
- Nickname: "Hiking Hiram"
- Commands: 3rd Provisional Regiment; 5th Marines; 3rd Battalion, 9th Infantry Regiment; 102nd Infantry Regiment; 51st Infantry Brigade
- Conflicts: Philippine–American War United States occupation of Veracruz; World War I; Battle of Belleau Wood; Battle of Saint-Mihiel
- Awards: Medal of Honor (1901); Distinguished Service Cross (1918); Navy Distinguished Service Medal; Croix de Guerre

Hiram Iddings Bearss (April 13, 1875 – August 27, 1938) was an officer of the United States Marine Corps who received the Medal of Honor for heroism during the Philippine–American War and the Distinguished Service Cross for his valor in World War I.

== Early life and education ==
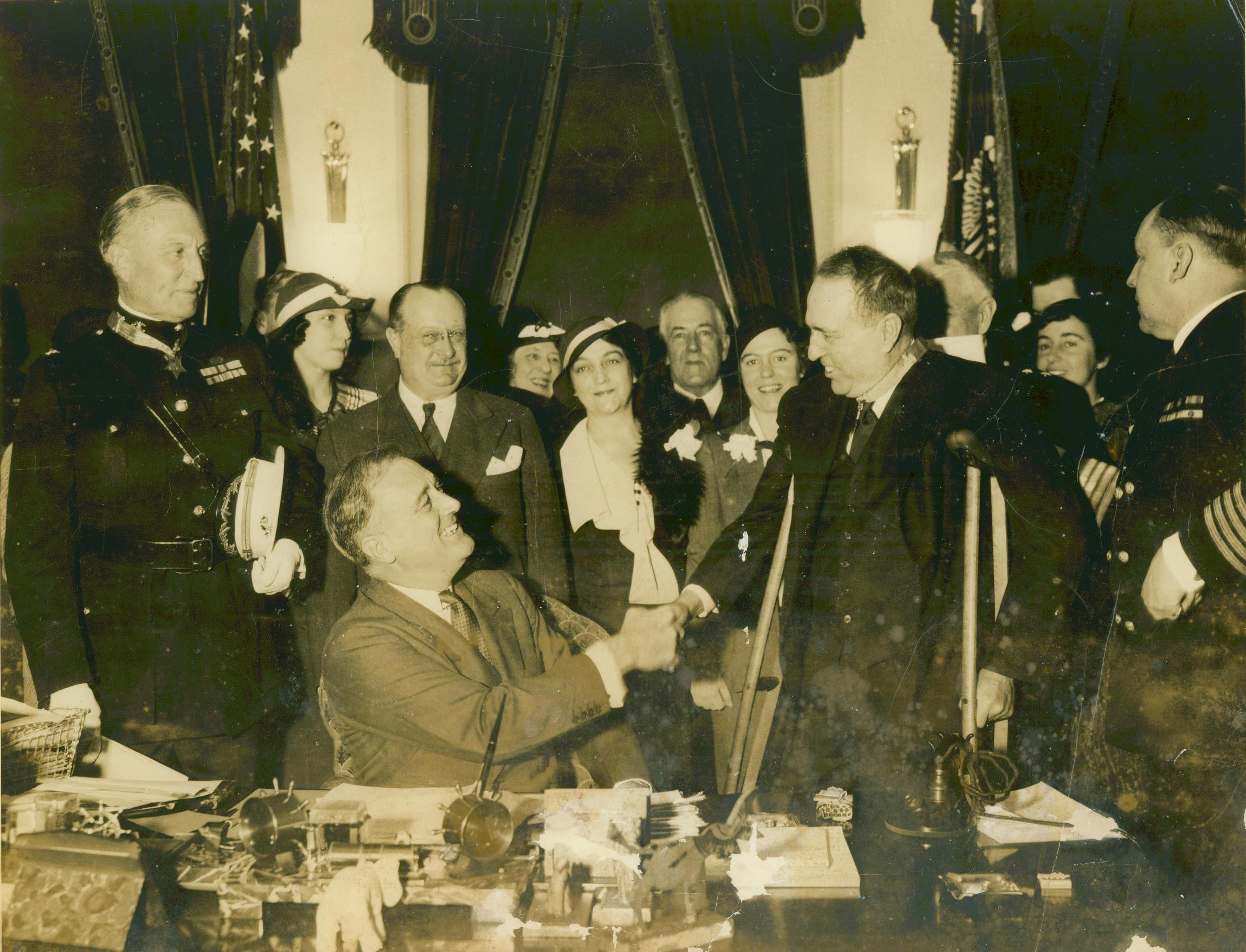
President Franklin D. Roosevelt presents the Medal of Honor to Hiram I. Bearss and David Dixon Porter at a White House ceremony April 25, 1934

Hiram was born April 13, 1875, in Peru, Indiana, to Frank and Desdemona Bearss. His father was away on business at the time, but upon returning was informed that his son, "Mike" had been born. Through most of his youth Mike did not seem to like his given name of Hiram and was prone to fighting anyone who used it. He had one brother, Braxton and three sisters, Emmy, Desdemona and Lucy. As a child he got into a lot of trouble, frequently getting into fights and defying those in authority positions above him, including his parents. In addition to the trouble he got into, he also had difficulty in school but managed to do well enough to continue his education. As a young boy, he found an interest in horses and became a good rider, winning a horse race when he was only six. When he was a teenager he ran away from home but was found by his father, several weeks later, tending to some prize horses in a distant town. After convincing his father to let him continue caring for the animals he returned home. Along with his love of horses he was also a good athlete and enjoyed playing football and baseball.

When he was a teenager his father got him into the Notre Dame preparatory school where he continued playing sports, getting into fights and playing pranks on the teachers and other students. Although he completed the first year, even making the honor roll for a few months, he was not allowed to return. During the summer, he played baseball in his hometown of Peru and continued to do so every summer for the next several years. The next year, he again attempted school, this time at a preparatory school for Purdue University where he only lasted a few months. After accepting a large donation from his father, Depauw University accepted Hiram and while there he played on the school football team. Although he was smaller than the other players, he did fairly well. The next year, he was not accepted back to Depauw and his father sent him to yet another school, along with his brother. Norwich University in Northfield, Vermont, was a military school and did not tolerate Hiram's shenanigans. After the first couple months, he intended to leave but was convinced to stay by his brother Braxton. He played football and again faced disciplinary action due to mischief. Hiram and his brother made it through the first two years at Norwich, but at the age of 21 Hiram was unsatisfied and wished to explore a path that was more adventurous.

He married Louise Middleton in 1904, and they had one daughter.

== Military career ==
Bearss was commissioned in the United States Marine Corps on May 26, 1899, and was promoted to the rank of captain on July 23, 1900. In 1901 he was stationed in the Philippines where he earned the Medal of Honor for heroism in combat on the island of Samar where he led a successful attack on a heavily defended insurgent position.

During World War I, Bearss had risen to the rank of colonel and served in France as commander of the 5th Marine Regiment, taking over from Charles A. Doyen, part of the 4th Marine Brigade. Wendell Cushing Neville took over from him in January 1918. He later commanded the 102nd Infantry (a unit of the Army's 26th Division) at Marcheville in 1918, for which he was awarded the Distinguished Service Cross and the Navy Distinguished Service Medal.

== Later life and death ==
Bearss retired from the Marine Corps in 1919 and made his residence in his home state of Indiana.

In December 1922, he was involved in an altercation with members of the Ku Klux Klan who surrounded his car during a parade they were holding in Peru, Indiana. He forced them back by brandishing a wrench and shouting "Come on you Kluxers, one and all; I'll take on the lot of you."

He was a delegate from Indiana to the 1936 Republican National Convention.

Bearss died August 27, 1938, in an automobile collision in Columbia City, Indiana, while en route from Chicago to Peru, Indiana. He was buried there in Mount Hope Cemetery.

== Awards and honors ==
Bearss received 19 military decorations in his 20 years of service including several for his actions in combat. These include decorations from the United States and other countries. From the United States he received the Medal of Honor, Distinguished Service Cross, Navy Distinguished Service Medal and the Army Distinguished Service Medal.

In addition to these decorations he also received awards from other countries for his conduct in battle from France, Belgium and Italy. From France he received the Légion d'honneur officer class and the Fourragère. He also received the Croix de Guerre with two palms from France as well as the Italian War Merit Cross and the Belgian Croix de Guerre.

He also received campaign medals for the various wars and battles he fought in which included the Navy Expeditionary Medal with three numerals, Spanish Campaign Medal, Philippine Campaign Medal, Mexican Service Medal, Dominican Campaign Medal, World War I Victory Medal with battle clasps for Aisne, Aisne-Marne and St. Mihiel, Meuse-Argonne and the defensive sector clasp.

Medal of Honor	Distinguished Service Cross	Navy Distinguished Service Medal	
Army Distinguished Service Medal	Philippine Campaign Medal	World War I Victory Medal	Croix de guerre (WWI)

=== Medal of Honor citation ===
The President of the United States takes pleasure in the name of The Congress in presenting the MEDAL OF HONOR to

COLONEL HIRAM I. BEARSSUNITED STATES MARINE CORPS

for service in Samar, P. I., as set forth in the following CITATION:

For extraordinary heroism and eminent and conspicuous conduct in battle at the junction of the Cadacan and Sohoton Rivers, Samar, P. I., November 17, 1901. Colonel Bearss, then Captain, second in command of the column upon their uniting ashore in the Sohoton region, made a surprise attack on the fortified cliffs and capturing and destroying a powder magazine, 40 lantacas (guns), rice, food and cuartels. Due to his courage, intelligence, discrimination and zeal, he successfully led his men up the cliffs [by] means of bamboo ladders to a height of 200 feet. The cliffs were of soft stone of volcanic origin, in the nature of pumice and were honeycombed with caves. Tons of rocks were suspended in platforms held in position by vine cables (known as bejuco) in readiness to be precipitated upon people below. After driving the insurgents from their position which was almost impregnable, being covered with numerous trails lined with poisoned spears, pits, etc., he led his men across the river, scaled the cliffs on the opposite side, and destroyed the camps there. He and the men under his command overcame incredible difficulties and dangers in destroying positions which according to reports from old prisoners, had taken three years to perfect, were held as a final rallying point, and were never before penetrated by white troops. Captain Bearss also rendered distinguished public service in the presence of the enemy at Quinapundan River, Samar, P. I., on January 19, 1902.

=== Distinguished Service Cross ===
Citation:

The President of the United States of America, authorized by Act of Congress, July 9, 1918, takes pleasure in presenting the Distinguished Service Cross to Colonel Hiram Iddings Bearss (MCSN: 0-1102), United States Marine Corps, for extraordinary heroism while attached to the 102d Infantry Regiment (Army), 26th Division, A.E.F., in action at Marcheville and Riaville, France, 26 September 1918. Colonel Bearss' indomitable courage and leadership led to the complete success of the attack by two battalions of his regiment on Marcheville and Riaville. During the attacks these two towns changed hands four times, finally remaining in our possession until the troops were ordered to withdraw. Under terrific machine-gun and artillery fire, Colonel Bearss was the first to enter Marcheville, where he directed operations. Later, upon finding his party completely surrounded, he personally assisted in fighting the enemy off with pistol and hand grenades.

=== Army Distinguished Service Medal ===
Citation:

The President of the United States of America, authorized by Act of Congress, July 9, 1918, takes pleasure in presenting the Army Distinguished Service Medal to Colonel Hiram Iddings Bearss (MCSN: 0-1102), United States Marine Corps, for exceptionally meritorious and distinguished services to the Government of the United States, in a duty of great responsibility during World War I. Colonel Bearss commanded with distinction the 102d Infantry Regiment, 26th Division, achieving notable success in the active operations in which that regiment was engaged. By his untiring energy and dauntless courage in overcoming the numerous difficulties confronting him, he gave proof of military leadership of high order.

=== Navy Distinguished Service Medal ===
Citation:

The President of the United States of America takes pleasure in presenting the Navy Distinguished Service Medal to Colonel Hiram Iddings Bearss (MCSN: 0-1102), United States Marine Corps, for exceptionally meritorious and distinguished services. Colonel Bearss commanded with distinction the 102d Infantry Regiment (Army), 26th Division, achieving notable success in the active operations in which that regiment was engaged. By his untiring energy and dauntless courage in overcoming the numerous difficulties confronting him, he gave proof of military leadership of high order.

== Legacy ==
=== USS Bearss ===
The United States Navy named a Fletcher-class destroyer in his honor. USS Bearss (DD-654) was launched on July 25, 1943, by Gulf Shipbuilding Corporation of Chickasaw, Alabama. The ship was sponsored by General Bearss' widow and commissioned April 12, 1944.

=== Marine Corps League ===
The Marine Corps League unit located in Indianapolis, Indiana is named the Hiram I. Bearss Detachment in his honor.

== See also ==
- List of Medal of Honor recipients
- List of Philippine–American War Medal of Honor recipients
