= A. C. Bearss =

American politician

Member of the Nevada Assembly from the Nye County district
- In office November 9, 1864 – November 6, 1866
- Succeeded by: James M. Groves and W. T. Jones

Personal details
- Party: National Union Party

A. C. Bearss was an American assemblyman in Nevada. As a Unionist, he was elected member of the Nevada Assembly, where he represented Nye County, on November 8, 1864. Bearss' term started the following day and after serving in a regular session he was re-elected on November 7, 1865. After serving in another regular session, his second term ended in November 1866. Bearss was succeeded by James M. Groves and W. T. Jones.

Bearss' opponent in the 1864 election, Democrat John Booth, owned a newspaper, called The Advertiser. In that newspaper, Booth published editorials, in which he defamed Bearss, before the election. As revenge, Bearss' friends stole the lever of Booth's press, but Booth continued publishing the newspaper with defaming editorials. Despite these editorials, Bearss managed to win the election.
