= Frank M. Proctor =

American politician

Member of the Nevada Senate from the Nye County district
- In office November 9, 1864 – November 3, 1868
- Preceded by: N/A
- Succeeded by: Robert Mullen

Personal details
- Born: 1827/1828 Kentucky
- Died: 1892
- Party: Democratic Party
- Profession: Lawyer

Francis "Frank" Marion Proctor (1827 or 1828–1892) was an American lawyer, state senator, and co-founder of Carson City, Nevada.

He was born in the state of Kentucky and moved from that state to California in 1849. In Sierra County, Proctor worked as a lawyer and as the assessor of Sierra County. In 1858, he moved with a group of four members from Downieville to Eagle Valley in the area that is now known as Nevada. When they arrived, three members of the group, Curry, Musser, and Proctor, bought the Eagle Ranch for $1,000 and a down payment of $300. The ranch was situated on the current location of Carson City and thus the group founded Carson City with Proctor as a co-founder. In 1864, he claimed to have named the city, but Abraham Curry is generally given credit for that. Proctor owned one-third of the Eagle Ranch, but gave half of it to Benjamin F. Green, who was the fourth member of the group. In 1859, Proctor was vice-president of a constitutional convention, that had as objective to create Nevada Territory. During the convention, Proctor represented Humboldt County. After Nevada became a territory, he filed his candidacy to become Chief Justice of the Supreme Court of the territory, but he lost.

Proctor was a member of the 1864 Nevada Constitutional Convention, that started on July 4 and produced an approved constitution. He was elected member with 118 votes. Proctor was one of the two members representing Nye County and he was the only Democrat at the Convention; all others were Unionists. Records from the Convention stated that Proctor was married. He was elected senator of Nye County in the Nevada Senate on November 8, 1864, and his term began the following day. He served in three regular sessions and one special session. In the first and second regular session, he was the only Democratic member of the Nevada Senate. Proctor advocated states' rights and legislation to extend suffrage to women and to make it possible for women to hold public office. His term ended in 1868 and he was succeeded by Robert Mullen. During the 1860s or 1870s, he moved to another state and he died in 1892. East and West Proctor Street in Carson City were named after Proctor and in 1995 he was inducted by a senate resolution into the Senate Hall of Fame of Nevada.
