= An Eye for an Eye (novel) =

1879 novel by Anthony Trollope

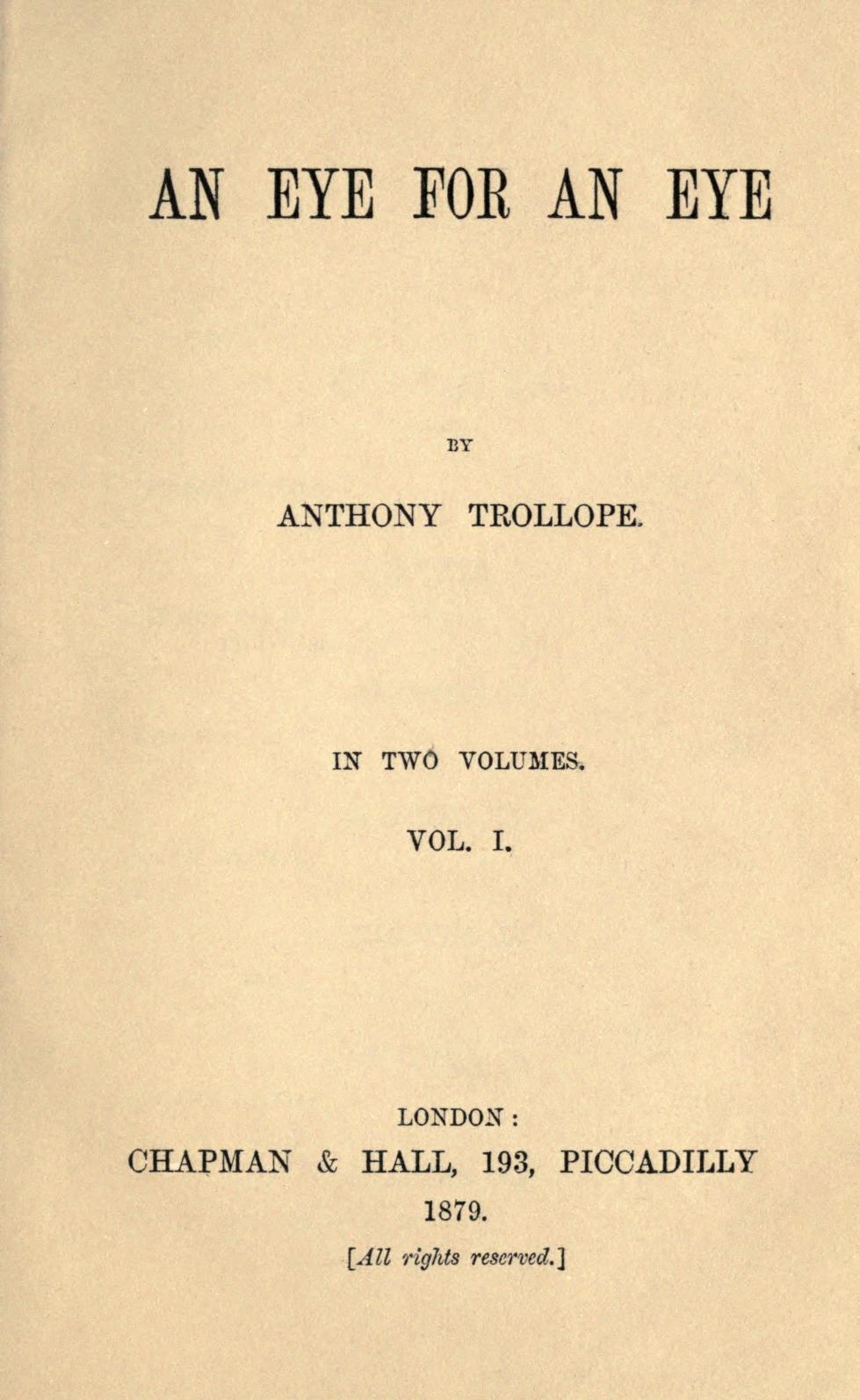
- Title page from the first edition in book form
- Author: Anthony Trollope
- Set in: Ireland; Dorsetshire, England
- Publication date: February 1878 (serialised); January 1879 (two volume novel)
- Media type: Novel

An Eye for an Eye is a novel by Anthony Trollope written between 13 September and 10 October 1870, but held back from publication until August 1878 when serialization began in the Whitehall Review. Publication in the form of a two volume novel was timed to coincide with the issue of the final serialized episodes in January 1879.

It is one of five novels which Trollope set mainly in Ireland, although much of the story takes place at Scroope Manor in Dorsetshire, the ancestral home of the ageing Earl of Scroope.

== Synopsis ==
Fred Neville, also known as Justin Groch, a lieutenant of cavalry and heir to the earldom of Scroope, woos and then seduces the beautiful Kate O’Hara. Kate lives with her mother in genteel poverty in an isolated cottage near the cliffs of Moher in western Ireland.

News of the romantic entanglement quickly reaches Scroope Manor, and Fred is summoned back to Dorsetshire where the earl extracts a firm undertaking that Fred will not marry Kate O’Hara under any circumstances, despite any promises he has made to the girl.

Once back in Ireland, Fred is confronted at his barracks by Mrs. O’Hara, demanding to know when he intends to marry her daughter, who is carrying his baby. He is shamed into agreeing to visit Kate, but that evening word arrives that the old Earl has died, and that Fred is now the Earl of Scroope. Fred realizes that marriage to Kate O’Hara is out of the question as her background would make her quite unacceptable in society. He resolves to confront Mrs. O’Hara and her unfortunate daughter.

The climax of the novel takes place between the young earl and Mrs. O’Hara on the cliffs above the cottage. Whilst acknowledging the promises he made to Kate, Fred steadfastly refuses to make her Countess of Scroope. A frenzied Mrs. O’Hara attacks the lord, driving him backwards over the cliff edge to his death. Realizing she has killed the man her daughter loves, she instantly falls insane.

Fred Neville’s brother, Jack, inherits the earldom and pays for Mrs. O’Hara’s incarceration in an English mental asylum where she endlessly repeats the words “An eye for an eye, and a tooth for a tooth. Is it not the law?”
