= D. P. Walter =

American politician

Member of the Nevada Senate from the Nye County district
- In office November 6, 1872 – November 7, 1876
- Preceded by: Robert Mullen
- Succeeded by: Harry T. Creswell

Personal details
- Party: Republican

D. P. Walter was a Republican state senator. On November 5, 1872, he was elected member of the Nevada Senate and represented Nye County. Walter's term started the next day. He attended two regular sessions and his term ended in 1876. Walter was succeeded by Harry T. Creswell.
