= USS Bearss =

Fletcher-class destroyer

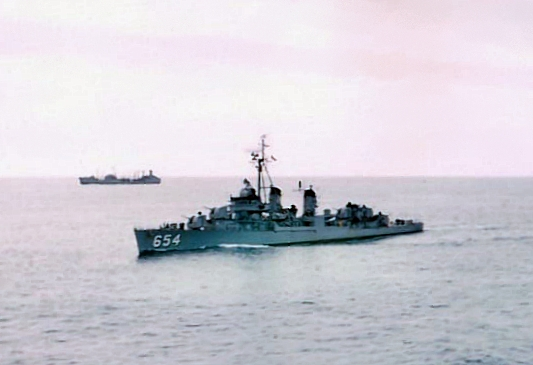
- USS Bearss (DD-654), in 1957-58

History

United States
- Name: USS Bearss (DD-654)
- Namesake: Hiram I. Bearss
- Builder: Gulf Shipbuilding Corp., Chickasaw, Alabama
- Laid down: 14 July 1942
- Launched: 25 July 1943
- Commissioned: 12 April 1944
- Decommissioned: 30 December 1963
- Stricken: 1 December 1974
- Fate: Sold for scrap, 14 April 1976

General characteristics
- Class & type: Fletcher-class destroyer
- Displacement: 2,050 tons
- Length: 376 ft 6 in (114.7 m)
- Beam: 39 ft 8 in (12.1 m)
- Draft: 17 ft 9 in (5.4 m)
- Propulsion: 60,000 shp (45 MW); 2 propellers
- Speed: 35 knots (65 km/h; 40 mph)
- Range: 6500 nm at 15 kn; (12,000 km at 28 km/h)
- Complement: 329
- Armament: 5 × 5 in (130 mm)/38 guns, 4 × 40 mm AA guns, 4 × 20 mm AA guns, 10 × 21 inch (533 mm) torpedo tubes, 6 × depth charge projectors, 2 × depth charge tracks

USS Bearss (DD-654) was a Fletcher-class destroyer of the United States Navy, named for Brigadier General Hiram I. Bearss (1875–1938), USMC, who was awarded the Medal of Honor for actions during the Philippine–American War.

Bearss was launched 25 July 1943 by Gulf Shipbuilding Corp., Chickasaw, Ala., sponsored by Mrs. Louise Bearss, widow of General Bearss; and commissioned 12 April 1944.

== Service history ==
=== World War II ===
Bearss reported to the Pacific Fleet and operated in Hawaiian waters during July 1944. On 9 August 1944, she arrived at Adak, Alaska, and served with Task Force 92 (TF 92) and TF 94 in anti-shipping sweeps and bombardments in the Kuril Islands, as well as patrolling in the Sea of Okhotsk until the end of the war. She took part in the bombardments of Matsuwa (21 November 1944, 16 March, and 11–12 June 1945), Suribachi Wan (5 January and 19 May 1945); Kurabu Wan (18 February 1945); and the anti-shipping sweeps (19 May, 25 June, 17–19, 22 July, and 11 August 1945). Bearss arrived at Ominato, Honshū, 8 September 1945 and patrolled along the southern coast of Hokkaidō until returning to the United States. She arrived at Charleston, S.C., 22 December 1945; went into commission in reserve 12 July 1946; and out of commission in reserve 31 January 1947. She was also the ship assigned to Lt. Henry Fonda, the future award-winning actor.

=== Post war ===
Bearss was recommissioned 7 September 1951 and joined Destroyer Division 322 (DesDiv 322), Destroyer Squadron 32 (DesRon 32), Atlantic Fleet. She served along the Atlantic coast and in the Caribbean on normal peacetime operations. She made two Mediterranean cruises and one Far Eastern cruise (April–October 1954), which took her around the world.

In August and September 1958, the Bearss was part of Navy Task Force 88 (TF 88), during Operation Argus, which was involved in conducting nuclear tests in the very high atmosphere. Norman R Ross, a Radarman aboard the Bearss wrote about the mission in his book SIXTY DAYS DOWN UNDER, which is available on Amazon.

Homeported in Norfolk, Bearss was transferred to duty as a "reserve destroyer" in 1960 or 61, with a skeleton crew of active duty Navy personnel and a reserve crew that drilled aboard one weekend a month. The reserve crew was called to active duty as a result of the Cuban missile crisis and reported onboard 23 October 1961, left shortly thereafter for "refresher training" at the Naval Base at Guantánamo Bay, Cuba, and returned to Norfolk in January 1962. She operated as a part of the First Fleet's Task Force Bravo, with frequent at-sea periods screening carriers and taking part antisubmarine warfare training off the Virginia Capes. Her reserve crew was released from active duty 1 Aug. 1962. Her commanding officer for that period was CDR William Savage, USNR.

Bearss was decommissioned on 30 December 1963. She was stricken from the Naval Vessel Register on 1 December 1974. The ship was sold 14 April 1976 and broken up for scrap.

== Awards ==
Bearss received one battle star for her World War II service.
