= Ed Bearss =

American military veteran and historian (1923–2020)

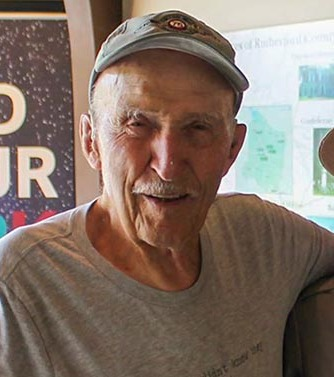
- Bearss in 2020
- Born: June 26, 1923; Billings, Montana, U.S.
- Died: September 15, 2020 (aged 97)
- Education: Georgetown University (BSFS); IU Bloomington (MA)
- Occupations: Marine; historian
- Employer(s): National Park Service (1955–1995)
- Title: Chief Historian; Historian Emeritus
- Spouse: Margie Riddle (m. 1958; died 2006)
- Military career
- Branch: United States Marine Corps
- Years: 1941–1946
- Rank: Corporal
- Unit: 3rd Battalion, 7th Marines
- Conflicts: World War II; Guadalcanal campaign; New Britain campaign; Battle of Cape Gloucester

Edwin Cole Bearss (June 26, 1923 – September 15, 2020) was an American historian of the American Civil War, tour guide, and United States Marine Corps veteran of World War II.

== Personal life ==
Edwin Cole Bearss was born in Billings, Montana, on June 26, 1923. He was raised working on his grandfather's ranch near Hardin, Montana, and attended a one-room school in Sarpy, Montana.

On July 30, 1958, Bearss married author and teacher Margie Riddle of Mississippi (born 1925/1926), and the two had three children: Sara in 1960, Edwin Jr. in 1962, and Mary in 1965. In 2002, the couple lived in Arlington, Virginia. Margie died c. 2006, and Bearss died on 15 September 2020.

== Education ==
Bearss was accepted to St. John's Military Academy in Delafield, Wisconsin, in 1937 and graduated from Hardin High School in 1941. He earned his Bachelor of Science in Foreign Service from Georgetown University in 1949, and his Master of Arts (with a thesis on Patrick Cleburne) in 1955 from Indiana University Bloomington. Bearss earned his degrees courtesy of the G.I. Bill.

In February 2005, Bearss was awarded an honorary degree from Lincoln College in Lincoln, Illinois; Gettysburg College did the same in 2010.

== Military service ==
Following his high school graduation, Bearss enlisted in the United States Marine Corps in 1941. During World War II, he served in the 3rd Marine Raider Battalion; he fought in the Guadalcanal and New Britain campaigns with the 1st Marine Division. In 1943, Bearss caught malaria in the South Pacific, and was sent to New Zealand to recover. On January 2, 1944, with the 3rd Battalion, 7th Marines at the Battle of Cape Gloucester, Bearss was hit by Imperial Japanese Army machine-gun fire that broke both of his arms and injured his heel and buttocks; after spending the next 26 months in hospital, he left the Marines in March 1946 with the rank of corporal.

== History career ==
Bearss began his career with the National Park Service (NPS) at Vicksburg National Military Park in 1955. He prepared historical studies for the Interior Department agency and founded the Mississippi Civil War Roundtable. For the NPS, he found the Civil War-era cannon Widow Blakely (also Whistling Dick) which had been used in the Vicksburg campaign, as well as the wreck of USS Cairo. He also found two lost forts in Grand Gulf, Mississippi, and was party to "the establishment of Grand Gulf as a state military monument." Bearss was the NPS's chief historian from 1981–1994, and "special assistant to the director for military sites" until 1995; in 1991, he was made the NPS's chief historian of military sites. Bearss was also a commentator featured in the Ken Burns series The Civil War.

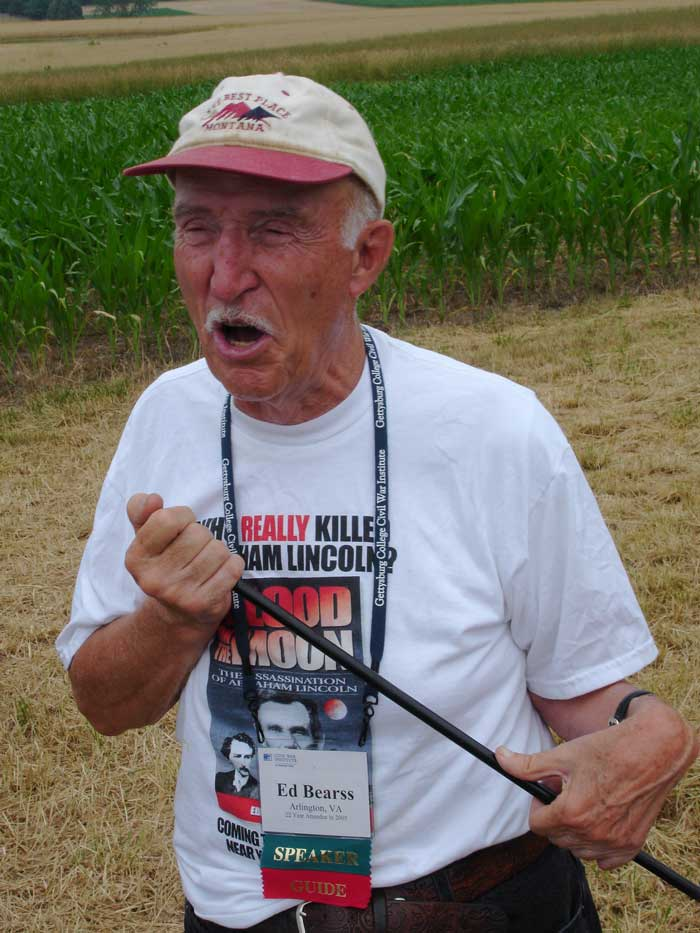
Bearss leading a tour at Gettysburg National Military Park (July 2005)

Bearss retired from the NPS on September 30, 1995, though he continued to lead tours of ACW battlefields for the Smithsonian Institution, the National Geographic Society, the National Trust for Historic Preservation, and Civil War Roundtables. The NPS awarded him the unique title of National Park Service Historian Emeritus. Frances and Roger G. Kennedy endowed the Bearss Fellowship Award in his honor; it "supports NPS employees' graduate-level studies in American History or American Studies and is administered in partnership with the National Park Foundation".

== Recognition ==
The Company of Military Historians made Bearss a fellow of that group in 1964, and he received the Nevins-Freeman Award in 1980 for his work on American Civil War (ACW) history. Three years later, the Department of the Interior awarded him the Distinguished Service Award, and it was followed by a commendation from the United States Secretary of the Army in 1985. In 2011, Bearss received The Lincoln Forum's Richard Nelson Current Award of Achievement acknowledging his "contributions to the spirit of [Abraham] Lincoln in both word and deed." On April 23, 2015, US Representative Gerry Connolly from Virginia introduced bill H.R.2059 to award Bearss the Congressional Gold Medal "in recognition of his contributions to preservation of American Civil War history and continued efforts to bring our nation's history alive for new generations through his interpretive storytelling." In June 2018, the American Battlefield Trust awarded Bearss its first Lifetime Achievement Award "for his many decades dedicated to researching and relating the nation's past to millions of people, as well as his advocacy for battlefield preservation."

== Publications ==
- Decision in Mississippi. Jackson, Mississippi: Commission on the War Between the States. 1962.
- Fields of Honor: Pivotal Battles of the Civil War. University of North Carolina Press. May 2006. ISBN 978-1-4696-7797-2. Archived from the original on January 18, 2025. "Distributed for the Blue and Gray Education Society"
- Forrest at Brice's Cross Roads and in North Mississippi in 1864. Dayton, Ohio: Morningside Bookshop. 1979.
- Grant Strikes a Fatal Blow.
- With Wertz, Jay (1997). Great Battles & Battlefields of the Civil War. United States: Smithsonian Institution.
- Nine Months to Gettysburg.
- With Suderow, Bryce. The Petersburg Campaign: The Eastern Battles and The Western Battles.
- Rebel Victory at Vicksburg.
- Receding Tide: Vicksburg and Gettysburg, the Campaigns that Changed the Civil War. National Geographic Society. 2010.
- Sinking of an Ironclad.
- Steele's Retreat From Camden & The Battle of Jenkins Ferry.
- Un-vexed to the Sea.
- "Unconditional Surrender: The Fall of Fort Donelson". Tennessee Historical Quarterly. 21 (1 & 2). June 1962.
- The Vicksburg Campaign. Vol. 1–3. Dayton, Ohio: Morningside. 1985–1986.
- Vicksburg Is the Key.
- A War of the People.
