= Euclid and His Modern Rivals =

Mathematical book by Lewis Carroll

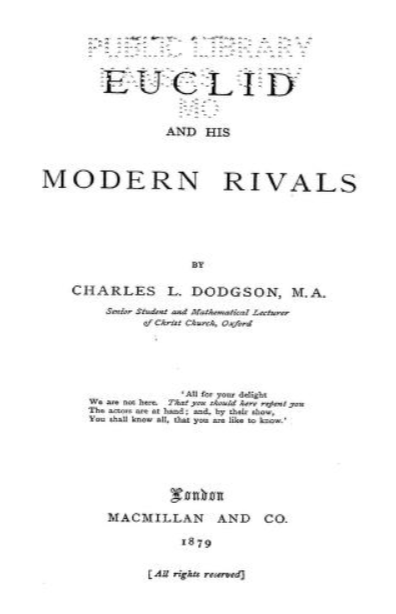
- Title page for Euclid and His Modern Rivals (1879)
- Author: Lewis Carroll
- Language: English
- Genre: Mathematics
- Publication date: 1879

Euclid and His Modern Rivals is a mathematical book published in 1879 by the English mathematician Charles Lutwidge Dodgson (1832–1898), better known under his literary pseudonym "Lewis Carroll". It considers the pedagogic merit of thirteen contemporary geometry textbooks, demonstrating how each in turn is either inferior to or functionally identical to Euclid's Elements.

In it, Dodgson supports using Euclid's geometry textbook The Elements as the geometry textbook in schools against more modern geometry textbooks that were replacing it, advocated by the Association for the Improvement of Geometrical Teaching, satirized in the book as the "Association for the Improvement of Things in General". Euclid's ghost returns in the play to defend his book against its modern rivals and tries to demonstrate how all of them are inferior to his book.

Despite its scholarly subject and content, the work takes the form of a whimsical dialogue, principally between a mathematician named Minos (taken from Minos, judge of the underworld in Greek mythology) and a "devil's advocate" named Professor Niemand (German for 'nobody') who represents the "Modern Rivals" of the title.
