= Cole's Funny Picture Book =

Series of children's books

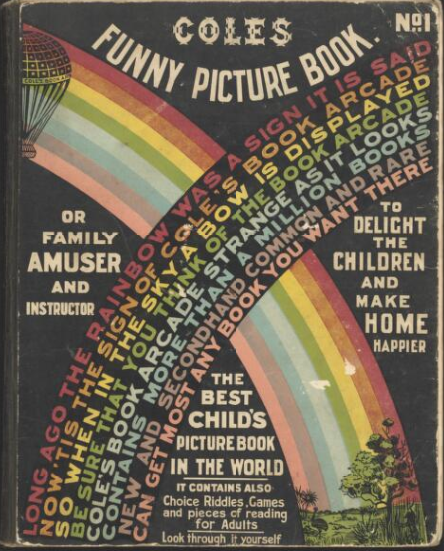
- The Cole's Funny Picture Book No 1 (edition 48)
- Cole's Funny Picture Book No. 1 (1879); Cole's Funny Picture Book No. 2 (1909); Cole's Funny Picture Book No. 3 (1951); Cole's Funny Picture Book No. 4 (1991)
- Author: E. W. Cole
- Country: Australia
- Language: English
- Genre: Victoriana, Humour, Children's, Australian
- Publisher: Cole Publications
- No. of books: 4

Cole's Funny Picture Book is a series of children's books of Victoriana puzzles, stories, poems, jokes and "nutty humour", first compiled by E. W. Cole and synonymous with Cole's Book Arcade.

== Cole's Funny Picture Book No. 1 ==
E. W. Cole began a small publishing and second-hand book-selling business in 1865, and by 1873 had opened the first incarnation of his book arcade, with the recognisable rainbow arch facade. The Cole's Book Arcade became one of the great iconic stores of Melbourne, Australia in the late 19th and early 20th centuries.

The Cole's Funny Picture Book was first published in 1879, being sold from the Book Arcade for 1s and selling a thousand copies that Christmas. The book was divided into themes or "Lands" (e.g. Girl Land, Picture Puzzle Land). It contains many references to the Cole's Book Arcade, and features the Cole's Patent Whipping Machine for Flogging Naughty Boys (48th edition, page 41), as well as E. W. Cole's own vision of the future.

The book was re-printed and re-edited many times, often with new content added—the first edition had only 62 pages, while the iconic Victorian puzzle pictures for which the Funny Picture Book is known were added after the first few editions. By November 1918, the book was in its 48th edition with 242 pages and more than 440,000 copies had been printed.

== Cole's Funny Picture Book No. 2 ==
It was not until 1909 that E. W. Cole compiled a second book, which continued to be sold alongside the first.

== Cole's Funny Picture Book No. 3 ==
E. W. Cole died in 1918, and the Book Arcade closed in 1929; however, his daughter Linda and her husband, A. F. Turnley, ensured the books survived.

It was Linda's son, Cole Turnley, who produced a third book in 1951, which was modern but still true to the original style of the books. The book included a character "Professor Cole", whose only resemblance to E. W. Cole was his name (due to family concerns about a caricature of the real man). A "New Century" Edition of the book was published in 1992, which included new puzzles and content.

== Cole's Funny Picture Book No. 4 ==
Cole Turnley collaborated with his daughter Merron Cullum to produce a fourth book in 1991. The book kept to the Victorian style, but was unashamedly modern, noting "to critics" that "[You shouldn't] be unduly disturbed by period inconsistencies such as the editorial hint that our Journey Games pages could be photocopied and kept in the family car [or that the] print is generally larger than one would expect in a Victorian book..."

The book featured a number of references, influences and content from the previous titles, including the Whipping Machine (which became a plot through the book), the Professor Cole from the third book and the "Land" chapter format of the first book.

== Other titles ==
E. W. Cole produced a number of books including Cole's Fun Doctor and Cole's Music of the Bells and a number of horticultural books. With the success of the fourth book, a number of titles were re-printed, and some smaller puzzle books were produced. In 2013, Cole's Funny Little Picture Book was published, an abridged and updated version of the original Funny Picture Book.
