= Whistling Dick (cannon) =

Cannon in the American Civil War

- Type: Model 1839 18-pounder (presumed)
- Place of origin: United States of America

Service history
- In service: 1863
- Used by: Confederate States of America
- Wars: American Civil War

Specifications (based on Ripley's identification as an 18-pounder)
- Mass: c. 4,913 pounds (2,228 kg)
- Length: 123.25 inches (313.1 cm)
- Caliber: c. 5.3 inches (13 cm)

Whistling Dick was a cannon used by Confederate forces during the Siege of Vicksburg in the American Civil War. Named for the sound made when it fired, the cannon is believed to have been a rifled 18-pounder gun, which may have had banding on its breech as reinforcement. Historian Warren Ripley believes that Whistling Dick was most likely a Model 1839 gun, which would have been mostly obsolete by the time of the siege. The cannon believed to have been Whistling Dick dueled with Union Navy ships on May 22, 1863, before being transferred to a different location on May 29. The piece would have been captured by Union forces when the siege ended on July 4, 1863, and its fate is unknown. A cannon at the United States Military Academy was incorrectly identified as Whistling Dick, but historian Ed Bearss demonstrated that the USMA piece was actually another Confederate cannon from Vicksburg, the Widow Blakely.

== Description and use ==
Historian Ed Bearss notes that the history of Whistling Dick is filled with "legends, inaccuracies, and contradictions". A cannon used by Confederate troops during the Siege of Vicksburg in the American Civil War, the name "Whistling Dick" was used by both Confederate and Union soldiers. The name originated with the sound the cannon made when it fired. The Union references to Whistling Dick probably refer to multiple pieces, with those references relating to gun positions located across a 3-mile (4.8 km) stretch. Bearss describes the Union usage of the name as "a collective designation to a number of Confederate guns".

Memoirs written by Confederate soldier Lamar Fontaine imply the existence of two guns the Confederates called Whistling Dick, but Bearss notes that Fontaine's writings include a number of improbable claims and factual inaccuracies related to the alleged cannon. This leads Bearss to conclude that there was only one cannon that the Confederates actually referred to as Whistling Dick.

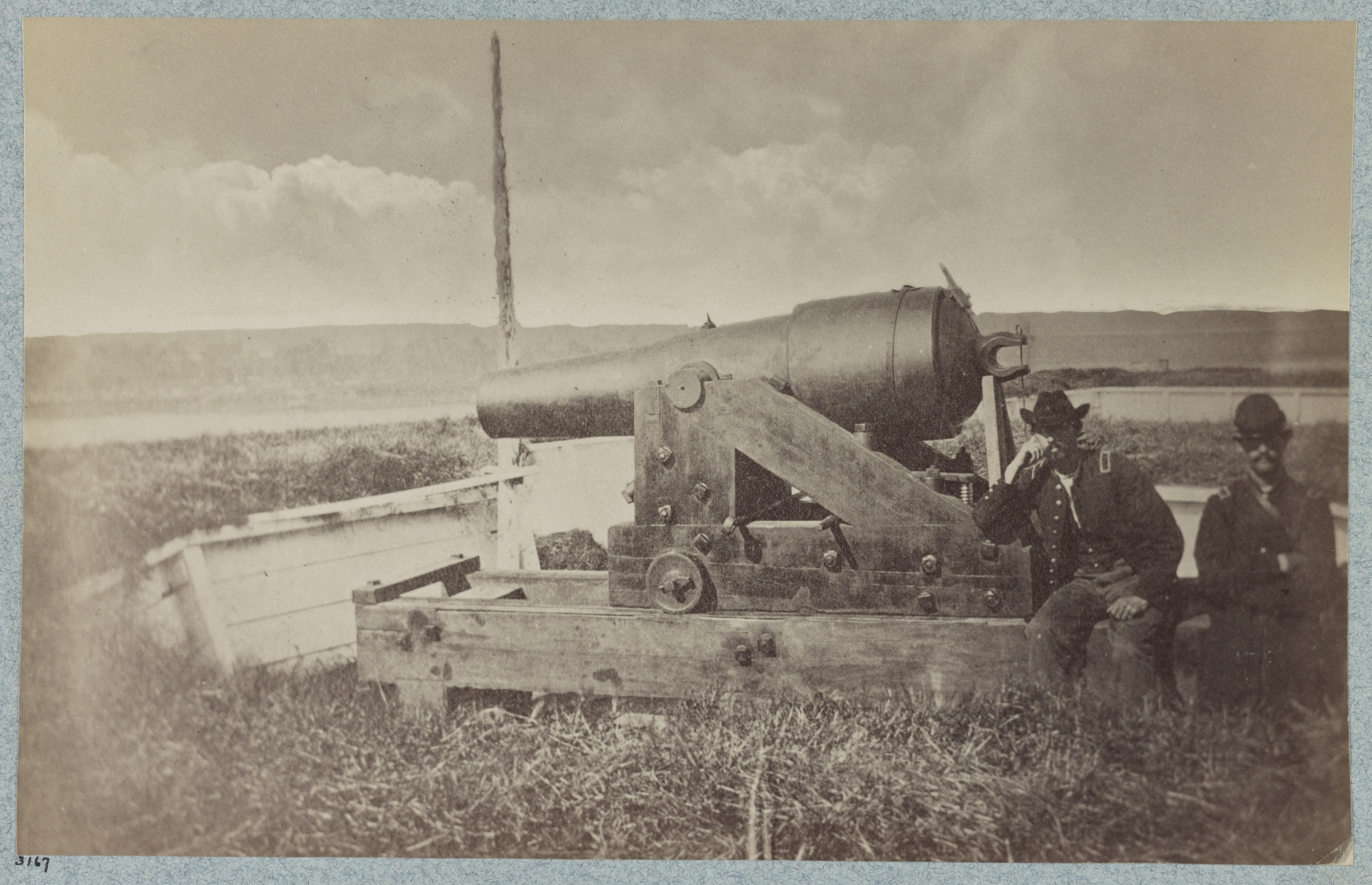
While this photograph has often been claimed to depict Whistling Dick, historian Warren Ripley has demonstrated that this identification is in error.

Confederate officers Edward Higgins and Samuel H. Lockett produced writings that identified Whistling Dick as an 18-pounder rifled cannon. Bearss notes the writings of Higgins and Lockett, as well as those of Confederate artilleryman A. L. Slack, and concludes that the true Whistling Dick was an 18-pounder rifled gun. Historian Warren Ripley refers to the identity as an 18-pounder as plausible. Slack had written in a newspaper article in 1900 that the gun had originally been a smoothbore before rifling was later applied to it and that its breech had been strengthened with banding. Ripley considers Slack's description to be probably accurate, although he also notes that the amount of time between the siege and the article means that the account may be in error on some points. In particular, he states that the claim of banding cannot be proven without locating the actual cannon. Ripley summarizes the available evidence as indicating that Whistling Dick was a rifled 18-pounder with breech banding. He further identifies the gun as most likely a Model 1839 cannon. Historian Kevin Dougherty accepts the identification as an 18-pounder converted smoothbore rifle with breech banding. A Model 1839 18-pounder gun would have been largely obsolete by the time of the siege. Slack wrote that Whistling Dick, "for a heavy siege gun, was of rather modest proportions".

In 1935, a Confederate veteran claimed that the gun had first entered Confederate service after it was captured in Virginia by Robert E. Lee's troops and then shipped west. At Vicksburg, Whistling Dick was part of a Louisiana artillery unit under the command of Lieutenant Colonel D. Beltzhoover. Bearss quotes from a tablet erected at Vicksburg National Military Park that had been vetted before placement by Confederate veterans that claimed that Whistling Dick had been emplaced in a battery from May 18 to May 28, 1863, near what was in 1957 Washington Street in Vicksburg. On May 22, the Confederate batteries dueled Union Navy ships. During the exchange, the sole 18-pounder in the Confederate batteries was damaged. The position of the Confederate batteries during the May 22 exchange limited their abilities to do damage, and the 18-pounder rifled gun was moved to a different location on May 29, behind the portion of the Confederate line held by Stephen D. Lee's men. Tommy Presson, writing for The Vicksburg Post, states that this rear location was near the 21st-century site of an administrative building owned by the Vicksburg-Warren School District. Whistling Dick would have been relinquished to Union troops on July 4, 1863, when the Confederate defenders of Vicksburg surrendered. In 1957, Bearss noted that a cannon displayed at the United States Military Academy was identified as Whistling Dick, but that the piece was actually a different cannon that the Confederates had named the Widow Blakeley. This piece was a 7.5-inch cannon, and by 1970 it had been transferred to Vicksburg, where it was known by its correct name. Presson speculates that the actual Whistling Dick would have been melted down after its capture due to its obsolescence.

== Sources ==
- Bearss, Edwin C. (1957). "The Vicksburg River Defenses and the Enigma of "Whistling Dick"". The Journal of Mississippi History. XIX (1): 21–30.
- Dougherty, Kevin (2010). Weapons of Mississippi. Jackson, Mississippi: University Press of Mississippi. ISBN 978-1-60473-452-2.
- Presson, Tommy (February 25, 2023). "Whistling Dick: The Legend of a 'Tortured Thing'". The Vicksburg Post.
- Ripley, Warren (1970). Artillery and Ammunition of the Civil War. New York, New York: Promontory Press. ISBN 0-88394-003-5.
