= All Quiet Along the Potomac =

"All Quiet Along the Potomac To-night"
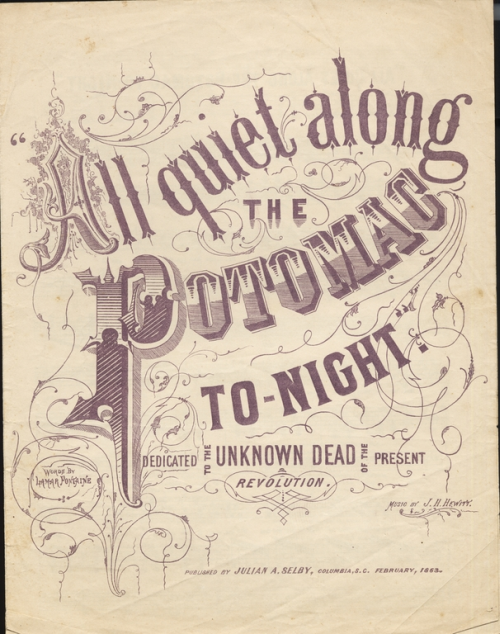
- Cover, sheet music, 1863

Song
- Language: English
- Published: 1863
- Songwriters: Composer: John Hill Hewittt; Lyricist: Ethel Lynn Beers

"All Quiet Along the Potomac," originally titled "The Picket Guard," is an 1861 poem by American writer Ethel Lynn Beers. Set somewhere along the titular Potomac River during the American Civil War, the poem follows a lone picket longing for home while on nighttime guard duty before he is shot by an unseen enemy.

The poem was set to music in 1863 by John Hill Hewitt.

== Overview ==
The poem was first published as "The Picket Guard" in the Harper's Weekly issue dated November 30, 1861. It attributed only to "E.B." It was reprinted broadly both with that attribution and without, leading to many spurious claims of authorship. Among those claiming authorship was Lamar Fontaine, then a private in the CSA. On July 4, 1863, Harper's Weekly told its readers that the poem had been written for the paper by a lady contributor whom it later identified as Beers.

The poem was based on newspaper reports of "all is quiet tonight", which was based on official telegrams sent to the Secretary of War by Major-General George B. McClellan following the First Battle of Bull Run. In September 1861, Beers noticed that one report was followed by a small item telling of a picket being killed. She wrote the poem that same morning.

== "The Picket-Guard" ==
"The Picket-Guard", Harper's Weekly, 1861:

“All quiet along the Potomac,” they say,
“Except, now and then, a stray picket
Is shot as he walks on his beat to and fro,
By a rifleman hid in the thicket.
’Tis nothing—a private or two, now and then,
Will not count in the news of the battle;
Not an officer lost—only one of the men
Moaning out, all alone, the death-rattle.”

All quiet along the Potomac to-night,
Where the soldiers lie peacefully dreaming;
Their tents, in the rays of the clear autumn moon
Or the light of the watch-fire, are gleaming.
A tremulous sign, as the gentle night-wind
Through the forest-leaves softly is creeping;
While stars up above, with their glittering eyes,
Keep guard—for the army is sleeping.

There’s only the sound of the lone sentry’s tread
As he tramps from the rock to the fountain,
And thinks of the two in the low trundle-bed
Far away in the cot on the mountain.
His musket falls slack—his face, dark and grim,
Grows gentle with memories tender,
As he mutters a prayer for the children asleep—
For their mother—may Heaven defend her !

The moon seems to shine just as brightly as then,
That night when the love yet unspoken
Leaped up to his lips—when low-murmured vows
Were pledged to be ever unbroken.
Then drawing his sleeve roughly over his eyes,
He dashes off tears that are welling,
And gathers his gun closer up to its place,
As if to keep down the heart-swelling.

He passes the fountain, the blasted pine-tree,
The footstep is lagging and weary;
Yet onward he goes, through the broad belt of light,
Toward the shade of the forest so dreary.
Hark ! was it the night-wind that rustled the leaves ?
Was it moonlight so wondrously flashing ?
It looked like a rifle— “ Ha ! Mary, good-by !”
And the life-blood is ebbing and plashing.

All quiet along the Potomac to-night,
No sound save the rush of the river;
While soft falls the dew on the face of the dead—
The picket’s off duty forever ! E. B.

== In other media ==
In 1863, the poem was set to music by John Hill Hewitt, himself a poet, newspaperman, and musician. The song was popularized by Hewitt as he traveled with the Queen Sisters as their songwriter, so popular that the publisher needed to go through five printings of the sheet music. As Hewitt developed into the "Bard of the Stars and Bars" and his music added a pro-Southern/Confederate sentiment, the song and poem within became known to pro-Confederate audiences as well as pro-Union ones.

The song may have inspired the title of the English translation of Erich Maria Remarque's World War I novel All Quiet on the Western Front. The poem and song were adapted into a 1913 American silent film titled The Picket Guard, directed by Allan Dwan and starring Wallace Reid as the picket guard.

=== Illustrations ===
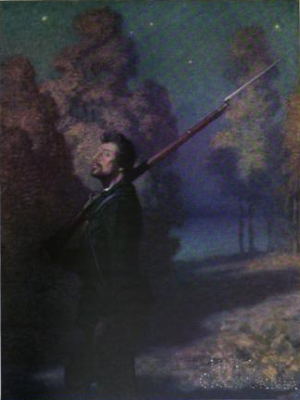
The Picket Guard—N.C. Wyeth, illustration for poem.

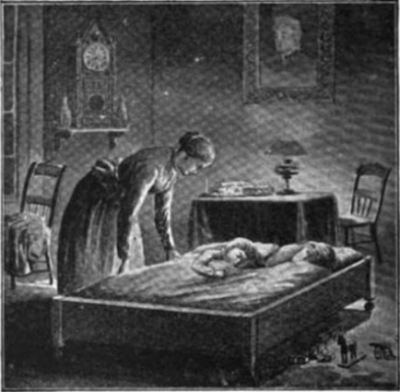
"And thinks of the two on the low trundle-bed."—Confederate illustration for poem.

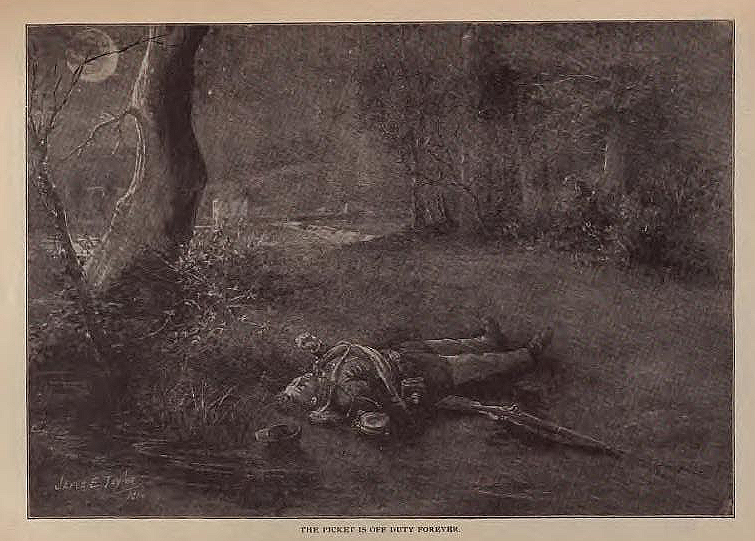
The Picket is Off Duty Forever—James E. Taylor, illustration for poem.

== See also ==
- List of anti-war songs
