= Ethel Lynn Beers =

American poet

Ethelinda Lynn Beers
- Born: Ethelinda Eliot; January 13, 1827; Goshen, New York
- Died: October 11, 1879 (aged 52)
- Occupation: Poet
- Spouse: William H. Beers

Ethel Lynn Beers (born Ethelinda Eliot; January 13, 1827 – October 11, 1879) was an American poet best known for her patriotic and sentimental Civil War poem "All Quiet Along the Potomac Tonight".

== Biography ==
Ethelinda Eliot was born in Goshen, New York on January 13, 1827. She was a descendant of Puritan missionary John Eliot. When she began writing and publishing, she signed her name as "Ethel Lynn" because she thought her last name was too "tame and commonplace". At age 19, she married William H. Beers and appended her married name to her poems. Her most famous poem, "All Quiet Along the Potomac Tonight", first appeared in Harper's Weekly on November 30, 1861, under the title "The Picket Guard".

Her poems — including other notable works like "Weighing the Baby", "Which Shall It Be?", and "Baby Looking Out For Me" — appeared in many publications, most frequently the New York Ledger. In 1863 she published General Frankie: a Story for Little Folks. She feared publishing her collected works as she thought she would die after its publication, a premonition which came true. The day after the publication of All Quiet Along the Potomac and Other Poems, she died in Orange, New Jersey, aged 52.

== Publications ==
- Noonday Rest (1869)
- All Quiet Along the Potomac and Other Poems (1879)
