= Gunnar Sætren =

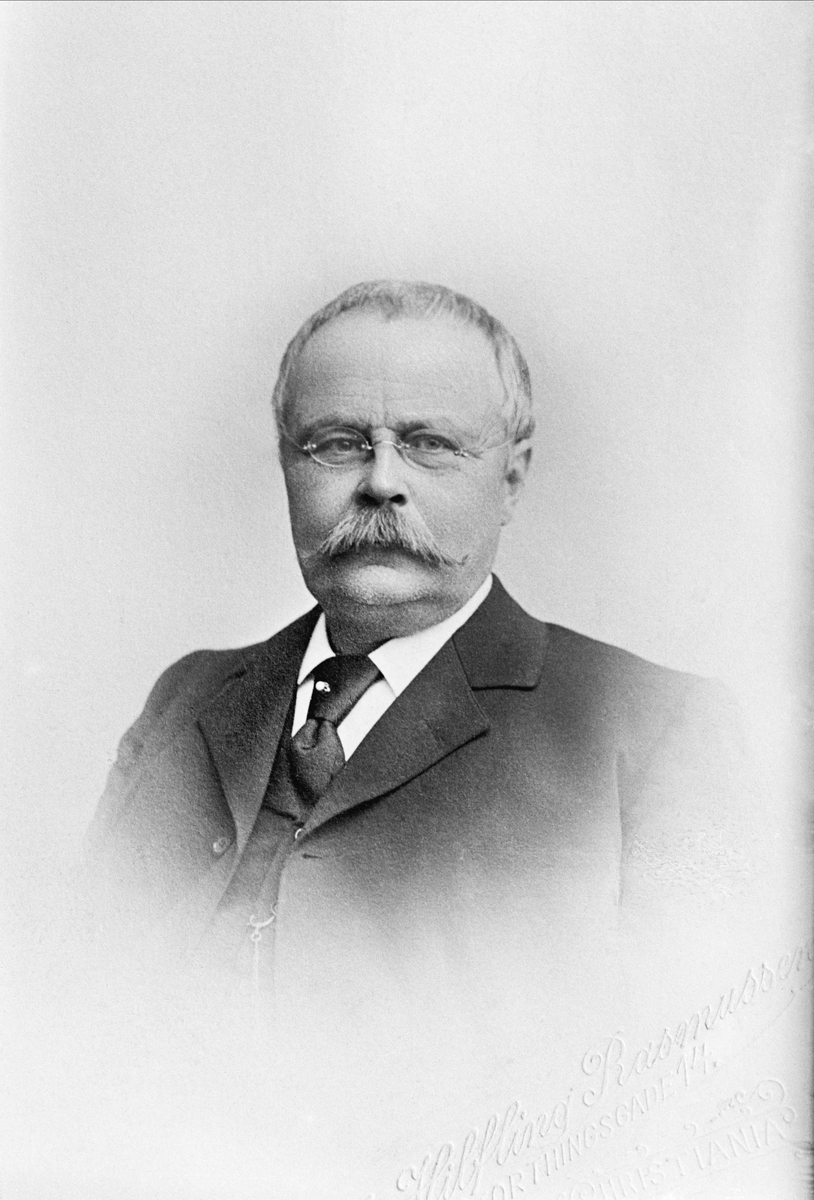
- Born: 7 September 1843
- Died: 10 November 1928 (aged 85)
- Occupations: Engineer, manager, magazine editor
- Known for: Important figure at Kanalvæsenet for more than 40 years

Gunnar Sætren (7 September 1843 – 10 November 1928) was a Norwegian engineer, manager and magazine editor. He was an important figure at Kanalvæsenet for more than forty years, and made several contributions to the exploitation of Norwegian water resources.

== Personal life ==
Sætren was born in Elverum as the son of farmer Carsten Sæthren and Kari Nordby. He married Inger Marie Gundersen in 1897. He died in Aker Municipality in 1928.

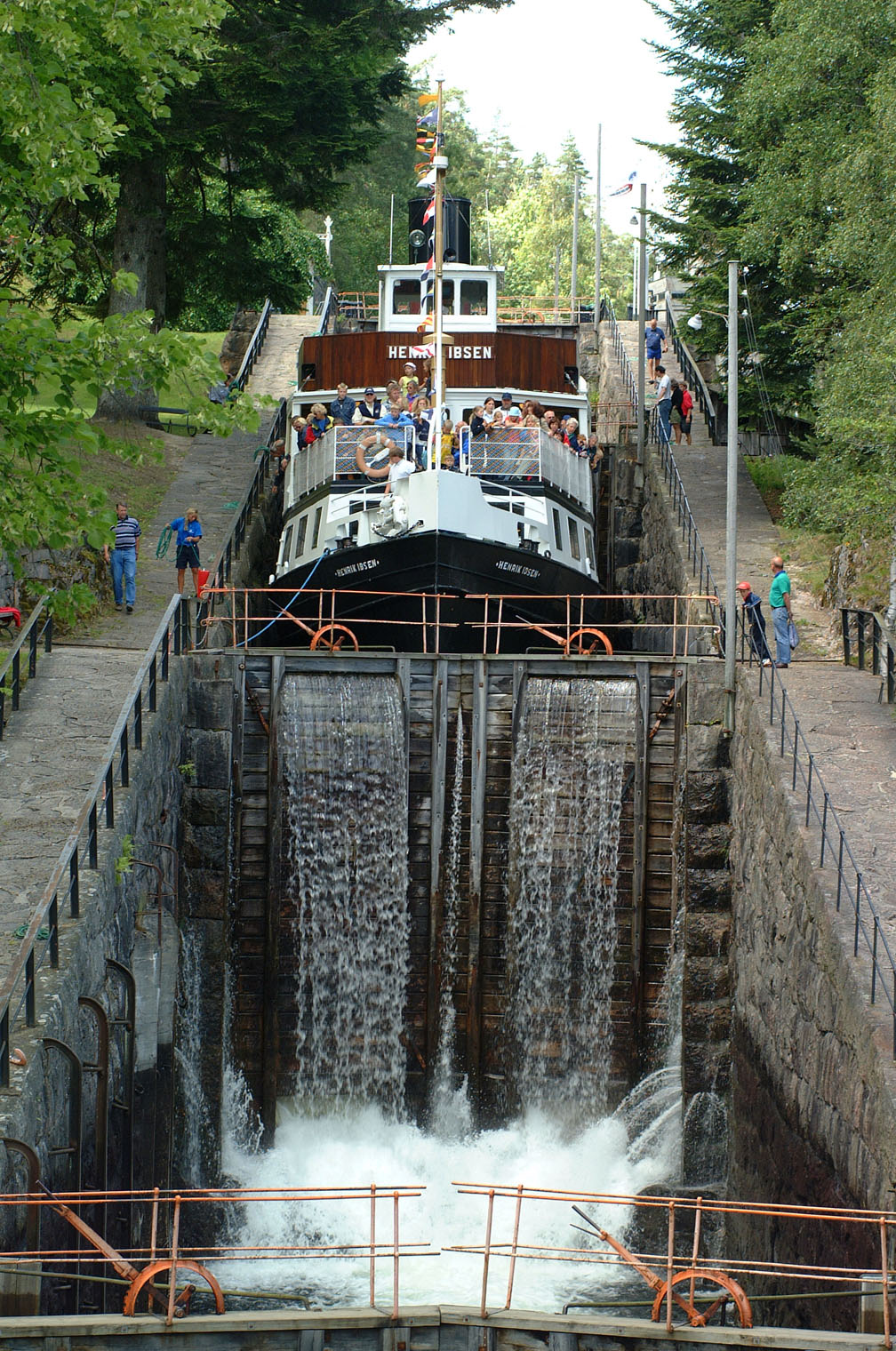
Canal lock at the Bandak-Norsjø Canal

== Career ==
Sætren studied at Lillehammer Latin- og Realskole, at Qvams skole in Christiania and at the Swiss Federal Institute of Technology Zurich from 1862 to 1865. In 1866 he started working as a draftsman for Kanalvæsenet, the body for exploitation of Norwegian water resources, and held various positions at Kanalvæsenet over a period of 41 years. He ended his career as manager for the Bandak-Norsjø Canal from 1891 to 1907. The boat locks of the Bandak-Norsjø Canal could lift boats with a length of up to 100 feet. The canal became an important water transport system, and also a tourist destination. Sætren was a counsellor for industrialist Sam Eyde, the founder and first manager of Norsk Hydro, who acquired rights for exploiting waterfalls for hydroelectric power. Sætren published maps and overviews of water resources in Norway, such as his map Hydrografisk kart over det sydlige Norge from 1904. He was the first editor of the magazine Norsk Teknisk Tidsskrift, which he edited from 1883 to 1886. He was also a proponent for the construction of the Holmenkoll Line, and chaired the board of directors for ten years from 1896. He was decorated Knight of the Royal Norwegian Order of St. Olav in 1893.
