= Robert Mullen (Nevada politician) =

American politician

Member of the Nevada Senate from the Nye County district
- In office November 4, 1868 – November 5, 1872
- Preceded by: Frank M. Proctor
- Succeeded by: D. P. Walter

Personal details
- Party: Democratic

Robert Mullen was a Democratic state senator. On November 3, 1868, he was elected member of the Nevada Senate, representing Nye County. Mullen's term started the next day and he served in two regular sessions until the next election in November 1872. In 1870, he was also appointed to a local committee to ascertain means of facilitating the construction of a railroad in his region of the state.

In 1872, it was reported that Mullen was "about to leave Nevada for the East".
