= Yngvar Nielsen =

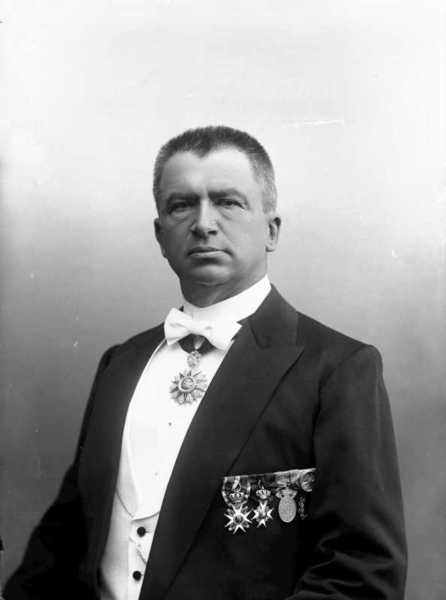
- Yngvar Nielsen in 1898
- Born: July 29, 1843; Arendal, Aust-Agder
- Died: 2 March 1916 (aged 72)
- Occupations: Historian, politician, geographer

Yngvar Nielsen (29 July 1843 in Arendal, Aust-Agder – 2 March 1916) was a Norwegian historian, politician, geographer and pioneer of tourism in Norway.

== Selected works ==
- En Christianiensers Erindringer (1910)
- Under Oscar IIs Regjering (1912)
- Fra Johan Sverdrups Dage (1913)
- Da Unionen skulde briste (1915)
