= The Historians' History of the World =

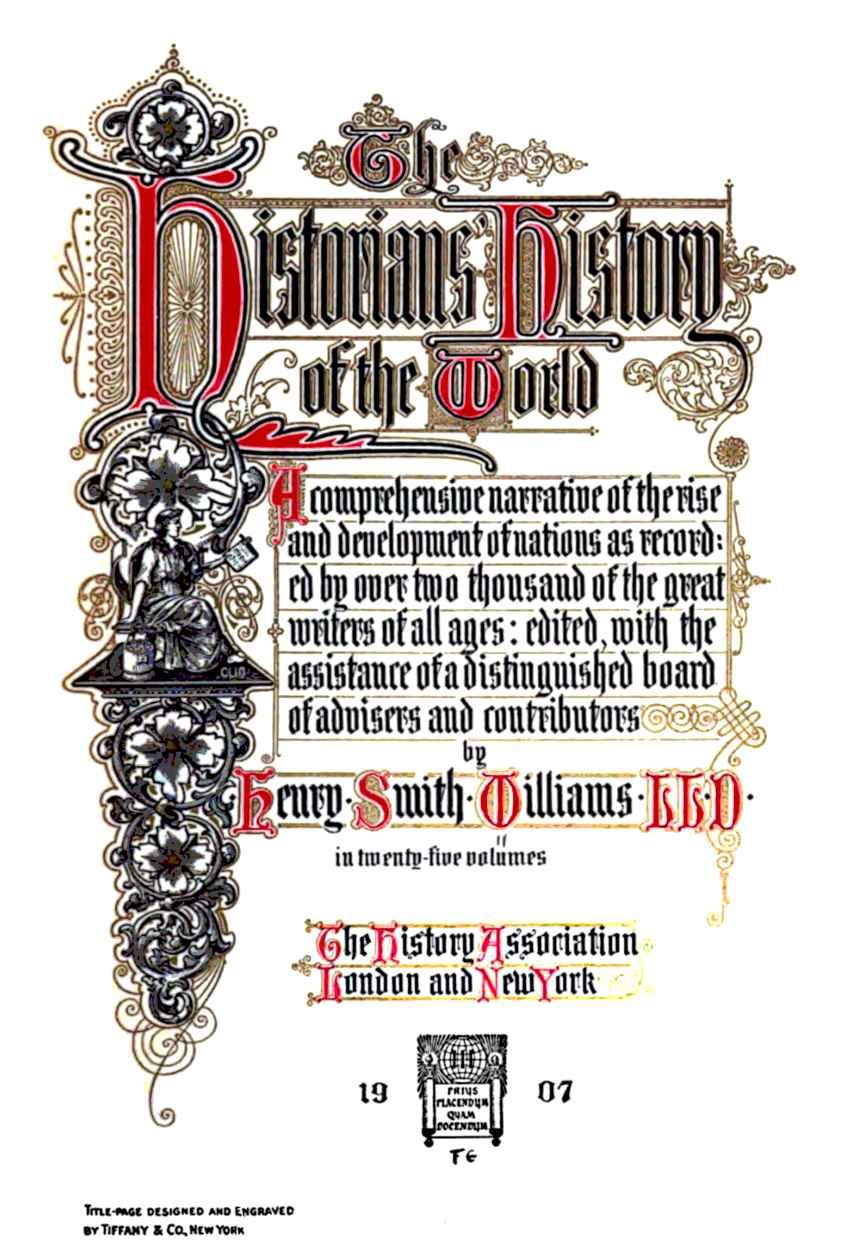
- Title page
- Editor: Henry Smith Williams
- Language: English
- Subject: World history
- Genre: Encyclopedia
- Publication date: 1902

The Historians' History of the World, subtitled A Comprehensive Narrative of the Rise and Development as Recorded by over two thousand of the Great Writers of all Ages', is a 25-volume encyclopedia of world history, published in 1902. It was compiled by Henry Smith Williams, a medical doctor and author of many books on medicine, science, and history, as well as other authorities on history including historian Walter L. Fleming, and Rupert Hughes as editor.

== List of volumes ==
Part	Based on authors or works including	Topics covered
I: Prolegomena, Egypt, Mesopotamia
I: Prolegomena		Prefatory discussion on various topics relating to the practice of historical study
II: Egypt		Ancient Egypt
III: Mesopotamia		Mesopotamia
II: Israel, India, Persia, Phoenicia, minor nations of Western Asia
IV: The History of Israel	Ernest Babelon, The Bible, Thomas Kelly Cheyne, Maximilian Wolfgang Duncker, Heinrich Ewald, Edward Gibbon, Ferdinand Hitzig, Johann Jahn, Josephus, Rudolf Kittel, Eugène Ledrain, Max Loehr, Louis Ménard, Henry Hart Milman, Salomon Munk, Francis William Newman, Ernest Renan, Archibald Sayce, George Adam Smith, Bernhard Stade	Biblical history of Abraham and the early Israelites, Moses, the Judges, Samuel, Saul, David, Nehemiah, the Maccabean Revolt, early Christianity, the Fall of Jerusalem
V: The History of Phoenicia	Arnold Hermann Ludwig Heeren, John Kenrick, Otto Meltzer, Theodor Mommsen, Franz Karl Movers, Richard Pietschmann	The origins of the people of Phoenicia, and their rise to maritime supremacy under Hiram I and his successors, Phoenicia under the Persians and Greeks the history of Carthage and its decline with the Punic Wars
VI: The History of Western Asia	Ernest Babelon, Maximilian Wolfgang Duncker, Eduard Meyer, Georges Perrot & Charles Chipiez, Georges Radet, A.H. Sayce, Albert Socin	The story of the Hittites, the Scythians, the Cimmerians, the Lydians and a handful of other peoples of the Ancient Near East
VII: The History of Ancient India	Arrian, Gustave Le Bon, Eugene Bournouf, Mountstuart Elphinstone, William Wilson Hunter, William Jones, Ferdinand Justi, Salomon Lefmann, James Mill, Vedas, H. H. Wilson	The early Hindus, the Vedas, the Brahmins, the rise of Buddhism
VIII: The History of Ancient Persia	Ctesias, Herodotus, Gaston Maspero, Theodor Nöldeke, Henry Creswicke Rawlinson	The Achaemenid Empire, the Medes, Elamites, the civilization of Persia under Cyrus the Great and Darius I, Xerxes I and Artaxerxes III, the fall of the empire
III: Greece to the Peloponnesian war
IV: Greece
V: The Roman Republic
	Ammianus Marcellinus, Appian, Thomas Arnold, the Augustan History, Julius Caesar, Henry Fynes Clinton, Cicero, Cassius Dio, Dionysius of Halicarnassus, Eutropius, Florus, Victor Gardthausen, Edward Gibbon, Adolf von Harnack, Gustav Hertzberg, Herodian, Otto Hirschfeld, Thomas Hodgkin, Karl Hoeck, Wilhelm Ihne, Jordanes, Josephus, George Cornewall Lewis, Henry Liddell, Livy, Joachim Marquardt, Charles Merivale, Eduard Meyer, Theodor Mommsen, Monumentum Ancyranaum, Cornelius Nepos, Barthold Georg Niebuhr, Pliny the Elder, Pliny the Younger, Plutarch, Polybius, Leopold von Ranke, Sallust, Strabo, Suetonius, Tacitus, Louis-Sébastien Le Nain de Tillemont, Velleius Paterculus, Georg Weber, Zosimus	Early legends of the Founding of Rome and of the Roman Kingdom, the Roman Republic's development and rise to supremacy via the Punic Wars, Samnite Wars, Macedonian Wars, and the Roman conquest of Italy, the final days of the Republic, the reforms of Tiberius Gracchus, Gaius Gracchus, and Gaius Marius and his conflict with Sulla following the Jugurthine War in Africa, the rise of Pompey and his war against Julius Caesar, the Second Catilinarian conspiracy, the Crisis of the Roman Republic and its fall
VI: The early Roman empire
		Augustus, the fall of the Western Roman Empire, the rise of Christianity, the many emperors who held power in Rome during the founding and the fall of the Roman Empire, the division of the Roman Empire and the many barbarian invasions (Huns, Goths, Vandals) leading up to Rome's fall
VII: The later Roman Empire
Part XI, The History of the Later Roman Empire, Book I: The Later Roman Empire in the East	Agathias, Appian, the Augustan History, J. B. Bury, Henry Fynes Clinton, George Kedrenos, Anna Komnene, Cassius Dio, Doukas (historian), Einhard, Eutropius, George Finlay, Heinrich Gelzer, Edward Gibbon, Wilhelm von Giesebrecht, Ferdinand Gregorovius, Gustav Hertzberg, Thomas Hodgkin, Jordanes, John Malalas, Procopius, Leopold von Ranke, Strabo, Tacitus, Velleius Paterculus, Georg Weber, Joannes Zonaras, Zosimus	the reign of Arcadius in 395, deals with the Eastern Roman Empire through to the Fall of Constantinople in 1453, detailing as well the Siege of Constantinople (1204) by the members of the Fourth Crusade which led to the short-lived Latin Empire along with the various incidents in the history of Constantinople with several chapters dedicated to Justinian I
Part XI, The History of the Later Roman Empire, Book II: The Later Roman Empire in the West	As above	Odoacer and the Visigoths' invasion of Italy, the Lombard invasion of Italy, the Carolingian dynasty, Charlemagne, the birth of the Holy Roman Empire, the Investiture controversy, Henry V, Holy Roman Emperor
VIII: Parthians, Sassanids, and Arabs, the Crusades and the Papacy
XII: The History of the Parthians, Sassanids, and Arabs	Abd al-Latif al-Baghdadi, Bar Hebraeus, Abulfeda, Maximilian Wolfgang Duncker, Ignác Goldziher, Alfred von Gutschmid, William Muir, Theodor Nöldeke, Louis-Pierre-Eugène Sédillot, Julius Wellhausen, Gustav Weil	The Parthian Empire, the conquests of Mithridates I of Parthia, the Mithridatic Wars with Mithridates VI of Pontus, the Sasanian Empire and the continuation of the Roman–Persian Wars, the Hephthalite–Persian Wars, the history of Pre-Islamic Arabia, Muhammad and the spread of Islam, the Umayyad Caliphate, the Abbasid Caliphate, the medieval history of Islam in Spain, Fiqh (Islamic jurisprudence)
XIII: The History of the Crusades and of the Papacy	Abu'l-Fida, Choiseul, Baha ad-Din ibn Shaddad, James Bryce, William Denton, John William Draper, Einhard, Edward Gibbon, Johann Karl Ludwig Gieseler, Henry Hallam, Henry Charles Lea, Joseph François Michaud, Charles Mills (historian), Henry Hart Milman, Johann Lorenz von Mosheim, Leopold von Ranke, Geoffrey of Villehardouin	The Crusades, the history of the papacy
IX: Italy
	Ammirato, Jacob Burckhardt, Samuel Astley Dunham, Francesco Guicciardini, William Carew Hazlitt, Anna Komnene, Heinrich Leo, Niccolò Machiavelli, Henry Edward Napier, Alfred von Reumont, William Roscoe, Jean Charles Léonard de Sismondi, John Addington Symonds, Voltaire	
X: Spain and Portugal
XV: The History of Spain and Portugal, Book I	Pero López de Ayala, Reinier Cornelis Bakhuizen van den Brink, Hermann Baumgarten, Samuel Astley Dunham, Martin Sharp, William Francis Patrick Napier, William H. Prescott, Jerónimo Zurita y Castro	Spain's earliest known history under the Celts, the Phoenicians, the Ancient Greeks through to the Roman conquest of Hispania, the Gothic invasion, the Muslim conquest of the Iberian Peninsula and their later overthrow, the Kingdom of Aragon and Kingdom of Castile, the reigns of Ferdinand II of Aragon, Isabella I of Castile, and the monarchs of Habsburg Spain; the House of Bourbon during the French Revolution, the Peninsular War, the regency of Maria Christina of Austria
XV: The History of Spain and Portugal, Book II	As above	The history of Portugal beginning with Afonso I of Portugal, other kings including Afonso II of Portugal, Denis of Portugal, and John I of Portugal, the role of Portugal in the Age of Discovery, Portuguese India, the Portuguese conquest of Goa, the decline of Portugal as a major European power, the 1755 Lisbon earthquake, Napoleon's invasion of Portugal, the reign of Carlos I of Portugal, the Inquisition, Catharism, the Waldensians and the Albigensian Crusade, the history of the Jews in Spain, the auto-da-fé, Tomás de Torquemada
XI: France, 843–1715
XVI: The History of France	Louis Pierre Édouard, Baron Bignon, Louis Blanc, Jean-Baptiste Honoré Raymond Capefigue, Thomas Carlyle, Hippolyte Castille, Symphorien Champier, François-René de Chateaubriand, Pierre Adolphe Chéruel, John Wilson Croker, Philippe de Commines, Edmond Jurien de La Gravière, Alexis de Tocqueville, Victor Duruy, Gabriel-Henri Gaillard, François Guizot, Ernest Hamel, Ludwig Häusser, Karl Hillebrand, Alphonse de Lamartine, Jules Michelet, Enguerrand de Monstrelet, Guillaume de Nangis, Jules Quicherat, Alfred Nicolas Rambaud, Edmond Henri Adolphe Schérer, Walter Scott, Charles Seignobos, Jean Charles Léonard de Sismondi, Albert Sorel, Heinrich von Sybel, Adolphe Thiers, Voltaire	The later Carolingian dynasty, the foundation of the House of Capet, the rise of the House of Valois, the Hundred Years' War, Cardinal Mazarin, Cardinal Richelieu, the House of Bourbon, the death of Louis XIV
XII: France, 1715–1815
XVII		The early years of Louis XV, Madame de Pompadour, Voltaire, Louis XVI and Marie Antoinette, the French Revolution under Honoré Gabriel Riqueti, comte de Mirabeau, the Execution of Louis XVI and the Girondins, the Reign of Terror, the rise of Napoleon, the Napoleonic Wars, the Treaties of Tilsit, the Battle of Waterloo
XIII: France, 1815–1904; Netherlands
XIV: The Netherlands (concluded), the Germanic empires
XVIII: The History of the Germanic Empires	Alfred von Arneth, Adolf Beer, Friedrich Karl Biedermann, Thomas Carlyle, Robert Buckley Comyn, William Coxe, Mandell Creighton, Hans Delbrück, Eduard Duller, Heinrich Theodor Flathe, Frederick II, Bruno Gebhardt, Johann Karl Ludwig Gieseler, Anton Gindely, Karl Rudolf Hagenbach, James Wycliffe Headlam-Morley, Otto Kaemmel, Friedrich Kohlrausch, Reinhold Koser, Franz Krones, Karl Gotthard Lamprecht, János Majláth, Wolfgang Menzel, Wilhelm Oncken, Johann David Erdmann Preuß, Hans Prutz, Leopold von Ranke, Heinrich von Sybel, Heinrich von Treitschke, Georg Waitz	The Netherlands from 1722: William IV, Prince of Orange, the Treaty of Aix-la-Chapelle, the Fourth Anglo-Dutch War, the impact of the French Revolution on the Netherlands and its absorption into the First French Empire, the ministry of Johan Rudolph Thorbecke, Wilhelmina of the Netherlands, the role of Belgium during the War of the Austrian Succession, the Brabant Revolution, the Belgian Revolution, the reigns of Leopold I of Belgium and Leopold II of Belgium
Book I: The Holy Roman Empire	As above	The Hohenstaufens, Lothair II, Holy Roman Emperor, Conrad III of Germany and his Second Crusade, Frederick Barbarossa, Holy Roman Emperor and his conflicts with the Pope, the Peace of Constance, the Third Crusade, Frederick II, Holy Roman Emperor and the Sixth Crusade, the House of Habsburg, Rudolf I of Germany, Charles IV, Holy Roman Emperor, Sigismund, Holy Roman Emperor, the rise of the Hanseatic League, the Swabian League, and the Hussites, Frederick III, Holy Roman Emperor, Maximilian I, Holy Roman Emperor and the Diet of Worms, and to Martin Luther and the Protestant Reformation; the Schmalkaldic War, the Protestant Union, the Thirty Years' War, the Grand Alliance, the Treaty of Ryswick, the Treaty of Passarowitz, the Treaty of Versailles, the Seven Years' War, the reign of Maria Theresa, the decline of the Holy Roman Empire, the Treaty of Reichenbach, Leopold II, Holy Roman Emperor, the Second Congress of Rastatt, the abdication of Francis II, Holy Roman Emperor
Book II: The Empire of Austria-Hungary	As above	The Napoleonic Wars, Klemens von Metternich, the Treaty of Paris, the Prague uprising of 1848, the Hungarian Revolution of 1848 and its declaration of independence, the Battle of Novara
XV: Germanic empires (concluded)
XVI: Scandinavia, Switzerland to 1715
XIX: The History of Scandinavia	Adam of Bremen, Carl Ferdinand Allen, Jean-Pierre Guillaume Catteau-Calleville, Andrew Crichton, Olof von Dalin, Samuel Astley Dunham, Anders Fryxell, Erik Gustaf Geijer, Samuel Laing, Sven Lagerbring, Paul Henri Mallet, Oscar Montelius, Friedrich Münter, Erik Pontoppidan, Snorri Sturluson, H. von Treitschke, Henry Wheaton	
XX: The History of Switzerland	W. A. B. Coolidge, Karl Dändliker, Johannes Dierauer, Johann Karl Ludwig Gieseler, Johannes von Müller, Wilhelm Oechsli, Élisée Reclus, Johannes Strickler Johannes Vitoduranus, Louis Vulliemin	
XVII–XXVII
XVII: Switzerland (concluded), Russia and Poland; XVIII: England to 1485; XIX England, 1485–1642; XX: England, 1642–1791; XXI: Scotland, Ireland, England since 1792; XXII: The British colonies, the United States (early colonial period); XXII supplement: Australia and New Zealand; XXIII: The United States (concluded), Spanish America; XXIV: Poland, the Balkans, Turkey, minor Eastern states, China, Japan; XXV: Index; XXVI-XXVII: These eventful years, parts I and II: additional volumes in the 5th edition of 1926, dealing with the First World War

== Reception ==
The Spectator, writing on 25 January 1908 and prior to the release of the second half of the series, notes a handful of shortcomings including a fleeting portrayal of Homer and a questioning of the historicity of Christ, but states that "the general reader...will find here a great treasury of knowledge" and that "they form an extremely interesting shelfful."
