= Gustav Hertzberg =

German historian, author and publicist (1826–1907)

Gustav Friedrich Hertzberg
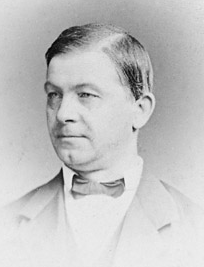
- Born: 19 January 1826
- Died: 16 November 1907 (aged 81)
- Occupations: Historian, publicist, author
- Title: Honorary Professor of History in the University of Halle; Chairman of the Saxon-Thuringian History Association
- Spouses: Rosalie Zimmerman (1854-1859); Auguste Ziebarth (1862-death)

Academic background
- Education: University of Halle
- Alma mater: University of Leipzig, University of Halle

Academic work
- Discipline: Classical and Regional Historian
- Institutions: University of Halle

Gustav Friedrich Hertzberg (19 January 1826 in Halle – 16 November 1907 in Halle) was a German historian, author and publicist. He was the Honorary Professor of History at the University of Halle from 1889 until shortly before his death.

== Early life and education ==
Hertzberg was the eldest son Gustav Ludwig Hertzberg and his wife, the former Friederike Bucholz. From 1835 to 1843 he attended the Pedagogium of the Francke Foundations, where his father worked as a doctor, and passed his Abitur there at the age of 17. He then studied theology at the University of Halle-Wittenberg. In the autumn of 1844 he began studying oriental and ancient philology at the University of Leipzig. He returned to the University of Halle in 1847, where Gottfried Bernhardy and Heinrich Leo were among his teachers. Hertzberg received his doctorate in philosophy on November 30, 1848.

== Career ==
In 1850 he passed the state examination and took up a position as an assistant teacher at the Pedagogy of the Francke Foundations, where he taught until 1855. In 1851 Hertzberg habilitated at the University of Halle with the writing De rebus Graecorum inde ab Achaici foederis interitu usque ad Antoninorum aetatem for the subject of ancient history. In 1854 he joined the Masonic lodge "Zu den Drei Degen", where he held the position of speaker for 24 years. He was summoned to Berlin in 1858 by the Prussian Minister of Education, Moritz August von Bethmann-Hollweg. There Hertzberg worked as the editor for the Preußische Wochenblatt until 1860. From 1866 to 1871 he also worked as an editor for the national Liberal Hallisches Tageblatt.

=== University of Halle ===
Hertzberg returned to Halle and was appointed adjunct professor of ancient history on April 4, 1860. The philosophical faculty applied for a full professorship several times (1875 and 1882) in vain. In 1889 a professorship was established for the subject, which was then transferred to Eduard Meyer, and Hertzberg received the status of a full honorary professor in the same year. Hertzberg was also a member of the Historical Commission of the Province of Saxony (from 1895) as well as Chairman of the Saxon-Thuringian History Association.

=== Awards ===
In 1901, Gustav Friedrich Hertzberg was awarded honorary citizenship by the city of Halle on the occasion of his 50th doctoral jubilee. Five years later, on the occasion of his 80th birthday, he was honored with the naming of a street in Halle and the awarding of the title of Privy Councilor, which he had been intended to receive 10 years earlier, but which he had rejected. In addition, Hertzberg was a bearer of the Red Eagle Order 4th class and the Prussian Order of the Crown 3rd class.

== Personal life ==
Hertzberg married Rosalie Zimmerman in 1854. They had two daughters and a son. Rosalie died in 1859 while giving birth to their son, Heinrich. Hertzberg remarried in Auguste Ziebarth in 1862; the couple had one daughter. Hertzberg was a member of the National Liberal Party.

== Death ==
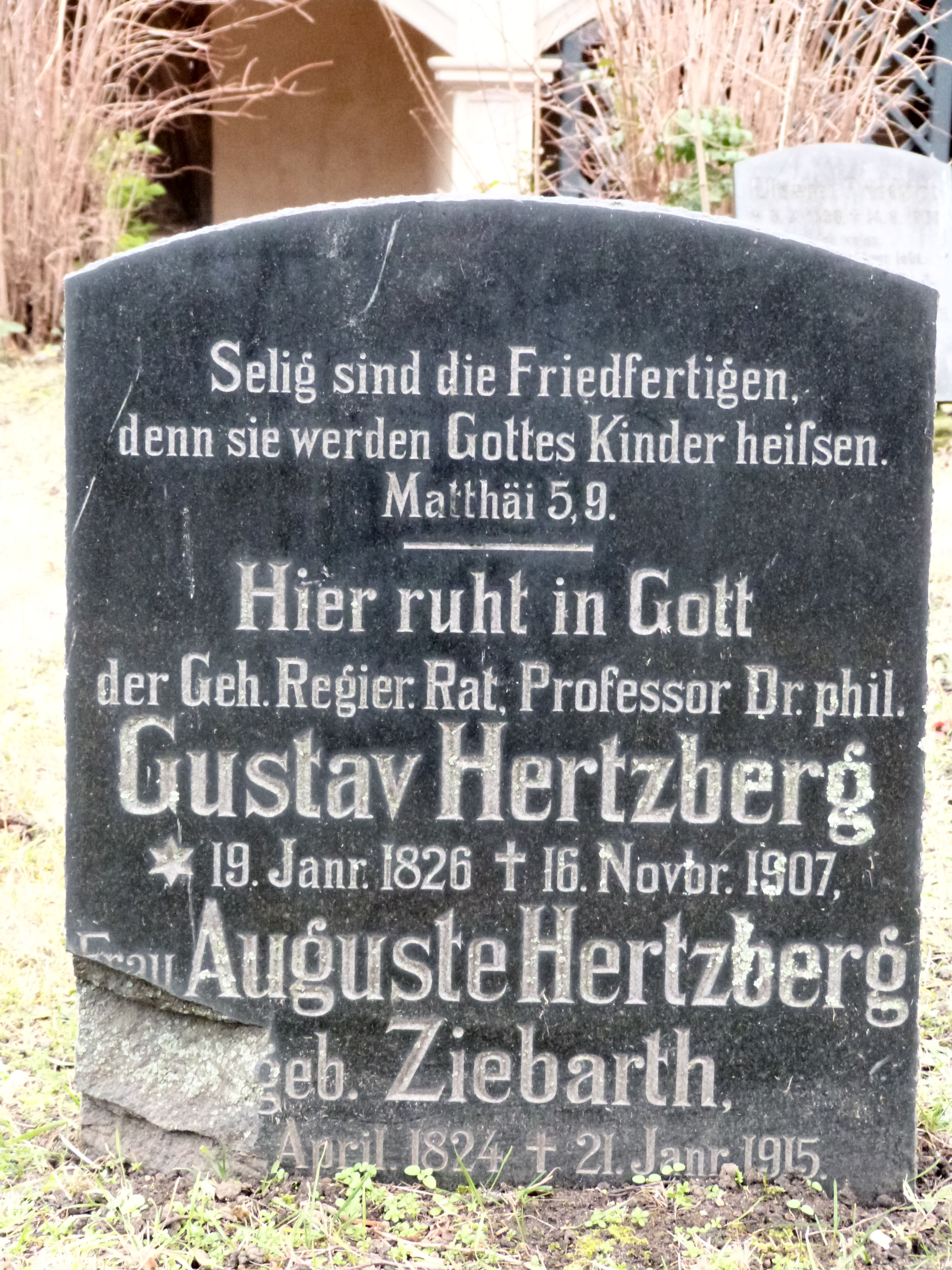
Grave of Gustav Hertzberg at the Stadtgottesacker in Halle

Hertzberg continued to lecture until shortly before his death. He died on November 16, 1907, and was buried in the Stadtgottesacker, a famous cemetery in Halle built in 1557. On November 16, 2007, the 100th anniversary of his death, a commemorative plaque was unveiled at his death house at Bernburger Strasse 2 in Halle.

== Literary activity ==
Hertzberg wrote primarily on the history of Ancient Greece and Rome as well as on the Byzantine Empire.

- Die Geschichte Griechenlands unter der Herrschaft der Römer, 1866–75, (3 volumes).
  - Volume 1: Von Flaminius bis auf Augustus.
  - Volume 2: Von Augustus bis auf Septimius Severus.
  - Volume 3: Von Septimius Severus bis auf Justinian.
- Geschichte von Hellas und Rom, 1879, (2 volumes).
- Geschichte des römischen Kaiserreiches, 1880.
- Geschichte der Byzantiner und des Osmanischen Reiches bis gegen Ende des sechszehnten Jahrhunderts, 1883.
- Geschichte der Römer im Altertum, 1885
- "Ancient Greece", Translated by Charles Forster Smith; first published in 1902.

He published a German translation of Victor Duruy's "Histoire des Romains" ("Geschichte des romischen Kaiserreichs", etc.) and made contributions to Wilhelm Oncken's "Allgemeine Geschichte in Einzeldarstellungen", to Heeren and Ukert's "Geschichte der Europäischen Staaten" and to Hans Prutz' "Illustrierte Weltgeschichte".

Hertzberg gained regional importance with his works on the history of his home town, particularly the three-volume History of the City of Halle an der Saale (1889–1893).

== References and external links ==
- Gustav Hertzberg in the German National Library catalogue
- catalogus-professorum-halensis
