= Mary Collins =

Mary Collins may refer to:

- Mary Collins (First Lady of Boston) (1920–2010)
- Mary Collins (politician) (born 1940), Canadian politician
- Mary Collins (missionary) (1846–1920), American who worked among the Sioux
- Mary Call Darby Collins (1911–2009), widow of governor LeRoy Collins and first lady of Florida, 1955–1961
- Mary Collins (immunologist), British immunologist at University College London
- Mary Collins (psychologist) (1895–1989), psychology lecturer at the University of Edinburgh
- Mary Collins Whiting (1835–1912), American lawyer, businesswoman, and teacher
- Mary Ammirato-Collins (1908–?), American artist
- Mary Jean Collins (born 1939), American feminist
- Mary Teresa Collins (born 1960s), Irish Traveller abuse survivor and activist
- Bo Derek (born Mary Cathleen Collins in 1956), American actress
- Mary C. Rabbitt (born Mary Priscilla Collins; 1915–2002), American geophysicist, administrator, and historian
- Mary Collins (theologian) (1935–2024)

== Fictional characters ==
- Mary Lou Collins, in the US TV sitcom The Larry Sanders Show, played by Mary Lynn Rajskub

== See also ==
- Collins (surname)
