= Hausser =

Hausser or Häusser is a surname, and may refer to:

- Elias David Häusser (1687–1745), German-Danish architect
- Gérard Hausser (1941–2025), French footballer
- Ludwig Häusser (1818–1867), German historian
- Paul Hausser (1880–1972), German officer in World War II
