= Fred C. Aiken House =

Historic house in Florida, United States

- U.S. National Register of Historic Places
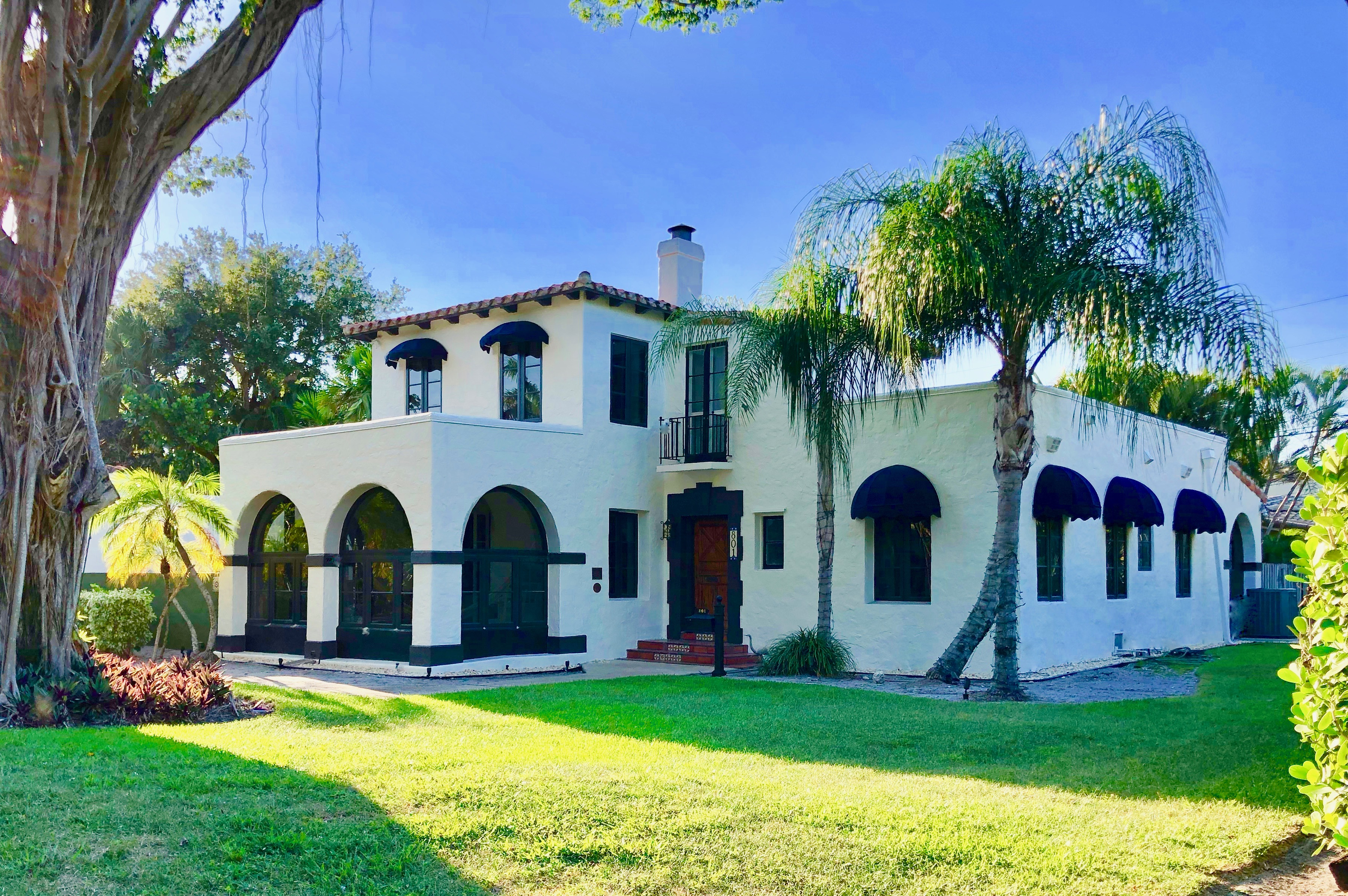
- The house, seen in 2008

- Location within Florida Location within the United States
- Location: 801 Hibiscus Street, Boca Raton, Florida
- Coordinates: 26°21′11.32″N 80°06′09.03″W
- Area: less than one acre
- Built: 1926
- Built by: Mizner Development Corp.
- Architect: Addison Mizner
- Architectural style: Late 19th And 20th Century Revivals, Mediterranean Revival
- NRHP reference No.: 92001271
- Added to NRHP: September 24, 1992

The Fred C. Aiken House is an example of Addison Mizner's Mediterranean-inspired architecture from 1925. This historically designated residence is Located at the corner of Paloma Avenue and Hibiscus Street, in the Old Floresta Historic District in Boca Raton, Florida. As of 2025, it remains a private residence and is now on sale.

== Description and history ==
Fred C. Aiken was a film industry executive who moved with his wife Lottie to Boca Raton FL in the late 1920s. In 1929. Mr. Aiken became Boca Raton's third Mayor, and served until 1938. He then held the position of town clerk for 10 years after that, ultimately living in this house for 31 years.

The Fred C. Aiken House, nestled in the heart of the historic neighborhood of Old Floresta, an example of Mediterranean Revival style by American architect Addison Mizner. Spanish hand made Clay Roofs, frame wood structure and stucco, Dade pine floors, perky cypress doors and ceilings, and Spanish decorative tiles are common in these houses. There were 29 Mizner-designed Spanish-style houses in Old Floresta. Few of them are still well-preserved.

This property has been preserved and is still standing today as a reflection of the well-built craftsmanship of Addison Mizner Industries and later Hermann V. von Holst and his team from Chicago IL. This 2-story house was designed in 1925 and built in 1926 by the Mizner Development Corporation. According to the design catalog for the Old Floresta houses, this is the only example of Model C non-reversed ever built.

Old Floresta became the first historic district of Boca Raton, Florida, in 1980. Today, it is one of the most beautiful and exclusive neighborhoods in the city. This narrow tree-lined streets neighborhood was conceived by Addison Mizner for two purposes: to invigorate the local real estate market and also provide housing to executives of the Mizner Development Corporation (developers of the Cloister Inn, which is nowadays the famed Boca Raton Resort.

The Fred C. Aiken house was added to the National Register of Historic Places in September 1992. There are two houses listed in the National Register in Boca Raton, both in Old Floresta. The other house is the Lavender House, two blocks south-west from the Fred C. Aiken House, where Hermann Von Holst lived until his death in 1953.

== Gallery ==
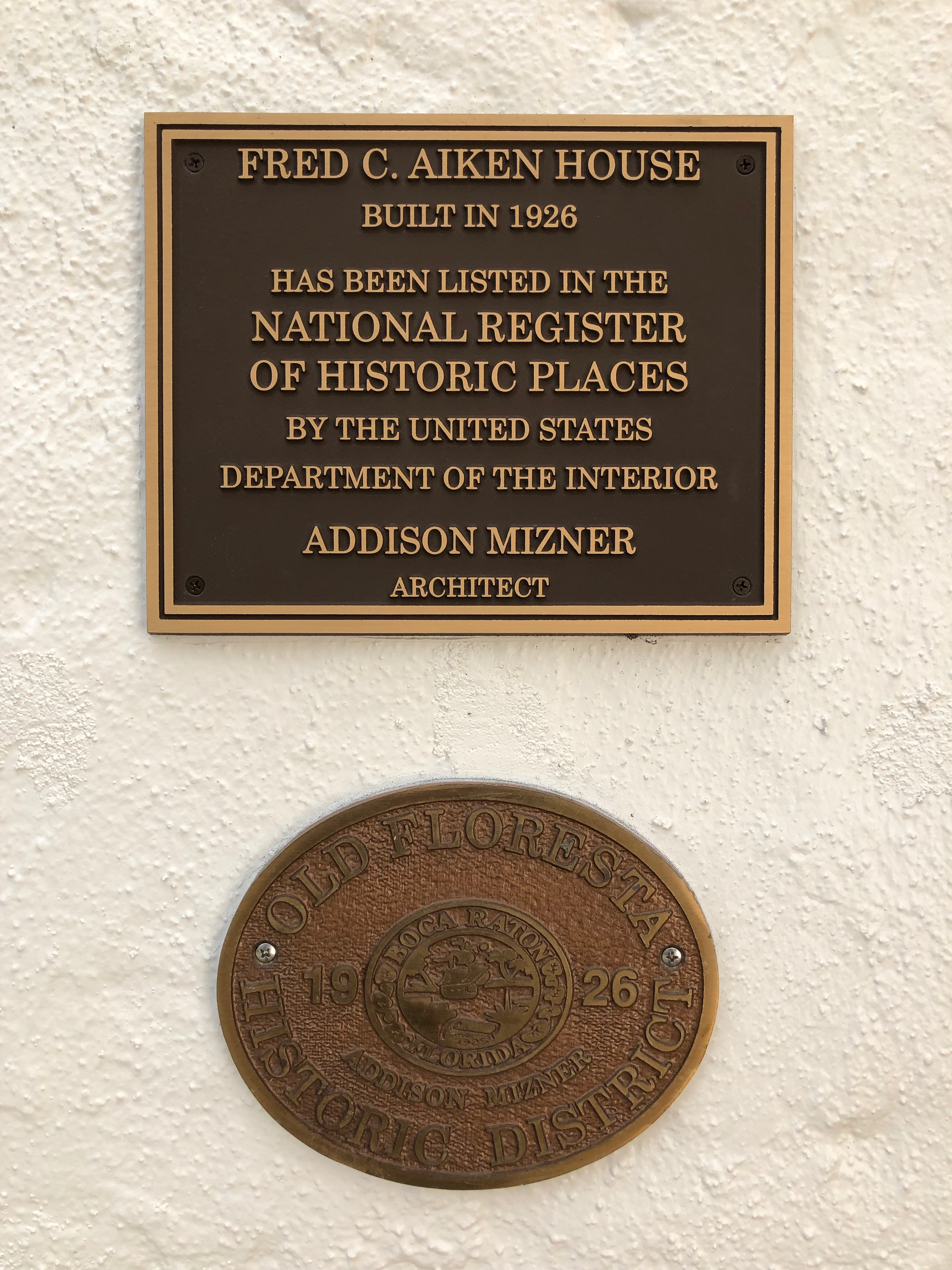
Fred C. Aiken house NRHS plaque

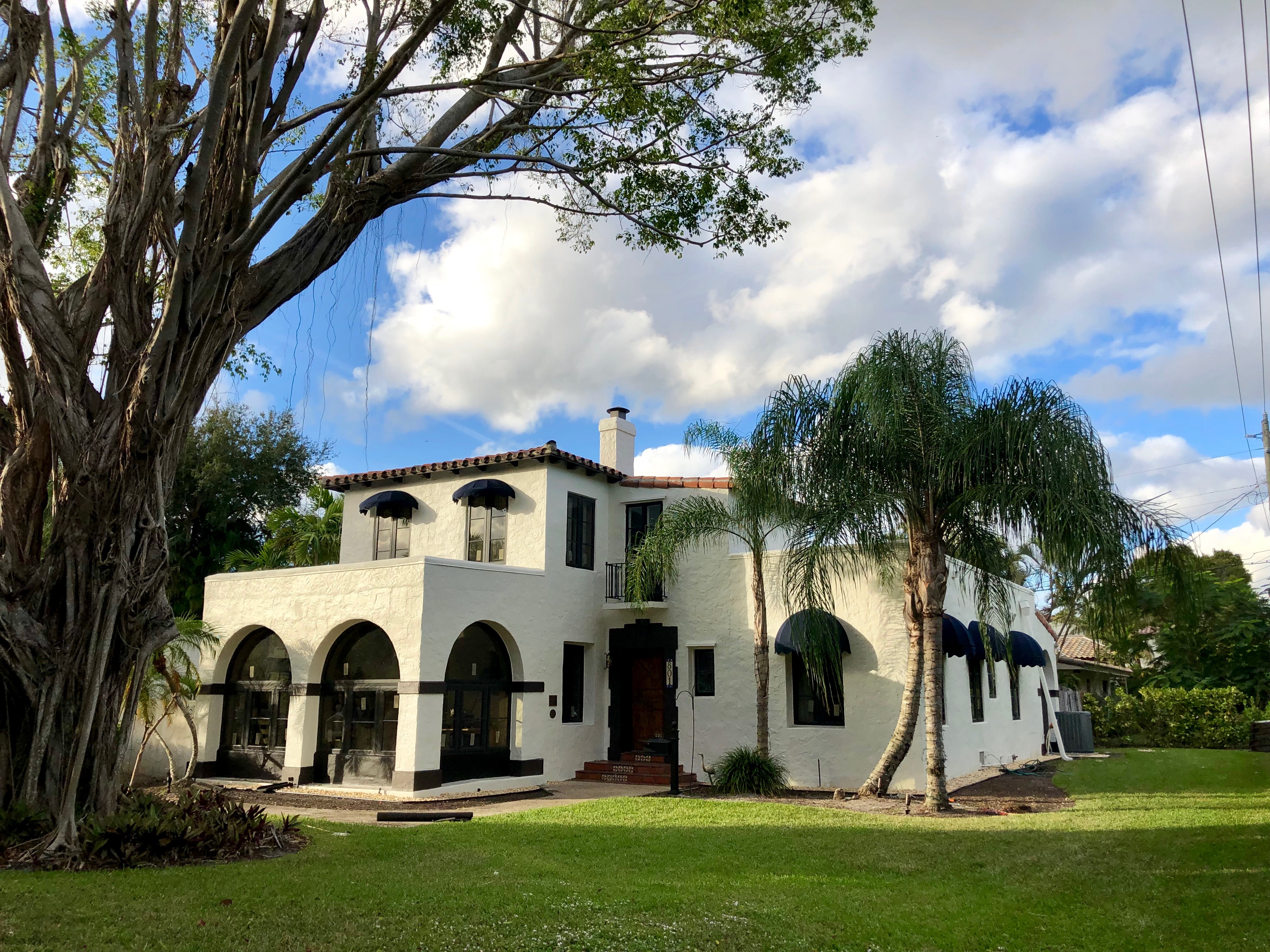
Fred C. Aiken House in Boca Raton FL

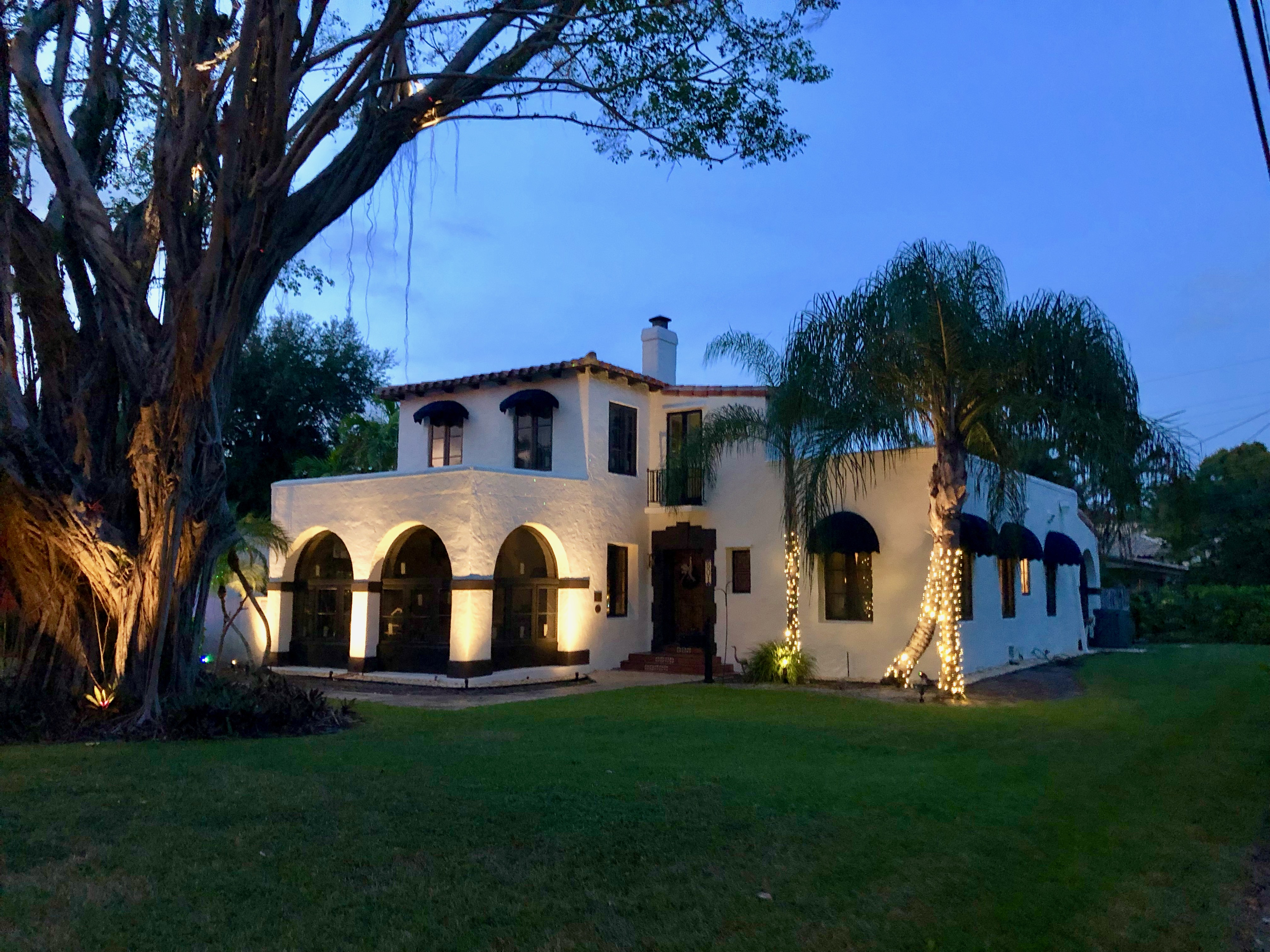
Fred C. Aiken House at night

== See also ==
- Administration Buildings (Boca Raton, Florida)
