= Story of Science =

Story of Science may refer to:

- The Story of Science: Power, Proof and Passion, 2010 BBC documentary
- The Story of Science in America, 1967 science book by L. Sprague de Camp and Catherine Crook de Camp
- The Story of Modern Science, 1923 book series by Henry Smith Williams

== See also ==
- List of popular misconceptions about science
- List of science fiction short stories
