= Henry Smith Williams =

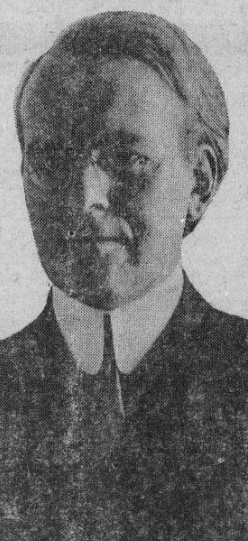
- Henry Smith Williams, MD, LL.B.
- Born: 4 March 1863; Durand, Illinois
- Died: 4 July 1942 (aged 79); Los Angeles, California
- Education: MD
- Alma mater: Chicago Medical College, 1884
- Occupations: Author, doctor, lawyer
- Spouse: Florence Whitney Williams (1889 -)
- Writing career
- Genres: Science, history, medicine

Henry Smith Williams (1863–1943) was a medical doctor, lawyer, and author of a number of books on medicine, history, and science.

== Work ==
In the introductory the Author of his book Drug Addicts Are Human Beings published in 1938, it is stated that this is the author's 119th published book. In addition to his work as a writer, it is claimed that Williams had treated some 10,000 patients in his medical practice. It also announces that he was an expert on the "chemistry and biology of the blood cells" and had spent ten years intensively studying cancer. His brother was the doctor Edward Huntington Williams, with whom he wrote his "History of Science (31 volumes)". He authored articles for Harper's Magazine.

In his book, Chasing the Scream, Johann Hari describes how the 1931 arrest and subsequent imprisonment of Williams' brother, Edward, was orchestrated by Harry J. Anslinger, head of the Federal Bureau of Narcotics, and that Williams, after pleading for his brother's release, spent much of the rest of his life advocating, as his brother had, for the kinder treatment of addicts (which eventually led to his writing of the book, Drug Addicts Are Human Beings), including prescribing addicts measured doses of the very drugs to which they were addicted, with surprising (anecdotal) success. In his 1938 book, Williams predicted with a high degree of accuracy that, fifty years later, drug-smuggling would grow to become a five-billion-dollar industry. Williams died still trying to end the drug war, his uncharacteristic book and his efforts at speaking out in favor of his brother's beliefs almost entirely suppressed and forgotten.

== Select works ==
- The Historians' History of the World (editor)
- The Story of Modern Science
- "A History of Science (10 volumes)". onlinebooks.library.upenn.edu.
- Luther Burbank: His Methods and Discoveries and Their Practical Application
- Modern Warfare
- Drugs against men, ISBN 0405136234
- The private lives of birds R.M. McBride & Co. (1939)
- Your glands and you R.M. McBride & Co. (1936)
- Alcohol : how it affects the individual, the community, and the race
- "Chronology (in part)" . Encyclopædia Britannica. Vol. 6 (11th ed.). 1911. pp. 305–306.
- "Civilization" . Encyclopædia Britannica. Vol. 6 (11th ed.). 1911. pp. 403–410.
- Manuscripts, inscriptions and muniments, oriental, classical, medieval and modern, described, classified and arranged, comprehending the history of the art of writing. Merrill & Baker (1902)
- Drugs Against Men. R.M. McBride & Co. (1935)
- Modern Warfare. Hearst's International Library Co. (1915)
- Witness of the Sun Doubleday, Page & Co. (1920)
- The Proteomorphic Theory and the New Medicine. Goodhue Co. (1918)
- "Wonder Book of the World's Progress", 10 Volume collection, copyright 1935, Funk & Wagnalls Co.
