= Mary Collins (psychologist) =

British psychologist

- Born: 1895
- Died: 1989 (aged 93–94)
- Education: Edinburgh University
- Occupation: Psychologist
- Known for: Expert in colour vision

Mary Collins (1895–1989) was an expert in colour vision, and psychology lecturer at Edinburgh University.

== Academic career ==
Mary Collins gained her MA in 1917 from Edinburgh University, her BEd in 1919 and PhD in 1923. She was then appointed lecturer in psychology at the University. Her first book, Colour Blindness was published in 1925 covering her initial work in studying aspects of color vision. Subsequently, she worked extensively with Sir James Drever, head of department, and subsequently with Boris Semeonoff (1910-1998). Collins became senior lecturer by 1950 and reader by 1956, retiring "before 1962".

=== Performance tests ===
Collins' time working with Drever was involved with developing test methods for determining the form of color blindness that patients may have, especially for those that would be most informative both in the teaching classroom and in the research lab. The insights she gained focused her testing on color development in children and how new education methods could be created to assist in those with disabilities, primarily those with deafness due to a shift in Drever's focus. Together, this resulted in the Drever-Collins Performance Tests for intelligence being produced in 1928. These were non-linguistic tests that enabled children to show their understanding of color, shapes, sizes, and weights without having to be told verbally what to do and only using printed instructions. The unique part of this testing system was that they were all created as a part of a wooden box containing different tests, with parts and objects filling the box. Such a testing tool could then be mass-produced, which was done by Edinburgh's own instrument manufacturer Andrew H. Baird.

The national testing protocols for skills and intelligence in Scotland, later established by the Scottish Council for Research in Education, relied heavily on the performance tests made by Collins and Drever.

== Select publications ==
- Colour-Blindness: With a Comparison of Different Methods of Testing Colour-Blindness (1923)

With Sir James Drever

- Experimental Psychology (1926)
- A First Laboratory Guide in Psychology (1926)
- Performance Tests of Intelligence (1928)
- Psychology and Practical Life (1936)

Obituary

- James Drever (1951) British Psychological Journal
