= Hermann Eduard von Holst =

German-American historian (1841–1904)

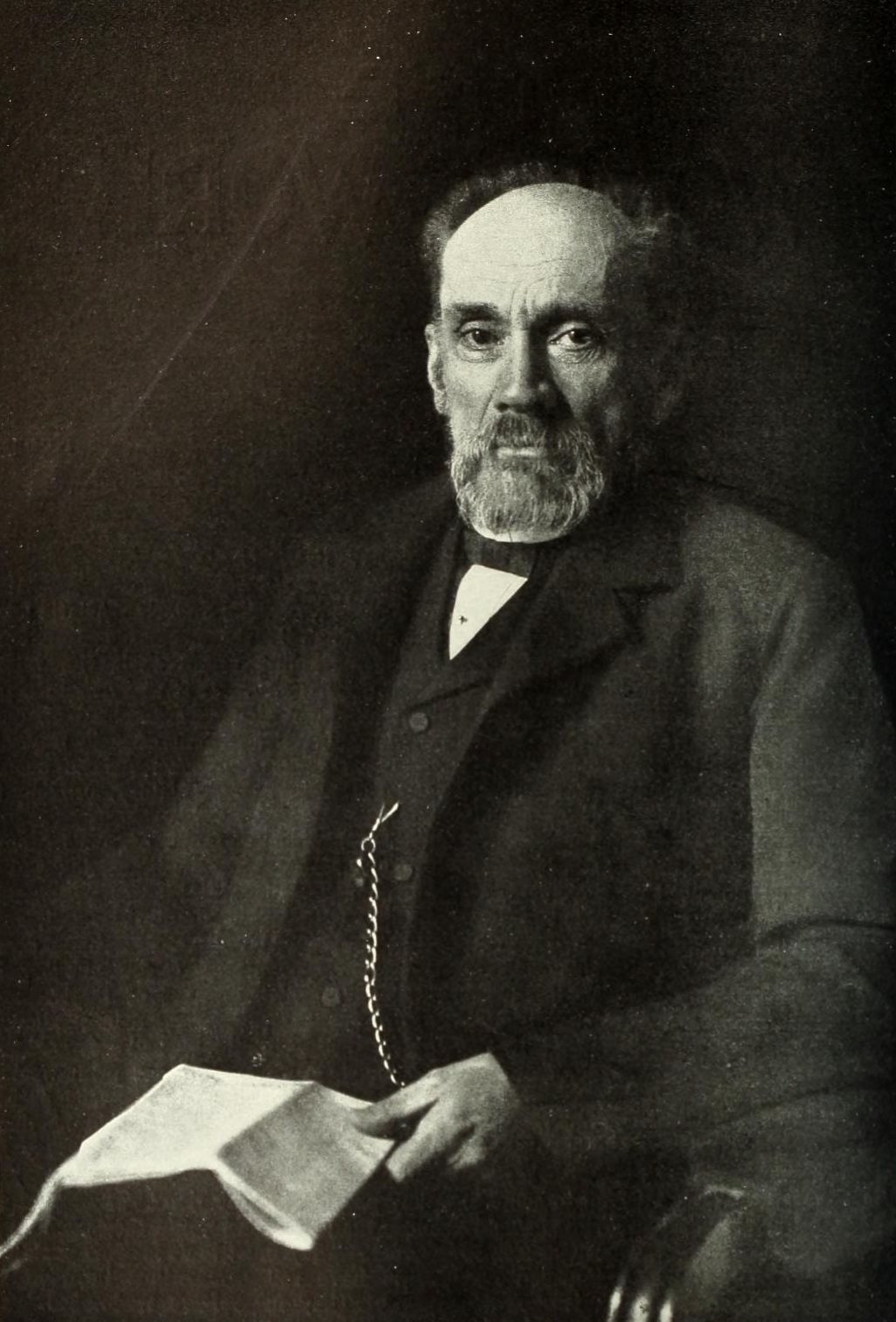
- Born: 19 June 1841; Fellin (now called Viljandi), Russian Empire (now in Estonia)
- Died: 20 January 1904 (aged 62); Freiburg im Breisgau, Germany
- Spouse: Annie Isabelle Hatt (m. 1872)

Academic background
- Education: Imperial University of Dorpat (BA); Heidelberg University (PhD)
- Thesis: (1865)
- Doctoral advisor: Ludwig Häusser

Academic work
- Institutions: University of Freiburg
- Doctoral students: Albert Bushnell Hart; James Harvey Robinson

Hermann Eduard von Holst (June 19, 1841 – January 20, 1904) was a German-American historian and author. Von Holst emigrated to the United States and wrote extensively on the Constitution of the United States, largely from an anti-slavery perspective.

== Biography ==
Holst was a Baltic German born in Fellin, Russian Empire (now Viljandi, Estonia). He was the seventh of ten children of a Lutheran minister. His father died while he was in the Gymnasium, and he had to teach and live frugally to stay in school.

He studied history at the Imperial University of Dorpat (now Tartu) and at Heidelberg University, where he received a doctorate under Ludwig Häusser in 1865. In 1866, he settled in St. Petersburg, but in consequence of a pamphlet on an attempt on the life of the Russian Emperor, which he published at Leipzig while he was traveling abroad, his return to Russia was forbidden.

He decided to emigrate to the United States in July 1867. He settled in New York City, where he taught modern languages for a time in a small private school and made a number of political speeches in the runup to the 1868 election. In the autumn of 1869, he became assistant editor, under Alexander Jacob Schem, of the Deutsch-Amerikanisches Conversations-Lexicon.

His work in German on Louis XIV, Federzeichnung aus der Geschichte des Despotismus, appeared in Leipzig soon after he arrived to the US. He subsequently became a contributor to several American journals.

On April 23, 1872, in Manhattan, he married Annie Isabelle Hatt, the daughter of the Rev. Josiah Hatt (1821–1857)—pastor of the Baptist Church in Hoboken, New Jersey—and his wife, Mary Thomas. Their son Hermann V. von Holst, the future architect, was born in Freiburg im Breisgau in 1874.

A call to a professorship of history in the newly reorganized University of Strasbourg brought him back to Germany in 1872. In 1874, he was given the chair of modern history at University of Freiburg in the Grand Duchy of Baden where he stayed until 1892. For ten years, he was a member of the Baden Herrenhaus, and he was vice president for four years. He revisited the United States in 1878 and 1879 and in 1884. In 1882 he was elected a member of the American Antiquarian Society In 1892, he became head of the department of history at the University of Chicago. Retiring on account of ill-health in 1900, he returned to Germany and died at Freiburg in January 1904.

Von Holst's works are almost all on American topics. Through his books and his lectures at the University of Chicago, he exerted a powerful influence in encouraging American students to follow more closely the German methods of historical research.

== Works ==
- Constitutional and Political History of the United States or Verfassung und Demokratie der Vereinigten Staaten'r (German ed., 5 vols., 1873–91; English trans. by Lalor and Mason, 8 vols., 1877–89) This is Von Holst's principal work. It covers the period from 1783 to 1861, though more than half of it is devoted to the decade 1850–60. It is written from a strongly anti-slavery point of view.
- Von Holst, Hermann (1876–1889). Lalor, John J. (ed.). The constitutional and political history of the United States. Vol. I. Chicago: Callahan & Company.
- —— (1876–1889). —— (ed.). The constitutional and political history of the United States. Vol. II. Chicago: Callahan & Company.
- —— (1876–1889). —— (ed.). The constitutional and political history of the United States. Vol. III. Chicago: Callahan & Company.
- —— (1876–1889). —— (ed.). The constitutional and political history of the United States. Vol. IV. Chicago: Callahan & Company.
- —— (1876–1889). —— (ed.). The constitutional and political history of the United States. Vol. V. Chicago: Callahan & Company.
- —— (1876–1889). —— (ed.). The constitutional and political history of the United States. Vol. VI. Chicago: Callahan & Company.
- —— (1876–1889). —— (ed.). The constitutional and political history of the United States. Vol. VII. Chicago: Callahan & Company.
- —— (1876–1889). —— (ed.). The constitutional and political history of the United States. Vol. VIII. Chicago: Callahan & Company.
- Das Staatrecht der Vereinigten Staaten or The Constitutional Law of the United States of America (German ed., 1885; English trans., 1887)
- John C. Calhoun (1882), in the American Statesmen Series
- John Brown (1888)
- The French Revolution Tested by Mirabeau's Career (1894) The topic of this book was the subject of a series of twelve lectures he gave for the Lowell Institute's 1893–94 season.
- —— (1876–1889). —— (ed.). The constitutional law of the United States of America. Vol. VIII. Chicago, Ill.: Callaghan.
