= Robert Prutz =

German poet and prose writer

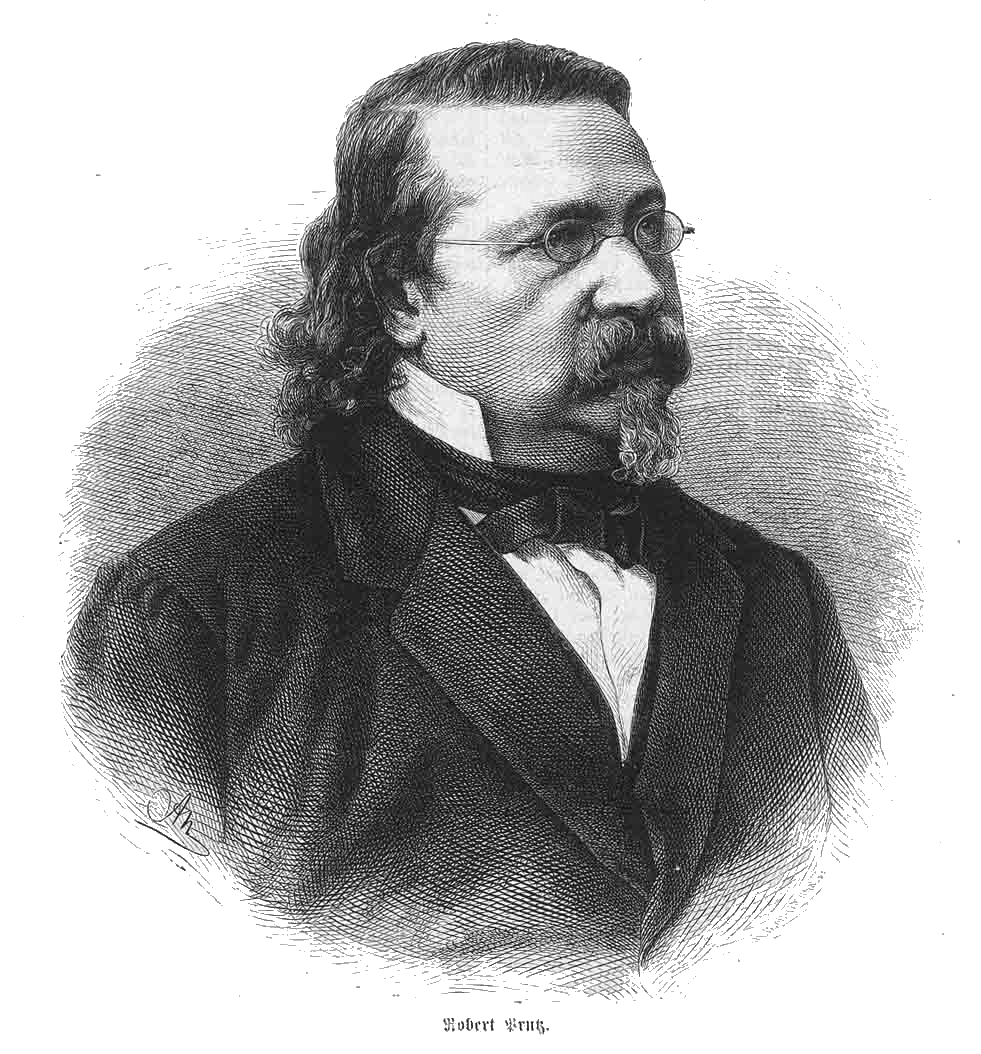
Robert Prutz.

Robert Eduard Prutz (30 May 1816 – 21 June 1872) was a German poet and prose writer.

He was born at Stettin, modern day Szczecin. He studied philology, philosophy and history at Berlin, Breslau, and Halle, and in the last-named became associated, after taking his degree, with Arnold Ruge in the publication of the Hallesche Jahrbücher. Subjected on account of his advanced political views to police surveillance, he removed to Jena, where, on the strength of an excellent monograph, Der Göttinger Dichterbund (1841), he hoped to obtain an academic appointment. He was, however, expelled from the town for offending against the press laws, and it was not until 1846 that he received permission to lecture in Berlin. From 1849 to 1859 he was extraordinary professor of literature at Halle, but retired in 1859 to Stettin, where he died in 1872.

Prutz belonged to the group of political poets who dominated German literature between 1841 and 1848; his poems are more conspicuous for their liberal tendency than their poetry. Among them may be mentioned Ein Märchen (1841); Gedichte (1841); Aus der Heimat (1858); Neue Gedichte (1860); Herbstrosen (i865); Buch der Liebe (1869). Among his novels are noteworthy, Das Engelchen (1851) and Der Musikantenturm (1855). Much more important are his contributions to literary history and criticism: Vorlesungen über die Geschichte des deutschen Theaters (1847); Ludwig Holberg (1857); Die deutsche Literatur der Gegenwart (1859), and Menschen und Bücher (1862). Prutz also wrote some dramas of little merit.

His son Hans Prutz was a notable historian.
