= Lavender House =

Historic house in Florida, United States

- U.S. National Register of Historic Places
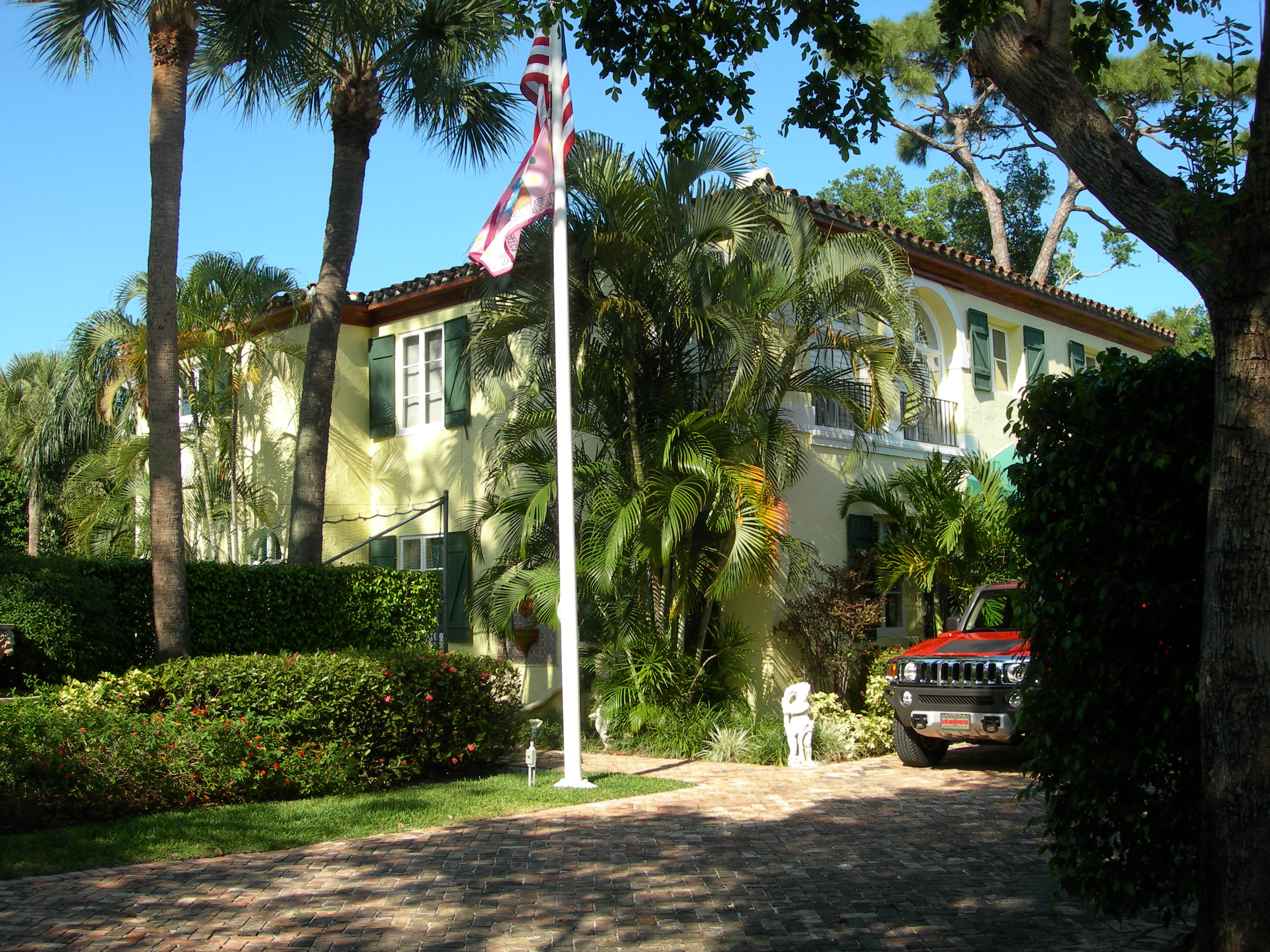

- Location within Florida Location within the United States
- Location: Boca Raton, Palm Beach County, Florida
- Coordinates: 26°21′05.01″N 80°06′13.95″W
- Architectural style: Mission/Spanish Revival
- NRHP reference No.: 95000165
- Added to NRHP: February 24, 1995

The Lavender House (also known as the Hermann V. von Holst House) is a historic home in Boca Raton, Florida, United States. It is located at 875 Alamanda Street. On February 24, 1995, it was added to the U.S. National Register of Historic Places.

Modern real estate agents in Boca Raton tend to mistakenly describe von Holst's residential work there as by the colorful, quixotic Addison Mizner. While Mizner did serve as the general contractor and developer of "Floresta" in its initial stage, the architectural plans for these homes were by von Holst, who was a distinguished Chicago Prairie School architect who relocated to Florida for this purpose. Soon after the neighborhood was begun, Mizner defaulted on payments to contractors and was successfully sued by von Holst, et al., and thereafter von Holst took chief responsibility for nurturing Floresta to success.

Lucy von Holst, along with the wives of their two remaining partners (John Verhoeven and Fred Aiken), prepared unsold homes for stylish winter rentals for snowbirds. The true story of old Floresta has been carefully documented by Dr. Donald W. Curl in the journal of the Boca Raton Historical Society. There are two houses listed in the National Register in Boca Raton. The other house is the Fred C. Aiken House, two blocks away from the Lavender House, where Boca Raton's third Mayor, Fred C. Aiken lived for 31 years.
