= James Drever (psychologist, born 1873) =

Scottish psychologist and academic (1873–1950)

Sir James Drever FRSE
- Born: 8 April 1873; Shapinsay, Orkney, Scotland
- Died: 10 August 1950 (aged 77)
- Occupation: Psychologist
- Known for: First professor of Psychology at a Scottish university

Sir James Drever FRSE (8 April 1873 – 10 August 1950) was a Scottish psychologist and academic who was the first professor of Psychology at a Scottish university.

== Early life ==
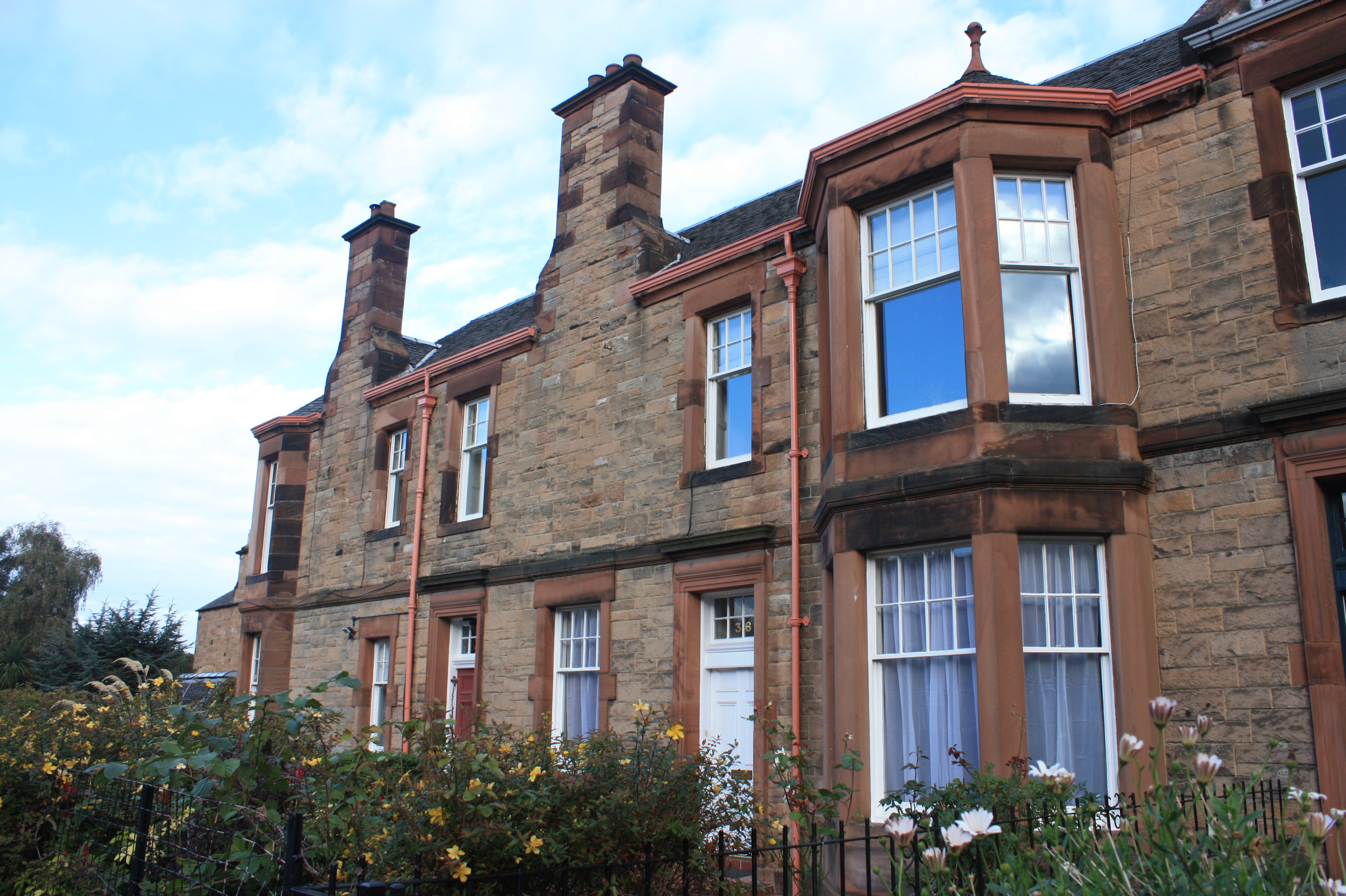
36 Lomond Road, Edinburgh, Drever's home in 1889

Sir James Drever was born on 8 April 1873 in Balfour, on Shapinsay Island, Orkney. After an argument between Drever's father and their landlord, the Drever family were evicted from their home. They subsequently migrated to Stromness. Drever was a rather delicate and sickly child who quickly grew fond of reading. He was gifted with the ability to learn and memorize things rapidly as well as retain the information. He could repeat several pages of his favorite author's works. At age fourteen Drever was indentured for four years as a pupil-teacher. He assisted the headmaster of the school for two years before breaking his indenture. Drever was willing to pay the penalty because he felt that he was wasting his time in regard to his own education. At this time he was living at 36 Lomond Road in Trinity, Edinburgh.

== Education ==
In 1889 Drever began his studies at the University of Edinburgh. He graduated in four years with a Master of Arts degree. This was a seven-subject curriculum in Latin, Greek, mathematics, natural philosophy, logic and psychology, moral philosophy, rhetoric and English literature. Drever went on to study medicine for two years but exhaustion and financial difficulty halted his education. After considering his options of joining the Church or becoming a teacher he decided on teaching. The next eleven years of his life would be spent teaching a variety of subjects at different schools. After switching between schools, Drever spent three years as headmaster of the Central School on the island of Stronsay in Orkney.

== Research and career in education ==
Between 1907 and 1913 Drever was the assistant to the professor of education in Edinburgh and conducted research on the German methods of training both primary and secondary teachers. During these years he also assisted in urging his chief, Professor Darroch, to institute a postgraduate degree in education. After some hesitation on the part of Darroch, it was successfully put in place in 1914. The addition of this diploma was a very important development for the teaching of psychology in Scottish universities. It gave education a concrete place as a required subject in a diploma course. Its addition also attracted many potential students.

James Drever lectured on the theory, history, and psychology of education. His students were in training to become teachers under the Edinburgh Provincial Committee for the Training of Teachers. Around this same time Drever spent a few months in 1908 and 1909 visiting secondary schools in Germany. What he studied was the German methods of training both primary and secondary teachers. The main reason for these visits to Germany was that they wanted to institute a new course in present-day educational systems and problems at the University of Edinburgh. Drever had been put in charge of developing this course. Another result of this research was the publication of several papers on German education in school.

In the summer of 1913 Drever paid one more visit to Germany, and spent a few weeks in Meumann's laboratory in Hamburg. The object of his third visit was to study the equipment of the laboratory from the point of view of experimental pedagogy. He found that it was possible to develop a course in experimental pedagogy, for advanced students, at the Edinburgh Training Center.

== Work as psychologist ==
1912 was the year Drever was put in charge of the laboratory he helped create. This was the first pedagogical laboratory in the United Kingdom. The labs primary function was to introduce the more advanced students to the application of experimental methods to educational problems. It was also intended to provide the means for original experimentation. Work was done on fatigue in schools, children's vocabulary, and the analytical study of reading and writing. A number of papers on the work done in the lab were published in journals over the next six years.

From 1919 onward there was a great expansion in the Department of Psychology at the University of Edinburgh. Psychology had previously been only a subsection of other subjects. However, in 1924 the university began transforming the Department of Psychology into its own section. In 1931 he was elevated to the position of Professor of Psychology, and was the first person to hold such a post in Scotland. The department Drever took over expanded greatly during Drever's time in charge of it. In this role, he has been described as 'instrumental' in the establishment of the psychology degree program at Edinburgh.

Among his colleagues at Edinburgh were Dr Mary Collins, the psychoanalyst Dr W.R.D. Fairbairn and J. D. Sutherland. Collins collaborated with Drever on a number of books. Drever retired in 1944 and was succeeded by his son, also called James Drever.

== Recognition ==
Drever is recognised as an expert in experimental psychology thanks to his pioneering contributions to that field. He served as president of British Psychological Society in 1926, and in 1948 he was appointed president of the Twelfth International Congress of Psychology. He was heavily involved in organising this congress, which met in Edinburgh, but was unable to attend his presidential ceremony due to illness. His son delivered the presidential address in his stead.

In recognition of his work Drever was knighted in 1938. His interest in the influence of Scandinavian language on the Orcadian dialect led to his being made a Knight of the First Class of the Royal Norwegian Order of Saint Olav.

== Family ==
Drever was married to Annie May Watson in 1907. Their sons were James Drever, who succeeded his father's role at the University of Edinburgh, and Harald Irving Drever FRSE (1912-1975), a geologist. The younger James Drever was also a noted psychologist, BPS president, and was the first principal and vice-chancellor of the University of Dundee. Drever died on 10 August 1950.
