= Ammirato =

Ammirato is an Italian surname. Notable people with the surname include:

- Domenico Ammirato (1833–1883), Italian painter;
- Scipione Ammirato (1531–1601), Italian historian;
- Tommaso Ammirato (died 1438), Italian Roman Catholic bishop.

== See also ==
- Mary Ammirato-Collins, American artist and poet.
