= Hermann V. von Holst =

German-born American architect

- Born: June 17, 1874
- Died: 1955 (aged 80–81)
- Occupation: Architect

Hermann Valentin von Holst (1874–1955) was an American architect practicing in Chicago, Illinois, and Boca Raton, Florida, from the 1890s to the 1940s. He is best remembered for agreeing to take on the responsibility of heading up Frank Lloyd Wright's architectural practice when Wright went off to Europe with Mamah Cheney in 1909.

Von Holst was born in Freiburg, Germany, on June 17, 1874, the son of the eminent historian Hermann Eduard von Holst and a Hoboken, New Jersey, native, Annie Isabelle Hatt, who had married on April 23, 1872, in New York City. The von Holsts lived in Germany with visits to the United States until they emigrated from Germany to Chicago in 1891, where von Holst, Sr., became head of the department of history at the University of Chicago.

== In Chicago ==
Von Holst graduated from the architecture program at the University of Chicago in 1893 and the architecture program at MIT in 1896. He found employment as a draughtsman at the prestigious architectural firm of Shepley, Rutan and Coolidge, in their Chicago office, one of the successor firms of the celebrated architect Henry Hobson Richardson. By 1900, von Holst was head draughtsman at the firm. Following extensive travels, von Holst opened his own practice in Chicago in 1905, with offices in The Rookery Building, Chicago. In 1909, he moved his office to Chicago's Steinway Hall, where he was among a collegial group of Prairie School architects.

Active in professional organizations, von Holst served as treasurer of the Architectural League of America in 1905. He published several books on architectural subjects, including Cyclopedia of Drawing (1907) and Modern American Homes (1913) which featured work of fellow architects, including Walter Burley Griffin, Frank Lloyd Wright, and Lawrence Buck. He served as professor of architectural design at the Chicago School of Architecture at the Art Institute of Chicago. He also taught design in the Department of Architecture at the Armour Institute of Technology (later IIT).

In the period 1904–1906, von Holst created summer countryside estate architecture in the White Mountains of New Hampshire for socially prominent and wealthy clients, including Pittsburgh glassmaking millionaire George A. Macbeth and International Harvester partner John Glessner, whose Chicago Glessner House was designed by Henry Hobson Richardson.

== Overseeing Frank Lloyd Wright's practice ==
Before Frank Lloyd Wright and Mrs. Cheney went off together to Europe, Wright asked various architects to take on the responsibility of his office, including Marion Mahony and George Grant Elmslie, both of whom refused. Finally, he arranged for von Holst to oversee the work. Along with continuing Wright studio architects Isabel Roberts and John Van Bergen, von Holst contracted with Marion Mahony (who stipulated that she would have complete control of architectural design) and her husband Walter Burley Griffin (for landscape architecture). Together, they brought what work they could of Wright's to completion, much of it modified to Marion Mahony Griffin's designs.

The result of this collaboration is a collection of Prairie Style residences in a Griffin-planned landscape on Millikin Place in Decatur, Illinois and a pair of homes, one by Wright and the other by von Holst and Mahony, on the same street in Grand Rapids, Michigan. Clara and Henry Ford also commissioned a design that was not realized, building instead a home, Fair Lane, designed by others.

Architectural historians have tended to underestimate von Holst's abilities and influence in the world of architecture. However, it is clear that a man with degrees from two outstanding architecture departments, who had served as head draughtsman for the leading firm of Shepley, Rutan & Coolidge, who taught design and served as treasurer of the Architectural League of America was a solid choice for this task. Also, architectural critics have tended either to undervalue or misattribute work done while Wright was mostly incommunicado in Europe. The output of Wright's office in the years 1909–11 should be assessed on its own merit as work designed by the team headed by Marion Mahony under the auspices of von Holst.

Modern architectural critics have wondered why Wright selected an architect not known for the Prairie Style to supervise his office. However, even a cursory glace at his work both during and after supervising Wright's office shows an impressive collection of buildings contributing to the Prairie School's output in Chicago and the Midwest (see partial listing of work below, especially the non-Wright work of 1910–11).

While von Holst was supervising Wright's office, he and Lucy Edith Hammond were married. For a time he shared a partnership with James L. Fyfe. Von Holst continued to practice in Chicago through the 1920s, and served as president of the Chicago Architectural League. He collaborated with George Grant Elmslie on a number of Prairie Style commercial and industrial structures, particularly a series of train stations and power company buildings. On June 10, 1928, Condell Memorial Hospital, which von Host designed, was dedicated in Libertyville, Illinois.

== In Florida ==
Von Holst was lured to Florida by the possibilities for work there during the land boom as well as the relief from Chicago winters. Practicing in Boca Raton, he was engaged in architecture and land development from the late 1920s onward.

In Boca Raton, von Holst headed a group that completed a subdivision of 29 Florida Spanish Revival homes named Floresta, which means a delightful rural place. In addition to designing many of the homes, including his own (Lavender House, c. 1928), von Holst named the suburb and named its streets for native Florida birds and plants, denoting an appreciation von Holst shared with noted Florida artists Sam Stoltz and Joy Postle (who drew von Holst's portrait). It was von Holst who brought the subdivision to completion following the Florida land bust.

Modern real estate agents in Boca Raton tend to mistakenly describe von Holst's residential work there as by the colorful, quixotic Addison Mizner. While Mizner did serve as the general contractor / developer of "Floresta" the architectural plans for these homes were von Holst's. Moreover, Mizner defaulted on payments to contractors, was successfully sued by von Holst, et al., and thereafter von Holst took chief responsibility for its success. Lucy von Holst, along with the wives of their two remaining partners (John Verhoeven and Fred Aiken), prepared unsold homes for stylish winter rentals for snowbirds. The true story of old Floresta has been documented by Dr. Donald W. Curl in the journal of the Boca Raton Historical Society.

Von Holst retired from architecture in 1932. He was chairman of the Boca Raton Town Planning Board in 1940. Von Holst served on the Boca Raton Council from 1934 to 1947 and again in 1948–1949 and was granted honorary life membership on the board in 1953.

== Publications ==
In conjunction with his architectural practice and teaching, von Holst published works on architecture, including:

- A Study of the Orders – 1906
- Cyclopedia of Drawing: A General Reference Work on Drawing – 1907
- Modern American Homes – 1913

== Architectural work – partial listing ==
- The Glamis, summer country estate of Mr. and Mrs. George A. Macbeth, Bethlehem, New Hampshire – 1904–05
- Agricultural buildings at The Rocks, the John Glessner Summer Estate, Bethlehem, New Hampshire – 1905
- David Amberg Residence, Grand Rapids, Michigan (office of Frank Lloyd Wright; Hermann V. von Holst, architect, Marion Mahony, associate architect) – 1909
- E. P Irving Residence, Millikin Place, Decatur, Illinois, (office of Frank Lloyd Wright; Hermann V. von Holst, architect, Marion Mahony, associate architect) – 1909
- Robert Mueller, Millikin Place, Decatur, Illinois, (office of Frank Lloyd Wright; Hermann V. von Holst, architect, Marion Mahony, associate architect) – 1909-11
- Adolph Mueller Residence, Millikin Place, Decatur, Illinois, (office of Frank Lloyd Wright; Hermann V. von Holst, architect, Marion Mahony, associate architect) – 1909
- Clubhouse for Howe School, Howe, Indiana – 1910-12
- Residence, with gable roof, side entry porch and urn bearing plinths, location unknown, c. 1911
- Maurice LeBosquet Residence, Tracy, Illinois - c. 1911
- A. J. Mason Residence, Flossmore, Illinois – c. 1911
- C. H. Wills Residence, Detroit, Michigan, (project) (office of Frank Lloyd Wright, with Marion Mahony) – 1912
- "Fair Lane" residence for Henry Ford, Detroit (office of Frank Lloyd Wright, unbuilt original design, with Marion Mahony Griffin) – 1912
- Commonwealth Edison Electric Power Substation, 4401 N. Clifton Ave., Chicago, Illinois – 1916
- Howe School Chapel, Howe, Indiana – 1917 (von Holst and Fyfe)
- People's Light & Gas Company, Milwaukee Avenue, Chicago, Illinois, c. 1923/1924 (Hermann V. von Holst, architect; George Grant Elmslie, associate architect)
- Lake Lawn Hotel, 2400 E. Geneva St., Delavan, Wisconsin, c. 1923/1924 (Hermann V. von Holst, architect; George Grant Elmslie associate architect)
- People's Light & Gas Company, Larrabee Street, Chicago, Illinois, c. 1924/1925 (Hermann V. von Holst, architect; George Grant Elmslie associate architect)
- People's Light & Gas Company, 114 N. Oak Park Avenue, Oak Park, Illinois c. 1926 (Hermann V. von Holst, architect; George Grant Elmslie associate architect)
- Condell Memorial Hospital, 303 East Cleveland, Libertyville, Illinois, c. 1927/1928 (Hermann V. von Holst, architect). Spanish revival hospital with a floor plan in the shape of a cross. Demolished 2004.
- People's Light & Gas Company, Irving Park Store, Illinois, c. 1927/1928 (Hermann V. von Holst, architect; George Grant Elmslie associate architect)
- Humboldt Park Distributing Station, Humboldt Park, Illinois, (no date) (Hermann V. von Holst, architect; George Grant Elmslie, delineator)
- Lavender House, Hermann V. von Holst residence, "Old Floresta", 875 Allamanda St., Boca Raton, Florida – 1927
- Oleander House, Rev. Henry Mizner residence, "Old Floresta", 888 Oleander St., Boca Raton, Florida – 1927
- Ilex House, 775 Azalea St., "Old Floresta", Boca Raton, Florida – 1927
- Elgin Station, Elgin, Illinois, 1928 (Hermann V. von Holst, architect; George Grant Elmslie associate architect)
- Aurora Terminal, Aurora, Illinois, 1928 (Hermann V. von Holst, architect; George Grant Elmslie, associate architect)
- Wisconsin Power and Light Company Building, Lake Geneva, Wisconsin, 1929-30
- Maxwelton Braes Hotel (Rosslyn Hall), Baileys Harbor, Wisconsin, 1930 (Hermann V. von Holst, associated architect; George Grant Elmslie, associate architect)
- Ocean Beach Pavilion II, Boca Raton – 1930
