= The Story of Modern Science =

Book series by Henry Smith Williams

The Story of Modern Science

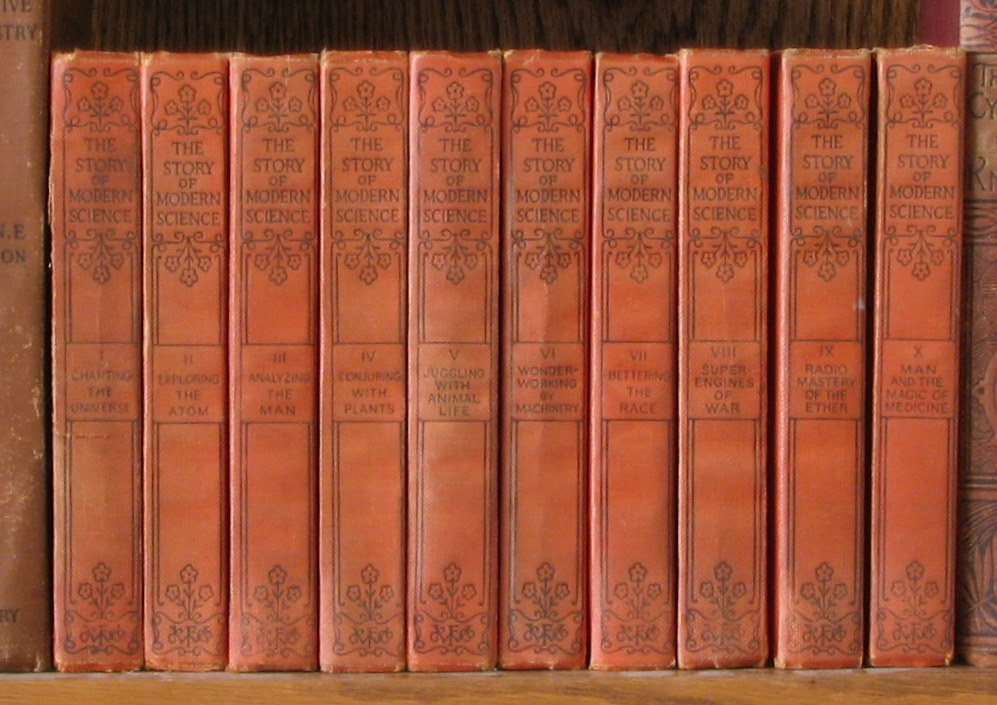
The complete set

The Story of Modern Science is a ten-volume book series by Henry Smith Williams, published by Funk and Wagnalls Co. The books, published in 1923, explained in detail the current technology and scientific methods of the Modern Era.

The 10 volumes include:

I. Charting the Universe
II. Exploring the Atom
III. Analyzing the Man
IV. Conjuring with Plants
V. Juggling with Animal Life
VI. Wonder-Working by Machinery
VII. Bettering the Race of Man
VIII. Super-Engines of War
IX. Radio-Mastery of the Ether
X. Man and the Magic of Medicine
