= James Drever =

Scottish academic (1910–1991)

- Born: 29 January 1910; Edinburgh
- Died: 5 November 1991 (aged 81); Dundee, Scotland
- Occupations: Philosopher, psychologist, Principal
- Known for: First Principal of the University of Dundee

James Drever FRSE (29 January 1910 – 5 November 1991) was a Scottish academic who served as the first Principal of the University of Dundee. He has been described as 'one of the most pivotal figures in the university's history'.

== Early life and career ==
James Drever was born to Orcadian parents in Edinburgh in 1910. His father was the academic James Drever (1873–1950), who had studied at the University of Edinburgh from 1889, from which he graduated with an MA before proceeding to study medicine. The elder Drever then worked at the university as assistant to the Professor of Education, before his appointment as Combe Lecturer and head of the Psychology Department at Edinburgh in 1918. James Drever was educated at the Royal High School of Edinburgh, the University of Edinburgh and St John's College, Cambridge, where he studied the moral sciences tripos and graduated in 1934. Drever would remain in academia for the rest of his working life, aside from a period of service in the Royal Navy. From 1934 he taught philosophy at Edinburgh, joining Newcastle University as a lecturer four years later. By this time he had an interest in Psychology and taught both subjects at Newcastle. In the Second World War he served in the Royal Navy.

In 1931 his father had been promoted at Edinburgh to become the first Professor of Psychology in Scotland. In 1944 the elder Drever retired, and it was his son who was chosen as his successor, but could not take the post until the end of the war. In addition to his responsibilities as a professor and head of department, the younger Drever also served as Dean of the Faculty of Arts at Edinburgh from 1958 until 1960 and was a visiting professor at Princeton University from 1954 until 1955.

Along with his father, and others, he was heavily involved in organising the 12th International Congress of Psychology, which met in Edinburgh in 1948. His father was elected president of the congress, but was unable to attend it due to ill health. Consequently, it was the younger Drever who delivered the presidential address his father had written on the theme of "Scottish psychology since Hume".

Under James Drever's leadership from 1944 to 1966 the Psychology Department at Edinburgh increased in both size and stature and an "Honours School" in Psychology was fully established. In 1963 the department left the premises it had been in since it was set up in 1906 and moved to new accommodation at 60, The Pleasance. As had been the case under his father's stewardship, the department's teaching included 'a strong philosophical element'. During this period Drever established himself as a well known and highly respected Psychologist and served as president of the British Psychological Society.

== Robbins Committee and the University of Dundee ==
Drever had a strong interest in theories and practice of higher education and this led to his appointment to the Committee on Higher Education chaired by Lionel Robbins. Drever and Sir David Anderson, the former director of the Royal College of Science and Technology were the only Scottish members of the committee. Drever would later recall his work with the Committee included visiting the USSR where the committee was impressed with the detailed level of planning relating to education that was carried out. The resulting Robbins Report recommended the immediate expansion of university education in the United Kingdom. One result of this was the decision that Queen's College, Dundee, a part of the University of St. Andrews should become a university in its own right. Drever was an obvious candidate to lead this new institution and in 1966 was appointed as Master of Queen's College to oversee its transition in the University of Dundee. When the university was granted its charter the following year Drever formally became its principal and vice-chancellor. Drever's appointment marked the first time a psychologist had obtained such a post in the United Kingdom.

== Principal of the University of Dundee ==
It has been argued that in his role as principal, Drever "did much to establish the University of Dundee as a success". The early years of the university's existence were difficult ones. Changes in government policy on higher education meant that the university was operating in an uncertain financial environment and cuts had to be made. At the same time there were episodes of student discontent and protest. These included a student 24 work-in led by George Robertson in 1968, student occupations of the University Tower Building in 1971 and 1974, a student rent strike in 1973 (which Drever initially seemed to not only support, but to encourage) and various smaller protests. Drever gave support to some of these protests and in 1969 actually encouraged students to oppose a planned visit to the university by Enoch Powell. Drever's stance on Powell attracted media attention, with the Glasgow Herald comparing his actions to that of a 'gamekeeper-turned-poacher'. While the aftermath of the 1973 rent strike, which saw the suspension of the Dundee University Students' Association's constitution by the University Court and threats to sue some of the strikers, caused some students to express a degree of ill-feeling towards Drever, others thought highly of him.

Drever took an active role in establishing the University of Dundee Botanic Garden, which opened in October 1971.

Drever oversaw the university developing increasing links with Duncan of Jordanstone College of Art, with the art students receiving lectures at the university and the creation of a joint degree in Town Planning.

While Principal of Dundee he served as Honorary President of the Abertay Historical Society.

Drever retired as Principal in 1978 after 11 years in office, a period of service unmatched by any of his successors. His papers are now held by the university's Archive Services and the university's fine art collections include a portrait of Drever in his principal's robes painted by Alberto Morocco. The university holds, as an occasional event, a Drever Lecture in Psychology to commemorate him.

Academic offices
Preceded by Arthur Alexander Matheson	Master of Queen's College, Dundee; 1966–1967	Succeeded by Himself as Principal of University of Dundee
Preceded by New Position	Principal and Vice-Chancellor of the University of Dundee; 1967–1978	Succeeded by Adam Neville
