= Samuel Astley Dunham =

British historian (1796–1858)

- Born: 1796
- Died: 17 July 1858; St Pancras, London
- Occupation: Writer

Samuel Astley Dunham (1796 – 17 July 1858) was a British historian and author of works published in Lardner's Cabinet Cyclopædia. All were distinguished by original research and conscientious thoroughness.

== Life ==
After this time he was largely occupied with the reviewing of books and, in his latest years, with biblical work, much of which has never seen the light. He is said to have had a long and intimate acquaintance with Spain, presumably prior to the writing of his history. He was intimate with Southey, who spoke of his knowledge of the Middle Ages as marvellous, and he was in close correspondence with Lingard, the historian, who was godfather to one of his sons. His death took place suddenly by paralysis on 17 July 1858. One of his sons was a missionary priest, working in the Australian bush in 1888.

== Works ==
He wrote:

1. The History of Poland, 1831.
2. History of Spain and Portugal, 5 vols., 1832–3. This was long accounted the best work on the subject in any language. It obtained for him the distinction of being made a member of the Royal Spanish Academy; and it was translated into Spanish by Alcala Galiano in 1844.
3. A History of Europe during the Middle Ages, 4 vols., 1833–4.
4. Lives of the Most Eminent Literary and Scientific Men of Great Britain, 3 vols., 1836–7. These volumes include dramatists and early writers, and were not wholly written by Dunham.
5. History of Denmark, Sweden, and Norway, 3 vols., 1839–40.
6. History of the Germanic Empire, 3 vols., 1844–5.
