= Eduard Meyer =

German historian (1855–1930)

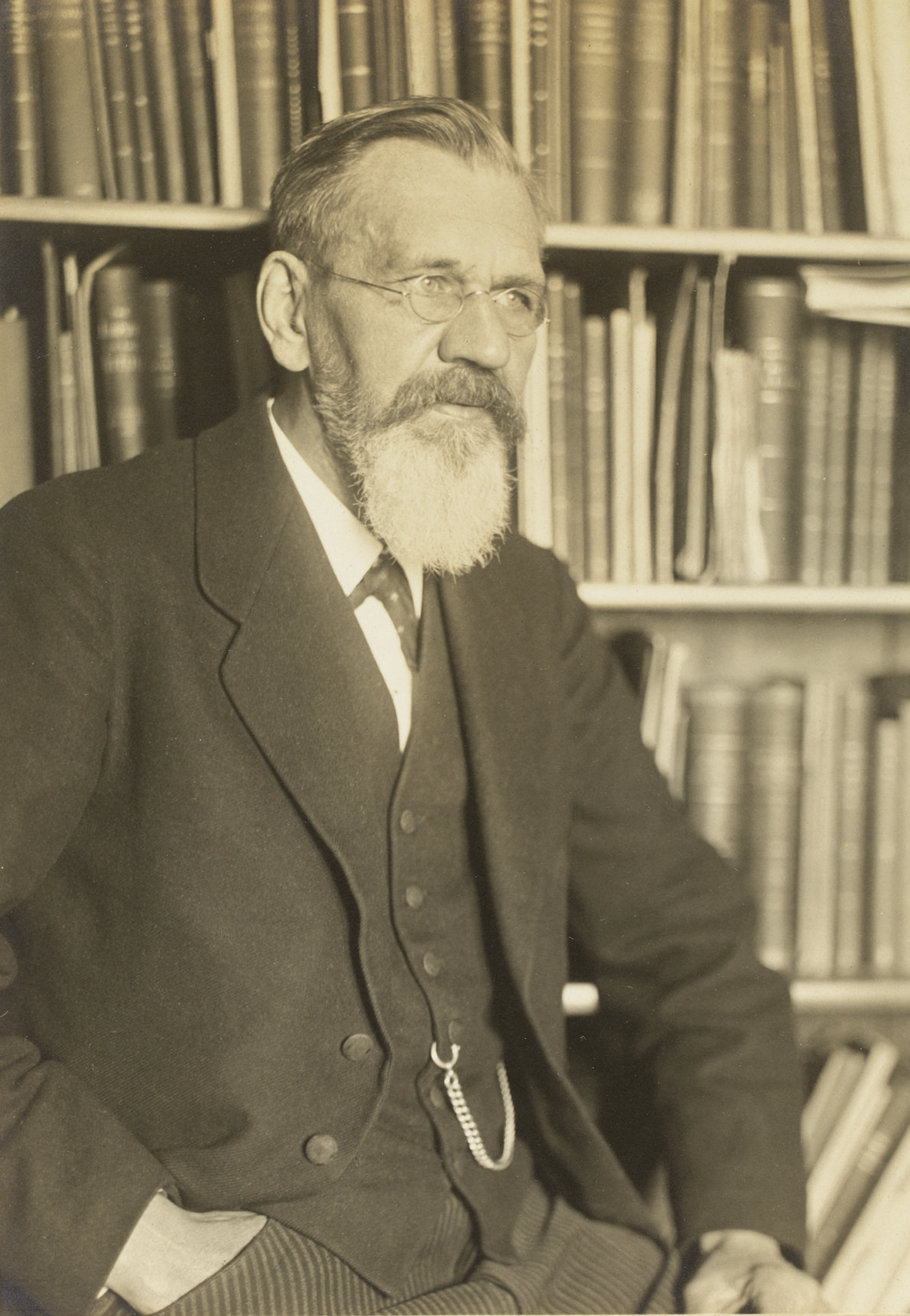
Eduard Meyer (1925)

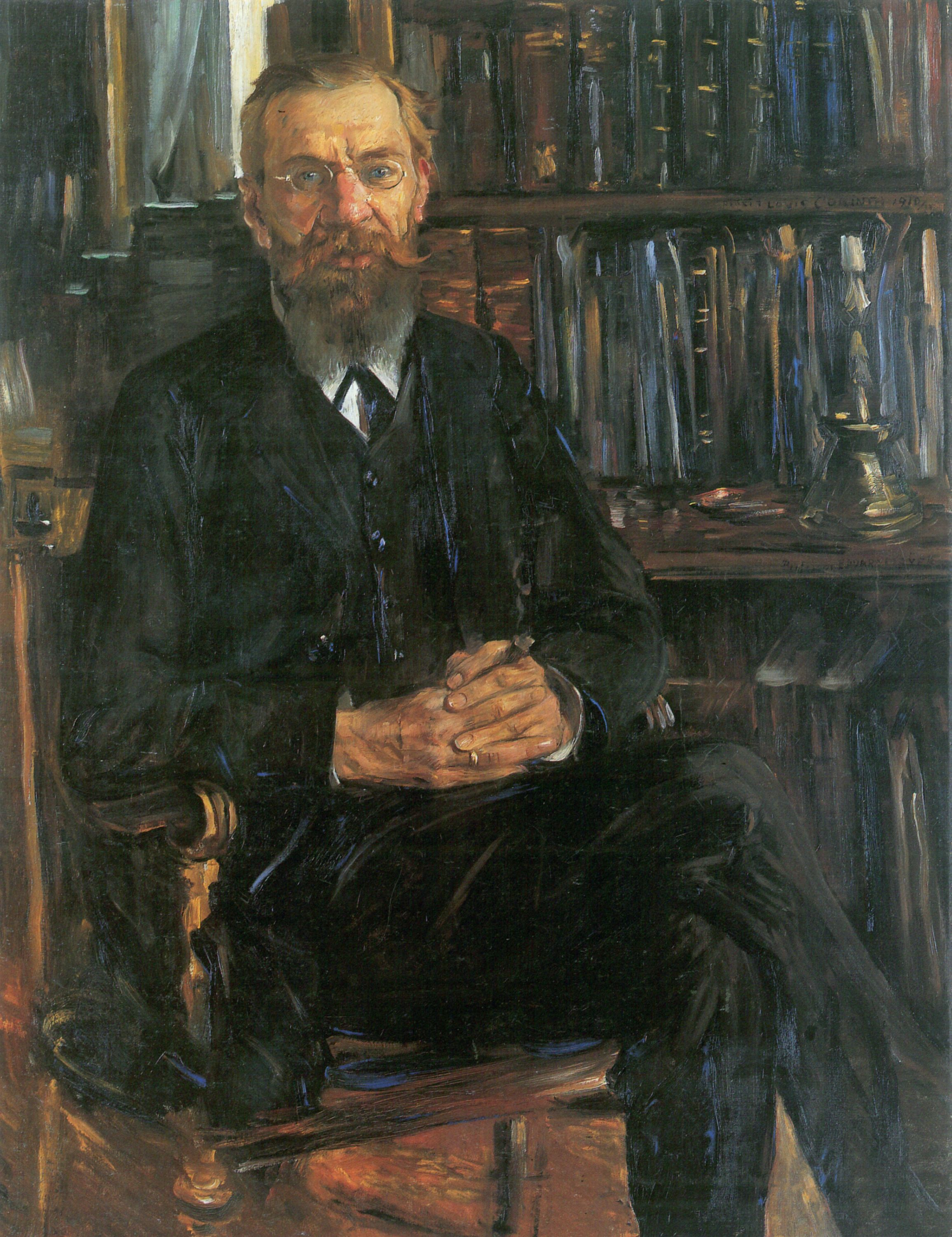
Eduard Meyer; portrait by Lovis Corinth

Eduard Meyer (25 January 1855 – 31 August 1930) was a German historian. He was the brother of Celticist Kuno Meyer (1858–1919).

== Biography ==
Meyer was born in Hamburg and educated at the Gelehrtenschule des Johanneums and later at the universities of Bonn and Leipzig. After completing his studies, he spent one year in Istanbul. In 1879, he went to the University of Leipzig as Privatdozent. He was appointed professor of ancient history at Breslau in 1885, at Halle in 1889, and at Berlin in 1902. He lectured at Harvard in 1909 and the University of Illinois, Urbana-Champaign in 1910. That same year, he was elected to the American Philosophical Society. Honorary degrees were given him by Oxford, St. Andrews, Freiburg, and Chicago universities.

He died in Berlin.

== Egyptology ==
In 1904 Meyer was the first to note the Sothic cycle of the heliacal rising of Sirius, which forms the basis for the traditional chronology of Egypt.

== Works ==
His principal work is his Geschichte des Altertums (1884–1902; third edition, 1913). He also published:

- Forschungen zur alten Geschichte (1892–1899) – Research of ancient history.
- Untersuchungen zur Geschichte der Gracchen (1894) – Investigations on the history of the Gracchi.
- Wirtschaftliche Entwicklung des Altertums (1895) – Economic development of the ancient world.
- Die Entstehung des Judentums (1896) – The origins of Judaism.
- Zur Theorie und Methodik der Geschichte (1902) – Theory and methodology of history.
- Israeliten und ihre Nachbarstämme (1906) – The Israelites and their neighboring tribes.
- Theopomps Hellenika (1909) – Theopompus' Hellenics.
- Der Papyrosfund in Elephantine (1912) – The papyrus discovery from Elephantine.
- Ursprung und Geschichte der Mormonen (1912) – Origin and history of the Mormons.
- Nordamerika und Deutschland (1915) – North America and Germany.

In English translation

- "Alexander the Great and Universal Monarchy," The International Quarterly, Vol. VIII (1903).
- England; its Political Organization and Development and the War Against Germany (1916).

He was also a contributor to the Encyclopaedia Biblica (1903), the 1911 Encyclopædia Britannica as well as to sections of The Historians' History of the World.
