= Hans Prutz =

German historian (1843–1929)

Hans Prutz (20 May 1843 – 29 January 1929) was a German historian.

== Family and early life ==
Son of Robert Eduard Prutz (1816–1872), the essayist and historian, Hans was born at Jena, Saxe-Weimar-Eisenach, and was educated at the universities of Jena and Berlin.

== Career ==
In 1865 appeared his monograph on Henry the Lion, duke of Saxony and Bavaria, which was followed by three volumes on the emperor Frederick Barbarossa (Kaiser Friedrich I., Danzig, 1871–1874). Meanwhile from 1863 to 1873 he was teaching in secondary schools. In 1874 he received a government commission to undertake explorations in Syria, particularly at Tyre, and as a result be published in 1876 Aus Phönicien, a collection of historical and geographical sketches. In the same year appeared his first work on the Crusades, Quellenbeiträge zur Geschichte der Kreuzzüge, and a series of monographs on the same subject culminated in 1883 in the notable Kulturgeschichte der Kreuzzüge. Then turning to a wider theme Prutz contributed to Oncken's university history the two volumes on the political history of Europe during the Middle Ages (Staatengeschichte des Abendlandes Im Mittelalter, Berlin, 1885–1887). In 1888 he reverted to a subject which he had touched upon in his Geheimlehre und Geheimstatuten des Tempelherrenordens (Danzig, 1879), translated into English as The Secret Teaching of the Knights Templar (2015), and wrote the history of the rise and fall of the Templars (Entwickelung und Untergang des Tempelherrenordens).

His Preussische Geschichte (4 vols., Stuttgart, 1899–1902), which is perhaps his most notable work, is an attempt to apply scientific rather than patriotic canons to a subject which has been mainly in the hands of historians with a patriotic bias. He also wrote Aus des Grossen Kurfürsten letzten Jahren (Berlin, 1897) and Bismarcks Bildung, ihre Quellen und ihre Äusserungen (Berlin, 1904).

In 1902 Prutz resigned the chair of history in the University of Königsberg, which he had held since 1877, and took up his residence at Munich.

== Articles ==
- Prutz, H. (1881). "Die Besitzungen des Johanniterordens in Palestna und Syrien". Zeitschrift des Deutschen Palästina-Vereins. 4: 157–193.
