= Mary Ammirato-Collins =

American poet

- Born: April 3, 1908 (age 117); Houston, Texas, US
- Other names: Mary Collins Ammirato
- Occupations: artist, poet

Mary Ammirato-Collins (or Mary Collins Ammirato, born April 3, 1908, date of death unknown) was an American artist from Houston, Texas.

Ammirato-Collins was a student at the Académie Julian in Paris. She exhibited at the Salon des Indépendants in 1937. Mary also had a showing of her enamels on copper during a visit to the US in Philadelphia, Pennsylvania. Mary lived in the Canary Islands with husband Claudio Ammirato, who was an artist and composer, and a physicist. Both who were long time friends of heiress Eleanor Post Hutton. Mary was a travel companion of Eleanor's and also a Ziegfeld Follies girl in New York City where she met Claudio.

Ammirato-Collins wrote the libretto for her husband's opera, Paradise Lost (A comedy for Modern Times).

== Selected exhibitions ==
- 1973 – Woodstock Gallery, London, United Kingdom (first one-woman exhibition)
- 1974 – Art Alliance, Philadelphia, United States (first American exhibition)
- 1976 – Casino de Tenerife, Spain
- 1976 – Provincial Palace, Zaragoza, Spain

== Books ==
Ammirato was the author of several books of poems, some of which were illustrated by her husband Claudio Ammirato:

- The Beach at Sierra Helada (1935)
- Tapestry of Sleep (1936)
- Dustless Beauty (1937)
- Palm Tree Daughters (1938)
- Red Apples of Fall (1947)
- Spring in Olympus (1939).
