= Ludwig Häusser =

German historian (1818–1867)

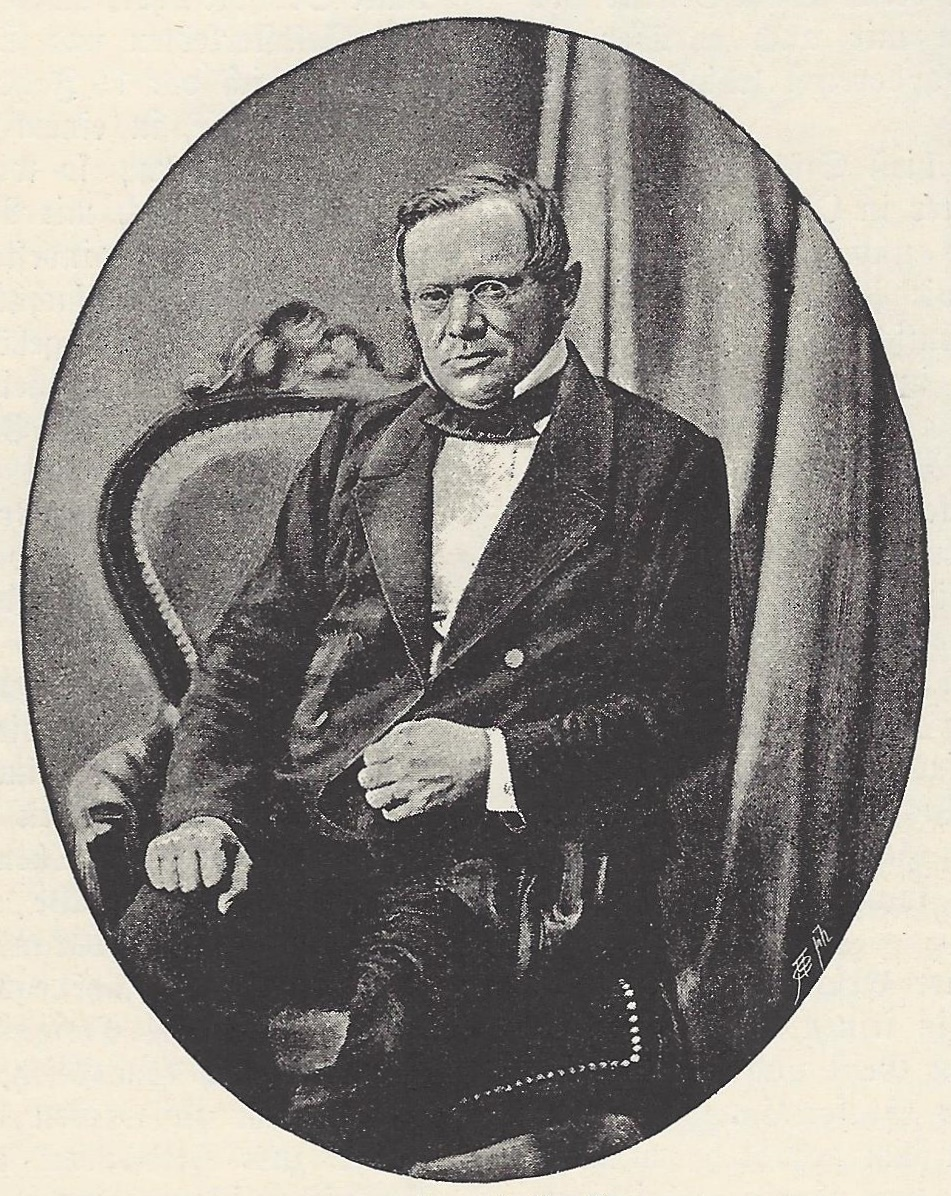
- Born: 26 October 1818; Cleebourg, France
- Died: 19 March 1867 (aged 48); Heidelberg, Germany

Academic background
- Education: Heidelberg University (PhD)
- Doctoral advisor: Friedrich Christoph Schlosser

Academic work
- Institutions: Heidelberg University
- Doctoral students: Hermann Eduard von Holst

Signature
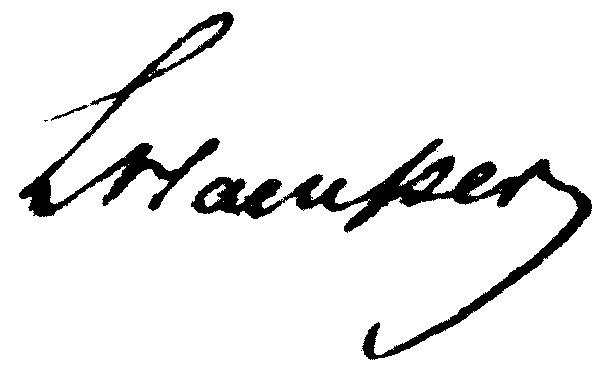

Ludwig Häusser (26 October 1818 – 17 March 1867) was a German historian.

== Biography ==
Häusser was born at Cleebourg, in Alsace. Studying philology at Heidelberg in 1835, he was led by F. C. Schlosser to give it up for history, and after continuing his historical work at Jena and teaching in the gymnasium at Wertheim he made his mark by his Die teutschen Geschichtsschreiber vom Anfang des Frankenreichs bis auf die Hohenstaufen (1839). Next year appeared his Sage von Tell.

After a short period of study in Paris on the French Revolution, he spent some time working in the archives of Baden and Bavaria, and published in 1845 Die Geschichte der rheinischen Pfalz, which won for him a professorship extraordinarius at Heidelberg. In 1850 he became professor ordinarius. Häusser also interested himself in politics while at Heidelberg, publishing in 1846 Schleswig-Holstein, Danemark und Deutschland, and editing with Gervinus the Deutsche Zeitung.

In 1848 he was elected to the lower legislative chamber of Baden, and in 1850 advocated the project of union with Prussia at the parliament held at Erfurt. Another timely work was his edition of Friedrich List's Gesammelte Schriften (1850), accompanied with a life of the author.

His greatest achievement, and the one on which his fame as an historian rests, is his Deutsche Geschichte vom Tode Friedrichs des Grossen bis zur Gründung des deutschen Bundes (Leipzig, 1854–1857, 4 vols). This was the first work covering that period based on a scientific study of the archival sources.

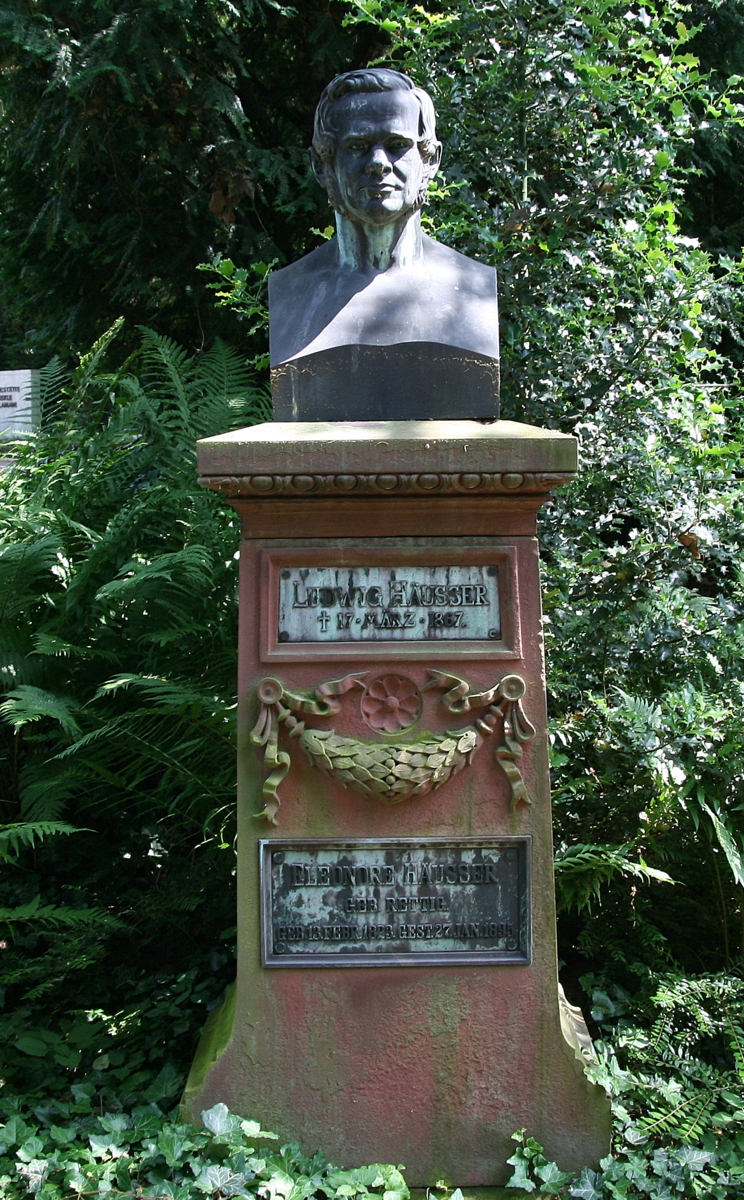
Grave in Heidelberg

In 1859 he again took part in politics, resuming his place in the lower chamber, opposing in 1863 the project of Austria for the reform of the Confederation brought forward in the assembly of princes at Frankfort, in his book Die Reform des deutschen Bundestages, and becoming one of the leaders of the little German (kleindeutsche) party, which advocated the exclusion of Austria from Germany.

In addition to various essays (in his Gesammelte Schriften, Berlin, 1869, 1870, 2 vols.), Häusser's lectures have been edited by Wilhelm Oncken in the Geschichte des Zeitalters der Reformation (1868, 2nd ed. 1880), and Geschichte der französischen Revolution (1867, 2nd ed. 1870). These lectures reveal all the charm of style and directness of presentation which made Häusser's work as a professor so vital.
