= Wilhelm Oncken =

German historian (1838–1905)

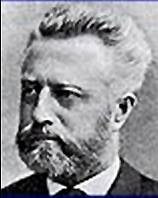
- Born: 19 December 1838; Heidelberg, German Confederation
- Died: 11 August 1905 (aged 66); Gießen, German Empire
- Occupation: Historian

Christian Friedrich Georg Wilhelm Oncken (19 December 1838 – 11 August 1905) was a German historian.

== Biography ==
Oncken was born in Heidelberg to Anton Wilhelm Oncken, a lawyer and intellectual, and his wife Marie Eleonare Thaden. He was the brother of economist August Oncken.

After his early education, Oncken studied classical philology, history and philosophy in Heidelberg, Göttingen and Berlin. In 1856, during his studies, he became a member of the Frankonia Heidelberg student society. He studied under historian Ludwig Häusser and graduated with a doctorate in 1862; in 1866, after a period as a private tutor, he became an Außerordentlicher Professor (professor without chair) of history at Heidelberg, specializing in Greek antiquity. Oncken was a typical nineteenth-century national liberal, using history as a means of national political education.

In 1870 he was appointed a professor of history at the University of Gießen. Although he originally continued his work on the history of ancient Greece, he later turned to the history of Prussia and the topic of German unification. He aligned himself with the National Liberal Party (Germany), serving as a delegate to the Hessian and national governments, and came to see his work teaching history as a means of national political education. He remained at Gießen for his entire career, declining an appointment to the University of Königsberg in 1873, and served as its chancellor in 1877–78. He was also a member and sometime leader of the Gießen Masonic lodge "Ludwig zur Treue".

Oncken published his most famous work, Allgemeine Geschichte in Einzeldarstellungen (Common History in Monographs) in 44 volumes, issued from 1876 to 1891. He delivered countless public lectures on the history of Germany, held throughout the country. Wilhem I commissioned Oncken to write his biography; however, the work, Das Zeitalter des Kaisers Wilhelm (The Era of Kaiser Wilhelm) was published two years after Wilhelm's death in 1888.

In 1900 the university recognized him with emeritus status. He died on 11 August 1905 in Gießen, at the age of 67 years.

== Books ==
- Athen und Hellas. Forschungen zur nationalen und politischen Geschichte der alten Griechen. 1865/66.
- Stadt, Schloß und Hochschule Heidelberg, Bilder aus ihrer Vergangenheit. 1874.
- Oesterreich und Preussen im Befreiungskriege. 1876/79.
- Das Zeitalter Friedrichs des Grossen. 1880/81.
- Zeitalter der Revolution, des Kaiserreichs und der Befreiungskriege. 1884/86.
- Das Zeitalter des Kaisers Wilhelm. 1890.
