= Eye for an Eye (disambiguation) =

An eye for an eye is a quotation from Exodus 21:23–27, expressing a principle of retributive justice.

Eye for an Eye, An Eye for an Eye, or Eye for Eye may also refer to:

== Film ==
- Eye for Eye (1918 film), a film starring Alla Nazimova
- An Eye for an Eye (1957 film), originally titled Oeil pour oeil a film starring Curd Jürgens (usually billed in English-speaking films as Curt Jurgens)
- An Eye for an Eye (1966 film), a film starring Slim Pickens
- Drummer of Vengeance or An Eye for an Eye original titled Il giorno del giudizio, a 1971 Italian Spaghetti Western directed by Mario Gariazzo
- Three Ruthless Ones or Eye for an Eye original titled El sabor de la venganza, a 1971 Italian/Spanish Western directed by Joaquin L. Romero Marchent
- An Eye for an Eye, a 1973 horror thriller film starring John Ashton
- An Eye for an Eye (1981 film), a film starring Chuck Norris
- Eye for an Eye (1996 film), a film starring Sally Field, Kiefer Sutherland and Ed Harris
- An Eye for an Eye (1999 film), a Finnish horror film starring Meri Nenonen and Jani Volanen
- Eye for an Eye (2008 film), a South Korean film starring Han Suk-kyu
- An Eye for an Eye (2016 film), a documentary film
- The Poison Rose, also known as An Eye for an Eye, a 2019 American film
- Eye for an Eye (2019 film), a Spanish film
- Kannum Kannum Kollaiyadithaal (Eye for an Eye), a 2020 Indian Tamil-language film by Desingh Periyasamy
- An Eye for an Eye (2025 film), a documentary film
- Eye for an Eye (2025 film), an American horror film

== Literature ==
- An Eye for an Eye (novel), an 1879 novel by Anthony Trollope
- An Eye for an Eye, a 1900 novel by William Le Queux
- An Eye for an Eye (French: Oeil pour oeil), a 1955 novel by Vahé Katcha
- An Eye for an Eye, a 1957 novel by Leigh Brackett
- "An Eye for an Eye", a 1988–89 three-part Punisher storyline by Carl Potts, featured in the comic book series The Punisher War Journal
- An Eye for an Eye, a 1990 novel by Joseph Telushkin
- Eye for an Eye, a 1993 novel by Erika Holzer
- An Eye for an Eye (Sack book), a 1993 history book by John Sack
- An Eye for an Eye: The Doll, a 1996 novel, the first installment in the serialized novel The Blackstone Chronicles, by John Saul
- An Eye for an Eye, a 2003 novella in the Noughts & Crosses series by Malorie Blackman

== Music ==
- Eye for an Eye (Corrosion of Conformity album) (1984)
- An Eye for an Eye (Like Moths to Flames album) (2013)
- An Eye for an Eye (RBL Posse album)
- Eye for an Eye (Twilight album) (1994)
- "Eye for an Eye" (song), a 1998 song by Soulfly
- "Eye for an Eye (Your Beef Is Mines)", a 1995 song by Mobb Deep from The Infamous
- "Eye for an Eye", a 2003 single by Unkle
- "Eye for an Eye", a song by Quiet Riot from Quiet Riot II
- "Eye for an Eye", a song by Rina Sawayama from the movie John Wick: Chapter 4

== Television ==
- Eye for an Eye (2003 TV program), an American comedy courtroom reality television program that was broadcast in syndication
- Eye for an Eye (2010 TV series), an American Spanish-language telenovela that aired on Telemundo
- An Eye for an Eye (Thai TV series), a Thai television series that aired on GMM 25
- "Eye for an Eye", an episode of Danny Phantom
- "An Eye for an Eye", an episode of NCIS
- "Eye for an Eye", an episode of War of the Worlds

== Other ==
- An Eye for an Eye (Champions), a 1994 supplement for the role-playing game Champions

== See also ==
- Eye for Eye, a 1987 novella by Orson Scott Card
- Eye to Eye (disambiguation)
- Lex talionis (disambiguation)
