= High Flyers (Singaporean TV series) =

- Title card of High Flyers
- Presented by: Haslinda Amin
- Country of origin: Singapore
- Original language: English
- No. of series: 4

Production
- Production locations: Singapore Flyer, Singapore
- Camera setup: Multi-camera
- Running time: 30 minutes (inc. adverts)
- Production company: AsiaWorks

Original release
- Network: Bloomberg Television
- Release: 2011 – present

High Flyers is a business-themed television interview program, hosted by Haslinda Amin, which airs in selected regions on Bloomberg Television.

In each episode, Haslinda interviews prominent or senior business figures inside one of the passenger capsules of the Singapore Flyer Ferris wheel in Singapore. Multiple cameras, technical equipment and crew are present in the capsule as it completes a full revolution of the wheel during filming.

The initial series was sponsored by ANZ.

== Broadcast ==
The series premiered in 2011 on Bloomberg Television's Asia Pacific feeds. An eight episode second season premiered in 2013, which also aired in Bloomberg's EMEA markets. The third season premiered on 6 June 2014 and a fourth season of the program premiered on 23 July 2015.

== Guests ==
The following business leaders have been interviewed on High Flyers:

=== Season 1 ===
- Sandiaga Uno, co-founder of Saratoga Capital
- Tony Fernandes, CEO of AirAsia
- Ho Kwon Ping, founder of Banyan Tree Holdings

=== Season 2 ===
- Tony Fernandes, Group Chief Executive Director of AirAsia
- Jimmy Choo, founder of the luxury shoemaker
- Tetsuya Wakuda, celebrity chef and restaurateur
- Erick Thohir, media mogul
- Mokhzani Mahathir, the Executive Vice-chairman of Sapura Kencana

=== Season 3 ===
- Malvinder Singh, Fortis Healthcare. Aired 6 June 2014.
- Noni Purnomo, BlueBird Group. Aired 13 June 2014.
- Justin Quek, celebrity chef. Aired 20 June 2014.
- Thomas Flohr, founder of VistaJet. Aired 27 June 2014.
- Sudhitham Chirathivat. Aired 11 July 2014.
- Peter Bond, CEO of Link Energy. Aired 18 July 2014.
- Ashley Isham, fashion designer. Aired 24 July 2014.
- Hiroshi Mikitani, CEO of Rakuten. Aired 31 July 2014.
- Alain Li, CEO of Richemont. Aired 7 August 2014.
- Hary Tanoesoedibjo, CEO of MNC Group. Aired 14 August 2014.
- Ken Dean Lawadinata. Aired 21 August 2014.
- Merrill Fernando and Dilhan Fernando, founders of Dilmah. Aired 28 August 2014.

=== Season 4 ===
- Ruslan Kogan, founder of Kogan.com. Aired 24 July 2015.
- Rosaline Koo, founder of ConnecXionsAsia (CXA). Aired 30 July 2015.
- Anthony Tan, founder of GrabTaxi. Aired 6 August 2015.
- Apichart Chutrakul, developer in Thailand. Aired 13 August 2015.
- Kiran Mazumdar-Shaw, founder of Biocon. Aired 20 August 2015.
- Harald and Caroline Link, founding family of B. Grimm. Aired 27 August 2015.
- Dato Sri Tahir, founder of Mayapada Group in Indonesia. Aired 3 September 2015.
- Henry Nguyen, CEO of Vietnam's first venture capital fund. Aired 10 September 2015.
- Ruben Gnanalingam, CEO of Westports. Aired 17 September 2015.
- Serge Pun and Melvyn Pun, Myanmar business family. Aired 24 September 2015.
- David Thompson, Australian chef. Aired 1 October 2015.
- The Mouawad Family, family of jewelers. Aired 8 October 2015.

=== Season 5 ===
- Arun Pudur, founder - CEO of Celframe. Aired 7 July 2016

== Technical ==
The production has filmed the series using the Sony EX-3 camera, Canon C300 and GoPros.

== Awards ==
List of accolades
Year	Award	Category	Recipient(s)	Result
2014	Asian Television Awards	Best Talk Show	High Flyers	Nominated

== See also ==
- Eye to Eye, a similar program taking place on the London Eye.
