= Perfect Nightmare =

Perfect Nightmare may refer to:

- Perfect Nightmare (song), a 2010 song by Shontelle
- Perfect Nightmare (novel), a 2005 novel by John Saul
