= Faces of Fear (Saul novel) =

2008 novel by John Saul

- Paperback edition
- Author: John Saul
- Language: English
- Genre: Novel
- Publisher: Ballantine Books
- Publication date: August 12, 2008
- Publication place: United States
- Media type: Print (hardcover & paperback)
- Pages: 324
- ISBN: 978-0-345-48705-6
- Preceded by: The Devil's Labyrinth
- Followed by: House of Reckoning

Faces of Fear is a thriller horror novel by John Saul, published by Ballantine Books on August 12, 2008. The novel follows the story of teenage Alison Shaw, who finds a shocking background behind her mother's new husband, who is a plastic surgeon.

== Plot ==
Fifteen-year-old Alison Shaw never really cared about her looks. But her mother, Risa, knows that success can reflect on your beauty. And thus, she marries plastic surgeon Conrad Dunn, who says he can transform Alison into a lovely young lady. Risa and Alison move with Conrad to Bel Air, Los Angeles, where Alison eventually agrees to undergo the procedure.

However, Alison soon finds an old photo of Conrad's first wife, and realizes the shocking resemblance between her face and the face that Conrad will give Alison. When Risa continuously refuses to see the resemblance, Alison continues to look into her stepfather's sketchy past, and worries that all these secrets he is hiding may turn into a horrifying reality.

== Critical reception ==
Reception for Faces of Fear was mixed. Publishers Weekly said, "The motive for the killings and the eventual outcome will surprise few readers. The basic premise has a plot hole big enough to fit a truck, but Saul fans may not notice or care if they do." Bookreporter's Ray Palen said, "With Faces of Fear, Saul keeps these fears alive, which makes for another entertaining read." Library Journal's Kristen L. Smith said, "Fertile ground for social commentary, but a fairly predictable plot for a thriller."
