= Suffer the Children (novel) =

1977 novel by John Saul

- Hardcover edition
- Author: John Saul
- Language: English
- Genre: Novel
- Publisher: Dell Publishing
- Publication date: 1977
- Publication place: United States
- Media type: Print (hardback & paperback)
- Followed by: Punish the Sinners

Suffer the Children is the debut novel by author John Saul, first published by Dell Publishing in 1977. The novel follows the story of a child abductor, who murders a young girl one hundred years earlier. The young girl returns and begins taking out more children one by one. Suffer the Children was initially published in paperback and has sold over a million copies since its release.

== Plot ==
After a young girl is murdered one hundred years earlier in Port Arbello prior to the beginning of the novel, the one responsible comes back and begins taking out more children, one by one. As people scramble to find the culprit, everyone comes to a shocking realization that an evil history is repeating itself.

== Development ==
Saul claims that the book took him 28 days to write and due to his editor's response to the title, he wrote another book before the first was published. Of the subject matter, Saul stated that "I always find ... that when you have a scary scene, it broadens the scope of possibilities if you have children involved."
