= Mighty Ape =

Online retailer in New Zealand

Mighty Ape Ltd
- Type: Private company
- Industry: Retail
- Founded: 1999 (as Virtual Stores); 2008 (as Mighty Ape)
- Founder: Simon Barton
- Headquarters: Auckland, New Zealand
- Area served: New Zealand
- Number of employees: 120 full-time
- Parent: Kogan.com
- Website: www.mightyape.co.nz, www.mightyape.com.au

Mighty Ape Ltd is an online retailing company founded and operating in New Zealand since 1999, and owned by Australian company Kogan.com since 2020. Formerly known as Gameplanet Store, it is one of the longest running online retailers in New Zealand.

Founded by Simon Barton as Virtual Stores (NZ), Ltd. in 1999, the company began by selling computer and video games under the GameZone brand. In 2003 the business rebranded to Gameplanet Store (or GP Store). Over the following years the product range expanded to include DVD movies, PC hardware and music. In 2008 the company relaunched as Mighty Ape and began selling books and toys.

== History ==
Simon Barton first founded Micro-World in 1993, a small retail store in Mt Eden, Auckland, that sold Amiga computers. When Amiga production ceased, the business shifted its focus to selling video games and rebranded to GameZone. Several other stores were opened in Auckland; however this proved unsuccessful, and GameZone reverted to having one store (on Symonds St in the Auckland CBD), run with the help of Zane Hemingway. GameZone became well known for its large-scale product launch parties, including one for the original PlayStation.

GameZone created its first e-commerce website in 1998, allowing the company to begin selling video games online and cater to a wider customer base. The site was mostly developed by Simon Garner, whom Simon Barton later partnered with in 2000 to start a separate venture called Gameplanet, a gaming website which publishes video game news, reviews, previews, downloads and community forums.

GameZone began operating under the company name Virtual Stores (NZ), Ltd in 1999.

In 2003, GameZone was rebranded as Gameplanet Store (or GP Store). This coincided with the closure of the Symonds St store and opening of a new retail store on Dominion Rd in Mt Eden, and the launch of a new web site.

As GP Store grew, the product range gradually expanded to include DVD movies, PC hardware and music. While the e-commerce side of the business went from strength to strength, the retail store in Mt Eden was not so successful. In 2007 the retail store was closed, enabling the company to focus entirely on its e-commerce operations.

With the increasingly diverse range of products on offer, a new brand was sought that would fit better with the company's ambitions, and in November 2008, the business was relaunched as Mighty Ape and began selling books and toys. The database and applications running the web site had to be largely redesigned to handle an increase in the number of products sold from some tens of thousands of games to now listing over six million products including games, books, movies, home and office products, toys and collectibles, music, electronics and computers.

In early 2011 Mighty Ape launched a new feature called Mighty Ape Marketplace, which allows users to sell second hand items to other customers on the site. The used items appear on Mighty Ape product pages together with items sold by the company, but are shipped from the user selling the item directly to the customer. When a user purchases a Marketplace item, Mighty Ape handles payment processing and holds the money in pseudo-escrow until the purchaser confirms they have received the item successfully. This allows Mighty Ape to offer a "Marketplace Safety Guarantee" with a 100% refund under certain conditions. Mighty Ape takes a 9% commission on each sale.

In 2013 Mighty Ape launched a new online shopping site specialising in everyday household items. Mighty Mart stocks over 200 items such as bathroom and cleaning products, baby-care products, pet food, drinks, non-perishable food items such as pasta, pasta sauces etc. It offers featured deals which are changed daily.

In 2014 Mighty Ape launched its same day delivery service in New Zealand's main centres: Auckland, Wellington and Christchurch. The company continued to grow at a healthy rate and went on to win the Westpac Supreme Business Excellence Award and Excellence in Customer Service Delivery Award. Mighty Ape launched DHL express shipping to Australia.

Mighty Ape's current distribution centre opened in the Millwater suburb of Silverdale, Auckland in 2018.

In November 2020, Mighty Ape delisted right wing blogger and author Olivia Pierson's book Western Values Defended: A Primer following her controversial Twitter post mocking the newly appointed Foreign Minister Nanaia Mahuta's Māori face tattoo. Pierson alleged that she was the victim of "cancel culture" while fellow blogger Cameron Slater claimed that Mighty Ape was being hypocritical for stocking books published by Oswald Mosley and Joseph Goebbels.

On 2 December 2020, Mighty Ape was acquired by Australian retail and insurance company Kogan.com for A$122.4 million.

=== Developments since 2020 ===
Following its acquisition by Australian online retailer Kogan.com in December 2020, Mighty Ape entered a phase of expansion and digital transformation.

In late 2021, the company launched Jungle Express, a same-day delivery service available seven days a week in Auckland, later expanding to Wellington and Christchurch.

In March 2022, Mighty Ape received the Canstar Blue Most Satisfied Customers Award for online retailers in New Zealand, based on criteria including ease of site navigation, range of brands and products, speed of delivery, value for money and overall satisfaction.

In June 2022, Gracie MacKinlay was appointed CEO after more than a decade with the business in various leadership roles. In 2022, Mighty Ape received the Excellence in Customer Service Delivery award at the Westpac Auckland Business Awards, and in 2023, it ranked #1 in the Kantar Customer Leadership Index. That same year, the company opened a new distribution centre in Christchurch and launched Mighty Mobile, a mobile virtual network service operated on the One NZ network. The 2023 Christmas season marked a new sales record.

In April 2024, MacKinlay stepped down as CEO and was succeeded by then-CFO Dan Balasoglou, who had joined Mighty Ape in May 2023. Around the same time, Mighty Ape’s parent company Kogan.com came under scrutiny after its two executive directors, CEO Ruslan Kogan and CFO David Shafer, received a combined more than $17 million from exercising share options shortly before a trading downgrade. The ASX issued a compliance inquiry over governance and disclosure timing.

In mid-2024, the company expanded into travel services with Mighty Ape Travel, offering flights and vacation packages.

In October 2024, Mighty Ape launched a major platform relaunch to introduce new features such as a third-party marketplace. The launch was accompanied by widespread usability issues. Customers expressed frustration on social media and forums. In the half year results ending December 2024 and four month results to April 2025, parent company Kogan.com reported significant declines in revenue and adjusted EBITDA for Mighty Ape, citing the platform relaunch and operational disruptions as contributing factors. Dan Balasoglou departed the role following a brief tenure as CEO in February 2025, and Robert McEwan—appointed in 2024 as General Manager of Operations and Customer Service—was subsequently named Managing Director.

In May 2025, a second wave of customer complaints emerged following a confirmed privacy breach, in which users were able to view other customers’ accounts—exposing names, addresses, order histories, and partial payment data. Consumer NZ criticised the company for the delayed response and lack of direct communication. On 6 June 2025, the Office of the Privacy Commissioner confirmed a formal investigation under the Privacy Act 2020.

== Awards ==
Net Guide Web Awards
Year	Category	Website
2004	Best Online Store	as GP Store
2007	Best Online Shopping Site	as GP Store
2008	Best Online Shopping Site	as Mighty Ape
2009	Best Online Shopping Site	as Mighty Ape
2009	Best New Site, Relaunch or Innovation	as Mighty Ape
2010	Best Site for Gamers	as Mighty Ape
2011	Best Shopping Site	as Mighty Ape
2011	Best Site for Gamers	as Mighty Ape
2012	Best Shopping Site	as Mighty Ape
2012	Best Site for Gamers	as Mighty Ape
2012	Best Social Networking Page	as Mighty Ape
2012	Overall Best Site	as Mighty Ape
2014	Westpac Supreme Business Excellence Award	as Mighty Ape
2014	Westpac Excellence in Customer Service Delivery	as Mighty Ape

== See also ==
- E-commerce
- Internet in New Zealand
