= The Manhattan Hunt Club =

2001 novel by John Saul

- Paperback edition
- Author: John Saul
- Language: English
- Genre: Novel
- Publisher: Ballantine Books
- Publication date: July 31, 2001
- Publication place: United States
- Media type: Print (hardcover & paperback)
- Pages: 313 (first edition)
- ISBN: 0-345-43330-0
- Preceded by: Nightshade
- Followed by: Midnight Voices

The Manhattan Hunt Club is a thriller horror novel by John Saul, published by Ballantine Books on July 31, 2001. The novel follows the story of Jeff Converse, who is falsely convicted of a brutal crime and finds himself trapped in a secret society called the Manhattan Hunt Club.

== Plot ==
When Jeff Converse is convicted of a brutal crime he did not commit, he sees his bright future slipping away from him. Then, he is suddenly whisked away to a secret underground Manhattan society with mysterious, twisting tunnels and chambers, where darkness lurks around every corner. He sees the eerie underground group of the homeless and the mad, and realizes what he has to do. Jeff must now find a way to escape alive from this living hell, with only his bare hands and his wit.

== Critical reception ==
Booklist called The Manhattan Hunt Club an "enjoyable and clever yarn", praising the book's "plot twists, improbable conspiracies, and lots of two-faced characters". Publishers Weekly wrote that the book "skirts absurdity, as do the villainous members of the club, but Saul scores points about society's treatment of the homeless" and that it was "vintage Saul". People Magazine stated "Stirring social commentary, this ain't, but it's a hot tome for summer in the city." Kirkus Reviews criticized The Manhattan Hunt Club's "barely believable premise" but praised the book's research and "supportive subplots". RT Book Reviews gave The Manhattan Hunt Club three stars, writing "Although his trademark elements of supernatural horror are missing, fans won't be disappointed".
