= Lex talionis (disambiguation) =

The Latin phrase Lex talionis refers to the legal principle of exact retaliation. It is a principle developed in early Mesopotamian law and is also present in the Bible as "an eye for an eye". It may also refer to:

Law

- Declaration of Lex Talionis — developed during the First English Civil War (1642–1646) as practical—rather than moral—mutual restraint by the parties to the war on how they treated prisoners of war
- Lex Talionis Fraternitas Inc. Sodalitas Ducum Futurorum — an exclusive fraternal organization of Filipino jurists, legal practitioners, and law students founded on September 28, 1969

Arts

- Lex Talionis (1989) — an album by English neofolk band Sol Invictus
- Lex Talionis (1994) — an album by American death metal band Acheron
- Lex Talionis (2016) — a Bollywood film starring Akash Dhar and Anya Singh

== See also ==
- Eye for an eye (disambiguation)
