= Black Creek Crossing =

2004 novel by John Saul

- Hardcover edition
- Author: John Saul
- Cover artist: Phil Heffernan
- Language: English
- Genre: Thriller Horror novel
- Publisher: Ballantine Books
- Publication date: March 16, 2004
- Publication place: United States
- Media type: Print (hardback & paperback)
- Pages: 368
- ISBN: 0-345-43332-7
- Preceded by: Midnight Voices
- Followed by: Perfect Nightmare

Black Creek Crossing is a thriller horror novel by John Saul, published by Ballantine Books on March 16, 2004. The novel follows the story of teenage Angel Sullivan, who moves into a new house in a new town with her family, and she learns of a brutal murder that occurred in her new home, and begins to think it may be haunted.

== Plot ==
Marty Sullivan is fired from his construction job when he drunkenly injures a coworker. At the same time, his wife Myra’s sister Joni Fletcher, who is a real estate agent, calls to tell her she has found an extremely affordable house for the family in Roundtree, where she lives with her husband Ed and son Zach. Realizing Marty is unlikely to find more work in their area, the Sullivans decide to at least look at the house.

Myra has misgivings when she learns the reason the house is so cheap is because one of the former owners had killed his wife and child there years before. No one wanted the house after that, and it could not be torn down due to it being 300 years old, so the price was incredibly low.

The first night in the house, Angel, the Sullivan’s teen daughter, has a disturbing dream of a girl on fire standing in her closet. She also finds a cat, whom she names Houdini, because he comes and goes as he pleases.

On the first day of school, Angel meets and befriends Seth Baker, a small, shy boy whom a lot of the other kids pick on.. Angie tells Seth about her strange dream, and Seth tells Angie that he has been taking pictures of the house recently, including one in which the house appears to be on fire, and one which Seth believes shows an image of a ghost.

Meanwhile, despite Ed Fletcher giving him a good job, Marty gets suspended on his first day of work for unsafe practices that end up injuring both himself and his new boss. He leaves work, gets drunk and comes to find Seth in Angel’s room which enrages him. He physically throws Seth out of the house and calls Angel a whore. He also removes the lock from Angel’s door.

That night he goes to Angel’s room and begins to fondle her but is attacked and driven off by Houdini. Terrified, Angel convinces herself she dreamed the whole thing until the next morning when Marty comes to breakfast with a bandaged face. Angel tries to tell Myra what happened but Myra slaps her and calls her a liar.

While having lunch with Joni, Myra learns there are a lot more rumors about her new home than what Joni let on. The rumors are the house is haunted, and no one lives in it for more than a few months at a time. There has also been a history of suicides connected to the house.

Angel and Seth do some exploring at Angel’s house and find an old book hidden in a false step. Houdini leads the teens through the woods to a small, well-hidden log cabin. At the log cabin, they open the book, which seems to be some sort of recipe or guide book for ancient remedies, but the book is so old and the script in it so ornate they have a hard time figuring out what it says. They decide to hide the book in the cabin and do some research on where it might have come from before coming back to try to read it.

They soon learn the book is a spell book, used for witchcraft. While researching at the local library, they learn two former residents of Angel’s house, Margaret and Forbearance Wynton, were accused of witchcraft in the 1600s and burned to death under the round tree the town was named for.

While walking home from the library, Zach and a couple of friends from school hide in the woods to scare Angel. Zach walks home, but is attacked by Houdini who badly scratches his face. However, by the time Zach makes it home, the scratches are gone, though he can still feel their pain. Houdini also attacks Chad and Jared, the two other boys who had been with Zach.

The next day, the three kill Houdini and leave him inside Angel’s locker. Seth and Angel bury Houdini by the cabin in the woods, and Angel decides she wants to try one of the spells in the book, and maybe see if it will do anything to Zach and his friends. They perform a spell titled "grief.". After drinking the potion, Angel realizes her grief is gone.

When she gets back home, a drunken Marty confronts her about where she has been all day, and Angel runs to her room. Marty tries to follow, but Houdini, back from the dead, stops him on the stairs and is about to attack him when Myra gets home. The next day Houdini attacks Marty again, this time in full view of Myra who sees the cat turn into a girl in an old-fashioned dress, and then dissolve into a skeleton.

Angel and Seth dig up Houdini’s grave and confirm he is not there. They perform a spell called “Spring” even though they are not sure what it is supposed to do. Back at home, Marty attacks Angel after seeing her with Houdini, but Angel is able to levitate Marty and throw him down the stairs. That same night on the other side of town, Zach tries to ambush Seth, but Seth is able to levitate Zach and smash him against a tree.

That same night, a drunk Marty once again tries to molest Angel, but she uses the last push of power from the “Spring” spell to push him away. The next day, both Angel and Seth go to school with a new sense of safety, realizing that they have some control over what their bullies can do to them now.

Angel comes to realize that Forbearance had also been molested by her father, and guesses that more than likely, the man who murdered his family in the old house was doing the same to his daughter. She feels as if the house itself keeps reenacting the past over and over with all its new occupants.

Angel finds a spell in the book called “Reckoning” that promises to turn pain away from the caster and onto their enemy. Seth and Angel try the spell and as he is walking home Seth is abused by Chad and Jared. Chad plans to cut Seth with a broken bottle but ends up turning it on himself when he tries to attack Seth. Chad runs away, but when he gets home, he sees Seth’s face in his bathroom mirror, picks up a straight razor and cuts his own throat.

Seth’s father tries to beat him with a belt but Seth makes him turn the belt on himself. Seth’s mother hears the commotion and tries to intervene but is accidentally killed by Seth’s father, who then falls down the stairs and is also killed.

At the same time, a very drunk Marty attacks Angel with a knife. Instead of hurting Angel though, he stabs himself in the eye. As he staggers out of Angel’s room, blind and still clutching the knife, he runs straight into Mayra, killing her.

The next day, the local Catholic priest wakes to find Angel and Seth have hanged themselves from the round tree.

In an epilogue we learn a woman named Margie Flint plans to buy the house. She has a husband and a teen daughter, and her maiden name was Wynton.

== Reception ==
Critical reception for Black Creek Crossing was positive, with Booklist calling it "remarkably gratifying". Book Reporter's Joe Hartlaub praised the book, saying that "Saul's ultimate strength in Black Creek Crossing... is his ability to explore the world of adolescent angst, to get into those areas where the triple gratings of school, friends and family rub the skin of the psyche raw." Blogcritics.org praised the book, calling it "a respectable read, if not a home run."

Publishers Weekly panned Black Creek Crossing, writing "the chills are few and far between in this lackluster, paint-by-the-numbers horror tale".

== Footnotes ==
- Saul, John (2004). Black Creek Crossing (1st ed.). New York City: Ballantine. ISBN 0-345-43332-7.
