= Gameplanet =

Video game news website

Gameplanet (NZ), Ltd
- Industry: Video game journalism
- Founded: September 13, 2000; 26 years ago
- Founder: Simon Garner, Simon Barton
- Defunct: April 29, 2020; 6 years ago
- Headquarters: Albany, Auckland, New Zealand
- Number of employees: 1-3
- Parent: Mighty Ape
- Website: web.archive.org/web/20201014102301/https://www.gameplanet.co.nz/

Gameplanet was a video gaming website that provided news, reviews, previews, videos, and other information. It was the largest video gaming website in New Zealand. Gameplanet New Zealand, despite having the same name as the biggest specialised videogame retailer in Mexico, has no connection to Gameplanet S.A.. Gameplanet also operated GP Forums, an online forum community site covering video games as well as various other topics.

Gameplanet won the NetGuide People's Choice Web Award for "Best Game Related Site" four years running, in 2006, 2007, 2008 and 2009. It also won the award for "Best Youth Site" in 2002.

== History ==
In 1999, Simon Garner created the first Counter-Strike game server in New Zealand. At that time, Garner was involved in the development and hosting of the web site for GameZone, a small games retail business owned by fellow entrepreneur Simon Barton. The Counter-Strike server was run under the GameZone name.

The GameZone Counter-Strike server quickly became popular (and was soon followed by servers from other providers operating at the time, such as Paradise.Net and Jetstream Games). In early 2000, Simon Garner launched a Counter-Strike community site called Counter-Strike NZ (CSNZ). The site covered the latest news about the game and provided forums for players to discuss topics related to the game, arrange matches and form clans.

Gameplanet was the brainchild of GameZone owner Simon Barton. The original concept of the site was to combine magazine-style editorial content such as news and reviews with an interactive online gaming community, expanding upon the success of CSNZ by incorporating forums, game servers, tournaments and competitions for a range of different games. Simon Garner designed and developed the Gameplanet website, which launched in September 2000. Thomas Mahoney was the site's first editor in chief.

After the launch of Gameplanet, Counter-Strike NZ was folded into Gameplanet as part of the "Gameplanet Network", which was over time expanded with additional community sites covering PlayStation 2 (PS2NZ), Day of Defeat (DODNZ), Black & White (BWNZ), Xbox (XBNZ) and Half-Life 2 (HL2NZ). Each site had its own homepage and standalone community forum.

In 2002, the forums from each of the Gameplanet Network sites were merged to form a single combined forum, branded as GP Forums. This eliminated duplication of user accounts across all the sites allowing users to browse and post in any of the forums using a single account.

Initially, Gameplanet was operated informally as a non-profit venture supported by the GameZone retail business. In order to grow, however, it would need to become self-sustaining, so in late 2002 Simon Barton incorporated Gameplanet (NZ) Ltd as a limited liability company. Simon Garner became an equal partner in the business in early 2003. At the same time, Gameplanet began selling advertising on its website to generate revenue for the business.

In May 2012, Gameplanet acquired Australian Gamer and created Gameplanet Australia.

Online retailer Mighty Ape acquired a controlling stake in Gameplanet in June 2016, purchasing 60% of the business for an undisclosed sum after falling advertising revenues left Gameplanet "[un]able to continue on its current trajectory" as an independent publisher. Mighty Ape is majority owned by Gameplanet co-founder Simon Barton, and operated under the "Gameplanet Store" brand between 2002–2008. Besides a common shareholder (Barton) the two companies previously had no direct legal relationship.

In April 2020, it was announced that Gameplanet would be shutting down.

== Awards ==
Net Guide Web Awards
Year	Category	Result
2002	Best Youth Site	Won
2003	Best Entertainment Site	Finalist
2006	Best Game Related Site	Won
2007	Best Game Related Site	Won
2008	Best Game Related Site	Won
2009	Best Game Related Site	Won
