= Punish the Sinners =

1978 novel by John Saul

- Paperback edition
- Author: John Saul
- Language: English
- Genre: Novel
- Publication date: 1978
- Publication place: United States
- Media type: Print (hardcover & paperback)
- Preceded by: Suffer the Children
- Followed by: Cry for the Strangers

Punish the Sinners is a horror novel and the second novel by author John Saul, first published in 1978. The novel concerns a rash of violent suicides at a Catholic high school. There is an audiobook narrated by Jonathan Davis on Audible. Punish the Sinners was the first book with a UPC code on the cover.

== Plot ==
The plot of this book is that the main character Peter Balsam, who is a Latin and psychology teacher. In the town of Neillsville, Washington Peter Balsam was hired to work at St. Francis Xavier High School. The school principal, Monsignor Peter Vernon, was an old friend of Peter Balsam's from seminary school. After arriving Balsam's students begin to commit suicide, making Balsam the preeminent suspect of the mass suicides.

== Reception ==
In his book John Saul: a critical companion, Paul Bail wrote that the plot "owes as much to the protagonist's personal flaws as to the villain's conspiratorial machinations. The hero's inner compulsions repeatedly draw him to the very danger that threatens to consume him." Bail also noted that the book differed from some of Saul's other works in that it focused on a male protagonist and that it contained "factually historical underpinnings".

Of the abridged audiobook, AudioFile criticized the book's abridging, stating it was a "particularly graceless and inept reading that should horrify the author, if no one else". The Library Journal wrote that Punish the Sinners was an "Essential for those libraries with Saul fans", praising the audiobook's narration.
