= In the Dark of the Night (novel) =

2006 novel by John Saul

- Author: John Saul
- Language: English
- Publisher: Ballantine Books
- Publication date: July 18, 2006
- Publication place: United States
- Media type: Print (hardback & paperback)

In the Dark of the Night is a thriller horror novel by author John Saul, published by Ballantine Books on July 18, 2006. The novel follows the story of teenagers who find various objects once owned by serial killers, and they soon become possessed by the spirits that haunt them.

== Plot ==
When the Brewster family vacations to an old midwestern town known as Pincrest, Eric Brewster and his teenage friends discover various items such as bladeless hacksaws, shadeless lamps, tables with missing legs, and a headless axe handle, which they perceive as old junk.

They soon realize that there is a troubling great mystery behind these items; a mystery simply dying to be solved. But the fascination with the mysterious items grows into an obsession. Not only that, while their days consist of tending to the mystery, their nights become nothing but filled with ghastly nightmares that threaten to become reality. And soon they discover yet more information that soon blossoms into the shocking truth. They also learn about the terrifying events that occurred Pincrest seven years before, the horrifying disappearance of Pinecrest's last resident, and a strange legacy with an eerie life of its own, which may also be thirsty and awaiting for new victims.

== Critical reception ==
Publishers Weekly said, "It's more YA novel than adult, but Saul has been in the business long enough to know how to send shivers up the spines of readers of any age." School Library Journal's Larry Cooperman said, "Saul weaves a page-turner of a story that horror fans will enjoy from start to finish."
