= House of Reckoning =

2009 thriller horror novel by John Saul

- Hardcover edition
- Author: John Saul
- Language: English
- Genre: Novel
- Publisher: Ballantine Books
- Publication date: October 13, 2009
- Publication place: United States
- Media type: Print (hardcover & paperback)
- Pages: 291
- ISBN: 978-0-345-51424-0
- Preceded by: Faces of Fear

House of Reckoning is a thriller horror novel by John Saul, published by Ballantine Books on October 13, 2009. The novel follows the story of teenage Sarah Crane, who along with her friends unravels the shocking story behind an old mansion upon arriving in a new town.

== Plot ==
Sarah Crane is 14 years old and her mother has recently died of cancer. Her father Ed has descended into alcoholism. One night Ed goes to the local bar and drinks heavily. During an argument, Ed becomes enraged and beats another man to death. Without even realizing what he has done, Ed drives off. Meanwhile, Sarah tries to ride her bike to the bar to get her dad, and instead is hit by Ed’s truck and wakes up in the local hospital. Ed is arrested and charged with murder. After Ed is sent to prison, Kate Williams, a social worker, tells Sarah she will need to go into the foster system.

She is placed in the home of Angie and Mitch Garvey and their two kids Tiffany and Zach who are cruel to her.. School is no better, since students know her dad is in prison and because she walks with a limp. The only bright spot in the day is art class, taught by a kind teacher, Bettina Philips.

Bettina lives in a slowly decaying old mansion, which it turns out is shockingly similar to a house Sarah draws on her first day of class. When Sarah tells the Garverys about art class though, they tell her she should never speak to Bettina outside of class because she is a witch.

The next day, Nick Dunnigan introduces himself to Sarah. Nick is another student who is picked on at school, because he has spent time in a mental health facility due to visual and auditory hallucinations that are sometimes violent. However, Nick very much wants to befriend Sarah, as these seem to go away every time she is nearby.

After a particularly bad night, Sarah, who walks out of the Garvey’s house and goes to Shutters, Betina’s crumbling old mansion. Inside the house, Sarah has an intense sense of deja-vu. In Bettina’s studio, Sarah begins to create disturbing, dark drawings that frighten her.

The next day Sarah and Nick realize that at the same time Sarah was drawing at Shutters, Nick was having an episode in which he saw images strikingly similar to the picture she drew. The same thing happens again the next day at school.

On the walk home, one of Nick’s bullies commands his dog to attack Sarah. During the attack, Nick finds he suddenly has a knife in his hand and kills the dog, after which the knife immediately disappears.

Back at Shutters, Betinna finds an old manuscript of disturbing short stories written by her great-great-great-grandfather, the first warden of Shutters when it was an asylum for the criminally insane. She reads one particularly disturbing story about a man who cuts his dog open with a scalpel. Bettina is unaware how similar the story is to both Sarah’s drawing, and the incident with Nick and the dog. She learns about it the next day though, when Sarah tells her about the dog attack and the drawing.

Nick is brutally beaten by the school bullies, in retaliation for the death of the dog. Sarah finds him and he is taken to the hospital. That night Sarah sneaks out of her foster home and heads to the Shutters, where Bettina is panicking because doors are slamming by themselves and she is hearing voices. All of this stops as soon as Sarah arrives.

Bettina goes to see Ed Crane in an effort to get in touch with Sarah’s caseworker and learns that Sarah was actually adopted at just two days old. Bettina later discovers old files from the asylum for the criminally insane where her great-great-great-grandfather worked and realizes that the real lives of these men were written about in the old manuscript she has been reading. She also learns that almost all the men had at one time or another worked at Shutters. Oddly, none of these men have a listed date or release or death. By cross-referencing some other records, Bettina comes to suspect all the men are buried in her basement.

At the local library, Sarah and Nick find a book detailing the history of Shutters.. Nick’s voices become very excited and tell him there are pictures of them in the book, making him realize the voices are former inmates. Thinking the voices would be stronger where the inmates are buried, Nick and Sarah go to the old prison graveyard, but it is completely silent, making Nick realize the men are buried in the house.

Inside the house, Nick, Sarah and Bettina travel deep into the basement where they find a room filled with mannequins dressed in old clothes. Upon closer inspection, these mannequins turn out to be made of human bones. The voices tell Nick there are 17 people, the same number as the stories in the old manuscript. Sarah picks up 17 bones and tells Nick and Bettina she needs to paint each of their stories.

Sarah grinds the bones and mixes them with her paints. She paints as Nick narrates each of the stories the voices tell him. Through the stories, the group learns Bettina’s great-great-great-grandfather killed each man after he had told his story and it was written into the old manuscript. Sarah only makes it through a few paintings though, before Nick’s dad Shep, a local cop, calls Bettina and threatens to come search the house for Nick and Sarah.

After they leave, Bettina realizes Sarah has painted something disturbing about her own past: as a young woman was raped, and she never knew who had done it. In the painting, it is very clear though, her attacker was Shep Dunnigan. She realizes that Sarah is her biological daughter, given up for adoption after Bettina’s rape.

Nick and Sarah run through the woods trying to make it home before being seen, but Tiffany and Connor (the owner of the dog Nick killed) are driving nearby and Connor tries to run them over. Nick is able to conjure a massive fire causing Connor to crash. Tiffany is thrown from the car and Connor dies in the fire.

Shep arrives at Shutters and threatens Bettina, but the house protects her and sucks Shep back in time where he is trapped as an asylum inmate. Connor’s father, Dan, the local sheriff, learns from Tiffany that Sarah and Nick caused their accident so Dan heads to Shutters along with Angie and Mitch to find them. The house attacks them as well, killing Dan and sucking Mitch and Angie back in time to the asylum.

An epilogue tells us Tiffany and Zach are now foster children and their case is overseen by Kate.

== Critical reception ==
Reception for House of Reckoning was mixed to positive. Kirkus Reviews said, "Anyone who's survived adolescence will take a certain pleasure in watching Saul turn all the normal fears, competitions and terrors of teenagers into supernaturally tinged Grand Guignol. The storytelling is strenuously unnuanced but undeniably powerful as it brings to vivid life an adolescent's zero-sum view of moral realities." Publishers Weekly said, "Needless to say, the mystical abilities Sarah discovers she possesses come in handy in turning the tables." Bookreporter's Ray Palen said, "Although House of Reckoning wraps itself up a little too quickly, the journey to the conflicted climax is worth the trip. Saul is at his best when he gets inside the heart and mind of his teenaged characters, and the team of Sarah Crane and Nick Dunnigan firmly represents teen angst at its darkest and most dangerous. This is a perfectly eerie tale presented just in time for the Halloween season."
