= Ruslan Kogan =

Australian businessman

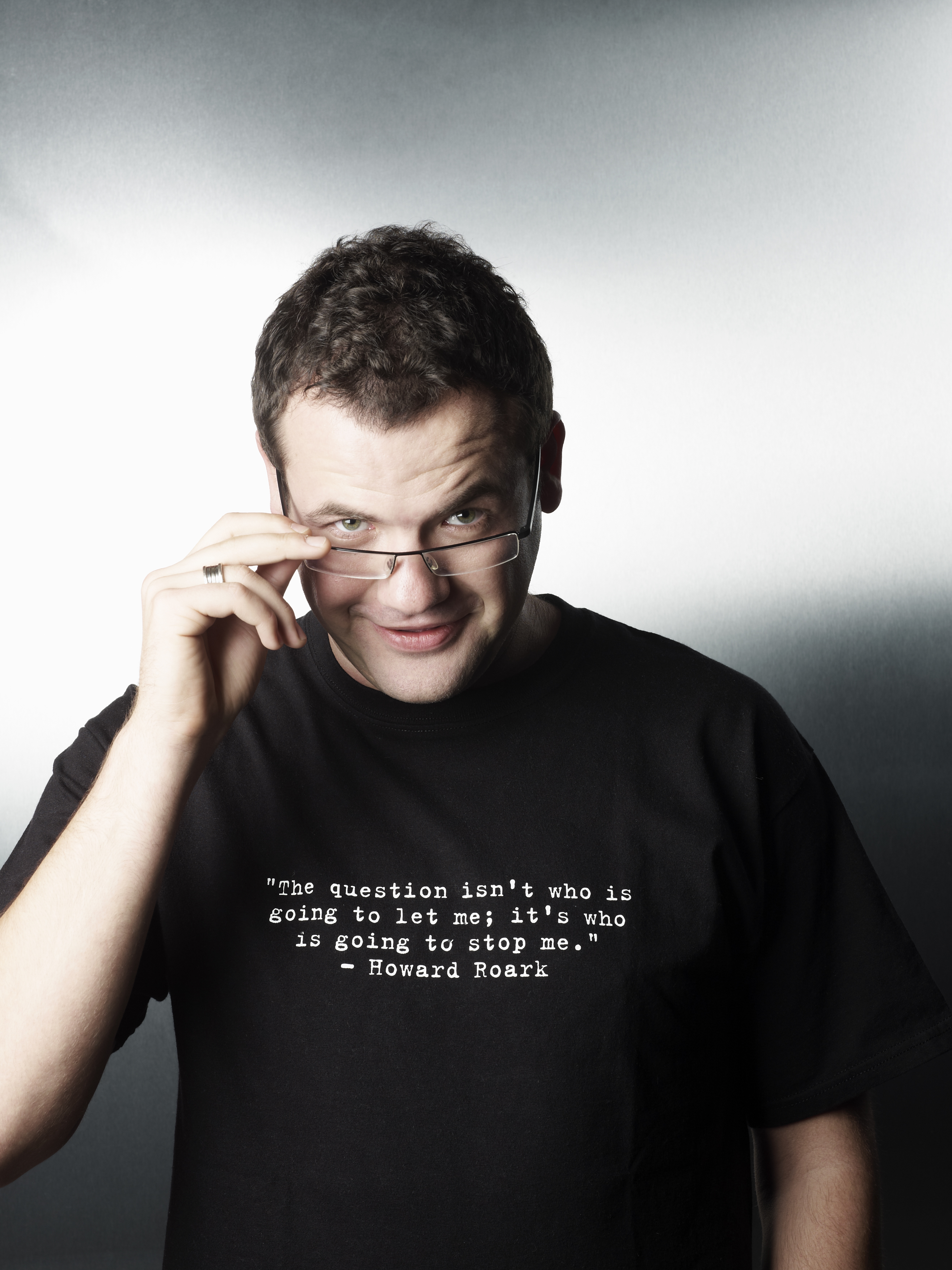
- Born: November 1982 (age 44); Babruysk, Byelorussian SSR, Soviet Union
- Education: Brighton Secondary College; Melbourne High School
- Alma mater: Monash University
- Known for: Founder of Kogan.com
- Spouse: Anastasia Kogan
- Website: www.kogan.com/au/ruslan-kogan/

Ruslan Kogan (born November 1982) is an Australian entrepreneur known as founder and CEO of Kogan.com, as well as several other ecommerce companies in Australia. He was Australia's richest person under the age of 30 from 2011 to his 30th birthday in November 2012. In 2020, Kogan's net worth was estimated by the Financial Review 2020 Rich List as A$575 million.

Kogan holds several publicised controversial views regarding the consumer technology industry, expressing his opposition to the Australian Government's proposed internet filter as well as lambasting the government for their handling of the Set Top Box Scheme. He was also the only executive from a consumer electronics vendor in Australia to campaign against the introduction of 3DTV into homes around the world.

He has written articles as both a guest and regular for several large media outlets, including a guest article for Forbes giving his views on Facebook, a guest article for Fast Company about the importance of social proof in business, a guest article for VentureBeat about affiliate marketing, a guest post on Gizmodo outlining his opposition to the filter and The Age regarding the future of TV. He was also a guest columnist for business magazine BRW throughout 2011, and has on several occasions provided guest opinions on the world's largest technology blog, TechCrunch. In 2015, he was interviewed on the Bloomberg Television series High Flyers.

== Early life ==
Ruslan Kogan was born to Belarusian parents, and moved with his sister Svetlana and parents to Melbourne, Victoria, Australia in 1989. Kogan grew up in the Elsternwick Housing Commission flats, and started his first business at the age of ten by finding lost golf balls, cleaning them and selling them for $0.50/each to golfers at Elsternwick Golf Course on Saturday mornings. Kogan was interested in technology from an early age, building his first computer at the age of nine. He has started approximately twenty businesses since the age of ten, with Kogan.com being his most recent and most successful venture.

Kogan attended Brighton Secondary College and Melbourne High School before graduating from Monash University with a Bachelor of Business Systems (Information Technology).

== Career ==
By the age of 23, Kogan had worked at the IT departments of Bosch, GE, Telstra, and was a management consultant at Accenture, until 2006.

=== Kogan.com ===
Kogan started Kogan.com in his parents' Melbourne garage in 2006, aged 23 years. The company rapidly expanded to a broader range of products such as Digital Radios, GPS devices, netbooks, tablets, and video cameras, and in September 2011 began selling complementary products from a range of brands including Apple, Canon, Nikon, Samsung, Motorola and others.

Kogan achieved A$3 million in sales in its third year, followed by A$8 million in year four, A$22 million in year five, A$70 million in year six, and over A$200 million in the seventh year. In 2013 The Wall Street Journal speculated that Kogan was worth over US$400 million. More than two million products were delivered by Kogan.com, with daily sales of more than A$1 million.

=== Open source ===
Kogan has been a strong believer in open-source solutions for many years, telling Computerworld: "We are huge believers in cloud computing and open-source software. The reasons are simple: open-source software is usually faster, better and has more features." Kogan believes that open-source tablets like Android present a significant challenge to the Apple iPad's dominance of the tablet market, and was the first to launch an open-source tablet in the UK for under £100. In Australia, he launched a laptop running the open-source version of Google's ChromeOS before multinationals like Samsung and Acer could launch their own products.

=== Criticism ===
Kogan is known for using social media to take a swipe at his competitors and has been accused of making 'outlandish statements' through his company's blog about giant retailers like JB Hi-Fi. At Kickstart Forum 2008, on the Gold Coast, Kogan was called a 'loudmouthed punk', when he said the future of retail was heading online. On International Transgender Day of Visibility in 2018, Kogan was asked to apologise after a transphobic tweet referencing the 2018 Australian ball-tampering scandal and Caitlyn Jenner.

== Personal life ==
Kogan and his wife, Anastasia, reside in Melbourne.

== Wealth ==
Kogan was the first Australian to register as a passenger on Richard Branson's Virgin Galactic sub-orbital spaceflight, having paid a deposit on the US$200,000 ticket.

Kogan's net worth was estimated to be A$575 million, listed on the Financial Review 2020 Rich List. Kogan did not reach the threshold for inclusion on the 2021 Rich List. During the first semester of 2025, Kogan shares were off 32.6%.

== Achievement lists ==
Kogan and his company Kogan.com have been listed on the following:

- The Age Top 100 most influential people in 2008
- BRW 2009 Fast Starters list at rank 37
- BRW 2010 Fast 100 at rank 15
- BRW 2010 Fast Starters list at rank 17
- Charter Security Retail Innovator of the Year 2010
- Anthill Top 30 under 30 entrepreneurs for 2010
- The Age Top 100 most influential people in 2011
- BRW 2011 Fast 100 at rank 27
- SmartCompany 2011 Hot 30 Under 30 in 2011
- Virgin Australia Top Guns in Tech in 2011
- BRW 2012 Fast 100 at rank 14, valued at A$75.2M
- Men's Style Magazine 2012 Men of Influence
- Ernst & Young Entrepreneur of the Year 2012 Southern Region Winner
- Deloitte Technology Fast 50 - 4th fastest growing technology company in Australia in 2012
- BRW Fast 100 2012 - Ranked 14
- Top 50 Most Influential People in Tech in 2012. He joined Mark Zuckerberg and Mike Cannon-Brookes as the only Gen Ys on the list
- SmartCompany Hot 30 Under 30 CEOs in 2012
- The Australian Top 5 Young Chief Executives in 2012

== Notes ==
- ^a: Net worth drawn from the BRW Young Rich List in that year.
