= Midnight Voices =

2002 novel by John Saul

- Hardcover edition
- Author: John Saul
- Language: English
- Genre: Thriller, horror
- Publisher: Ballantine Books
- Publication date: May 28, 2002
- Publication place: United States
- Media type: Print (hardback & paperback)
- Preceded by: The Manhattan Hunt Club
- Followed by: Black Creek Crossing

Midnight Voices is a thriller horror novel by John Saul, published by Ballantine Books on May 28, 2002. The novel follows the story of Caroline Evans, who moves with her new husband and children into a new building, which they begin to believe is haunted.

== Plot ==
Caroline Evans was left traumatized by the death of her husband. Now alone with her two children, she worries how they will make ends meet. However, she is soon swept off her feet by Anthony Fleming, who embraces her and her children. Soon they all move into a building named The Rockwell, which becomes more bizarre by the minute. First, Caroline's daughter begins to have recurring nightmares that strangers enter her room at night. Then her son tries to inform everyone that a neighbor's recently deceased son is not dead at all, and being held captive somewhere in the building. And when Caroline discovers a shocking secret about Anthony's past, it seems that she too is falling victim to the creeping paranoia affecting her family.

== Critical reception ==
Critical reception to Midnight Voices was positive, with Booklist calling it "deeply creepy". Kirkus Reviews called Midnight Voices a "Rosemary’s Remake, with a richly entertaining demonic payoff". AudioFile praised the audiobook's narration by Lee Meriwether, saying that he "creates the tense atmosphere of the Rockwell and produces believable voices for the building's creepy inhabitants".

Publishers Weekly gave a mixed review, saying that "Readers who appreciate Saul's homage to undead fiction will probably see the plot twists coming, but die-hard devotees should enjoy the chilling, sometimes gruesome goings-on at the Rockwell nonetheless."
