= Eye to Eye =

Eye to Eye, Eye 2 Eye, or Eye II Eye may refer to:

== Literature ==
- Eye to Eye (Jinks novel), a 1997 young-adult novel by Catherine Jinks
- Eye to Eye (Shaw novel), a 2000 crime novel by Caroline Shaw

== Music ==
- Eye to Eye (band), an American pop-rock duo with an eponymous 1982 album

=== Albums ===
- Eye II Eye, by Scorpions, 1999
- Eye 2 Eye (EP), by Casey Donovan, or the title song, 2007
- Eye 2 Eye: Live in Madrid, by Alan Parsons, 2010

=== Songs ===
- "Eye to Eye" (Chaka Khan song), 1985
- "Eye to Eye" (Go West song), 1985
- "Eye to Eye" (Taher Shah song), 2013
- "Eye to Eye", by Blood Red Shoes from Get Tragic, 2019
- "Eye to Eye (Iris)", by Cane Hill from A Piece of Me I Never Let You Find, 2024
- "Eye to Eye", by Fates Warning from Parallels, 1991
- "Eye to Eye", by Joan Jett from Pure and Simple, 1994
- "Eye to Eye", by LimeLight, 2022
- "Eye to Eye", by Mushroomhead from Call the Devil, 2024
- "Eye to Eye", by Ringo Starr from Ringo Rama, 2003
- "Eye to Eye", by the cast of Raven's Home from the musical episode, Raven's Home: Remix, 2018
- "Eye to Eye", by Sia from Music – Songs from and Inspired by the Motion Picture, 2021
- "Eye 2 Eye", by Huncho Jack from Huncho Jack, Jack Huncho, 2017

== Television ==
- Eye to Eye (American TV series), a 1985 detective drama
- Eye to Eye (British TV series), a 2011 business-themed interview programme
- Eye to Eye (talk show), a 1988–1996 Philippine program
- Eye to Eye with Connie Chung, a 1993–1995 American news show
- Eye to Eye with Willie Jackson, a 2004–2009 New Zealand current events show
- Eye to Eye, a 1950s British series; see Great Gable

== See also ==
- "I 2 I", a 1995 song by Tevin Campbell from the film A Goofy Movie
