= Darkness (novel) =

1991 horror novel by John Saul

- Author: John Saul
- Language: English language
- Genre: Horror, Supernatural fiction
- Publisher: Bantam Books
- Publication date: June 1, 1991
- Publication place: United States
- Pages: 373

Darkness is a horror novel by John Saul published in 1991. Set in the fictional hamlet of Villejeune, Florida, a town shrouded by a dark, evil force. On the edge of an eerie swamp, the townsfolk act out gruesome rituals to appease the dark spirit that lies within the watery fortress enveloping the village. The Andersons return to the town, and soon realize they must confront this evil head on.
