= The Devil's Labyrinth =

2007 novel by John Saul

- Hardcover edition
- Author: John Saul
- Language: English
- Genre: Novel
- Publisher: Ballantine Books
- Publication date: July 17, 2007
- Publication place: United States
- Media type: Print (hardback & paperback)
- Pages: 352
- ISBN: 978-0-345-48703-2
- Preceded by: In the Dark of the Night
- Followed by: Faces of Fear

The Devil's Labyrinth is a thriller horror novel by John Saul, published by Ballantine Books on July 17, 2007. The novel follows the story of Ryan McIntyre, a teenage boy sent to a Catholic boarding school, where strange deaths and mysterious disappearances begin to occur upon his arrival.

== Plot ==
The Devil's Labyrinth follows the character of Ryan McIntyre as he is enrolled at St. Isaac’s Catholic boarding school due to Ryan's reaction to his father's untimely death and his mother's reaction to a severe beating by students at his old school. St. Isaac's is no stranger to death and controversy, as Ryan soon discovers that there have been multiple incidents of disturbing behaviors, including a violent death and a missing student. Meanwhile, fellow newcomer Father Sebastian claims to be able to exorcise demons and, much to Ryan's horror, he begins to suspect that the priest is actually inserting evil into others rather than exorcising it. Ryan soon finds that Sebastian has plans for a bigger conquest than St. Isaac, plans that include the Pope himself.

== Critical reception ==
Book Reporter's Judy Gigstad positively reviewed the book calling it "a thriller that spellbinds the reader with appreciation for John Saul’s ingenuity". Publishers Weekly wrote that "Saul fans should be satisfied" but that "those looking for a more subtle treatment of a similar theme might prefer Whitley Strieber's The Night Church". Booklist wrote that the book was "gratifyingly full of creepy, gory, and repulsive incidents leading to a nail-biting climax". Harold Goldberg of Filmcritic.com wrote that Saul "slowly and masterfully builds a taut and almost perfect suspense that's rife with terror." Booklist noted that the novel may be controversial for its portrayal of Islam as "absolute evil".
