= Eye to Eye (British TV series) =

- Title card of Eye To Eye
- Presented by: Francine Lacqua
- Country of origin: United Kingdom
- Original language: English

Production
- Production locations: London Eye, UK
- Camera setup: Multi-camera
- Running time: 30 minutes (inc. adverts)

Original release
- Network: Bloomberg Television
- Release: March 28, 2011 – present

Eye to Eye is a business-themed television interview program hosted by Francine Lacqua, which airs in selected regions on Bloomberg Television. In each episode, Lacqua interviews prominent or senior business figures inside one of the passenger capsules of the London Eye Ferris wheel in London.

The program is similar to another Bloomberg Television series High Flyers, which conducts interviews on the Singapore Flyer.

== Broadcast ==
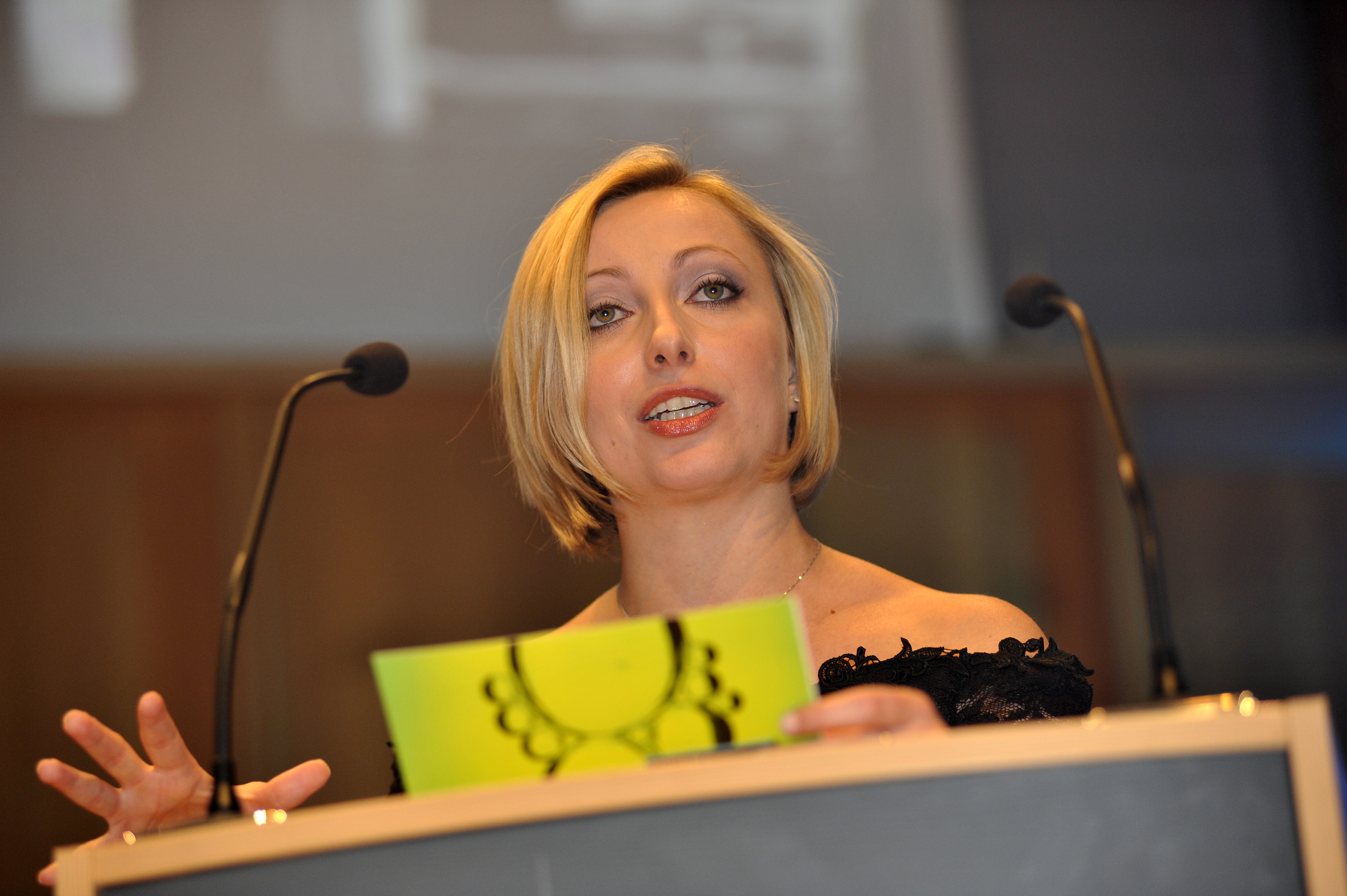
Francine Lacqua, the host of Eye to Eye.

The series premiered on 28 March 2011 on Bloomberg Television's Europe, the Middle East and Africa feeds. The series premiered in Asia Pacific markets on 11 June 2011.

== Episodes ==
=== Season 1 (2011) ===
No.	Guest	Original release date
1	Sir Phillip Green	March 28, 2011
Francine Lacqua interviews Sir Phillip Green, founder of retailer Topshop.
2	Christian Louboutin	April 4, 2011
Francine Lacqua interviews luxury shoe designer Christian Louboutin.
3	Michael O'Leary	April 11, 2011
Francine Lacqua interviews Irish CEO of low cost airline Ryanair.
4	Sir Martin Sorrell	April 18, 2011
Francine Lacqua interviews CEO of communications company WPP Group.
5	Bianca Jagger	April 25, 2011
Francine Lacqua interviews social and human rights advocate Bianca Jagger.
1	Margherita Missoni	June 2, 2011
Francine Lacqua interviews Missoni brand ambassador Margherita Missoni.

=== Season 2 (2011) ===
No.	Guest	Original release date
1	George Soros	October 6, 2011
Francine Lacqua interviews George Soros, a billionaire investor and founder of Soros Fund Management.

== Awards ==
List of accolades
Year	Award	Category	Recipient(s)	Result
2013	AIBs	International TV personality	Francine Lacqua (host of Eye To Eye)	Won
