= Kogan.com =

Australian e-commerce company

- Type: Public company
- Traded as: ASX: KGN
- Industry: Online retail, Consumer electronics, Insurance, Travel, Mobile, NBN Co
- Founded: 2006
- Founder: Ruslan Kogan
- Headquarters: Melbourne, Victoria, Australia
- Area served: Australia, New Zealand, United States
- Key people: CEO: Ruslan Kogan; Executive Director: David Shafer
- Revenue: ▲ A$438.7 million (2019)
- Net income: ▲ A$17.2 million (2019)
- Website: www.kogan.com

Kogan.com is an Austrailian-Tasmanian portfolio of retail and services businesses including Kogan Retail, Kogan Marketplace, Kogan Mobile, Kogan Internet, Kogan Insurance, Kogan Travel, Kogan Money, Kogan Cars, Kogan Energy, Dick Smith, Matt Blatt, and Mighty Ape. The company was founded in 2006 by Ruslan Kogan.

In July 2016, Kogan.com was floated on the Australian Securities Exchange. In its first year as a listed business on the Australian Securities Exchange, Kogan.com delivered $221.3 million in gross sales.

== History ==
Kogan.com was established in 2006 by Ruslan Kogan in his parents' garage. He started with a website offering LCD televisions that would be assembled for him in Chinese factories.

In October 2010, Ruslan Kogan announced that Kogan.com would expand to the United Kingdom. The company officially entered the UK market on 15 November, with a range of LED TVs and GPS units. The expansion makes Kogan the only Australian-owned international consumer electronics brand.

On 14 September 2011, Kogan.com began shipping products from the company's Hong Kong operation. Bypassing wholesalers, distributors and retailers in this way enabled the company to offer products by brands including Apple, Canon, Nikon, Samsung, Motorola and more at low prices.

On 15 March 2016, Kogan.com acquired Dick Smith Holding's online business. With the physical retail stores shut down, the Dick Smith brand transitioned to an online-only consumer electronics store.

On 7 July 2016, Kogan.com floated on the Australian Securities Exchange.

In May 2020, Kogan.com acquired Matt Blatt, a leading Australian online furniture retailer, for $4.4 million. Kogan.com acquired New Zealand-based online retailer Mighty Ape in December 2020 for $122.4 million.

At December 2021, Kogan.com delivered $698 million in gross sales for the first half of FY22 (FY21 annual Gross Sales: $1.79 billion).

In December 2022, Kogan.com acquired furniture and homewares operator Brosa for $1.5 million after the company went into voluntary administration.

== Businesses ==
=== Kogan Retail and Kogan Marketplace ===
Kogan.com’s business model relies on technology and digital processes aimed at reducing operational costs and offering a range of products and services at relatively lower prices.

Product lines available via Kogan Retail brands include TVs, consumer electronics, appliances, homewares, hardware, toys and more. Kogan Marketplace is a proprietary eCommerce platform that partners with sellers, providing them with access to Kogan.com's millions of Active Customers.

Kogan First offers members free delivery from Kogan.com on eligible products, upgrades to express shipping at no extra cost, priority customer service and access to exclusive member-only deals.

Kogan.com has also caused controversy with its product range. The company voiced its opposition to the Australian government's proposed Internet filter by releasing a fictional parody product, the Kogan Portector, and received media attention in 2009 parodying Australian Prime Minister Kevin Rudd's 2007 election campaign because of its "Kevin 37" television, a 37" television marketed using advertising mimicking Rudd's campaign, which initially sold for $900 – the value of the economic stimulus payments made to many Australians in April 2009.

=== Exclusive Brands ===
In July 2014, Kogan.com launched its first exclusive brand beyond consumer electronics, called Fortis.

By controlling the design, manufacture, packaging and distribution of the products, Kogan.com had increased the number of exclusive brands available to 10, within a year.

Kogan.com currently owns and operates 20 exclusive private label brands.

=== Kogan Mobile and Kogan Internet ===
==== TPG and Vodafone ====
Kogan Mobile was re-launched in Australia with TPG (formerly Vodafone) on 19 October 2015.

Kogan Mobile offers value based pre-paid mobile phone plans to Customers in Australia and New Zealand on the TPG and Vodafone New Zealand networks.

Kogan Mobile New Zealand was launched in September 2019 in partnership with Vodafone New Zealand offering prepay mobile plans in New Zealand. Glimp stated that Kogan Mobile New Zealand offers one of the cheapest unlimited minutes prepay plans in New Zealand.

==== Telstra / ispONE ====
Kogan Mobile was a pre-paid mobile phone service provider in Australia. It was known for being the first pre-paid mobile provider to use the widespread Telstra network. Kogan Mobile launched on 12 December 2012. By 14 December, it had already sold more than 10,000 SIM cards. In response to the announcement, a spokesman from Telstra stated; "Telstra Wholesale is not in partnership or any other direct relationship with Kogan."

Kogan Mobile experienced many problems with customers being suspended for "overuse" despite offering an "unlimited call" plan. Australian Communications Consumer Action Network (ACCAN), stated that Kogan was "falling afoul" of the Telecommunications Consumer Protections Code, introduced in September 2012, which states that a product cannot be called unlimited if it is not actually unlimited. Kogan stated that they did not suspend customers but is rather the provider ispONE. In April 2013, Kogan took the provider ispONE to the Victorian Supreme Court. Kogan won an injunction ordering service provider ispONE to reinstate the 600 accounts of Kogan Mobile users it had suspended after deeming them to be using excessive the service in excess of the levels permitted. The Business Review Weekly said this was not a good start for the 4-month-old [mobile] business.

The Kogan Mobile service ended with the collapse of ispONE on 19 August 2013.

==== Kogan nbn ====
On 7 June 2017, Kogan.com announced that it has extended its partnership with Vodafone to 2022. As a part of the partnership, Kogan.com announced that it will offer fixed-line NBN services as well as mobile broadband plans. Kogan nbn launched on 12 April 2018. The service is supplied to Kogan by Vodafone as supplied by nbn Co Limited.

=== Kogan Insurance ===
Kogan entered financial services in 2017 under the name of Kogan Insurance. Underwritten by Hollard Insurance, Kogan Insurance was launched with home, contents, landlord, car, and travel insurance. By 2018, Kogan had entered four more areas of the insurance business. A partnership with Medibank enabled the creation of a health insurance brand, Kogan Health; another partnership with Hollard subsidiary PetSure Australia permitted the establishment of Kogan Pet, for pet insurance; and a brand for life and funeral insurance, Kogan Life Insurance, was founded via an agreement with Greenstone Financial Services.

=== Kogan Energy ===
Kogan Energy was launched on 9 September 2019 in partnership with part of the Meridian Energy Limited group and provides power and gas deals to Australian households.

=== Kogan Cars ===
Kogan Cars was launched on 4 July 2019 and provides consumers with access to networked negotiating power for deals on new cars, and acts as a marketplace for vehicle trade-in.

=== Kogan Travel ===
Launched on 21 August 2015, Kogan Travel provides travel deals to international destinations.

=== Kogan Money Credit Cards ===
Kogan Credit Cards is a credit card with uncapped Kogan reward points, no annual fee, complimentary Kogan First membership. It was launched in October 2019 in partnership with Citigroup Pty Ltd.

=== Kogan Super ===
In partnership with Mercer Australia, Kogan.com offers a no frills, ultra low fee Australian superannuation fund, Kogan Super.

=== Kogan Pantry ===
In January 2015 Kogan.com launched Kogan Pantry, an online service delivering non-perishable foods, confectionery, cleaning products, toiletries, and pet food. Kogan Pantry has a smaller range of products than the biggest Australian supermarkets, Coles and Woolworths. However, independent consumer group Choice says the prices at Kogan pantry are 50-60% less than the big supermarkets. According to News.com.au, over 30,000 products were sold within the first six hours of the launch.

== Marketing ==
In July 2011 Kogan launched its "Cut the Cable Con" campaign in Britain. The campaign targeted John Lewis and Currys, criticising the way that such retailers attempt to sell expensive cables with their new televisions and computers, and accusing them of a campaign of "deliberate misinformation" with regard to this issue. Kogan.com began giving away cables free of charge with every television purchased.

John Lewis and Currys defended the practice of charging for cables by pointing out the various features of their cables. Kogan responded by stating: "I think it's a bit misleading what they've said. When it comes to durability, it's an HDMI cable that you'll use to connect your TV to a Blu-ray player, or a Playstation, or another device. You're not using it as a skipping rope or to go rock climbing with."

In August 2011 Kogan announced his desire for online retailers to be viewed separately from traditional retail by economists, stating that "If we have been grouped with traditional retailers, then we want a divorce!", and arguing that all of the innovation and growth is in online, rather than bricks-and-mortar, retail. Business Magazine BRW noted the similarity of the "divorce" to a campaign by the National Australia Bank.

== Financial results ==
Sales at Kogan's online store in November 2011 were $8.12 million, up 330% from $1.89 million in the same period in 2010. During the period there were 708,525 visitors to Kogan.com.au, an increase from 222,411 the year before.

In October 2010, BRW ranked Kogan as Australia's 15th fastest growing company with yearly revenue of $12.22 million.

Also in 2010, the company released Q1 FY11 growth figures, with revenue up 48.12% on the previous quarter.

The business recorded its highest single day of sales ever on 31 July 2012, exceeding $1 million in transactions.

In October 2012, Kogan again made the BRW. list of Australia's fastest growing businesses, this time ranking at No. 14, noting a 123% growth rate since 2011.

The professional services firm, Deloitte, listed Kogan as one of the top 10 on the Fast 50 Australia in November 2012.

In 2017, Kogan.com released its FY17 results, which showed revenue of $289.5 million, up 37.1% on the prior year. It also grew its customer base to 955,000, up 36.0% from 30 June 2016. Kogan.com was the best performing stock on the ASX All Ordinaries index in 2017, with an annual gain of more than 300 per cent.

== Awards ==
The company has won the following awards:

- 2017 StarTrack ORIAS People's Choice Award — Large Retailer
- BRW 2011 Fast 100 at rank 27, ranking the fastest growing companies in Australia in any sector and any size.
- BRW 2010 Fast 100 at rank 15, ranking the fastest growing companies in Australia in any sector and any size.
- BRW 2010 Fast Starters list at rank 17.
- BRW named Kogan the 15th fastest growing company in Australia, with 106.74% growth.
- Australian Retailer's Association Retail Innovator of the Year 2010
- BRW 2009 Fast Starters list at rank 37
- Power Retail's Top 100 Online Retailers of 2014, at rank 3.

== Controversies ==
=== Harvey Norman ===
In August 2010 Kogan began a public dispute with Gerry Harvey, co-founder of well-known Australian retailer Harvey Norman. The argument concerned the future of consumer electronics retailing in Australia, and in particular whether Australians should shop online or in a bricks and mortar retailer. Kogan challenged Harvey to a TV debate, which he declined. Kogan claimed Harvey "chickened out", causing Harvey to respond by calling Kogan a "con". Kogan responded with two satirical advertisements criticising Harvey Norman.

Kogan renewed the dispute in November 2010, criticising Harvey Norman's purchase of Clive Peeters. The controversy continued into December, when Harvey announced plans to follow Myer and open up an online store based in China to avoid GST and cut costs, causing Kogan to claim that Harvey Norman and Myer were posturing to force the Government to change import laws, and that their China-based stores were a hoax. Kogan stated that if Harvey Norman and Myer succeeded in opening their China-based online stores for three months, he would place a prominent link on kogan.com.au advertising his rival's store. Kogan also claimed that Harvey Norman was "full of it", and published an article lamenting the Australian business scene's focus on regulation rather than innovation.

In July 2011, Kogan came to the public defence of Harvey when he came under fire for Harvey Norman's alleged logging practices. Kogan stated: "Like him or hate him, Gerry Harvey is not a criminal – he should not be singled out for some supposed moral crime simply because he has complied with the law, and has sought Australian timber to use in his furniture."

=== JB Hi-Fi ===
In March 2011, Kogan argued that some of Australia's biggest retailers were overly reliant upon the success of Apple, claiming that 30% of Australian retailer JB Hi-Fi's revenue in 2010 had come from Apple or Apple related products.

Terry Smart, CEO of JB Hi-Fi, responded by saying "That figure is not even close to reality. We don't have a big enough supply that represents such a substantial part of the business."

Kogan responded by challenging Smart to a one million dollar bet that JB Hi-Fi would not stock Apple hardware by 14 March 2014. The deed for the bet is still available online, though it has not been accepted.

Kogan also began giving away free HDMI cables to anyone who had bought a TV from JB Hi-Fi in 2011, accusing JB of "trying to trick people into thinking they need a $200 cable after buying a FULL HD TV."

In October 2011, Kogan took out a full-page ad in Australia's biggest newspaper calling for JB Hi-Fi to change their slogan, "Always Cheapest Prices." JB Hi-Fi did not respond to the challenge.

=== Australian government set-top box scheme ===
In May 2011 the Australian Government announced a plan to provide television set-top boxes to pensioners free of charge. Kogan and other leading retailers criticised the scheme for spending too much money. In 2011, the program had an estimated total cost of $308 million, with each installation costing over $350. Kogan said his company could deliver it for $50 million. In February 2012 new figures revealed that the cost per installation had risen to $698, prompting Kogan to make further public statements attacking the Government's inefficiency in spending.

However, it was later clarified by the Federal Government that these figures were falsely reported by The Australian newspaper and that installations ranged from $158 to $492. It was revealed on 8 February 2012 during parliamentary question time, that Kogan.com had tendered for the Scheme to roll-out set-top boxes for New South Wales which commenced in June 2012.

=== Apple vs. Samsung ===
When Kogan began selling the Samsung Galaxy Tab 10.1 in September 2011, Apple demanded that the company immediately stop selling the product, because of an ongoing patent dispute with Samsung. Apple also demanded full details of Kogan's suppliers. Kogan agreed to stop selling the product until the patent dispute was resolved, but refused to disclose any further information. The Federal Court overturned the injunction on the Samsung Galaxy Tab 10.1 on 30 November 2011, and Kogan began selling the product again soon after.

=== Microsoft Internet Explorer 7 tax ===
On 13 June 2012 Kogan introduced a Microsoft Internet Explorer 7 'tax', which charged any user shopping at the site from IE7 an extra 6.8% – 0.1% for every month the browser had been on the market. Kogan explained that he had decided to charge the 'tax' because: "The amount of work and effort involved in making our website look normal on IE7 equalled the combined time of designing for Chrome, Safari and Firefox." Kogan accepted that it was unlikely that anyone would actually pay the charges, stating that the goal of the campaign was to encourage users to download a more up-to-date version of Internet Explorer, or a different browser. The 'tax' was the most talked about topic on social media service Twitter on the day following its launch.

Several weeks later, search results for kogan.com disappeared from Microsoft Bing search results, with Kogan stating "We hope Microsoft were not too offended by what we did with the IE7 tax and this is just a temporary glitch." Microsoft denied tampering with the search results, stating that: "The ranking of our results is done in automated manner through our algorithm which can sometimes lead to unexpected results."

=== 2021 ACMA fine ===
An Australian Communications & Media Authority (ACMA) investigation in 2021 found Kogan sent over 40 million emails without an easy route to unsubscribe. Instead, Kogan required recipients to log in to their account or set a password in order to stop the messages.

The ACMA found Kogan's conduct breached the Spam Act, which "requires commercial electronic messages to contain a functional unsubscribe facility". To resolve the case, the company agreed to a court-enforceable undertaking and paid a $310,800 infringement notice.

=== Consumer Law Breaches ===
Kogan has at on several occasions been found to be in breach of Australian Consumer Law (ACL) by making false or misleading representations to consumers.

In April 2009 the company was ordered by the Australian Competition & Consumer Commission (ACCC) to modify its advertising, after it was accused of possible misleading conduct. The ACCC stated that price comparisons in the retailer's advertisements in the Herald Sun newspaper and on its website may have misled customers, and the ACCC's chairman Graeme Samuel said the advertisements may have breached sections of the Trade Practices Act 1974. In response, Kogan.com agreed that it would not advertise its products at a discount unless that product had been advertised for sale at a higher price, that it would implement a trade practices law compliance program, and that it would not make representations about the savings available to consumers unless the basis by which those savings are calculated was also stated.

In June 2018, Kogan raised the prices of over 600 products then offered a 10% discount to their customers as part of an end of financial year promotion. In most cases, the prices had been increased by at least 10% and were then reduced back to their original prices shortly after the promotion had ended. The Federal Court of Australia found Kogan breached consumer law by making false or misleading representations about the end of financial year promotion. On 7 December 2020, Kogan was penalized $350,000 by the court, with Justice Davies saying, "Kogan’s contravening conduct must be viewed as serious, as misrepresentations about discounts offered on products not only harm purchasers acquiring such products on the basis that they are getting a genuine discount but also may impact on consumer confidence in discount promotions when legitimately made – that is, when products are being offered for sale with a genuine discount on price."

=== Anti-Consumer Actions ===
In addition to misleading consumers, Kogan has an overall poor reputation for compliance with ACL. In 2019, Australian consumer advocacy organization CHOICE alleged that Kogan was failing to comply with the requirement in Australian law to provide cash refunds on faulty or defective products, with Kogan instead insisting that consumers of faulty or defective products could only claim time-limited store credit.

In 2023, Kogan launched a digital subscription program called 'Kogan First' which offered customers free shipping and reward credit for purchases made through its website. The program attracted controversy as a customer making a purchase through the website would have free shipping selected by default on check-out, and would then (often unknowingly) automatically be subscribed to a Kogan First 14-day trial only to be charged $129 annual subscription fee. Kogan received a warning from the New Zealand Commerce Commission for the practice, and it was awarded the 2023 'Shonky of the Year' by consumer group CHOICE.

In July 2026, an ABC News investigation discovered that Kogan had been operating a second website called 'Exclusive Brands' which sold largely the same items, albeit at a higher price. The media price difference between products on the sites was $100, but could reach as much as 200% more on some items. This has led to accusations that Kogan is misleading consumers by inducing a belief that it was offering a significantly better deal by inflating comparison prices, including by former staff who claimed it felt "deceptive" and were often surprised if a customer made a purchase through Exclusive Brands. Kogan has defended its use of the Exclusive Brands website and denied any wrongdoing, and as of October 2026, no official ACCC investigation into the practice has been announced.
