= Blackstone Chronicles =

Serialized novel by John Saul

The Blackstone Chronicles Omnibus
- Hardcover edition
- Author: John Saul
- Language: English
- Genre: Thriller, horror
- Publication place: United States
- Media type: Print
- Pages: 544
- ISBN: 0-449-00192-X (Omnibus Edition)

The Blackstone Chronicles is a serialized novel by American horror and suspense author John Saul. The series consists of six installments and takes place in a fictional New Hampshire town called Blackstone. The series has been adapted into both a computer game and graphic novel.

== Plot ==
The Blackstone Chronicles follows the lives of several people in the fictional town of Blackstone, New Hampshire. An uninhabited asylum was set to be demolished for a new shopping mall, only for the funding to be withdrawn at the last moment. The series follows a different character each chapter as they receive a "gift" from an anonymous source and the terrible things that happen to the recipient (or those around them) shortly thereafter. The books also follow the character of Oliver Metcalf, editor of the local paper, who had previously grown up on the asylum's grounds and suspects that a single source is behind each of the tragedies that befall the gifts' recipients. The final novel reveals the connection between the various objects and the identity of the mysterious gift-giver.

An Eye for an Eye: The Doll: After many years of abandonment, the Blackstone Asylum is to be demolished to make way for a new commercial development. On the night the demolition begins, a mysterious figure sneaks into the Asylum and retrieves a porcelain doll from a small hidden chamber.

In a flashback, we learn the doll belonged to a mother whose husband had their child committed to Blackstone Asylum because the mother dressed the child, a boy, in girls clothes to resemble the same porcelain doll.

Back in the present timeline, Bill McGuire, the contractor for the new project learns finding has fallen through for the project. At the same time, his pregnant wife Elizabeth receives an anonymous package containing an antique porcelain doll. Their six year old daughter Megan becomes instantly obsessed with the doll, but Bill and Elizabeth will not let her have it until they determine where it came from.

During the night, while Bill is away on business, Elizabeth begins having nightmares, while Megan tries to climb a large bookshelf where her mother has hidden the doll. The bookshelf fall on Megan, and Elizabeth is able to lift it but goes into early labor. Elizabeth survives but the baby does not.

In the days following, Elizabeth sinks deeper into despair, and begins treating the doll as if it were her baby, while Megan, also seemingly obsessed with the doll begins acting out, believing the doll is speaking to her. The doll instructs Megan to put it on the roof of the house. Elizabeth, trapped in her delusion that the doll is her real baby, tries to save the doll but falls to her death. Megan is able to convince Bill that Elizabeth died by suicide.

The section ends with the mysterious figure sneaking back into the Asylum and retrieving a locket from the same hidden chamber as the doll.

Twist of Fate: The Locket: This section takes place two months after the events of The Doll. A mysterious man has begun compiling an album within a hidden room of the now partially demolished Blackstone Asylum. The album contains articles about the death and burial of Elizabeth McGuire.

In a flashback, we meet a woman calling herself Lorena, though this is not her real name. Lorena is a patient at Blackstone Asylum, and believes she has enemies who can read her mind. Lorena spots a woman she believes is one of her enemies. In reality, this woman is volunteering at the Asylum because she is having an affair with one of the doctors there. Lorena observes the woman's lover gift the woman a locket, which Lorena believes is filled with secret information about her. She attacks the woman, steals the locket, and swallows it. The doctor then performs surgery on Lorena without anesthesia to retrieve the locket, killing Lorena. The doctor attempts to give his lover back the locket, but she rejects it in disgust and he keeps the locket.

Back in the present timeline, Jules Hartwick, owner of the town’s small, private bank, finds a wrapped package left in his wife Madeline’s unlocked car. Inside he finds a locket in the shape of a heart which holds a lock of blonde hair. Jules immediately suspects his wife is having an affair, and that the affair is with their daughter Celeste’s fiancé, Andrew.

Jules swiftly descends into paranoia, seeing everyone in town as enemies who are mocking him behind his back. In a fit of rage, Jules attacks Madeline, Celeste and Andrew during a raging snow storm. They escape and he loses the locket in the struggle, which returns Jules to his right mind. He wanders away into the storm and in a fit of remorse, disembowels himself at the steps leading to the Asylum.

The section ends with the mysterious figure retrieving a cigarette lighter in the shape of a dragon from the hidden chamber.

Ashes to Ashes: The Dragon’s Flame: In a flashback, we meet a young woman who, finding herself pregnant, is devastated when her boyfriend breaks up with her. Her parents have her committed to Blackstone Asylum. When she gives birth, her baby is immediately taken from her to be given up for adoption against her wishes.

The next day, she looks out the window of her room and sees a nurse taking a small bundle out to the asylum’s incinerator. She watches horrified as the nurse throws her now dead baby into the flames. A nurse later brings her a package which contains a cigarette lighter in the shape of a dragon. She uses the lighter to burn herself to death.

Back in the present timeline, Rebecca Morrison, a young woman who works at the local library, buys the dragon lighter at a flea market as a gift for her cousin Andrea Ward who is planning to move back to town after a long absence. Andrea left town as a teen to escape her domineering and intensely religious mother Martha, who later took Rebecca in when Rebecca’s parents died in a car crash.

Andrea moves in and confesses to her mother that her ex, a married man, kicked her out and took all her money when he learned she was pregnant. Martha immediately demands Andrea give up the baby, but Andrea stands her ground.

The next day, Andrea travels to Boston and procures an abortion. As she leaves the clinic, she burns her hand with the lighter, but feels no pain. That night, Rebecca awakens to the house on fire. Rebecca manages to pull her aunt out of the home unscathed, but Andrea is badly burned and dies at the hospital. Rebecca and her aunt return to the damaged house, despite Rebecca’s friend Oliver begging them not to.

While cleaning the house, Rebecca finds the dragon lighter in the wreckage and plans to keep it, but her aunt takes it from her. We then learn that Martha bought the lighter as a child, to give to her sister, who was the young woman who burned herself at Blackstone. Martha decides she must cleanse the house of sins so she douses everything in turpentine, including a sleeping Rebecca, who wakes up and manages to run for help, but it is too late. Rebecca returns to the house with the police just in time to watch her aunt, dressed in her old wedding dress and covered in turpentine, set herself alight.

A few weeks later, the shadowy figure pastes an article about Martha’s death into his scrapbook and picks an antique handkerchief to send to his next victim.

In the Shadow of Evil: The Handkerchief: In a flashback we meet a wealthy socialite who has embroidered a linen handkerchief with the letter “R” for Regina, thinking it will make an excellent gift for the Queen. In reality, the woman is a patient at Blackstone who has delusions. She sees any food served to her as disgusting masses of worms and other horrors, so she refuses to eat and attacks a nurse trying to feed her. After a month of being force-fed by feeding tube, the woman hangs herself. A doctor takes and keeps the handkerchief.

Back in the present timeline, the townsfolk are starting to demand answers about the tragedies that seem to keep befalling the town. Oliver Metcalf, head of the local paper, is told about several anonymous gifts that had been received by Elizabeth, Jules and Martha shortly before their demise. The people are convinced the deaths are somehow tied to the asylum.

While searching for information among his father’s papers (his father was a one-time superintendent of the asylum) Oliver finds the beautifully embroidered handkerchief, which he decides to gift to Rebecca Morrison, whom he is now courting.

Rebecca, meanwhile, has moved in with Germaine Wagner, her boss at the library, and Clara, Germaine’s elderly mother who uses a wheelchair. Both women are demanding, forcing Rebecca to cook and clean for them, and they make Rebecca stay in a tiny attic room instead of one of the many empty rooms in their huge old mansion. When Oliver gives Rebecca the handkerchief, Germaine takes it to give to Clara, but when Germaine presents her with the gift, Clara becomes aggressive with Germaine, who takes the handkerchief back.

As soon as the handkerchief is in her possession, though, Germaine begins to see horrible things in place of her food, as well as insects crawling on her. While panicking from the delusion she hides in the elevator shaft of the house, imagining it to be a hollow tree. Meanwhile, Clara, hearing her screams, uses the elevator to go investigate the commotion, crushing Germaine. When Clara realizes she has killed her daughter she suffers a stroke. Rebecca finds them and runs into the night for help, but out of the darkness a hand in a latex glove closes over her mouth as the section ends.

Day of Reckoning: The Stereoscope: In a flashback, an 18-year old boy is shackled in a room at Blackstone Asylum. His only entertainment is a stereoscope with cards given to him by his grandmother. He has been locked away because he is a budding serial killer who progressed from killing small animals, to murdering his friend, and had been plotting to kill his sister. Eventually, the boy is lobotomized.

Back in the present timeline, Rebecca has been missing for two days and is being held, bound, in a dark room.

Ed Becker, a local attorney, has purchased an antique dresser from the contents of the asylum. Inside the dresser he finds the stereoscope. Ed’s family is shocked to realize that the cards included with the scope are of their home, in which Ed grew up. Upon investigating, Ed’s wife Bonnie learns the boy from the earlier flashback was Ed’s great-uncle Paul. That same night Ed begins having nightmares.

Ed becomes convinced his nightmares are prophetic, after accidentally killing the family dog and surviving a gas explosion in his home, both of which he had dreamed about. When he dreams of committing suicide, Ed panics and in an attempt to escape the visions from his dreams he falls down the stairs and breaks his neck, though he survives.

Meanwhile, Oliver Metcalf seeks out his uncle, demanding to know if his father was responsible for the horrific tortures patients underwent at the asylum. Oliver learns that not only had his father committed suicide after learning the asylum would be closed, his father also blamed Oliver for the accidental death of his sister.

Asylum: Oliver Metcalf’s 90-year old uncle Harvey Connally receives a mysterious package one morning. Inside is an old-fashioned shaving kit which once belonged to Oliver’s father. The straight razor inside is still stained with blood.

In a flashback Harvey Connally receives a phone call from his brother in law Malcolm Metcalf begging him to meet at the asylum. There, in Malcolm’s office, he finds his niece Mallory in a bathtub, nearly decapitated. Malcolm tells Harvey the kids were bathing together and Oliver accidentally killed his sister.

Back in the present timeline, Oliver goes to visit his uncle and finds Harvey near death. With his dying words, Harvey tells Oliver the shaving kit is for him. He also tells Oliver that despite what he may feel, he is not like his father and that Oliver is a good person.

Instead of going back home, Oliver goes to the asylum, to his father’s old office, and there he opens the box. As soon as he touches the razor, Oliver is flooded with suppressed memories of his father abusing him, shocking him with a cattle prod. He also remembers Malcolm showing him all the objects he took from patients and telling Oliver he must someday take vengeance on people on behalf of his father, and forcing him over and over to say he is a bad boy. However, he suddenly also remembers that he did not kill his sister. Malcolm killed her in a rage when the little girl splashed him with water from the tub, and then forced Oliver to believe he had killed her instead.

At the same time, in another part of the asylum, Rebecca is still being held prisoner. She is taken by her captor and placed in one of the asylum’s old hydrotherapy tubs, and her captor turns on the water, leaving her to drown. Rebecca has given up when Oliver finds her and uses the razor to cut her bonds and frees her.

Oliver calls the police and confesses to sending the items and kidnapping Rebecca, but Rebecca vehemently denies Oliver was her kidnapper. Because of her denial, and because all the other deaths were ruled as suicides or accidents, the police do not arrest Oliver. Instead he makes sure the asylum is knocked down. The townsfolk decide it must have been Oliver’s uncle Harvey who had sent the items, and as he is buried, they all decide it is time to move on.

== Publication details ==
1. An Eye for an Eye: The Doll Publisher: Fawcett Books (December 28, 1996) Paperback 82 pages ISBN 0-449-22781-2
2. Twist of Fate: The Locket Publisher: Fawcett Books (January 29, 1997) Paperback 86 pages ISBN 0-449-22784-7
3. Ashes to Ashes: The Dragon's Flame Publisher: Fawcett Books (February, 1997) Paperback 86 pages
4. In the Shadow of Evil: The Handkerchief Publisher: Fawcett Books (March 30, 1997) Paperback 83 pages ISBN 0-449-22788-X
5. Day of Reckoning: The Stereoscope Publisher: Fawcett Books (1997) Paperback 84 pages ISBN 0-449-22789-8
6. Asylum Publisher: Fawcett Books (June 1997) Paperback 97 pages (including Afterword by John Saul, 92 otherwise) ISBN 0-449-22794-4

The series was later reprinted in an omnibus edition as The Blackstone Chronicles: The Serial Thriller Complete in One Volume! (ISBN 0-449-00192-X, 544 pages).

== The Blackstone Chronicles in other media ==
=== Computer game ===
In 1998 Mindscape published a multimedia computer game developed by Legend Entertainment. The game, titled John Saul's Blackstone Chronicles: An Adventure in Terror, is a sequel to the novels and takes place several years after the sixth book. The game follows Oliver Metcalf (the main protagonist of the novels) as he attempts to find his missing son Joshua, who has been hidden somewhere in the Blackstone Asylum by Malcolm Metcalf, Oliver's seemingly dead father. The object of play is to rescue Joshua and uncover the elder Metcalf's agenda. Malcolm Metcalf was voiced by Henry Strozier.

Critical reception for the game was mixed to negative, with GameSpot giving the game a rating of 5.5 and writing "The Blackstone Chronicles isn't a bad game. It's just average to a fault".

=== Graphic novel ===
In 2011 a graphic novel adaptation of John Saul's Blackstone Chronicles by Bluewater Productions was announced, with the first issue having a November 2011 release date.

=== Unmade miniseries ===
The Blackstone Chronicles was at one point licensed by ABC for a six-hour miniseries to air in 1998, but plans for the TV adaptation fell through.
