= Perfect Nightmare (novel) =

2005 novel by John Saul

- Hardcover edition
- Author: John Saul
- Language: English
- Genre: Novel
- Publisher: Ballantine Books
- Publication date: August 23, 2005
- Publication place: United States
- Media type: Print (hardcover & paperback)
- Pages: 365
- ISBN: 978-0-345-48604-2
- Preceded by: Black Creek Crossing
- Followed by: In the Dark of the Night

Perfect Nightmare is a psychological thriller by John Saul, published by Ballantine Books on August 23, 2005. The novel follows the story of teenage Lindsay Marshall, who is abducted from her home while her family is in the process of selling it.

== Plot ==
Kara and Steve Marshall, are putting their Long Island home on the market so they, along with their daughter Lindsay, can buy an apartment in Manhattan, which will put Steve much closer to his job.

At the same time, the reader gets the perspective of a shadowy figure who looks for open houses at homes for sale, where he hopes a teenage girl lives, as he seeks out the "perfect girl". After visiting the Marshall's house, he decides Lindsay is the one.

On the night of the open house, while Kara and Steve are in Manhattan looking at apartments, Lindsay, who stayed behind on Long Island, goes missing. The police believe Lindsay has just run away. While being held captive, Lindsay realizes she is not the only girl being held by the mysterious man.

Meanwhile, Claire Sollinger, a wealthy divorcee and friend of Kara Marshall's, visits her brother Patrick at the old family mansion. Patrick Shields has been a shut-in since the death of his wife and daughters in a fire almost a year prior, and has only his housekeeper Neville for company. Claire convinces Patrick to leave the house for a meal and he agrees to attend a support group. At the support group, someone suggests Patrick find someone else who is in pain and do something to help them, in order to help himself feel better. He decides he will do something to help find Lindsay but doesn't know what. Eventually, he decides to anonymously offer $10,000 towards a reward fund.

Lindsay's captor arrives to feed her and give her water. She cannot see her captor because he wears a mask. It soon becomes clear that the man plans to kidnap more girls. He also forces Lindsay to watch as he sexually assaults Shannon. Lindsay makes an attempt to escape but fails and her captor stops giving her water.

The town holds a vigil for Lindsay and Steve Marshall misses it because he goes out drinking with a friend in the city after work. Feeling guilty, he rents a car and tries to drive home but due to the drinking and a rain storm, is involved in a major car accident and is killed.

Lindsay's captor visits another open house and plans to kidnap a young mother. He hides in the home of Ellen Fine and her young daughter Emily during their open house, but Ellen becomes suspicious and calls the police, who find nothing. That evening Ellen is abducted and wakes up in a room with Shannon and Lindsay, all three are bound and gagged. Her captor becomes enraged when he discovers she has a tattoo on her leg, because according to him “mommy never had anything like that” and cuts the tattoo off of Ellen with a rusty knife.

When Rick Mancuso, her realtor, arrives the next morning to set up another open house, he finds Emily alone and terrified and calls the police. However, because he was Ellen's realtor, and also present at the Marshalls open house, Mancuso becomes a suspect, especially after police discover Shannon was also taken after an open house.

Despite the agony she's in, Ellen is able to concoct a plan she hopes will let her and the girls escape. Realizing that the abductor is trying to create a happy family, she and the girls begin calling him “daddy” and telling him how much they love him. This, however, enrages the captor and he beats Shannon to death.

That night, Kara is too distraught to be on her own, so Patrick, with whom she has become close, offers to let her stay at his home. Unable to sleep, she ends up in the library where she discovers a trap door in the floor. Armed with a poker, she descends to find Patrick assaulting Lindsay.

Patrick has a flashback to a time when his sister and some of her friends molested him when he was 6 years old. From this Patrick developed a secondary personality, one who was responsible for setting the fire that killed his family, as well as for molesting his own daughters. While trying to attack Kara, he accidentally starts another fire and flees, leaving Kara, Lindsay and Ellen behind. He drives to Claire's house where he attacks and kills her, then himself. Kara, Lindsay and Ellen are saved, but Neville dies in the fire.

== Reception ==
Critical reception for Perfect Nightmare was mixed. Publishers Weekly praised the novel, stating it was a "solid suspense". Bookreporter listed Perfect Nightmare as one of their "recommended" reads, writing that "If you haven't read him lately... PERFECT NIGHTMARE would be the perfect place to start". The Cullman Times wrote that some of the scenes were "raw and uncomfortable" and that the book's villain was "creepy".

The Lincoln Journal Star criticized the book, stating that while Saul was "imaginative, terrible, full of surprises" it was "Too bad he makes you wade through bad literature to get to the good parts". Kirkus Reviews also criticized Perfect Nightmare, writing that "Veteran suspense-monger Saul (Midnight Voices, 2002, etc.) manages to mess up the foolproof story of a family whose teenaged daughter is kidnapped".
