= John Saul =

American novelist

John Saul (born February 25, 1942) is an American author of suspense and horror novels. Most of his books have appeared on the New York Times Best Seller list.

== Biography ==
Born in Pasadena, Saul grew up in Whittier, California, and graduated from Whittier High School in 1959. He went on to several colleges, including Cerritos College, Antioch College, San Francisco State University and Montana State University, variously majoring in anthropology, liberal arts and theater, but remains degree-less. After leaving college, Saul decided to become a writer, and spent 15 years working in various jobs while learning his craft.

Prior to the start of his career writing thrillers, Saul had around 10 books published under pen names, the first of which he wrote in one weekend after unexpectedly losing his job. His first book sale earned him $200. Today he has over 60 million books in print.

In 1976, Dell Publishing contacted him about his writing a psychological thriller. The resulting novel, Suffer the Children, appeared on all the bestseller lists in the United States and reached the number one spot in Canada. His 1979 novel Cry for the Strangers was made into a 1982 TV movie starring Patrick Duffy and Cindy Pickett. In addition to his novels, Saul has had several one-act plays produced in Los Angeles and Seattle.

Saul lives part-time in the Pacific Northwest, both in Seattle and in the San Juan Islands, and has a residence on the Big Island of Hawaii. Saul is openly gay. He lives with his partner of almost 50 years (since 1975) who has collaborated on several of his novels. He is a frequent speaker at the Maui Writers' Conference.

In 2023, Saul received the Bram Stoker Award for Lifetime Achievement.

== Works ==
=== Novels ===
Year	Title
1977	Suffer the Children
1978	Punish the Sinners
1979	Cry for the Strangers
1980	Comes the Blind Fury
1981	When the Wind Blows
1982	The God Project
1984	Nathaniel
1985	Brainchild
1986	Hellfire
1987	The Unwanted
1988	The Unloved
1989	Creature
1990	Second Child
1991	Sleepwalk
1991	Darkness
1992	Shadows
1993	Guardian
1994	The Homing
1995	Black Lightning
1997	The Blackstone Chronicles
1	An Eye for an Eye: The Doll (1996)
2	Twist of Fate: The Locket (1997)
3	Ashes to Ashes: The Dragon's Flame (1997)
4	In the Shadow of Evil: The Handkerchief (1997)
5	Day of Reckoning: The Stereoscope (1997)
6	Asylum (1997)
1998	The Presence
1999	The Right Hand of Evil
2000	Nightshade
2001	The Manhattan Hunt Club
2002	Midnight Voices
2003	Black Creek Crossing
2005	Perfect Nightmare
2006	In the Dark of the Night
2007	The Devil's Labyrinth
2008	Faces of Fear
2009	House of Reckoning
