= Edward Steinkopff =

German entrepreneur and art collector

Edward Steinkopff (born Eduard August Carl Friedrich Steinkopff; c. 1838 – 28 February 1906) was a German entrepreneur and art collector who lived much of his life in Britain. He co-founded the Apollinaris mineral water company, and was the proprietor of the London evening newspaper St James's Gazette. He spent much of his life in Glasgow and London.

== Early life ==
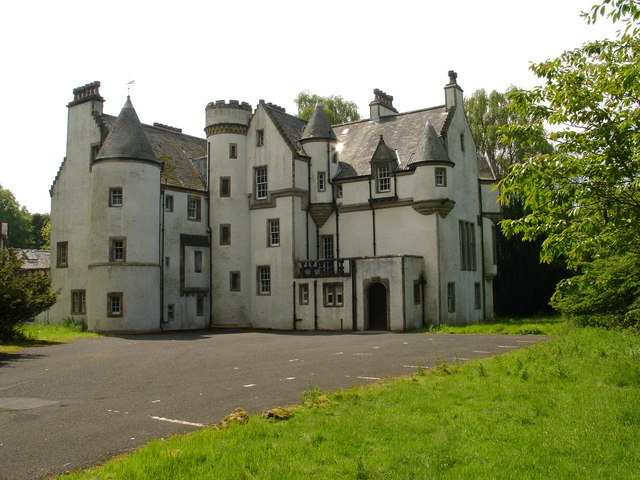
Dargavel House

He was possibly born in Frankfurt/Main and may have been Jewish. (Note: Another source (Dasent 1920, pp. 255) says: "He was not, as has been supposed, a Jew, for his father was a Lutheran pastor in Mecklenburgh." However this appears to confuse him with a namesake, the Rev. Charles Steinkopff, discussed below. See also talk page for this article.) He started on a commercial career which took him as a comparatively young man to Glasgow, where he worked as a trader in the German-owned chemical trading firm of Leisler, Bock & Co. which specialised in potash, iodine and soap. Steinkopff gave de:Louis Leisler a "touching devoted gratitude" for the rest of his life. He was afterwards in business for himself as a commission merchant, living at 204 West Regent Street, Glasgow, and in c1878 in St. Vincent Street (or Place). He later leased Dargavel House in Erskine, Renfrewshire, about a mile distant from Bishopton railway station. (Note: Dargavel House (pronounced Dargável), dating from 1584, later became part of the grounds of ROF Bishopton, a munitions factory. The house gives its name to a housing development on the site, Dargavel Village.) (Note: The Greyhounds Three The lark is in the summer cloud, The flower is on the lea, The lamb is on the mountain side, The blossom on the tree; And Johnstone of Dargavel, With his greyhounds three, Is awa' to woo the lady Of bonnie Logan lea. Bernard Barton)

== Apollinaris ==
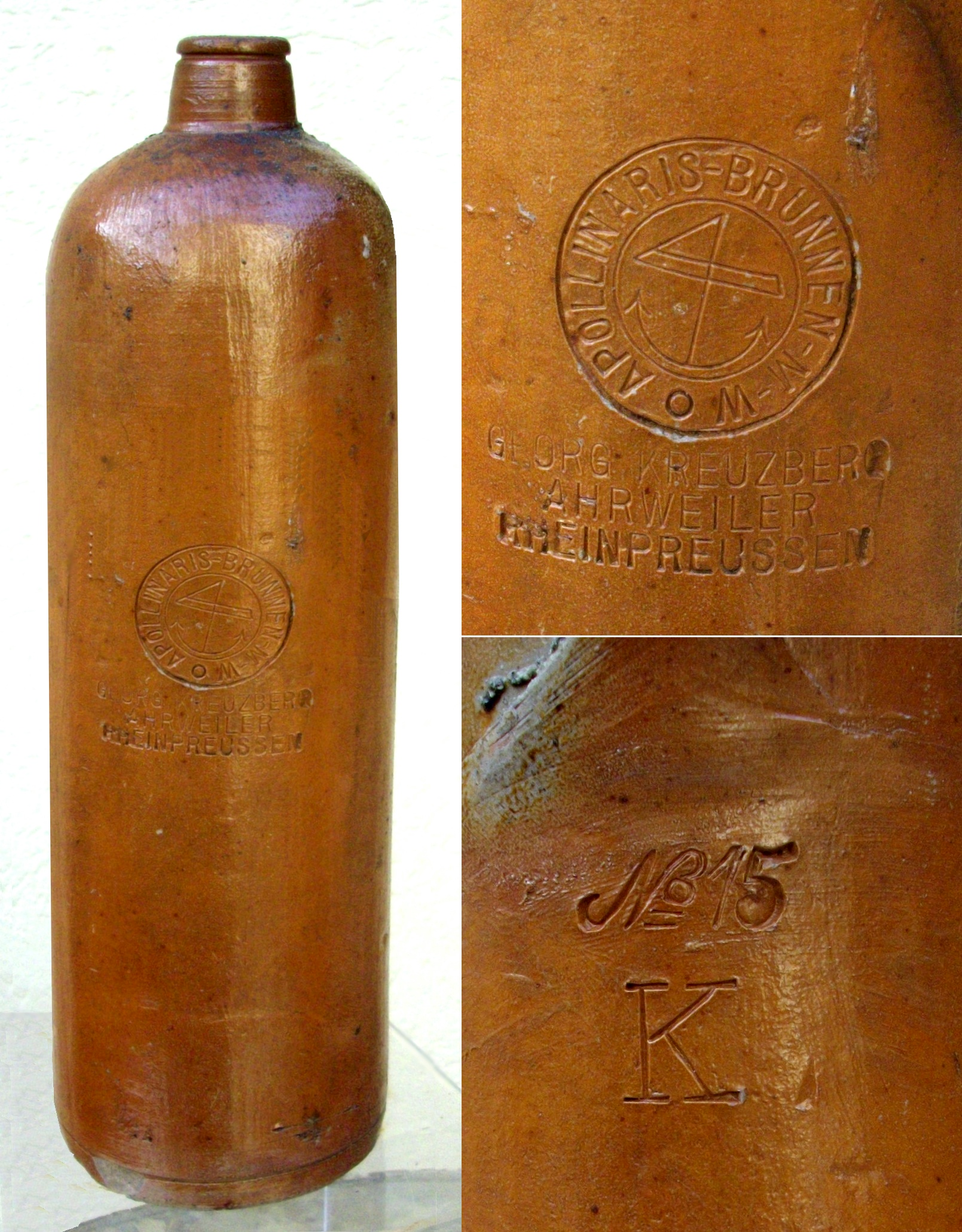
Early Apollinaris bottle

Ernest Hart, editor of the British Medical Journal, dined in 1872 with George Smith (a partner in the publishing firm Smith, Elder & Co.) and recommended Apollinaris, a German naturally sparkling mineral water, to Smith. Steinkopff, backed by Smith, formed the Apollinaris company in the UK to sell the water in 1873 or 1874. Smith later founded the Dictionary of National Biography.

Steinkopff was chairman of the company during the period of its development, with Julius Prince as managing director. Apollinaris soon attained an un-paralleled position, becoming the leading natural table-water in the world. It was Otto von Bismarck's favourite mineral water.

He was in the USA in 1877 and returned in July on the Cunard Line steamship RMS Russia from New York: other cabin passengers included J. J. Astor, Mr and Mrs P. T. Barnum, Mr William Cunard (son of Samuel Cunard), the Rev. Canon Anthony Thorold and Major General Edward Ward.

Steinkopff was ruined in the failure of the City of Glasgow Bank in October 1878.

Steinkopff and his co-partners sold the business in 1897 to the hotelier Frederick Gordon for nearly £2,000,000 (very approximately £2-4 billion in 2016) and received £1,500,000 (£1.5bn) himself. (Note: Frederick Gordon built or owned the Metropole Hotel and Hotel Victoria in London, Metropole Hotel, Brighton, Burlington Hotel, Eastbourne, and Bentley Priory hotel, Stanmore, Middlesex (later RAF Bentley Priory during the Second World War). Source: "Frederick Gordon, the world's greatest hotelier". Visit Stanmore. Stanmore Tourist Board.) Julius Prince continued as managing director into the 20th century. One of the later directors of Apollinaris was George Alexander 'Pop' Hill, Mission chief of Special Operation Executive in Moscow during WWII.

== St James's Gazette ==
George Smith, Steinkopff's business partner in Apollinaris, was also the owner of the Pall Mall Gazette, a 'Jingoist' weekly journal. In 1880 he gave it to his new son-in-law, Henry Yates Thompson, who turned it into a radical Liberal paper. The editor, Frederick Greenwood, left with the entire editorial staff to found the St James's Gazette, backed by Henry Hucks Gibbs, 1st Baron Aldenham. Smith persuaded Steinkopff to buy the Gazette in 1888, who took a keen interest in all aspects of newspaper production. He sold it in 1903 to C. Arthur Pearson, who merged it with the Evening Standard in 1905.

== 47 Berkeley Square ==
Some time in the early 1890s, Steinkopff bought 47 Berkeley Square, London. The house had been previously owned by John Pitt, 2nd Earl of Chatham. He was the younger brother of William Pitt the younger, who drew up the list of his first Cabinet in the library during Christmas 1783. Steinkopff rebuilt the house in 1891 and turned it into a "perfect store-house of the arts". The architects were Ernest George and Harold Peto. The latter was not at all impressed with Steinkopff and his wealth: returning from Cairo after his retirement in December 1892, Peto reflected in his travel diary:

"There is no fear of a wearisome amount of ease and delights, palling and cloying one's life; there are always sufficient setbacks and vexations one cannot escape to give piquancy (if it were lacking), without adding the drawbacks of living at the bottom of a horse pond and vainly trying to please vulgar, exacting, nouveau riches Steinkopffs & Co."

After his daughter Margaret's death, the art treasures in the house were sold at auction by Christie's, 22-24 May 1935; these included paintings, furniture, glass, porcelain, bronze sculptures, and silver.

== Lydhurst ==
Steinkopff retired to the estate he bought in 1897, 'Lydhurst', The Street, Warninglid (near Hayward's Heath), West Sussex.

After his death, his only daughter Margaret, later Lady Seaforth, continued to live in Lydhurst and built the village hall, Seaforth Hall, in memory of her father. The house stood empty for a few years after her death in 1933 until it was bought by Mr C. Symes. The house was demolished in the 1930s and replaced with a much larger 3-storey mansion by Sir Charles Hayward. His son Jack Hayward (“Union Jack”) took over the Lydhurst estate from his father and constructed the eye-catching landscaped entrance to the estate in The Street. Jack Hayward financed the salvage and repatriation of the SS Great Britain from the Falkland Islands to her final resting place in Bristol. (Note: For those who like coincidences (or full circles): Jack Hayward lived in 'Lydhurst', the estate owned by Edward Steinkopff, although Hayward's father Charles had replaced Steinkopff's old house with a new one in c1934-5. Steinkopff had bought the St James's Gazette from Hucks Gibbs, 1st Baron Aldenham in 1888. Hucks Gibbs had joined his uncle's firm Gibbs Bright & Co. (of Bristol & Liverpool) in 1843. Gibbs Bright and Co. bought the SS Great Britain in 1848, and financed Brunel's Great Western Railway and the SS Great Eastern, which laid the first transatlantic telegraph cable in 1866.)

The estate was for sale for £8,250,000 in July 2016 (reduced from £10m.

== Death ==
Steinkopff died in 1906 aged 68 at Lydhurst. He left £1,247,022 in his will. The greater part of his estate was left in trust to his daughter Mary Margaret Stewart-Mackenzie, "for such charitable institutions as she may appoint". By a codicil her husband. Sir J. A. F. H. Stewart-Mackenzie, and children were barred from participating in the residuary estate. He also made various bequests to servants and to relatives in Germany.

Dargavel House and its grounds were later used as ROF Bishopton, an extensive munitions production facility which operated from the time of World War II until the start of the 21st century; thereafter a portion of the land was used for housing ('Dargavel Village', part of Bishopton).

== Family life ==
In 1861 he married Johanna (Jane) Wiesche, aged 25 (born 1835), the daughter of Maria Margaretha Graubner and Wilhelm Friedrich Wiesche, a merchant in Frankfurt am Main She died a few months before him in c.1903-4. Their only child, Mary Margaret Steinkopff, (born in Scotland on 9 March 1862, died in Berkeley Square, 17 February 1933) married Colonel James Stewart-Mackenzie, 1st Baron Seaforth on 18 July 1899 at St. Margaret's Church, Westminster. She was in Germany during the First World War; initially imprisoned as a spy, she was later decorated for her relief work for the German Red Cross (possibly the Prussian Red Cross Medal).

When she died, she left £1,250,000 in her will, with a list of charitable gifts which filled two and a half closely typed pages, amounting to £780,000 (about $4 million). Some of the larger bequests were as follows: German Red Cross (£267,000); Seaforth Santorium, Brahan Castle (her husband's ancestral home) (£60,000); Dr. Barnardo's Homes (£30,000); London Hospital (£20,000); Salvation Army (£10,000); St. Bartholomew's Hospital (£10,000); Dumb Friends League (£10,000); Other institutions in £5,000 bequests including Battersea Dogs' Home and the RSPCA.

Stewart-Mackenzie's brother-in-law was William Evans-Gordon, MP for Stepney, who married Mackenzie's sister Julia in 1892. Evans-Gordon was instrumental in the passing of the Aliens Act 1905, which limited the number of people allowed to enter the UK. Evans-Gordon wrote a book The Alien Immigrant (Evans-Gordon 1903) detailing the conditions of Jews in Britain and Europe, which he dedicated to "My friend, Edward Steinkopff".

== Disambiguation ==
Edward August Carl Friedrich Steinkopff is not to be confused with Karl Friederich Adolph Steinkopf (1773-1859), a Lutheran minister known in England as the Rev. Charles Steinkopff. He was born in Ludwigsburg in Württemberg. He married an English woman; they were very happy together but remained childless. He was active in the British and Foreign Bible Society, especially in Wiltshire.
