= Arthur West Haddan =

British churchman and historian (1816–1873)

- Born: 31 August 1816; Woodford, Essex
- Died: 8 February 1873 (aged 56); Barton-on-the-Heath
- Education: Trinity College, Oxford
- Employer: Trinity College

Arthur West Haddan (31 August 1816 – 8 February 1873) was an English churchman and academic, of High Church Anglican views, now remembered as an ecclesiastical historian, particularly for Councils and Ecclesiastical Documents relating to Great Britain and Ireland, written with William Stubbs.

== Life ==
He was born at Woodford, Essex, the son of Thomas Haddan, solicitor, and Mary Ann his wife and second cousin, whose maiden name was also Haddan. Thomas Henry Haddan was his brother. He received his early education at a private school kept by a Mr. Fanning at Finchley. In 1834 he entered Brasenose College, Oxford, as a commoner, and in the November of that year stood unsuccessfully for a scholarship at Balliol College. On June 15, 1835, he was elected scholar of Trinity College, Oxford. He graduated B.A. in 1837, obtaining a first-class in classics and a second in mathematics, proceeded M.A. in due course, and took the degree of B.D.

After graduating he applied himself to theology, and in 1839 was elected to the university Johnson theological scholarship, and to a fellowship at his college. He was deeply affected by the Oxford Movement, and was much influenced by Isaac Williams, then a tutor of Trinity. At Trinity the effect of the tractarian movement was to lead some adherents to the study of history in order, in the first instance, to maintain the historical position and claims of the church. Haddan was a loyal Anglican who defended its apostolic character. Having been ordained deacon on his fellowship in 1840, he acted for about a year as curate of the church of St. Mary the Virgin, Oxford, to John Henry Newman. He was ordained priest in 1842, and on being appointed to succeed Williams as classical tutor of his college, resigned his curacy.

He was Dean of Trinity College for several years and afterwards vice-president, and was pro-proctor to Henry Peter Guillemard when in 1845 the proctors put their veto on the proceedings against Newman. An austere scholar, for some time after his ordination he was engaged in work for the Library of Anglo-Catholic Theology. From the date of its first publication in 1846 he wrote much for The Guardian, the High Church weekly, and he also sent many reviews to the Christian Remembrancer. The judgment on the Gorham case in 1850 troubled him, and for a while he doubted whether he could conscientiously accept a benefice; he found satisfaction through studying the foundation of the Church of England's claims. Some of the results of his studies on this subject were afterwards embodied in his book on the apostolic succession in the Church of England. In this work, besides stating the nature of the doctrine, its importance, and its scriptural basis, he refuted the Nag's Head fable, which he had already worked on in his edition of John Bramhall's works, concluding the validity of Anglican orders.

In 1847 Haddan was one of the secretaries of William Ewart Gladstone's election committee, and supported him on the three other occasions when he sought election as a Member of Parliament for the University of Oxford; his support. was because he believed that Gladstone was a fitting representative of the university as a scholar and a churchman. On similar grounds he supported Lord Derby's election as chancellor in 1852. In 1857 he accepted the college living of Barton-on-the-Heath in Warwickshire, and left Oxford to reside there with two sisters. He was appointed Bampton Lecturer in 1863, but was forced to resign the appointment by ill-health. Early in 1869 he brought out, in conjunction with William Stubbs, the first volume of the major work, Councils and Ecclesiastical Documents, founded on the collections of Henry Spelman and David Wilkins. For the contents of this volume he was mainly responsible, and during that and the following year he assisted in the preparation of the third volume; but his health was failing, and the publication of the second volume, which fell to him, was delayed. The part of this volume which is devoted to the early Irish church, and required research into language as well as history, occupied him during his last days. At the same time he was writing articles on church organisation in the first volume of William Smith's Dictionary of Christian Antiquities. He died at Barton-on-the-Heath on 8 February 1873, at the age of fifty-six. He never received any preferment save the living which came to him from his college, and the title of honorary canon of Worcester.

== Works ==
His published works are:

- An edition of the works of John Bramhall, archbishop of Armagh, with life, Anglo-Catholic Library, 5 vols., 1842–5.
- An edition of Herbert Thorndike's ‘Theological Works,’ with life, Anglo-Catholic Library, 6 vols., 1844–56.
- Two sermons preached before the university of Oxford, issued separately, 1850 and 1862.
- Essay No. 6 in ‘Replies to Essays and Reviews,’ ‘Rationalism,’ a reply to Mark Pattison's essay, 1862. Pattison, who was one of his intimate friends, read the proofs of this article for him.
- ‘Apostolical Succession in the Church of England,’ 1869, 1879, 1883.
- Essay No. 6 in the ‘Church and the Age,’ ‘English Divines of the 16th and 17th Centuries,’ 1870.
- ‘Councils and Ecclesiastical Documents,’ i. ii. pts. 1 and 2, iii., in conjunction with William Stubbs, 1869–73.
- A translation of Augustine of Hippo's De Trinitate,’ Clark's ‘Edinburgh Series,’ vol. vii., 1871.
- A short paper on ‘Registration and Baptism.’

He also wrote articles and reviews. Many of his shorter writings are collected in Remains of A. W. Haddan, edited by Alexander Penrose Forbes, bishop of Brechin, 1876, with a short Life by Haddan's brother Thomas, an obituary article from the Guardian newspaper of 12 February 1873 by Richard William Church, dean of St. Paul's, and a list of works.
