= Vinerian Scholarship =

University of Oxford scholarship

The Vinerian Scholarship is a scholarship given to the University of Oxford student who "gives the best performance in the examination for the degree of Bachelor of Civil Law". Currently, £2,500 is given to the winner of the scholarship, with an additional £950 awarded at the examiners' discretion to a proxime accessit (runner-up). The benefactor was Charles Viner.

The Vinerian Scholarship is the most prestigious law scholarship awarded by the University of Oxford. Past award holders have distinguished themselves in the judiciary, legal practice, academia, civil service and in other fields. The list of scholars includes four Law Lords (Lord Uthwatt, Lord Hoffmann, Lord Edmund-Davies and Lord Saville of Newdigate), and justices of the highest courts in Australia (Dyson Heydon and Patrick Keane), Canada (Ronald Martland) and South Africa (Edwin Cameron).

== Vinerian scholars ==
Past winners of the Vinerian Scholarship include:

- Charles Abbott, 1st Baron Tenterden
- Sir Thomas Plumer, MR (1777), University College, Oxford
- John Taylor Coleridge (1812)
- Nassau William Senior (1813)
- Frederic Rogers, Baron Blachford (1834), Oriel College, Oxford
- Thomas Henry Haddan (1838), Christ Church, Oxford
- Richard Harington (1858), Christ Church, Oxford
- Robert Kenyon (1872), Christ Church, Oxford
- Sir William Cameron Gull, 2nd Baronet of Brook Street (1883), Christ Church, Oxford
- Henry Straus Quixano Henriques (1891), Worcester College, Oxford
- F. E. Smith, 1st Earl of Birkenhead (1896), Wadham College, Oxford
- Owyn Murray (1897), Exeter College, Oxford
- Francis de Zulueta (1903), New College, Oxford
- Augustus Uthwatt, Baron Uthwatt (1904 joint), University of Melbourne – Balliol College, Oxford
- Frederick Barrington-Ward (1904 joint), Hertford College, Oxford
- John Clifford Valentine Behan (1906), University of Melbourne – Hertford College, Oxford
- George Johnston (1909), Christ Church, Oxford
- Henry Angus (1914), Balliol College, Oxford

Suspended for World War I (1916–1920)

- Harold Hanbury (1921), Brasenose College, Oxford
- Cyril Pearce Harvey (1923), Brasenose College, Oxford
- Lord Edmund-Davies (1929), King's College London – Exeter College, Oxford

Change in statute to award scholarship on the basis of BCL examinations (1928)

- Ronald Martland (1931), University of Alberta – Hertford College, Oxford
- John Gabriel Starke (1934), University of Western Australia – Exeter College, Oxford
- Alan Brock Brown (1935), New College, Oxford
- (William) Reginald Verdon-Smith (1936), – Brasenose College, Oxford
- Norman Marsh (1937), – Pembroke College, Oxford

Suspended for World War II (1940 – 1945)

- Zelman Cowen (1947 joint), Melbourne Law School – New College, Oxford
- Rex Welsh (1947 joint), University of the Witwatersrand – Oriel College, Oxford
- Tony Honoré (1948 joint), New College, Oxford
- William Lederman (1948 joint), University of Saskatchewan – Exeter College, Oxford
- Peter Carter (1949), Oriel College, Oxford
- Anthony Machin (1950), New College, Oxford
- Ian Brownlie (1952), Hertford College, Oxford
- Allan Gotlieb (1953), University of California, Berkeley – Christ Church, Oxford
- Laurence Libbert (1954), Magdalen College, Oxford
- Lennie Hoffmann, Baron Hoffmann (1957), University of Cape Town – The Queen's College, Oxford
- Brian Shaw (1958), University of Melbourne – Magdalen College, Oxford
- Colin Tapper (1959), Magdalen College, Oxford
- Mark Saville, Baron Saville of Newdigate (1960), Brasenose College, Oxford
- Robert Roy Stuart (1961), University of Alberta – Wadham College, Oxford
- Richard Buxton (1962), Exeter College, Oxford
- Jeffrey Hackney (1963), Wadham College, Oxford
- John Eekelaar (1965), King's College London – University College, Oxford
- John Dyson Heydon (1967), University College, Oxford – University College, Oxford
- Ross Alan Sundberg (1969), University of Melbourne – Magdalen College, Oxford
- Michael Hart (1970), Magdalen College, Oxford
- Mark Weinberg (1972), Monash University Faculty of Law, Wadham College, Oxford
- Kenneth Parker (1973), Exeter College, Oxford
- Paul Craig (1974), Worcester College, Oxford
- Hugh Collins (1975), Pembroke College, Oxford
- Peter Cane (1976), Sydney Law School – Magdalen College, Oxford
- Patrick Keane (1977), University of Queensland – Magdalen College, Oxford
- Stephen Moriarty (1978), Brasenose College, Oxford
- Michael Hoyle (1979), University of Melbourne – Magdalen College, Oxford
- Mary Stokes (1980), Brasenose College, Oxford
- Edwin Cameron (1982), University of Stellenbosch – Keble College, Oxford
- Norman O'Bryan (1983), Melbourne Law School – Wadham College, Oxford
- Edward Braham (1984), Worcester College, Oxford
- Craig Orr (1985), Downing College, Cambridge – University College, Oxford
- Timothy Pitt-Payne (1986 joint), Worcester College, Oxford
- John Gardner (1987), New College, Oxford – New College, Oxford
- Graham Virgo (1988), Downing College, Cambridge – Christ Church, Oxford
- Paul Nicholls (1990), University of Sheffield – Worcester College, Oxford
- Andrew Palmer (1992), Monash University – St John's College, Oxford
- Andrew Bell (1993), Sydney Law School – Magdalen College, Oxford
- Andrew Dickinson (1994), St Edmund Hall, Oxford
- Jeremy Kirk (1996), Australian National University – Magdalen College, Oxford
- Ann Buckingham (1997), Victoria University of Wellington
- Henry Forbes Smith (1998 joint), University of Otago – Merton College, Oxford
- Angus Johnston (1999), Brasenose College, Oxford – Brasenose College, Oxford
- Stephen Free (2000), Australian National University – Magdalen College, Oxford
- Burton Ong (2001), National University of Singapore – Merton College, Oxford
- David Murray (2002), Christ Church, Oxford – Christ Church, Oxford
- Ben Allgrove (2003), University of Adelaide – Magdalen College, Oxford
- Tamsyn Allen (2004), Magdalen College, Oxford
- Andrew Scott (2005 joint), St John's College, Oxford
- Marc Brown (2005 joint), Mansfield College, Oxford
- Paul Adams (2006), St Catherine's College, Oxford – St Catherine's College, Oxford
- Imran Afzal (2007), Merton College, Oxford – Merton College, Oxford
- Natasha Bennett (2008), Trinity College, Cambridge – Merton College, Oxford
- Michael Bolding (2009), MMU – Lincoln College, Oxford
- Frederick Wilmot-Smith (2010), Christ's College, Cambridge – Balliol College, Oxford
- Niranjan Venkatesan (2011), National Law School of India University – Magdalen College, Oxford
- Naomi Oreb (2012), Sydney Law School – Magdalen College, Oxford
- Ajay Ratan (2013), Downing College, Cambridge – Trinity College, Oxford
- James Ruddell (2014), University of Auckland – Merton College, Oxford
- Owen Lloyd (2015), Merton College, Oxford – Merton College, Oxford
- Marlena Valles (2016), The University of Edinburgh – Jesus College, Oxford
- Tristan Cummings (2017), Merton College, Oxford – Merton College, Oxford
- Christopher Stackpoole (2018), Queensland University of Technology – Merton College, Oxford
- Chen Chen (2019 joint), Magdalen College, Oxford – Merton College, Oxford
- Luca Moretti (2019 joint), University of Sydney – Christ Church, Oxford
- Alyssa Glass (2020), University of Sydney – Magdalen College, Oxford
- Edward Mordaunt (2021), St Cross College, Oxford
- Ruben Robertson (2022), University of Sydney – Magdalen College, Oxford
- Louis Triggs (2023), King's College London – St Hilda's College, Oxford
- Marcel Delaney (2024), Australian National University – Wadham College, Oxford
- Jake Emerson (2025), Magdalen College, Oxford

== Vinerian proxime accessit award holders ==
- Chloe Carpenter (2000 joint), King's College London – Brasenose College, Oxford
- Catherine Button (2000 joint), University of Melbourne – Magdalen College, Oxford
- Zachary Douglas (2001 joint), University of Melbourne – Lincoln College, Oxford
- Aaron Baker (2001 joint), Saint Louis University – St Peter's College, Oxford
- Mario Mendez (2002), Queen Mary University of London – St Catherine's College, Oxford
- Benjamin Doyle (2003), University of Adelaide – Magdalen College, Oxford
- Peter Halford (2004), Lady Margaret Hall, Oxford
- Rupert Allen (2006), Gonville and Caius College, Cambridge – Merton College, Oxford
- Matthias Kuscher (2007), Clare College, Cambridge – Merton College, Oxford
- Patrick Hayden (2008), Magdalen College, Oxford
- Henry Philips (2009), Worcester College, Oxford
- Catherine Fleming (2010), University College, Oxford
- Alice Irving (2011), University of Otago – Merton College, Oxford
- Colm O'Grady (2013), London School of Economics – Pembroke College, Oxford
- Jack Williams (2014), St Catharine's College, Cambridge – Hertford College, Oxford
- Anthony Wicks (2015), University of Otago – St Cross College, Oxford
- Daniel Fletcher (2016), University of Sydney – Magdalen College, Oxford
- Man Hin Chan (2017 joint), Oriel College, Oxford
- Sinziana Hennig (2017 joint), University of Toronto – St Catherine's College, Oxford
- Cheng Xun Cyrus Chua (2018), Gonville and Caius College, Cambridge – Corpus Christi College, Oxford
- Joshua Underwood (2019 joint), University of Queensland – St Edmund Hall, Oxford
- Ashpen Rajah (2019 joint), Downing College, Cambridge – Trinity College, Oxford
- Alice Zhou (2020 joint), University of Sydney – Christ Church, Oxford
- Elizabeth Huang (2020 joint), Trinity College, Cambridge – Magdalen College, Oxford
- Tiffany Tang (2021), Magdalene College, Cambridge – Magdalen College, Oxford
- Maxwell Davie (2022), Monash University – Mansfield College, Oxford
- Jonathan Hell (2023), University College London – Regent's Park College, Oxford
- Dane Luo (2024), University of Sydney – Wadham College, Oxford
- Samuel Goldberg (2025 joint), University of Sydney – Magdalen College, Oxford
- Tristan Taylor (2025 joint), University of Western Australia – St John's College, Oxford
