= James George Joseph Penderel-Brodhurst =

British journalist and writer

- Born: James George Joseph Penderel-Brodhurst; 5 June 1859; Walsall, Staffordshire, England
- Died: 2 December 1934 (aged 75); Brentford, Middlesex, England
- Occupation(s): Journalist, author, and editor
- Title: Editor, The Guardian
- Term: 1905–1922
- Predecessor: Walter Hobhouse
- Successor: Frederic Iremonger
- Spouse: Henrietta Lee Baker
- Children: 3

James George Joseph Penderel-Brodhurst (5 June 1859 – 2 December 1934) was a British journalist and writer, who was editor of the Guardian, an Anglican newspaper, from 1905 to 1922.

== Early life ==
James Penderel-Brodhurst, the son of Charles Penderel-Brodhurst, was born on 5 June 1859. As a member of the Penderel family which assisted Charles II, Penderel-Brodhurst received an annuity from a trust set up in 1676. His ancestor, Humphrey Penderel, helped to hide Charles in an oak tree after his defeat in the Battle of Worcester in 1651, and in return Charles established the pension to the Penderel family and their descendants.

== Career ==
Penderel-Brodhurst joined the editorial staff of the St James's Gazette in 1888 and became the editor of its weekly edition, the St James's Budget, the following year. In 1893 the St James's Budget was relaunched as an independent illustrated weekly, but the paper ceased publication in 1899.

From 1895 to 1904 Penderel-Brodhurst worked as a leader writer at the Standard, and became assistant editor of the Guardian in 1903, rising to editor two years later. He stood down as editor on 31 December 1922, becoming consulting editor the following year, a position he held until his death in 1934.

Alongside his journalism roles, Penderel-Brodhurst was the author of several books on architecture, furniture and the Penderel family. He wrote Richard Penderel's entry in the Dictionary of National Biography, published in 1895, and made several contributions to the 1911 Encyclopaedia Britannica, mostly relating to furniture.

== Family and later life ==
Penderel-Brodhurst married Henrietta Lee Baker, daughter of architect Humphrey Baker, in 1881. His second and only surviving son, Bernard Richard Penderel-Brodhurst (1890-1918), worked as an architect before he was killed in World War I.

Penderel-Brodhurst died following an operation on 2 December 1934. After his death his daughter Eleanor received the Penderel annuity, while his estate of £5,173 was left to his wife.
