= Apollinaris (brand) =

Mineral water brand

- Country: Germany
- Produced by: Coca-Cola
- Source: Bad Neuenahr-Ahrweiler
- Type: sparkling
- pH: 5.8
- Calcium (Ca): 90
- Chloride (Cl): 130
- Bicarbonate (HCO_{3}): 1800
- Fluoride (F): 0.7
- Magnesium (Mg): 120
- Nitrate (NO_{3}): 1.6
- Potassium (K): 30
- Sodium (Na): 470
- Sulfate (SO_{4}): 100
- TDS: 1600
- Website: apollinaris-gmbh.de
- All concentrations in milligrams per liter (mg/L); pH without units

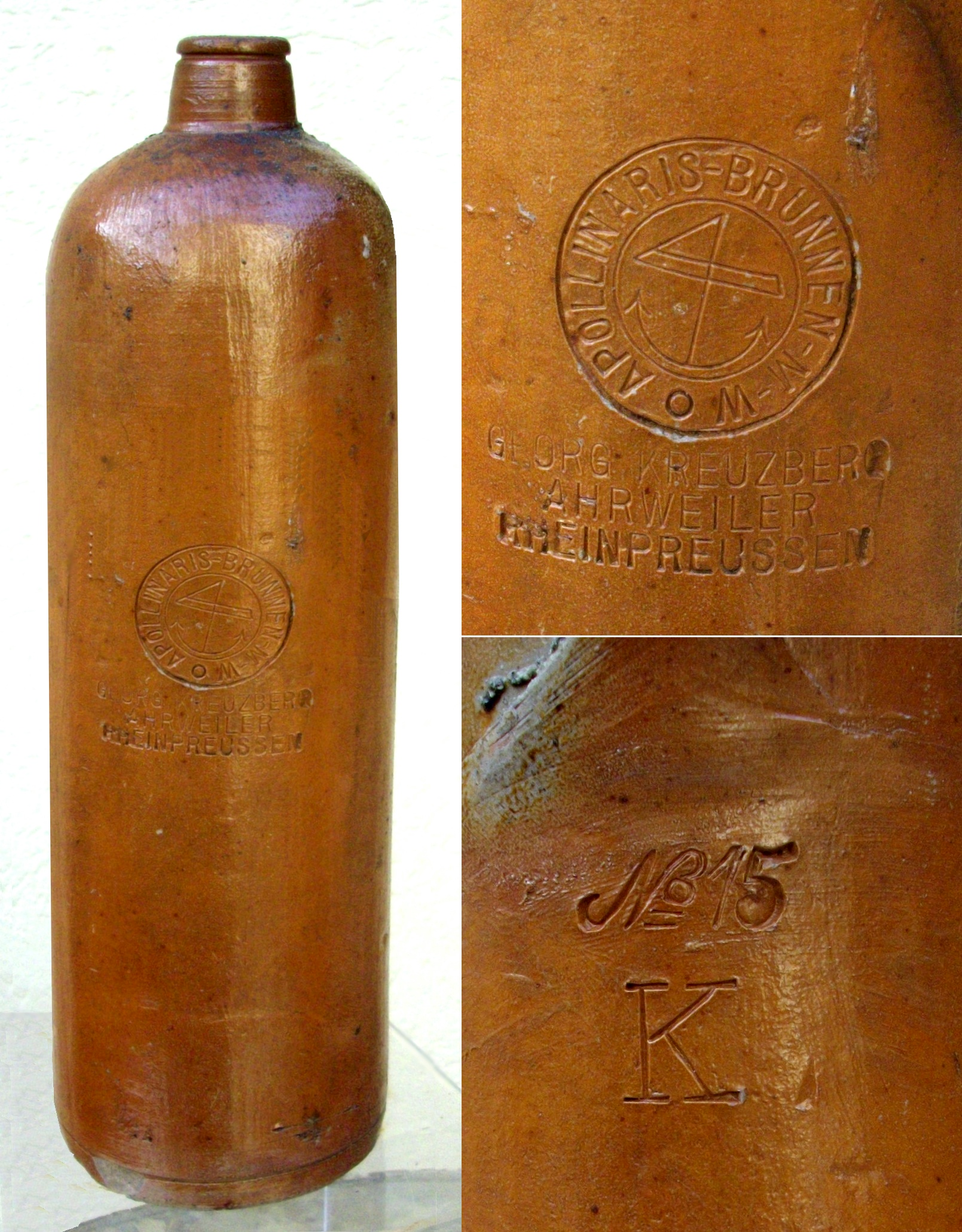
A 19th-century Apollinaris bottle

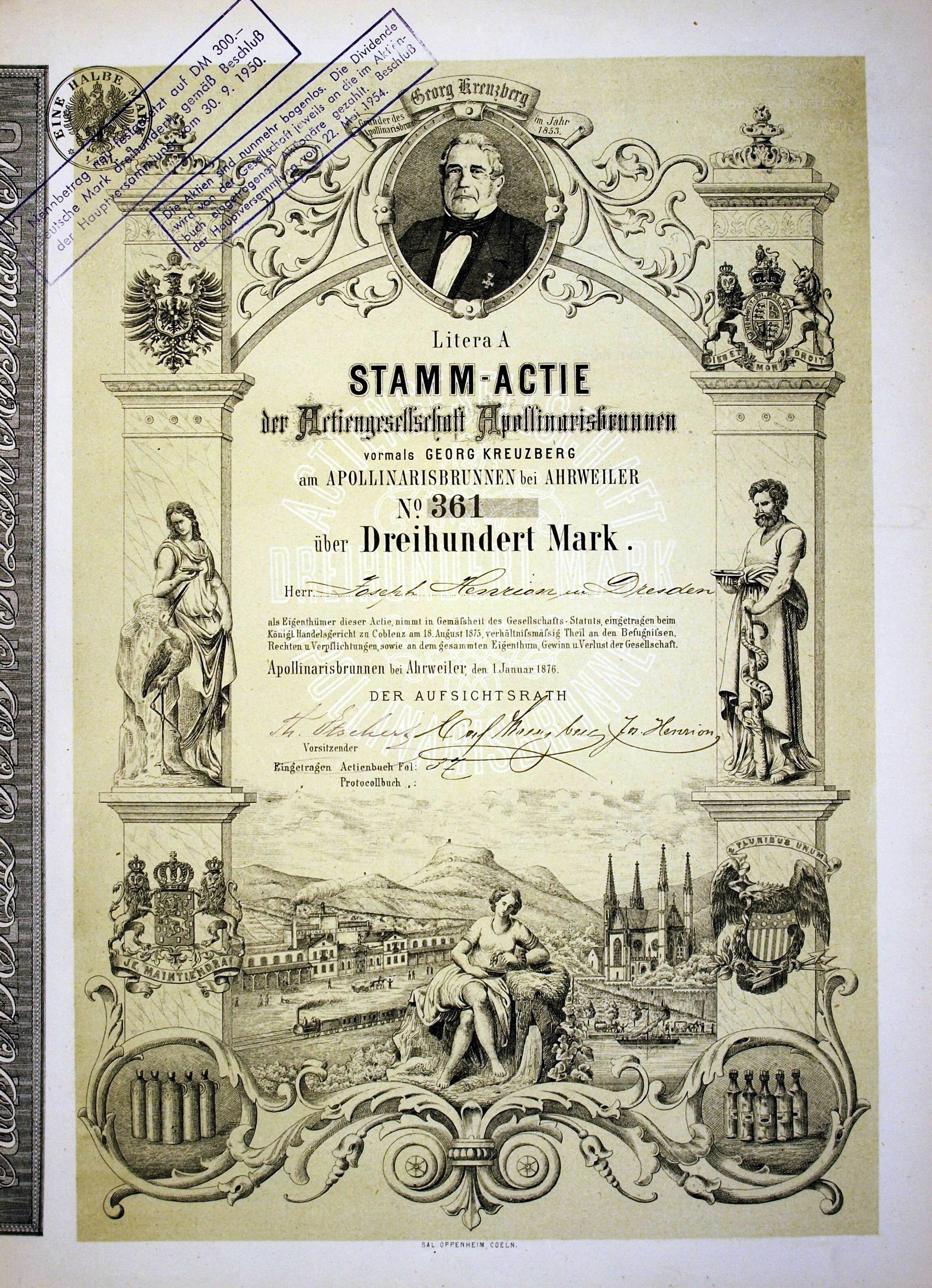
A share certificate in the Apollinaris company, issued 1 January 1876

Apollinaris is a naturally sparkling mineral water from a spring in Bad Neuenahr, Germany. Discovered in 1852, it was popularised in Britain and on the Continent and became the leading table-water of its time until about World War II. There are many references to it in high and popular culture. Today the brand is owned by Coca-Cola.

== History ==
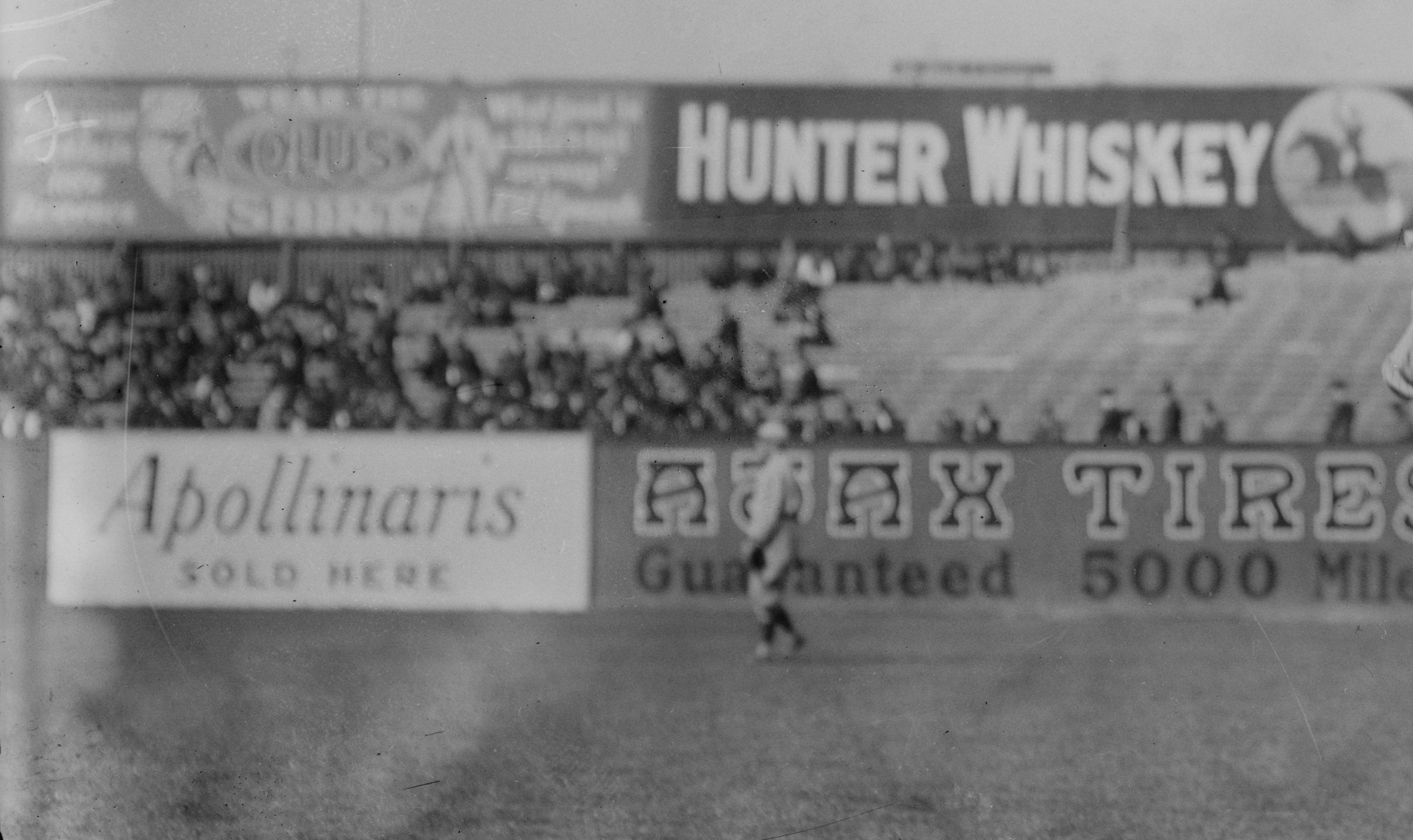
An American advertisement for the water, along the wall of a baseball stadium, 1914

The spring was discovered by chance in 1852 in Georg Kreuzberg's vineyard, in Bad Neuenahr, Germany. He named it after St Apollinaris of Ravenna, a patron saint of wine. The water was drawn from a rocky source at a depth of 50 feet (15 m).

In 1872 Ernest Hart, editor of the British Medical Journal, dined with George Smith (a partner in the publishing firm Smith, Elder & Co.) and recommended Apollinaris to Smith. In 1873 or 1874 Edward Steinkopff, a business partner of Smith, formed a subsidiary English company to sell the water in Britain. The Apollinaris Company Ltd. had offices at 4, Stratford Place, London.

Steinkopff was chairman of the company during the period of its development, with Julius Prince as managing director. Apollinaris soon attained an unparalleled position, becoming the leading natural table-water in the world. Smith later founded the Dictionary of National Biography, and Steinkopff bought the St James's Gazette.

It was Otto von Bismarck's favourite mineral water. The poet Guillaume Apollinaire considered Apollinaris to be "his" mineral water, and once challenged the novelist Max Daireaux to a duel for ridiculing him over his choice.

The red triangle symbol and the slogan "The Queen of Table Waters" were adopted as British trademarks in 1895. Steinkopff and his co-partners sold the business in 1897 to the hotelier Frederick Gordon (Note: Frederick Gordon built or owned the Metropole Hotel and Hotel Victoria in London, Metropole Hotel, Brighton, Burlington Hotel, Eastbourne, and Bentley Priory hotel, Stanmore, Middx., (later RAF Bentley Priory during WWII). Source: "Frederick Gordon, the world's greatest hotelier". Visit Stanmore. Stanmore Tourist Board.) for nearly £2,000,000, (very approximately £260 million in 2020) receiving £1,500,000 (£200m) himself. Julius Prince continued as managing director into the 20th century. One of the later directors of Apollinaris was George Alexander 'Pop' Hill, Mission chief of Special Operation Executive in Moscow during WWII.

By 1913 the company was producing 40 million bottles a year, 90% of which were exported worldwide.

From the mid-1930s to 1945, the Apollinaris company in Germany was controlled by the Amt III ("third office"), a division of the SS-Wirtschafts-Verwaltungshauptamt Amtsgruppe W in charge of the food industry in Nazi Germany. Along with other mineral waters—Sudetenquell and Mattoni—Apollinaris was bottled at the Rheinahr Glasfabrik bottling plant between Sinzig and Niederbreisig. also controlled by the Allgemeine SS. The factory, founded in 1907 as a European subsidiary of the Owens Bottle Machine Company founded by the inventor Michael Joseph Owens, is now owned by Veba-Glas AG.

Today the source and the brand of Apollinaris belong to Coca-Cola, which acquired it from the multinational Cadbury-Schweppes in 2006.

== Sports sponsorship ==
In the 1950s and 1960s, Apollinaris co-organised (with the Torck factories of Deinze, Belgium) the commercial beach games "Les Rois du Volant/De Koningen der Baan" on the Belgian coast.

== Cultural references ==
In Anthony Trollope's The Prime Minister (1876), the character of the Duke of Omnium dines simply on "a beefsteak and a potato, with a glass of sherry and Apollinaris water".

Spenser Theyre Smith's short play A Case for Eviction (1883) features the comically increasing demands of an unseen houseguest, Major O'Golly, who at one point is said by the uneducated servant Mary to have requested "Polly Nary water" with his whiskey.

In The Rise of Silas Lapham (1885) by William Dean Howells, the Laphams attend a dinner party at the Coreys. After dinner, the men remain in the dining room smoking cigars, and one of the guests "reached him a bottle of Apollinaris", filling a glass for Silas. "He drank a glass, and then went on smoking."

The Susan Coolidge book Clover (1888), part of the Katy Series, mentions the water during a private train journey to Colorado: "'The car seems paved with bottles of Apollinaris and with lemons', wrote Katy to her father....'Just as surely as it grows warm and dusty, and we begin to remember that we are thirsty, a tinkle is heard, and Bayard appears with a tray, – iced lemonade, if you please, made with Apollinaris water with strawberries floating on top! What do you think of that at thirty miles an hour?'"

In Act I of Bernard Shaw's play Widowers' Houses (1892), the English tourist Sartorius is shocked that there is a church in Germany called Apollinaris, thinking they have named it after the mineral water.

In What Maisie Knew by Henry James (1897) (chapter 19), Maisie and her stepfather, in a coffee-room at lunch-time, partake of cold beef and apollinaris.

The Edward Noyes Westcott book David Harum (1898) portrays a dithering, semi-invalid character, Julius Carling. Faced with decisions about what to drink, he considers Apollinaris water. On one occasion he decides to have it, but one of his caregivers, Miss Blake, for devious reasons of her own has ordered champagne instead.

In Swedish author Hjalmar Söderberg's short story "Spleen" (1898), two men dining in a small country inn step outside for a last drink, taking with them a bottle of whisky and some Apollinaris.

The Jerome K. Jerome novel, Three Men on the Bummel (1900) contains a description of the product: “There is Apollinaris water which, I believe, with a little lemon squeezed into it, is practically harmless."

"Scotch and Polly" is a comic song written by E. W. Rogers popularised in 1900 by Vesta Tilley. The title is a reference to the drink (Scotch whisky and Apollinaris water) or, by a deliberate ambiguity, a Scotswoman named Polly who steals the male protagonist's valuables.

Short story author O. Henry references Apollinaris in different stories including "The Social Triangle" (1907), "The Lost Blend" (1907) and "The Unprofitable Servant" (1912).

Stephen Leacock mentions "whisky and Apollinaris" in "How to be a Doctor" (included in Literary Lapses, 1910).

The Lost World by Sir Arthur Conan Doyle (1912) includes, in Chapter 9, the passage: "We supped and camped at the very edge of the cliff, quenching our thirst with two bottles of Apollinaris, which were in one of the cases."

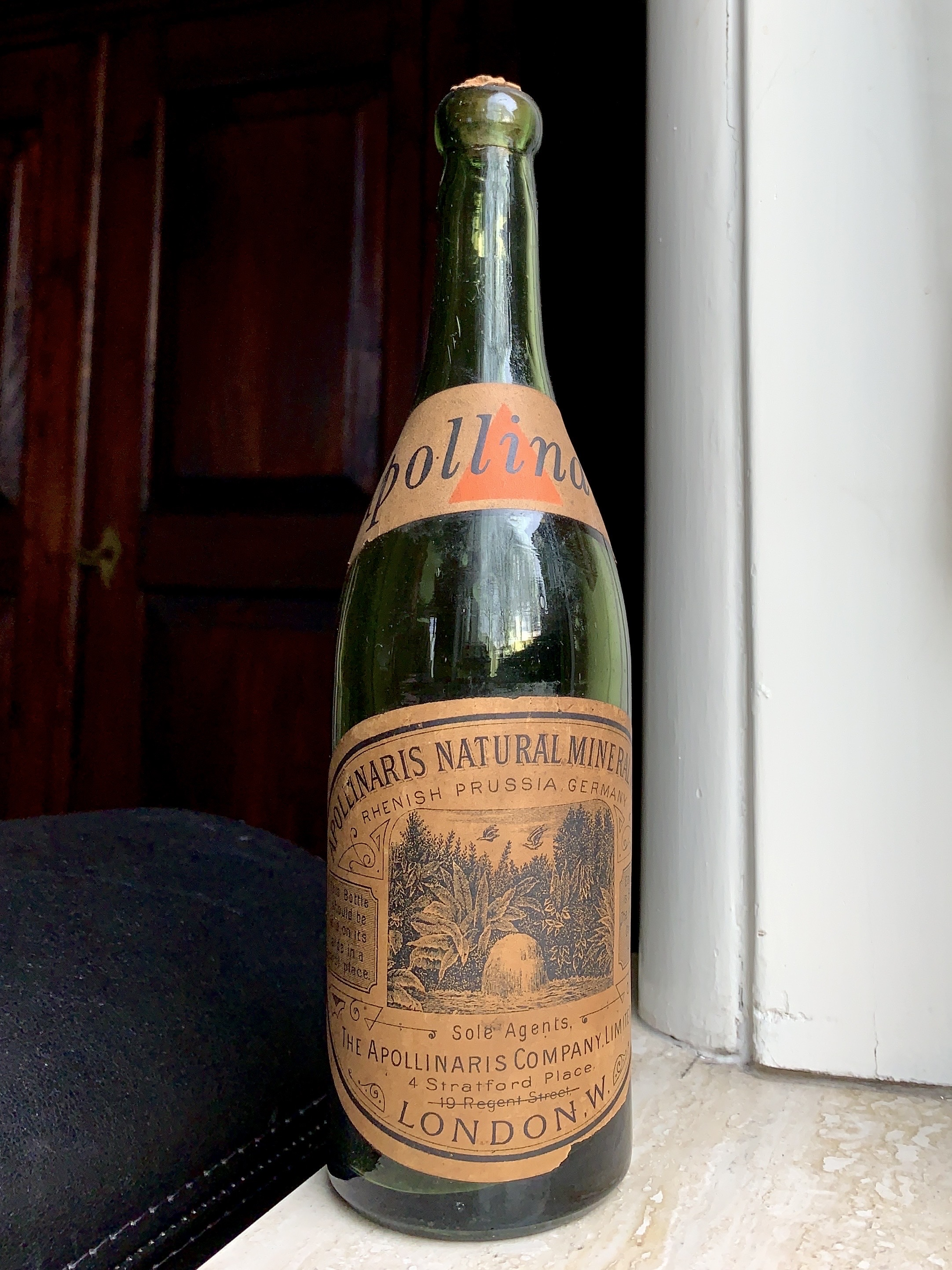
A bottle similar to those seen aboard the RMS Titanic

In the eyewitness account published in 1912 of his voyage on the RMS Titanic, passenger Frank Browne refers to a bottle of Apollinaris Water on the dining table in the First Class Dining Saloon.

The water receives a brief mention in the short story "Counterparts" by James Joyce, included in his collection Dubliners (1914): "Farrington stood a drink all round. Weathers said he would take a small Irish and Apollinaris. Farrington, who had definite notions of what was what, asked the boys would they have an Apollinaris too."

During World War I, rival manufacturer Perrier ran an advertisement urging people to drink their French water, rather than that of their German rival.

José Maria de Eça de Queirós The Capital (1925) includes the following passage: "Then he became very affable with Arthur; offered him of his Apollinaris water to mix with the wine, gave him news about the little dog: it had arrived perfectly well, it was the joy of the girls! A darling!"

John Dos Passos' novel The 42nd Parallel (1930) includes the line "Morton stood sleekhaired between them with a tray on which were decanters, tall glasses full of ice and some open splits of Apollinaris."

Dorothy L. Sayers' short story "Sleuths on the Scent", in the collection Hangman's Holiday (1933), includes the line "...in the commercial room at the Pig and Pewter....a young man and a girl in motor-cycling kit were whispering together at another table over a whisky-and-polly and a glass of port."

In E. F. Benson's novel Lucia's Progress (1935), the character Lucia discovers a fragment of glass marked with the letters "Apol", and concludes that the remains of a Roman temple lie beneath her garden. She subsequently finds the rest of the bottle, which supplies the full inscription "Apollinaris", and promptly ceases her excavations.

In the UK and Ireland, Apollinaris was sold in small bottles, which were marketed as "The Baby 'Polly". In the Ealing Studios film comedy My Learned Friend (1943), bumbling barrister Mr. Babbington (Claude Hulbert) orders a "Baby 'Polly" in a disreputable café in Stepney.

The poem "Sun and Fun" by Sir John Betjeman, published in 1954, includes the stanza:

I pulled aside the thick magenta curtains
– So Regency, so Regency, my dear –
And a host of little spiders
Ran a race across the ciders
To a box of baby 'pollies by the beer.

In the French film, A Monkey in Winter (1962; directed by Henri Verneuil), some men drinking in a bar try to remember the name of a poet, whose verses a former friend, said to be pretentious, always used to quote. They remember only that the name sounded like that of a mineral water, and they eventually agree on Apollinaris. The poet was in fact Apollinaire, who is indeed quoted by the main character in the film.

In the film American Psycho (2000), Patrick Bateman, played by Christian Bale, offers Detective Kimball (Willem Dafoe) a bottle of Apollinaris, which he politely tries to refuse. Bateman insists, also offering a lime.

The German language documentary Hitlers Todesbrigaden (2010), made by Andreas Novak, includes a reenacted scene in which Apollinaris bottles appear prominently on a serving tray brought to Nazi officers.

In the novel The Peripheral (2014) by William Gibson, the automatic minibar refuses to serve alcoholic drinks to Wilf Netherton and he is compelled to request Perrier. The minibar replies, "May I suggest Apollinaris water".
