= Francis Jeune, 1st Baron St Helier =

British judge

The Right Honourable The Lord St Helier GCB PC
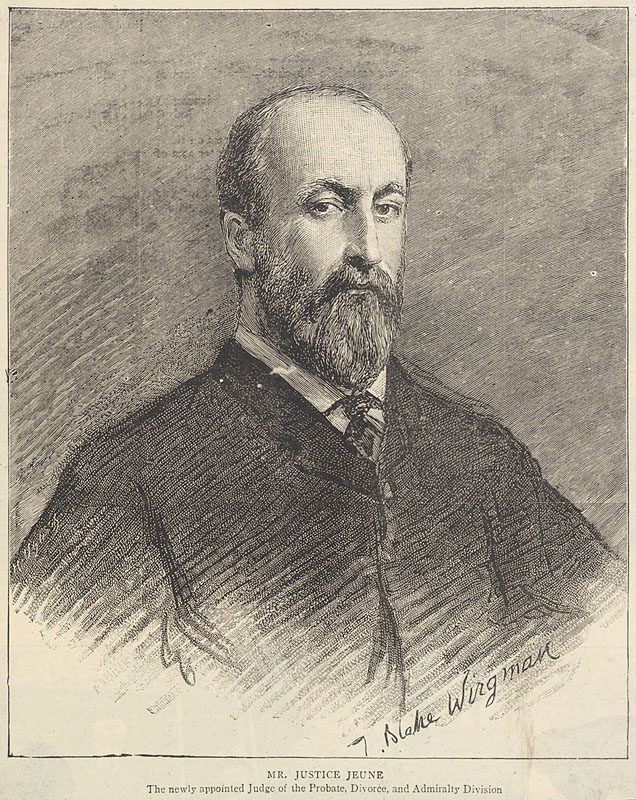
- Lord St Helier

President of the Probate, Divorce and Admiralty Division
- In office 2 June 1892 – 30 January 1905
- Preceded by: Sir Charles Butt
- Succeeded by: Sir Gorell Barnes

Judge Advocate General
- In office 31 December 1892 – 1905
- Prime Minister: William Ewart Gladstone; The Earl of Rosebery
- Preceded by: William Thackeray Marriott
- Succeeded by: -

Personal details
- Born: 17 March 1843
- Died: 9 April 1905 (aged 62)
- Spouse(s): Susan Stuart-Mackenzie (d. 1931)
- Education: Balliol College, Oxford

Francis Henry Jeune, 1st Baron St Helier, GCB, PC (17 March 1843 – 9 April 1905), known as Sir Francis Jeune (1891–1905), was a British judge. He was President of the Probate, Divorce and Admiralty Division of the High Court of Justice (1892–1905) and Judge Advocate General (1892–1905). According to, F. L. Wiswall Jr., "For better or for worse, it is fair to say that Sir Francis Henry Jeune had a greater influence upon the development of the Law of Admiralty than any single common lawyer since Coke."

== Background and education ==
Jeune was the son of The Right Reverend Francis Jeune, Bishop of Peterborough, and Margaret, daughter of Henry Symons. Educated at Harrow and Balliol College, Oxford, he was President of the Oxford Union in 1864. During his time at the Union the question of what to do about the fading murals in the debating chamber recently painted by artists associated with the Pre-Raphaelites came up for discussion. Jeune declared them to be 'hideous' and said he did not care what became of them. In 1868, he was called to the Bar, Inner Temple.

== Judicial career ==
In 1888, Jeune became a Queen's Counsel. In 1891, he was appointed as a Judge in the Probate, Divorce and Admiralty Division of the High Court and knighted. In June 1892, he became President of the Division in succession to Sir Charles Parker Butt and sworn of the Privy Council.

In December of that year, he was also appointed Judge Advocate General by Liberal Prime Minister William Ewart Gladstone. He continued as President of the Probate, Divorce and Admiralty Division until January 1905 when, beset by ill health, he resigned. In 1897, he was appointed a Knight Commander of the Order of the Bath (KCB). Five years later he was promoted to a Knight Grand Cross of the order (GCB) in the 1902 Coronation Honours list published on 26 June 1902, and was invested by King Edward VII at Buckingham Palace on 8 August 1902. In February 1905, he was granted an annuity of £3,500 and raised to the peerage as Baron St Helier of St Helier in the Island of Jersey and of Arlington Manor in the County of Berkshire.

== Family ==
On 17 August 1881, Lord St Helier married Susan Mary Elizabeth Stanley, the recently widowed daughter of Keith William Stewart-Mackenzie and Hannah Charlotte Hope-Vere. In 1882, their only child together, a son, Francis Jeune, was born; on 19 August 1904, he died of enteric fever in Poona, India. Lord St Helier died the next year, on 9 April 1905, aged 62. As he had no surviving male issue, the barony died with him. Lady St Helier became a Dame Commander of the Order of the British Empire in 1925. She died on 25 January 1931, aged 85.

His sister Margaret married Edwin Gifford.

== Works ==
The Mahometan Power in India - 1867

== Sources ==
- The Times, Monday, 22 August 1904; p. 7
- The Times, Monday, 10 April 1905; p. 6
- The Times, Monday, 26 January 1931; p. 12
- The Times, Friday, 8 October 1965; p. 1
- The Times, Saturday, 4 June 1966; p. 2
- "Alexander Mackenzie, History of The Mackenzies"
- Profile at worldroots.com

Legal offices
Preceded by Sir Charles Parker Butt	President of the Probate, Divorce and Admiralty Division; 1892–1905	Succeeded by Sir Gorell Barnes
Preceded by William Thackeray Marriott	Judge Advocate General; 1892–1905	Succeeded by Thomas Milvain
