= Thomas Henry Haddan =

Thomas Henry Haddan (1814–1873) was an English lawyer and newspaper editor, known as originator of The Guardian, a High Church weekly newspaper.

== Life ==
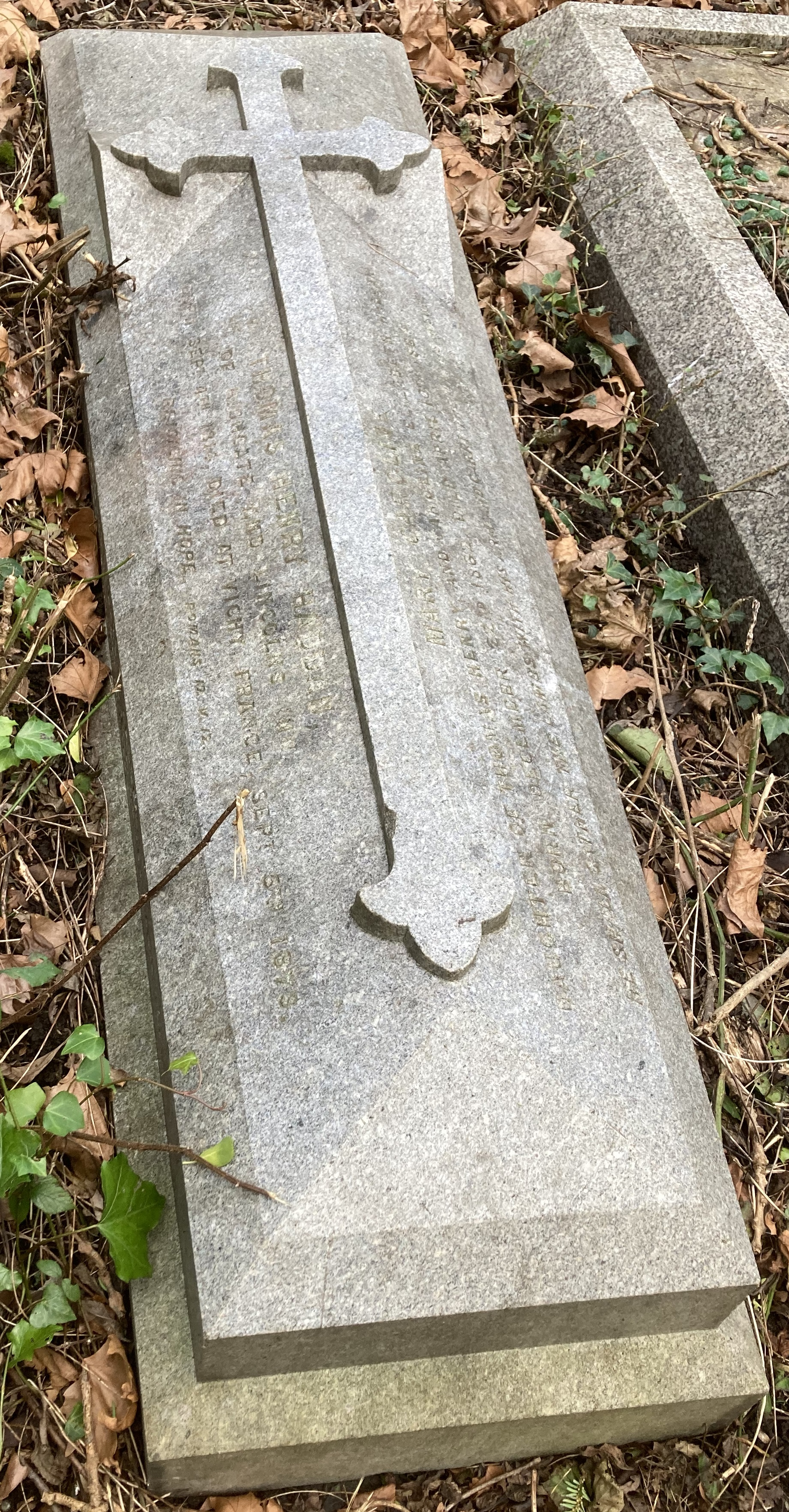
Grave of Thomas Henry Haddan in Highgate Cemetery

Haddan was eldest son of Thomas Haddan, solicitor, of Lime Street Square, London, by Mary Ann, daughter of John Haddan, and brother of Arthur West Haddan. He was born in London in 1814, and educated at a private school at Finchley. He matriculated at Brasenose College, Oxford, 2 July 1833, gained a scholarship there, took a double first in 1837, and graduated BA on 5 May in that year. He was Petrean fellow of Exeter College from 30 June 1837 until 11 January 1843. His essay entitled ‘The Test of National Prosperity considered’ obtained the chancellor's prize in 1838. He gained an Eldon Law Scholarship in 1840. He proceeded MA 1840, and BCL 1844 where he earnt the Vinerian Scholarship.

He was called to the bar of the Inner Temple 11 June 1841, and practised as an equity draftsman and conveyancer. He was a sound lawyer, and had a steady practice at the bar. At a meeting in his chambers, 6 New Square, Lincoln's Inn, in 1846, the Guardian newspaper was projected, a response to the conversion of John Henry Newman to Catholicism. The group of founders was led by Frederic Rogers, James Mozley, Richard William Church, Mountague Bernard, and the Haddan brothers. Thomas Haddan for a short time edited the paper, which was published for over a century. Contributors included Manning, Henry Wilberforce, Lord Chief Justice Coleridge, Henry Coleridge, Beresford Hope, Chretien (of Oriel), E. A. Freeman, John Fielder Mackarness, and Stafford Northcote, while he was private secretary to William Ewart Gladstone. Martin Richard Sharp in July 1846, succeeded John Fullagar as publisher, took an active part in its direction, became editor, and continued until his retirement in 1883.

In 1862, at the desire of the council of the Incorporated Law Society, he delivered a course of lectures on the jurisdiction of the court of chancery. Having gone to Vichy for the benefit of his health he died there rather suddenly on 5 September 1873, and was buried on 6 September; but his body was afterwards moved to a grave on the western side of Highgate Cemetery.

He married, 3 October 1861, Caroline Elizabeth, youngest daughter of James Bradley, of Moorlands, Bitterne, Southampton a captain in the Royal Navy (d. 1830) and his wife Caroline nee Western, by whom he left five children.

== Publications ==
1. ‘Remarks on Legal Education with reference to Legal Studies in the University of Oxford,’ 1848.
2. ‘The Limited Liability Act with Precedents and Notes,’ 1855.
3. ‘Outlines of Administrative Jurisdiction of the Court of Chancery,’ 1862.

He also wrote an interesting memoir of his brother Arthur, which was printed in A. P. Forbes's ‘Remains of Rev. A. W. Haddan,’ 1876, Introduction, pp. xix–xxix.
