= Mary Jeune, Baroness St Helier =

Baroness of St Helier

The Right Honourable The Lady St Helier DBE
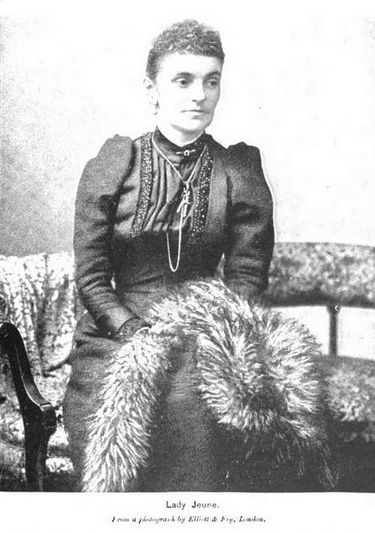
- Lady St Helier in 1896
- Born: Susan Elizabeth Mary Stewart-Mackenzie; 18 May 1845; Munich, Kingdom of Bavaria
- Died: 25 January 1931 (aged 85); London, England
- Spouses: John Constantine Stanley (m. 1871; died 1878) Francis Jeune, 1st Baron St Helier (m. 1881; died 1904)
- Children: 3
- Parent(s): Keith Stewart-Mackenzie; Hannah Hope-Vere

Susan Elizabeth Mary Jeune, Baroness St Helier, DBE (née Mackenzie, previously Stanley; 18 May 1845 – 25 January 1931), known as Mary Jeune, Baroness St Helier, was a London County Council alderman, writer, philanthropist and the wife of Francis Jeune, 1st Baron St Helier.

== Background ==
Susan Elizabeth Mary Stewart-Mackenzie was born in Munich, daughter of Keith William Stewart-Mackenzie, of Brahan Castle in Easter Ross (northern Scottish Highlands), and his wife, Hannah Charlotte Hope-Vere, daughter of James Joseph Hope-Vere. She was the eldest of three children. Her brother was the soldier James Stewart-Mackenzie, 1st Baron Seaforth.

Her sister Julia Charlotte Sophia (1846–1937) married three times: the soldier and ornithologist Arthur Hay, 9th Marquess of Tweeddale; the Scottish-Canadian businessman and politician Sir John Rose, 1st Baronet; and the politician Sir William Eden Evans-Gordon.

== Marriages and children ==
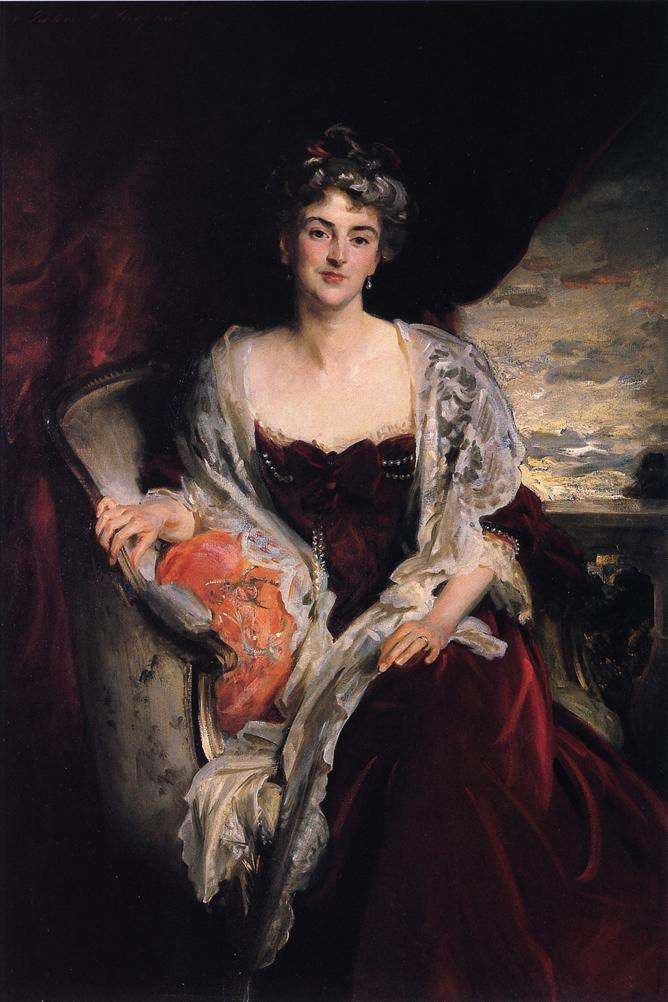
Mrs Augustus Allusen (Osma Mary Dorothy Stanley), John Singer Sargent, 1907

She was married, firstly, to Colonel John Constantine Stanley (30 September 1837 – 23 April 1878), son of Edward Stanley, 2nd Baron Stanley of Alderley and Henrietta Maria (née Dillon-Lee), on 15 August 1871. By this marriage she had two daughters:

- Madeline Cecilia Carlyle Stanley (2 July 1876 – 2 June 1966), who married (as his second wife) St John Brodrick in 1903
- Osma Mary Dorothy Stanley (1877 – 6 October 1965), who married Augustus Henry Eden Allhusen, JP, DL, of Stoke Court in Buckinghamshire.

She married, secondly, Francis Jeune, later Baron St Helier, on 17 August 1881. Their only child, a son, Francis Jeune, was born in 1882. He died of enteric fever in Poona, India on 19 August 1904.

== Life ==
An indefatigable London hostess, she was a friend of many of the celebrities of her day. The American novelist Edith Wharton mentions her with affection in her memoir 'A Backward Glance' (Chapter 10), and American journalist Ida B. Wells mentions how Lady Jeune supported her anti-lynching campaign by hosting a 'drawing room meeting of her friends' (see her autobiography Crusade for Justice, Chapter 20).

During World War I, Lady St Helier befriended a Canadian ex-cavalry officer named William Avery Bishop and used her connections to speed his acceptance into flight school. Billy Bishop went on to become one of the most successful and revered fighter pilots of all time.

In her later years, Lady St Helier resided at Poplar House in the village of Cold Ash, West Berkshire. She donated land for the village's parish room, an early form of community centre, which opened in 1911.

== Career ==
Lady St Helier was a London County Council alderman from 1910 to 1927. She was a very involved philanthropist, founding the All Saints Mission in Islington.

She wrote at least 50 periodical essays, which challenge the idea that Victorian middle and upper-middle class women were not capable of serious nonfiction writing.

Some of her essays have been republished, including "The Revolt of Daughters" (1894) in A New Woman Reader (2001). In 1909, she published a book, Memories of Fifty Years.

In 1884 she founded the Children’s Country Holidays Fund charity, which is still in operation in 2026.

She was appointed a Commander of the Order of the British Empire (CBE) in 1920 and elevated to Dame Commander of the Order of the British Empire (DBE) in the 1925 Birthday Honours.

== Portrayal in Media ==
Lady St Helier appears as a character in the Canadian stage musical Billy Bishop Goes to War.

== Death ==
Lady St Helier died on 25 January 1931, aged 85, of unknown causes. She is buried with her husband in St Mary the Virgin churchyard, Chieveley, Berkshire, UK. The estate of St Helier, London was named after her.

== Publications ==
Her publications include;

- Memories of Fifty Years
- Lesser questions
- Ladies at work
