= Robert Warburton =

Anglo-Indian soldier and administrator (1842–1899)

Sir Robert Warburton
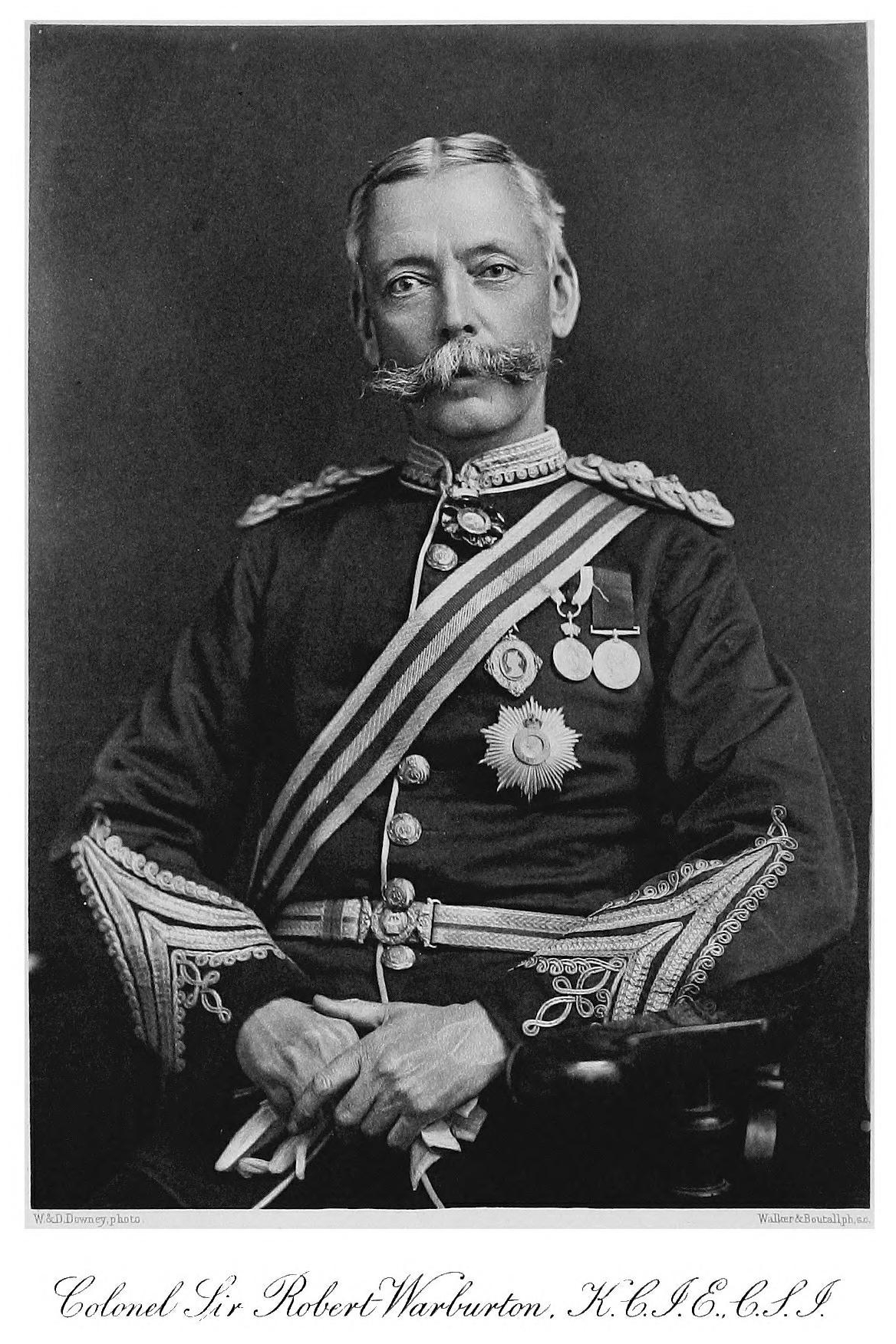
- Born: 11 July 1842; Emirate of Afghanistan
- Died: 22 April 1899 (aged 56); Number 3, Russell Road, Kensington, London, England
- Occupation: Military
- Parents: Lt. Col. Robert Warburton (father); Shah Jahan Begum (mother)

Colonel Sir Robert Warburton KCIE CSI (11 July 1842 – 22 April 1899) was a British soldier and administrator. Half-Afghan and proficient in both Persian and Pashto, he served for many years as British political officer in charge of the Khyber Pass, a region of strategic importance to British India. He helped maintain peace with the Afridis, who rose in revolt eighteen years after his retirement.

== Early life and education ==
Robert Warburton was born in a Ghilzai fort between Jagdallak and Mak on 11 July 1842, the only son of Lt. Col. Robert Warburton (1812–1863), of the Royal Artillery, by Shah Jahan Begum, niece of the Amir Dost Mohammed of Afghanistan. His father was a younger son of Richard Warburton, of Garryhinch, Queen's County, Ireland. The latter's father, John Warburton, MP for Queen's County, had served under General Wolfe at Quebec in 1759.

At the time of Robert's birth his mother was fleeing from the troopers of Sardar Muhammad Akbar Khan, who pursued her for months after the massacre of English at Kabul on 1 November 1841. She was sheltered by her relatives and finally rejoined her husband on 20 September 1842.

At the close of the Afghan war, Robert and his mother accompanied his father's battery to Sipri, whence they removed to Morar in Gwalior. In 1850, Robert was placed at school at Mussoorie under Robert North Maddock, where he remained until 1 December 1856. He was then sent to England, and educated at Kensington Grammar School under G. Frost. Thence he obtained a cadetship, and after one term at the Royal India Military College, Addiscombe, and two at the Royal Military Academy at Woolwich, he obtained his commission in the Royal Regiment of Artillery on 18 December 1861.

== Career ==
In 1862, Warburton was sent to India and stationed with the 1st battery of the 24th brigade at Fort Govindghar, the fortress of Amritsar. In August 1864, he transferred to F battery of the 18th brigade and was stationed at Mian Mir.

In 1866, the failure of the Agra and Masterman's Bank left him with only his pay to support himself and his mother. To increase his resources he transferred to the 21st Punjab Infantry. This regiment was then under orders for the Abyssinian campaign, and disembarked at Zoula on 1 February 1868. While serving with the transport train Warburton showed great tact in conciliating native feeling, and received the thanks of Sir Robert Napier for his services. When he was invalided to England, Napier interested himself in his behalf, and wrote to the lieutenant-governor of the Punjab recommending him for employment on the frontier.

On his return to India in April 1869, Warburton was attached as a probationer to the 15th Ludhiana Sikhs, and in July 1870 was appointed to the Punjab commission as an assistant commissioner to the Peshawar division. At the end of September 1872, he was removed temporarily to the sub-district of Yusafzai and stationed at Hoti-mardan, and in February 1876 he was permanently appointed. Under Sir Pierre Louis Napoleon Cavagnari, he took part in several enterprises against the hill tribes who persisted in raiding British territory, particularly against the Utman Khel in 1878, and was five times complimented by the government of the Punjab and thrice by the secretary of state for India. In 1879, during the Afghan campaign, Cavagnari made repeated applications for his services, but the Punjab government refused to spare him. In July, however, he was appointed political officer of the Khyber, a post that he held for eighteen years.

On the news of the murder of Cavagnari at the Siege of the British Residency in Kabul, Warburton was nominated chief political officer with General Sir Robert Onesiphorus Bright, commanding the Jalalabad field force. He joined the force on 10 October, and proceeded to Jalalabad to ascertain the revenues of the district. In April 1880, he was invalided to England, and he did not return to the Khyber Pass until 16 February 1882. From that time he remained on the frontier almost continuously until his retirement.

He held a remarkable influence over the hill tribes, perhaps in part owing to his Afghan blood. He raised the Khyber Rifles from among these tribes, a force which for many years kept the pass tranquil. His camp became the rendezvous of mutually hostile tribesmen, who refrained from hostilities so long as they remained within its precincts. He was accustomed to travel with no weapon but a walking-stick, and everywhere met with demonstrations of attachment. Able to converse fluently with the learned in Persian and with the common folk in the vernacular Pashto, he succeeded, by his acquaintance with tribal life and character, in gaining an exceptional influence over the border Afghans. In 1881, he attained the rank of major, and in 1887 that of lieutenant-colonel.

On 1 January 1890, in recognition of his services, he was created C.S.I. In 1893, he was nominated to the brevet rank of colonel. He resigned his post on 11 July 1897, and received the thanks of the Punjab government. He had frequently requested government to give him an English assistant who might continue his policy and succeed to his influence after his retirement. This request was never granted, and the advent of a successor without local experience was at once followed by disquiet. On the outbreak of unrest among the Afridis in August, he was asked by the Indian government on 13 August whether he was willing to resume his service in connection with the Khyber Pass and the Afridis. He declared himself willing, but on 23 August, before definite orders had been given, hostilities broke out. He served with the Tirah expedition, and in 1898 he was created Knight Commander of the Order of the Indian Empire. The hardships of the Tirah campaign exhausted him, and the loss of the Khyber port broke his heart.

== Death ==
Warburton returned to England with broken health, and died at 3 Russell Road, Kensington, on 22 April 1899. He was buried at Brompton Cemetery on 27 April.

== Personal life ==
In 1868, Warburton married Mary, eldest daughter of William Cecil of Dyftrin, Monmouthshire. After her husband's death she edited his memoir Eighteen Years in the Khyber, published in 1900.

== Honours ==
- Companion of the Order of the Star of India (CSI), 1890
- Knight Commander of the Order of the Indian Empire (KCIE), 1898

== Bibliography ==
- Carlyle, E. I.; Falkner, James (reviewer) (2004). "Warburton, Sir Robert (1842–1899)". Oxford Dictionary of National Biography (online ed.). Oxford University Press. doi:10.1093/ref:odnb/28677. (Subscription, Wikipedia Library access or UK public library membership required.)
- Chisholm, Hugh, ed. (1911). "Warburton, Colonel Sir Robert" . Encyclopædia Britannica. Vol. 28 (11th ed.). Cambridge University Press. p. 318.
- Warburton, Robert (1900). Eighteen years in the Khyber, 1879–1898. John Murray. p. 17. "Robert Warburton."
