= Frederick Greenwood =

English journalist (1830–1909)

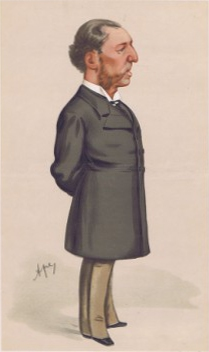
- "He created The Pall Mall Gazette."; Greenwood as caricatured by Ape (Carlo Pellegrini) in Vanity Fair, June 1880
- Born: April 1830
- Died: 14 December 1909 (aged 79); Sydenham, London, England
- Occupation(s): Journalist, editor

Frederick Greenwood (25 March 1830 – 14 December 1909) was an English journalist, editor, and man of letters. He completed Elizabeth Gaskell's novel Wives and Daughters after her death in 1865.

== Early years ==
Born in Kensington, London, he was the oldest of eleven children of James Caer Greenwood, a coach builder, and his wife, Mary Ann, née Fish. He and two brothers – James and Charles, gained reputations as journalists. Frederick started life in a printing house, but at an early age began to write in periodicals. In 1853 he contributed a sketch of Napoleon III to a volume called The Napoleon Dynasty (2nd ed., 1855). He also wrote several novels: The Loves of an Apothecary (1854), The Path of Roses (1859) and (with his brother James) Under a Cloud (1860).

To the second number of the Cornhill Magazine he contributed "An Essay without End," and this led to an introduction to Thackeray. In 1862, when Thackeray resigned the editorship of the Cornhill, Greenwood became joint editor with G. H. Lewes. In 1864 he was appointed sole editor, a post which he held until 1868. While at the Cornhill he wrote an article in which he suggested, to some extent, how Thackeray might have intended to conclude his unfinished work Denis Duval. In its pages appeared the "sensation" novel Margaret Denzil's History, Greenwood's most ambitious work of fiction, also published in volume form in 1864.

Frederick Greenwood completed Elizabeth Gaskell's unfinished novel Wives and Daughters after she died suddenly in 1865.

== Pall Mall Gazette ==
Greenwood conceived the idea of an evening newspaper, which, with news, should mainly contain original articles. Public affairs and culture were to be discussed by authoritative figures. He took the Anti-Jacobin and the Saturday Review of 1864 as models. The idea was taken up by George Smith, and the Pall Mall Gazette, named after Thackeray's fictional paper in Pendennis was launched in February 1865, with Greenwood as editor. Within a few years he became an influential Tory. "No minister in Great Britain," Mr Gladstone declared, "ever had a more able, a more zealous, a more effective supporter for his policy than Lord Beaconsfield had in Greenwood."

It was on the suggestion of Greenwood that Beaconsfield purchased in 1875 the Suez Canal shares of the Khedive Ismail; the British government was informed by Greenwood that the shares were for sale and likely to be bought by France. Greenwood waited for the official announcement before publishing the news.

== Later years ==
Early in 1880 the Pall Mall changed owners, and the new proprietor, Henry Yates Thompson, shifted editorial policy to supporting the Liberal Party. Greenwood at once resigned his editorship, but in May a new paper, the St James's Gazette, was started for him by Mr Henry Hucks Gibbs (afterwards Lord Aldenham), and Greenwood proceeded to carry on in it the tradition which he had established in the Pall Mall. At the St James's Greenwood remained for over eight years, continuing to exercise a marked influence upon political affairs, notably as a pungent critic of the Gladstone administration (1880–1885) and an independent supporter of Lord Salisbury. His connection with the paper ceased in August 1888, owing to disagreements with the new proprietor, Mr E Steinkopff, who had bought the St James's at Greenwood's own suggestion.

In January 1891 Greenwood brought out a weekly review which he named the Anti-Jacobin. It failed, however, to gain public support, the last number appearing in January 1892. In 1893 he published The Lover's Lexicon and in 1894 Imagination in Dreams. He continued to express his views on political and social questions in contributions to newspapers and magazines, writing frequently in the Westminster Gazette, the Pall Mall, Blackwood, the Cornhill, etc. Towards the end of his life his political views reverted in some respects to the Liberalism of his early days.

In the words of George Meredith Greenwood was not only a great journalist, he had a statesman's head. The national interests were always urgent at his heart. He was remarkable for securing for his papers the services of the ablest writers of the day, and for the gift of recognising merit in new writers, such, for instance, as Richard Jefferies and J. M. Barrie. His instinct for capacity in others was as sure as was his journalistic judgment. In 1905, on the occasion of his 75th birthday, a dinner was given in his honour by leading statesmen, journalists, and men of letters (with John Morley—who had succeeded him as editor of the Pall Mall—in the chair). In May 1907 he contributed to Blackwood an article on "The New Journalism," in which he drew a sharp contrast between the old and the new conditions under which the work of a newspaper writer is conducted. He belonged to the Garrick Club. He died at Sydenham on 14 December 1909.

== Bibliography ==
- Scott, J. W. Robertson. The Story of the Pall Mall Gazette; of Its First Editor, Frederick Greenwood; and Its Founder, George Murray Smith. Oxford University Press. 1950

Media offices
Preceded by (founding editor)	Editor of The Pall Mall Gazette; 1865–1880	Succeeded by John Morley
