= British Brothers' League =

British anti-immigration pressure group

- Formation: 1901
- Founder: William Stanley Shaw
- Dissolved: 1923
- Type: Pressure group
- Purpose: Opposition to immigration
- Location: United Kingdom

The British Brothers' League (BBL) was a British anti-immigration, extraparliamentary, pressure group, the "largest and best organised" of its time. Described, in the 21st century, as antisemitic, the group attempted to organise along paramilitary lines.

== History ==
The group was formed in May 1901 in East London as a response to waves of immigration that had begun in 1880 and had seen a rapid increase in the numbers of Russian and Polish Jews, as well as others from Eastern Europe, into the area. As a result, Captain William Stanley Shaw formed the BBL to campaign for restricted immigration with the slogan 'England for the English' and soon formed a close alliance with local Conservative MP Major Evans-Gordon. Initially the League was not antisemitic and was more interested in keeping out the poorest immigrants regardless of background, although eventually Jews became the main focus. The organisation promoted their cause with large meetings, which were stewarded by guards whose role was to eject opponents who entered and raised objections.

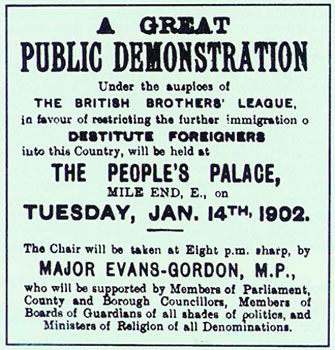
Anti-immigration poster, from 1902

The League claimed 45,000 members, although membership was actually fairly irregular as no subscriptions were charged and anyone who signed the organisation's manifesto was considered a member, with Tory MP Howard Vincent amongst them. As a result attempts to militarise the group largely failed, although the movement continued to organise demonstrations against immigrants. The Aliens Act 1905, which restricted immigration, was largely seen as a success for the BBL and, as a result, the movement by and large disappeared.

It officially carried on until 1923, albeit on a tiny scale, and was associated with G. K. Chesterton and the distributist movement. Nonetheless, they resurfaced from time to time with new immigrant scares, and shortly before the outbreak of the First World War they received a public donation of ten shillings from Sir Arthur Conan Doyle, who had been caught up in a growing public swell of Germanophobia as war loomed.

The league also left behind a legacy of support for far-right groups in East London and this was exploited by the British Union of Fascists, the British League of Ex-Servicemen and Women, the Union Movement and the National Front who gained followings there.
