= Sudetenquell =

Nazi-run mineral water producer

The SS owned Sudetenquell GmbH (literally Sudeten Spring GmbH) was projected towards the end of 1938 and formally established in April 1939 (several months ahead of the invasion of Poland), as the mineral water producer in Sudetenland during World War II. To develop the springs for mass exploitation a forced labour camp in Czech territory opened in August 1942 in the West Bohemian place of Korunní Kyselka (German: Krondorf-Sauerbrunn). It was a subcamp of KZ Flossenbürg. By 1944, the Schutzstaffel (SS) had purchased 75 per cent of the mineral water producers in Germany and were intending to acquire a monopoly.
