= The Guardian (Anglican newspaper) =

Anglican newspaper

- Founder(s): Richard William Church, Thomas Henry Haddan
- Founded: January 1846
- Ceased publication: November 1951

The Guardian was a weekly Anglican newspaper published from January 1846 to November 1951. It was founded by Richard William Church, Thomas Henry Haddan, and other supporters of the Tractarian movement and was for many years the leading newspaper of the Church of England. Montague Bernard, another of the paper's founders, served as its initial editor, with Martin Sharp taking over responsibility for the paper in 1859. He stood down as editor in 1883 and was replaced by Daniel Conner Lathbury. His outspoken views on political and ecclesiastical matters, and especially his opposition to the Boer War, led to his dismissal in 1899. Later editors included Walter Hobhouse (1900–05), James Penderel-Brodhurst (1905-22) and Frederic Iremonger (1922–27).

Virginia Woolf's earliest published writings appeared in the newspaper in 1905, after an introduction to the paper's editor of the Women's Supplement, Margaret Lyttelton, by her friend, Violet Dickinson. Woolf, then Virginia Stephen, contributed book reviews and essays, including an obituary for the Stephen family's pet dog, Shag.

C. S. Lewis published his Screwtape Letters in thirty-one installments in The Guardian from 2 May till 28 November 1941, and The Great Divorce in twenty-three installments from 10 November 1944 till 13 April 1945; the latter series appeared under the title "Who Goes Home?". During the Second World War Lewis also contributed some of his essays to The Guardian, starting with "Dangers of National Repentance" in March 1940, and later including "Miracles" (October 1942), "Dogma and the Universe" and "Dogma and Science" (both in March 1943).

The paper closed in November 1951 due to increased costs of production.
