= James Stewart-Mackenzie, 1st Baron Seaforth =

British peer (1847–1923)

Colonel The Right Honourable The Lord Seaforth JP DL

Member of the House of Lords Lord Temporal
- In office 3 February 1921 – 3 March 1923; Hereditary Peerage

Personal details
- Born: James Alexander Francis Humberston Stewart-Mackenzie; 9 November 1847
- Died: 3 March 1923 (aged 75)
- Parent(s): Keith William Stewart-Mackenzie; Hannah Charlotte Hope-Vere
- Education: Glenalmond College
- Occupation: Soldier, politician, philanthropist

Colonel James Alexander Francis Humberston Stewart-Mackenzie, 1st Baron Seaforth, JP, DL (9 November 1847 – 3 March 1923) was a Scottish soldier, who was regarded by many as chief of Clan Mackenzie.

Stewart-Mackenzie was the son of Keith William Stewart-Mackenzie (a son of James Alexander Stewart-Mackenzie) and Hannah Charlotte (daughter of James Joseph Hope-Vere). His sister became a society hostess and politician, known as Mary Jeune, Baroness St Helier. His grandmother was Mary Elizabeth Frederica Mackenzie, daughter and heiress of Francis Mackenzie, 1st Baron Seaforth, whose title had become extinct when his four sons all predeceased him.

He was educated at Glenalmond College and in 1867 was commissioned into the 9th Lancers. He served for over thirty years, retiring as the regiment's colonel. He fought at Maidan, Kabul, Sherpur and Kandahar in the Afghan War of 1878–1880. He then served as military secretary to Sir Mountstuart Grant Duff, Governor of Madras.

Following his retirement he devoted himself mainly to the management of his estates from his ancestral seat of Brahan Castle in Ross and Cromarty. He was appointed a Vice-Lieutenant of Ross and Cromarthy in March 1900, and was elected to Ross and Cromarty County Council. He also carried out considerable philanthropic work in the area.

He was raised to the peerage in the 1921 New Year Honours for his services to Ross and Cromarty, taking the same title as his great-grandfather, Baron Seaforth, of Brahan in Urray in the County of Ross and Cromarty. Two years later he died of pneumonia without an heir and the title once again became extinct.

== Footnotes ==
Peerage of the United Kingdom
New creation	Baron Seaforth; 1921–1923	Extinct
