= Walter Burton Harris =

British journalist (1866–1933)

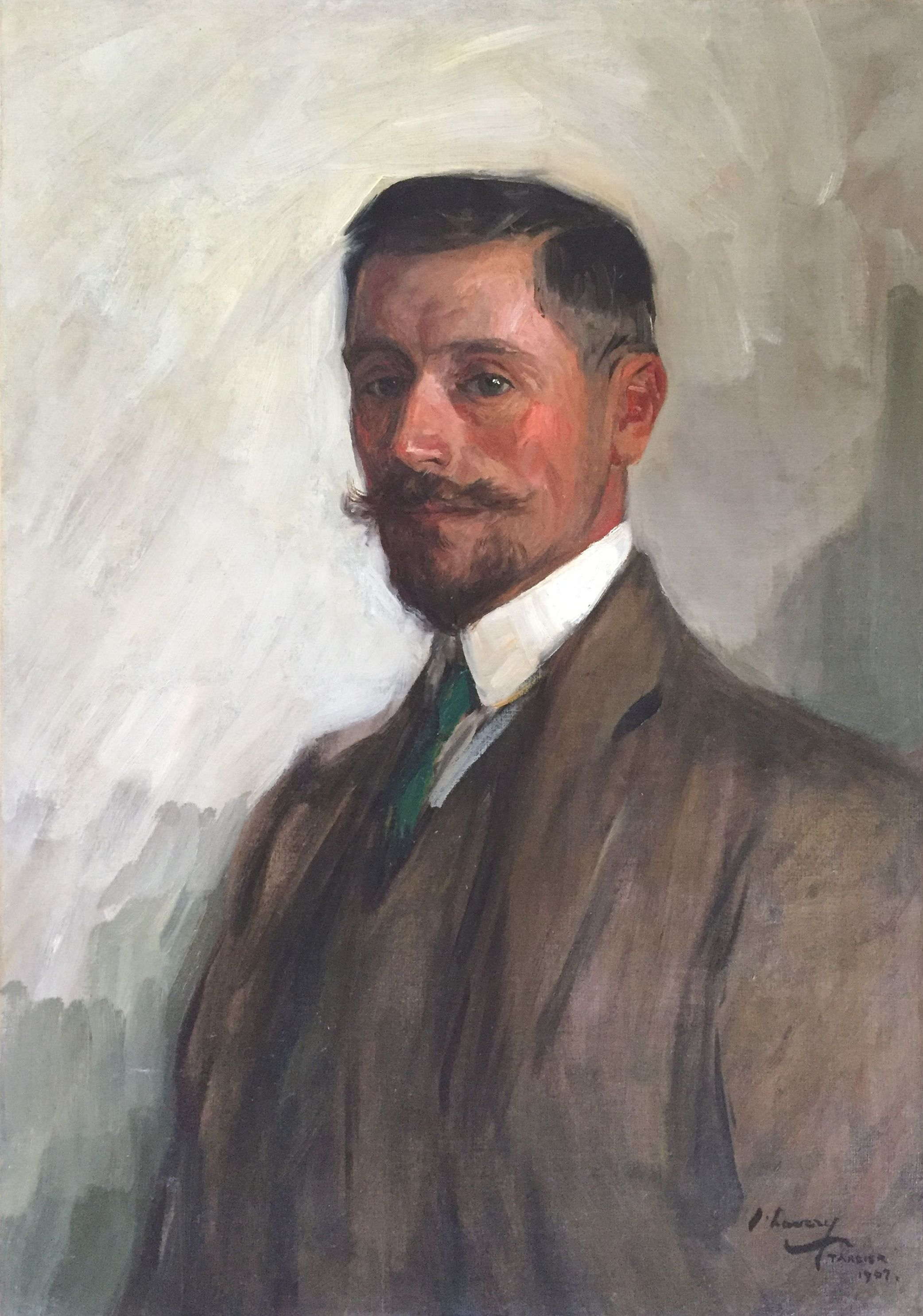
- Harris by Sir John Lavery (1907)
- Born: 29 August 1866
- Died: 4 April 1933 (aged 66)
- Occupation: Journalist

Walter Burton Harris (29 August 1866 – 4 April 1933) was a journalist, writer, traveller and socialite who achieved fame for his writings on Morocco, where he worked for many years as special correspondent for The Times. He settled in the country at the age of 19, eventually building himself a fine villa in Tangier where he lived for much of his life. His linguistic skills and physical appearance enabled him to pose successfully as a native Moroccan, travelling to parts of the country regarded as off-limits to foreigners. He wrote a number of well-regarded books and articles on his travels in Morocco and other countries in the Near and Far East. Harris also played a significant, though not always constructive, role in the European diplomatic intrigues that affected Morocco around the turn of the 20th century.

== Early career and travels ==
Harris was born in London as the second son of a prosperous shipping and insurance broker, Frederick W. Harris. His siblings included Sir Austin Edward Harris, who became a noted banker, Frederick Leverton Harris, a British Member of Parliament, and pianist and composer Clement Harris, who was killed in the Greco-Turkish War of 1897. He was educated at Harrow School and (briefly) at Cambridge University and had already managed to travel around the world by the age of 18.

In 1887 he accompanied a British diplomatic mission to Morocco and settled in Tangier at the age of 19. He was briefly married to Lady Mary Savile, the daughter of the 4th Earl of Mexborough from 1898 to 1906, but the marriage was annulled on the grounds of non-consummation. He lived an openly homosexual, tending towards paedophilic, lifestyle thereafter, though this was little hindrance in the social milieu of Tangier at the time. He was independently wealthy, living off a personal allowance and a stipend from The Times, and was an ambitious social climber who associated with royalty and high-ranking politicians.

Harris was a fluent speaker of French, Spanish and Moroccan Arabic, and his physical features were such that he could pass for a native Moroccan. This enabled him to travel undetected into the interior of Morocco, which was at the time off-limits to outsiders, and thus see and describe places that no European had been to. During his travels he disguised himself as an inhabitant of the Rif, looking (as The Times put it) like "the complete fanatical-looking type, with shaven head but for a foot-long lock hanging from the crown, red guncase for turban, short brown jelab, bare reddish-tanned neck and legs, carrying a long native musket, and glancing furtively as he went, just as such men from home do."

He soon won the respect of the Moroccans for his exploits and made some unlikely friends, such as the mountain chieftain Raisuni who repeatedly fought the Moroccan government (and later the Spanish) during the first 25 years of the 20th century. Harris was captured and briefly imprisoned by Raisuni, regaining his freedom via a prisoner exchange, but came to establish a friendship with the chieftain and later wrote admiringly about him. He was also a confidant of at least three Moroccan sultans and built himself a fine home in Tangier, the Villa Harris.

== Journalistic career and political involvement ==
Harris began writing for The Times in 1887 and became a permanent correspondent from 1906, at a time when Morocco was becoming a focus for conflict between the European powers. He had a first-hand view of the dynastic conflicts and political weaknesses that culminated in Morocco becoming a protectorate of France and Spain in 1912 and chronicled the events of that period in a series of articles for The Times, as well as writing a number of books on his travels in Morocco. He also travelled further afield, visiting Egypt, the Near East and the Far East. He served as a special correspondent in the Yemen in 1892 and in Athens in 1915, where he caused a dispute between King Constantine I of Greece and Eleftherios Venizelos after writing articles critical of the latter for The Times. He claimed to have worked for Admiralty intelligence during the latter part of the First World War.

He played an active part in the international disputes in Morocco, using his access to high-ranking Moroccan figures to influence the course of events. Britain had long been Morocco's dominant trading partner and Harris initially opposed France's ambitions to play a bigger role in the country. He believed that Morocco's independence should be preserved and that the country should be helped to modernise itself and overcome the endemic disorder that plagued it. He therefore helped initially to support the Germans, who likewise opposed French involvement in Morocco, until he was instructed in 1905 by The Times' foreign editor Valentine Chirol – who was closely linked to the British Foreign Office – that it was necessary to support the French. The Entente Cordiale, signed in 1904, clearly assigned Egypt and Morocco to the spheres of influence of Britain and France respectively. In the Hafidiya coup, Harris attacked the Makhzen of Abd al-Hafid in The Times,, whom France also opposed.

Harris thereafter toned down his hostility to France, though he continued to press for international efforts to assist Morocco's modernisation. He came to admire the efficiency of the administration of French Morocco and was scathing of the maladministration of Spanish Morocco. His role was not always helpful to the British government as he periodically undermined the efforts of British diplomats in Morocco; some regarded him as a useful ally and go-between, thanks to his extensive contacts, while others reviled him. France was duly grateful for Harris's efforts on its behalf and awarded him the Legion of Honour and the title of "Commander of the Oiussam Alaouite of Morocco". His travel writing also earned him a fellowship from the Royal Geographical Society. He was far from modest about his achievements; as the editor of a re-edition of his book Morocco That Was puts it, he "loved to tell stories, especially about himself", to the point that "it is hard to distinguish the truth from the legend"; he "loved to make his own part in any yarn he was telling into a hymn about his own cleverness, cunning, bravery, popularity, and importance. All his geese had to be swans and his over-vivid imagination made sure that his listeners were never allowed to forget this." Harris was journeying east across the Mediterranean when he had a stroke. The ship he was traveling on put in at Malta and he was taken to the King George V hospital where he died on 4 April 1933. His body was taken back to Tangier and he was buried there at the Church of St Andrew.

== Villa Harris in Tangier ==
In the 1890s Harris erected an expansive villa facing the beach at Malabata, which he used until his death. The structure was later operated as a casino, then acquired in the 1960s by Club Med which used it until 1992. It subsequently fell into disrepair despite designation in 2007 as a building of national historic value. It was eventually renovated and opened on 2021/03/16 as a museum, with exhibits donated by Moroccan art collector El Khalil Belguench that include works by Jules Jacques Veyrassat, Jacques Majorelle, Edy Legrand, Claudio Bravo, Muhammad Ben Ali Ribati, Mohamed Ben Allal, Ahmed Yacoubi, and Mohamed Hamri.

== Works ==
- The Land of the African Sultan: Travels in Morocco, 1887, 1888, and 1889 (Sampson Low, Marston, Searle & Rivington, 1889)
- A Journey through the Yemen (William Blackwood, 1893)
- Tafilet: The Narrative of a Journey of Exploration in the Atlas Mountains and the Oases of the North-west Sahara (William Blackwood, 1895) Gutenberg
- From Batum to Baghdad by way of Tiflis, Tabriz and Persian Kurdistan (William Blackwood & Son, 1896)
- Morocco That Was (William Blackwood & Sons, 1921; new edition by Eland in 2002)
- France, Spain and the Rif (Arnold, 1927)
- East for Pleasure: The Narrative of Eight Months' Travel in Burma, Sian, the Netherlands East Indies and French Indo-China (Arnold, 1929)
- East Again: The Narrative of a Journey in the Near, Middle and Far East (Butterworth, 1933)

A diary belonging to Harris describing his travels in Europe during the 1880s or 1890s is held at the Cadbury Research Library, University of Birmingham.

== Gallery ==
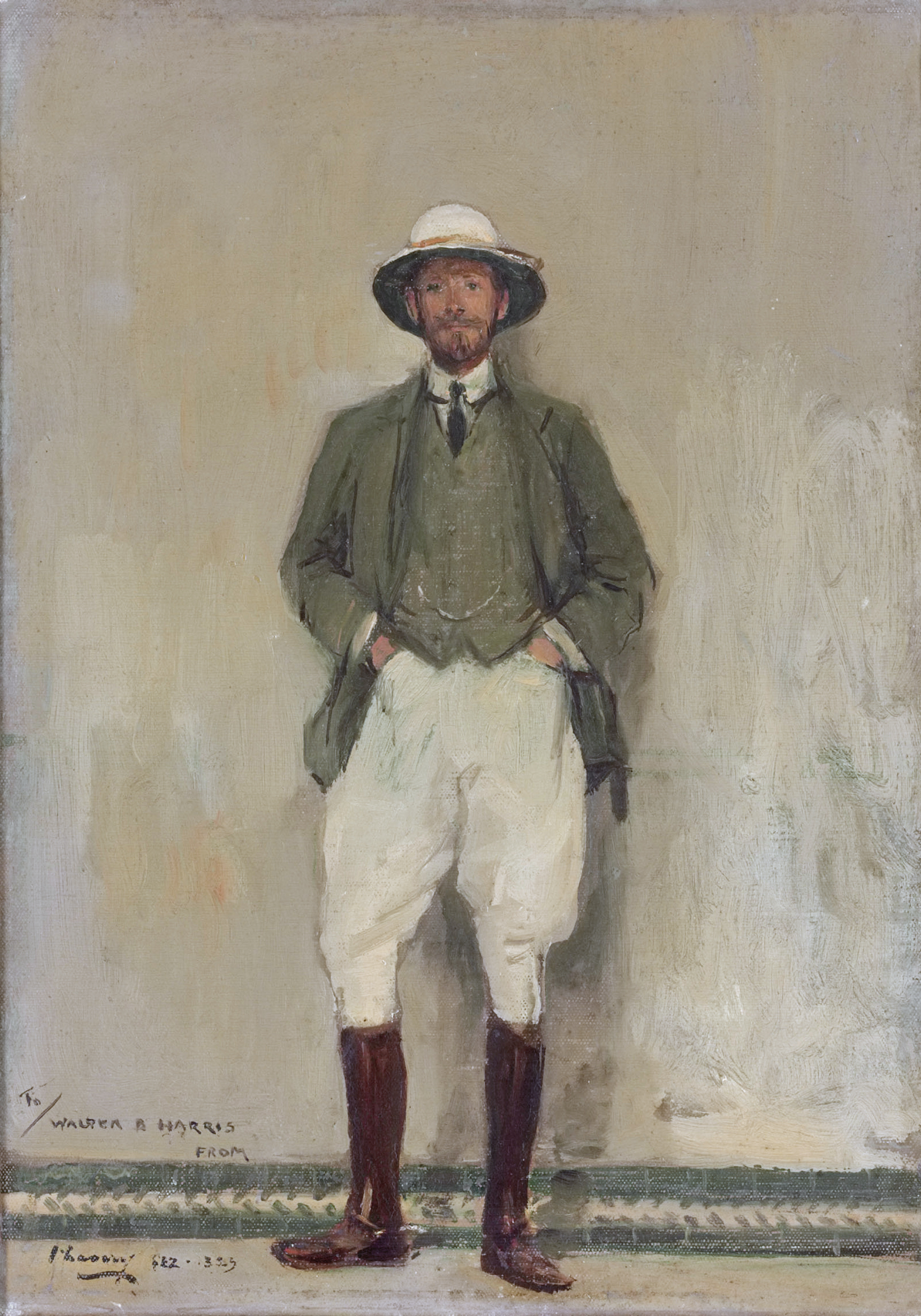
Walter Burton Harris by John Lavery

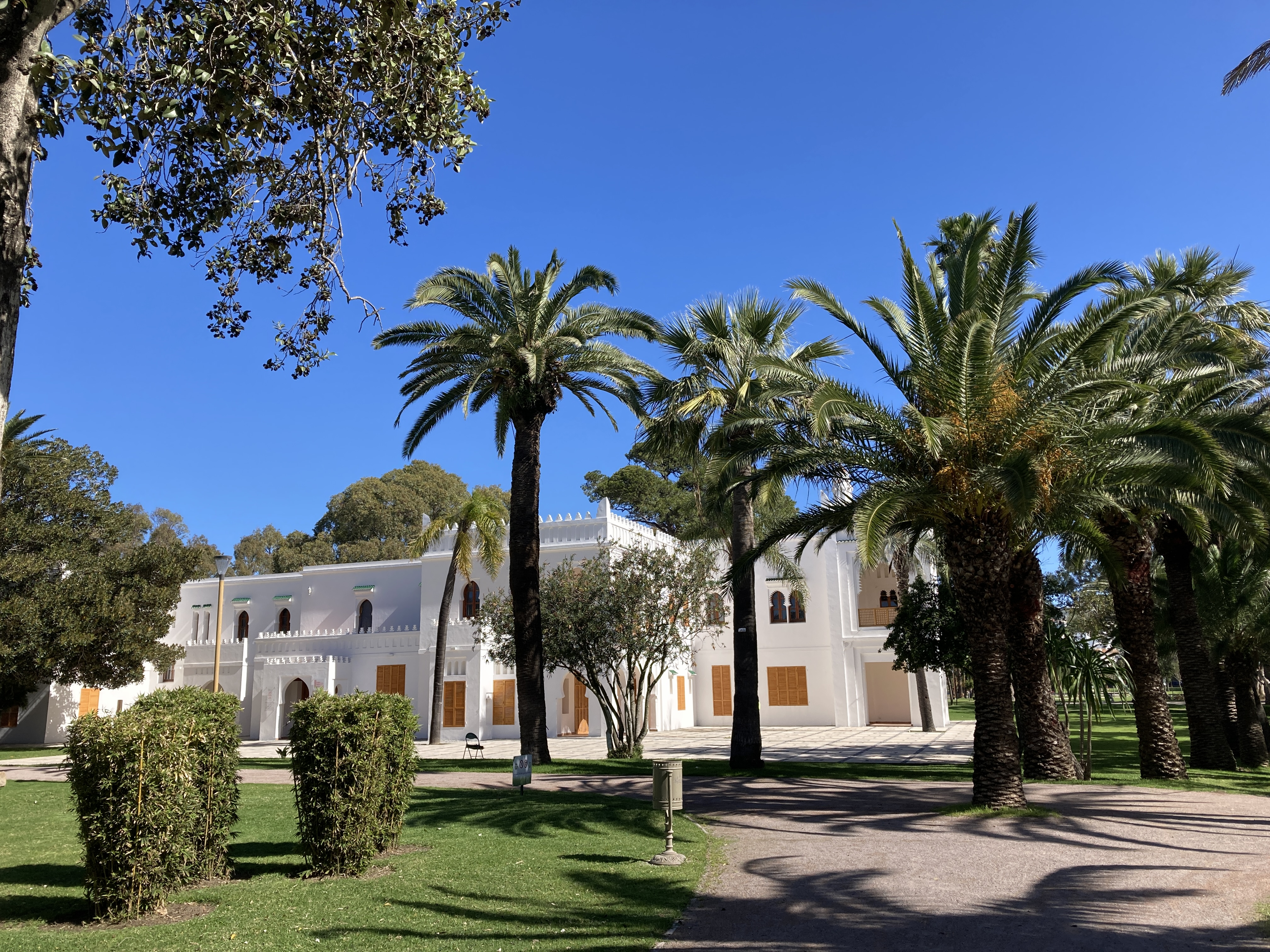
Villa Harris in Tangier

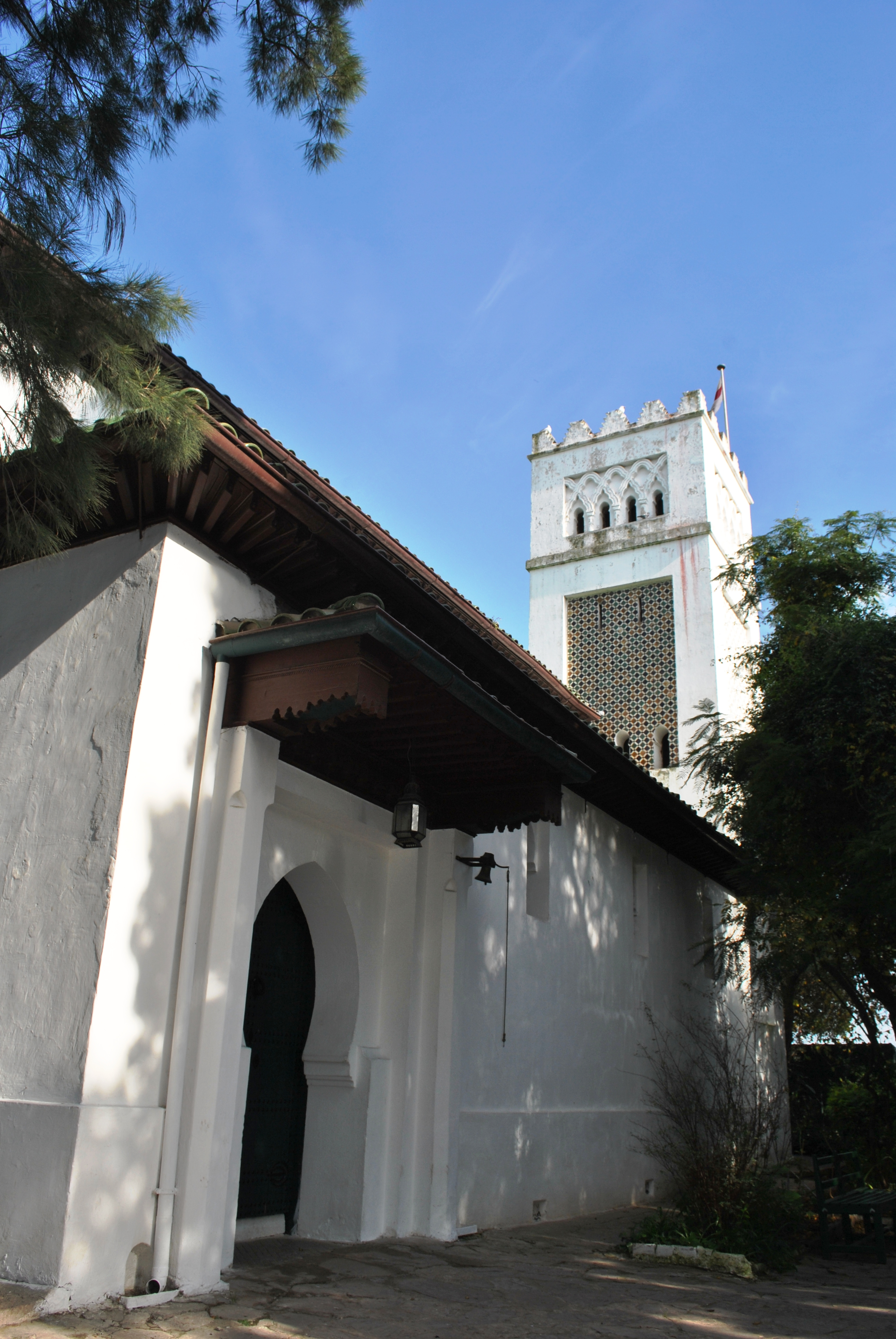
St Andrew's Church, Tangier

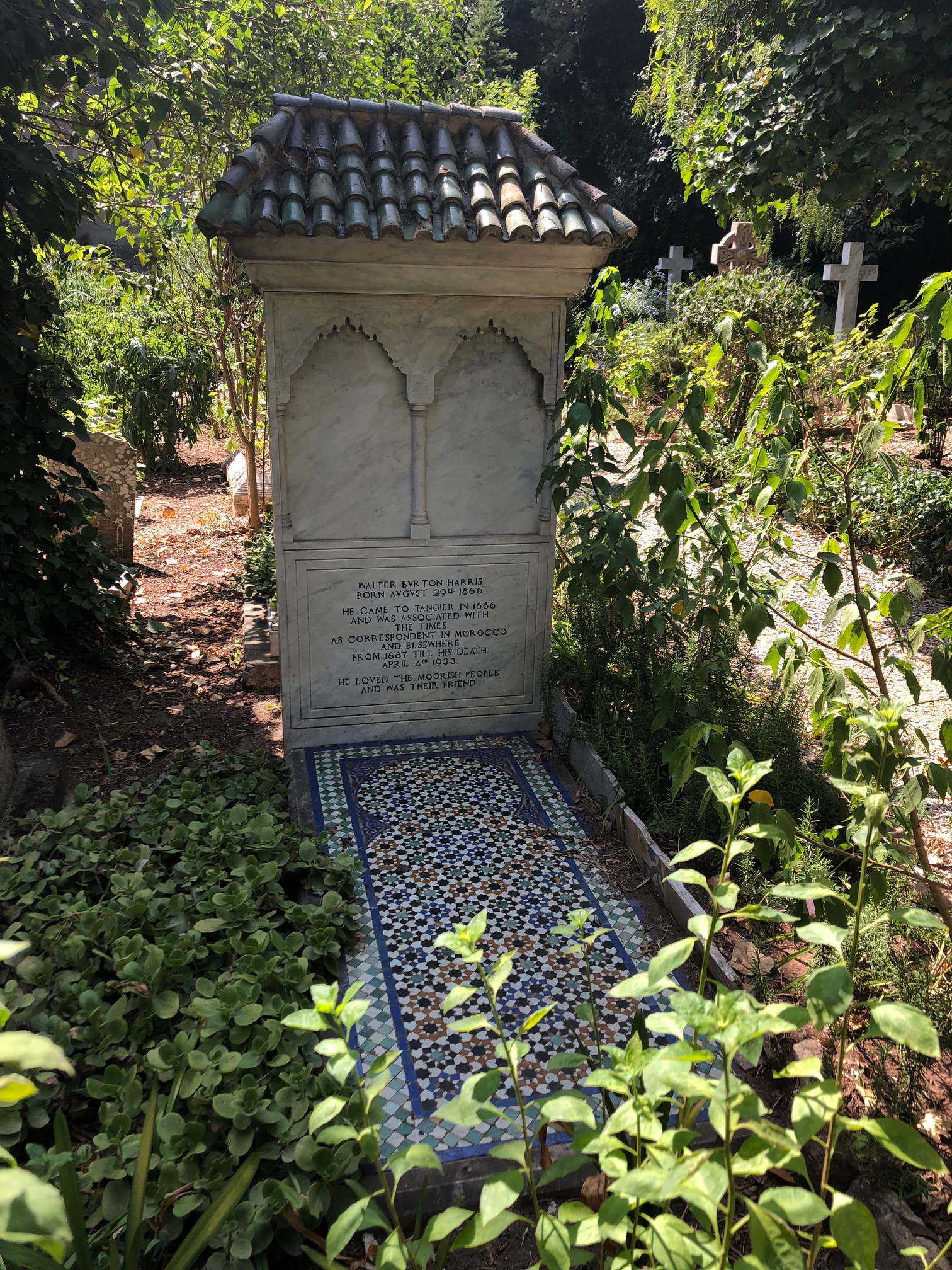
Harris's grave in the churchyard of St Andrews

== See also ==
- Perdicaris Park

== Sources ==
- al-Khudaymī, Alāl (2009). الحركة الحفيظية، أو، المغرب قبيل فرض الحماية الفرنسية : الوضعية الداخلية وتحديات العلاقات الخارجية، 1894-1912. Dār Abī Raqrāq lil-Ṭibāʻah wa-al-Nashr. LCCN 2010332729. OCLC 670240169.
- Fisher, John; Best, Antony, eds. (2011). "An Eagle Whose Wings Are Not Always Easy To Clip: Walter Burton Harris". On the Fringes of Diplomacy: Influences on British Foreign Policy, 1800–1945. Ashgate Publishing, Ltd. ISBN 9781409401193.
- Harris, Walter Burton (2002). Morocco That Was. Eland Books.
- Jeal, Tim (2007). Baden-Powell: Founder of the Boy Scouts. Yale University Press. ISBN 9780300125139.
- Zur Mühlen, Hermynia (2010). The End and the Beginning: The Book of My Life. Vol. 1. Open Book Publishers. ISBN 9781906924270.
