= Hildreth Glyn-Jones =

British barrister (1895–1980)

Sir Hildreth Glyn-Jones, TD (19 March 1895 – 30 April 1980) was a barrister, and High Court judge in the Queen's Bench Division from 1953 to 1968.

Glyn-Jones was the son of pharmacist Sir William Glyn-Jones (1869–1927), founder of the Proprietary Articles Trade Association in 1896, and Liberal MP for Stepney from 1910 until the constituency was abolished in 1918.

He was educated at the City of London School and qualified as a pharmacist before serving in the First World War. He was called to the bar at Middle Temple in January 1921.

He married Kathleen Melville in April 1921; they had three daughters. His practice as a barrister included both civil and criminal matters.

He served in the Middlesex Regiment and the Judge Advocate-General's Office in the Second World War. He became a King's Counsel in 1943 and was awarded the Territorial Decoration in 1950.

Glyn-Jones was leader of the Wales and Chester Circuit in 1944–45 and Recorder of Cardiff from 1945 to 1952. He was Deputy Chairman of the Berkshire Quarter Sessions from 1951 to 1962. He became a Commissioner of Assize on the Oxford Circuit and a Bencher at Middle Temple in 1952, and was appointed as a High Court judge in 1953, allocated to the Queen's Bench Division and receiving the customary knighthood. Among his notable cases as a judge were the Shepherd's Bush murders and the poisoner Louisa May Merrifield.

After he retired as a judge in 1968, he became a Fellow of the Royal Pharmaceutical Society in 1975.
