= John Charles Durant =

John Charles Durant (15 July 1846 – 14 December 1929) was an English printer and a Liberal politician.

Durant was born at Fordingbridge, Hampshire, the son of Christopher William Durant and his wife Sarah Coles. His father was an ironmonger of Epping, Essex. He was educated at British School, Fordingbridge, Hampshire. He began his career as a compositor and became a master printer He was a Liberal and a "Christian Socialist" with an interest in land reform. He was an original founder of the Land Nationalisation Society, of the Land Restoration League, of the People's League, and the Democrat newspaper. He authored pamphlets on land and social questions.

In the 1885 general election, Durant was elected Member of Parliament for Stepney but did not defend the seat in the 1886 general election.

Durant married Alice Johnson, of Ockley, Surrey in 1874. He died at the age of 83, having outlived his service in Parliament by 43 years.

Parliament of the United Kingdom
New constituency	Member of Parliament for Stepney; 1885 – 1886	Succeeded by Frederick Wootton Isaacson
