= 1907 Stepney by-election =

UK Parliamentary by-election

← 1906	10 May 1907	Jan. 1910 →

Candidate	Harris	Cooper
Party	Conservative	Lib-Lab
Popular vote	2,299	1,350
Percentage	63.0%	37.0%
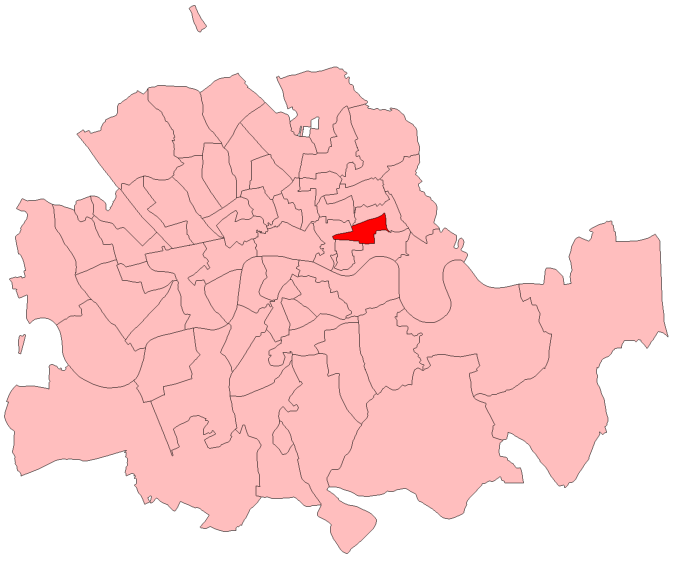
MP before election
William Evans-Gordon
Conservative
Subsequent MP
Leverton Harris
Conservative

The 1907 Stepney by-election was held on 10 May 1907. The by-election was held due to the resignation of the incumbent Conservative MP, William Evans-Gordon. It was won by the Conservative candidate Frederick Leverton Harris.

Stepney by-election, 1907
Party	Candidate	Votes	%	±%
Conservative	Frederick Leverton Harris	2,299	63.0	+5.7
Lib-Lab	Ben Cooper	1,350	37.0	−5.7
Majority		949	26.0	+11.4
Turnout		3,649	64.9	−19.0
Conservative hold		Swing	+5.7	
