= Stepney (UK Parliament constituency) =

Parliamentary constituency in the United Kingdom, 1950–1974

- Former borough constituency for the House of Commons

1885–1918
- Seats: one
- Created from: Tower Hamlets

1950–1974
- Seats: one
- Created from: Limehouse, Mile End and Whitechapel and St George's
- Replaced by: Stepney and Poplar

Stepney was a parliamentary constituency centred on the Stepney district of the East End of London. It returned one Member of Parliament (MP) to the House of Commons of the Parliament of the United Kingdom, elected by the first past the post system.

== History ==
The constituency existed for two separate periods:

- it was first created under the Redistribution of Seats Act 1885, for the 1885 general election, and abolished for the 1918 general election
- from the 1950 general election until its abolition for the February 1974 general election, when it was largely replaced by the new constituency of Stepney and Poplar.

== Boundaries ==
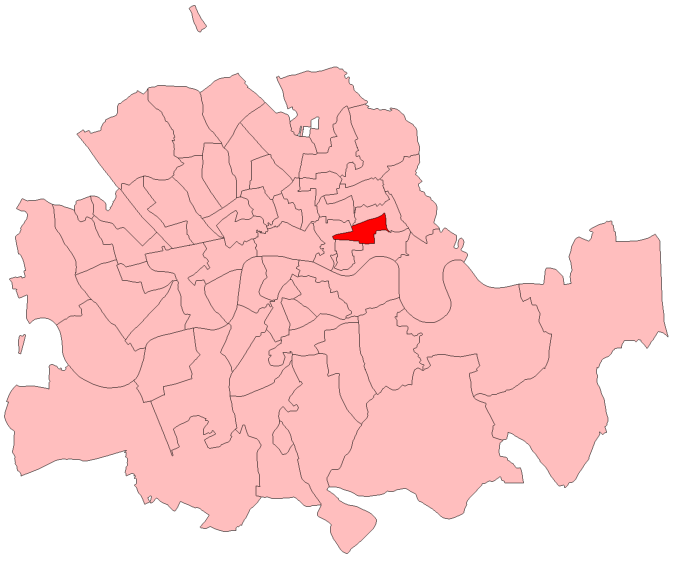
Stepney in the Metropolitan area, boundaries 1885–1918

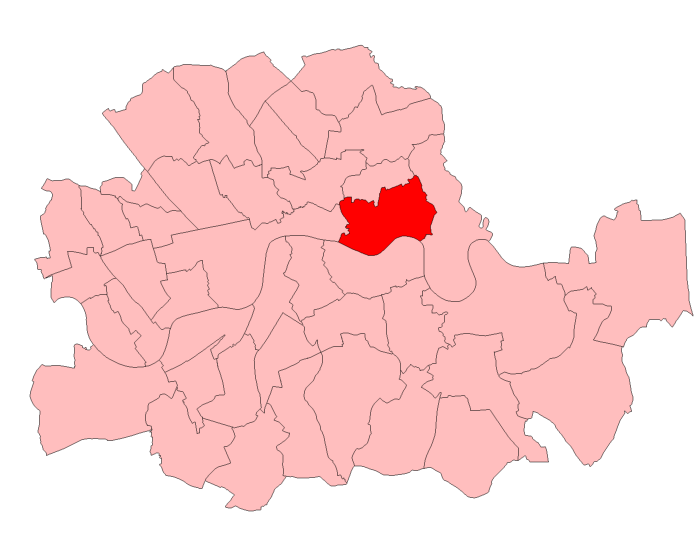
Stepney in the County of London, boundaries 1950–74

The constituency was first created in 1885, as a division of the parliamentary borough of Tower Hamlets, centred on the Stepney neighbourhood in the East End of London. The area was administered as part of the Tower division of the county of Middlesex.

In 1889 there were administrative changes. The territory of the constituency was severed from Middlesex and included in the new County of London. The lower tier of local government in the area continued to be administered by parish vestries and local boards of works.

In 1900 local government in London was rationalised. The Stepney Board of Works was abolished and the civil parish of Stepney became part of a larger Metropolitan Borough of Stepney.

In the redistribution of parliamentary seats in 1918, the Metropolitan Borough was divided between three constituencies - Limehouse, Mile End and Whitechapel and St George's. The previous Stepney constituency was abolished and largely replaced by Whitechapel and St George's.

In the next major redistribution of parliamentary seats, which took effect for the 1950 United Kingdom general election, the Stepney constituency was re-created. The 1950 version of the seat comprised the whole of the Metropolitan Borough of Stepney.

In 1965 Stepney became part of the London Borough of Tower Hamlets and Greater London. When parliamentary constituencies were next redistributed, for the February 1974 general election, the area was included in the Stepney and Poplar seat.

== Members of Parliament ==
=== MPs 1885–1918 ===
Election	Member	Party
1885	John Charles Durant	Liberal
1886	Frederick Wootton Isaacson	Conservative
1898	W. C. Steadman	Liberal
1900	William Evans-Gordon	Conservative
1907	Frederick Leverton Harris	Conservative
1910 Dec.	William Glyn-Jones	Liberal
1918	constituency abolished	

=== MPs 1950–1974 ===
Constituency re-established 1950

Election	Member	Party
1950	Walter Edwards	Labour
1964	Peter Shore	Labour
Feb 1974	constituency abolished	

== Elections ==
=== Elections in the 1970s ===
General election 1970: Stepney
Party	Candidate	Votes	%	±%
Labour	Peter Shore	18,993	74.8	−1.3
Conservative	Harry Greenway	4,922	19.4	+2.8
Communist	Solly Kaye	1,468	5.8	−1.5
Majority		14,071	55.4	−4.1
Turnout		25,383	44.9	−5.8
Labour hold		Swing		

=== Elections in the 1960s ===
General election 1966: Stepney
Party	Candidate	Votes	%	±%
Labour	Peter Shore	23,098	76.1	+4.7
Conservative	Beryl Phyllis Cooper	5,049	16.6	−4.1
Communist	Solly Kaye	2,209	7.3	−0.6
Majority		18,049	59.5	+8.8
Turnout		30,356	50.7	−0.6
Labour hold		Swing		

General election 1964: Stepney
Party	Candidate	Votes	%	±%
Labour	Peter Shore	22,184	71.4	+0.7
Conservative	Ian F Hay Davison	6,466	20.7	−1.9
Communist	Solly Kaye	2,454	7.9	+1.2
Majority		15,818	50.7	+2.5
Turnout		31,104	51.3	−7.9
Labour hold		Swing		

=== Elections in the 1950s ===
General election 1959: Stepney
Party	Candidate	Votes	%	±%
Labour	Walter Edwards	26,875	70.7	−2.3
Conservative	P Brian Calwell	8,566	22.6	+7.5
Communist	Solly Kaye	2,548	6.7	−0.9
Majority		18,309	48.2	−9.7
Turnout		37,989	59.4	+1.6
Labour hold		Swing		

General election 1955: Stepney
Party	Candidate	Votes	%	±%
Labour	Walter Edwards	27,677	73.0	−3.5
Conservative	Lillian F Sutton	5,733	15.1	−1.1
Communist	Solly Kaye	2,888	7.6	+0.3
Liberal	Fred Winckless	1,615	4.3	New
Majority		21,944	57.9	−2.4
Turnout		37,913	57.8	−13.1
Labour hold		Swing		

General election 1951: Stepney
Party	Candidate	Votes	%	±%
Labour	Walter Edwards	35,849	76.5	+6.5
Conservative	Martin Herbert Bernhard Solomon	7,586	16.2	+3.1
Communist	Ted Bramley	3,436	7.3	−5.2
Majority		28,263	60.3	+3.4
Turnout		46,871	70.9	−1.6
Labour hold		Swing		

General election 1950: Stepney
Party	Candidate	Votes	%	±%
Labour	Walter Edwards	33,475	70.0	
Conservative	Martin Herbert Bernhard Solomon	6,238	13.1	
Communist	Phil Piratin	5,991	12.5	
Liberal	John Henry Maynard	2,105	4.4	
Majority		27,237	56.9	
Turnout		47,809	72.5	
Labour win (new seat)				

=== Elections in the 1910s ===
WS Glyn-Jones

General election December 1910: Tower Hamlets, Stepney
Party	Candidate	Votes	%	±%
Liberal	William Glyn-Jones	1,926	51.5	+4.5
Conservative	Walter Preston	1,812	48.5	−4.5
Majority		114	3.0	N/A
Turnout		3,738	80.3	−4.9
Registered electors		4,653		
Liberal gain from Conservative		Swing	+4.5	

General election January 1910: Tower Hamlets, Stepney
Party	Candidate	Votes	%	±%
Conservative	Frederick Leverton Harris	2,102	53.0	−4.3
Liberal	William Glyn-Jones	1,861	47.0	+4.3
Majority		241	6.0	−8.6
Turnout		3,963	85.2	+1.3
Registered electors		4,653		
Conservative hold		Swing	−4.3	

=== Elections in the 1900s ===
1907 Stepney by-election
Party	Candidate	Votes	%	±%
Conservative	Frederick Leverton Harris	2,299	63.0	+5.7
Lib-Lab	Ben Cooper	1,350	37.0	−5.7
Majority		949	26.0	+11.4
Turnout		3,649	64.9	−19.0
Registered electors		5,621		
Conservative hold		Swing	+5.7	

General election 1906: Tower Hamlets, Stepney
Party	Candidate	Votes	%	±%
Conservative	William Evans-Gordon	2,490	57.3	−4.5
Liberal	Durham Stokes	1,853	42.7	+4.5
Majority		637	14.6	−9.0
Turnout		4,343	83.9	+7.3
Registered electors		5,176		
Conservative hold		Swing	-4.5	

General election 1900: Tower Hamlets, Stepney
Party	Candidate	Votes	%	±%
Conservative	William Evans-Gordon	2,783	61.8	+6.2
Lib-Lab	W. C. Steadman	1,718	38.2	−6.2
Majority		1,065	23.6	+12.4
Turnout		4,501	76.6	+6.8
Registered electors		5,878		
Conservative hold		Swing	+6.2	

=== Elections in the 1890s ===
Steadman

By-election, 9 Mar 1898: Tower Hamlets, Stepney
Party	Candidate	Votes	%	±%
Lib-Lab	W. C. Steadman	2,492	50.2	+5.8
Conservative	William Evans-Gordon	2,472	49.8	−5.8
Majority		20	0.4	N/A
Turnout		4,964	77.7	+7.9
Registered electors		6,387		
Lib-Lab gain from Conservative		Swing	+5.8	

Dickinson

General election 1895: Tower Hamlets, Stepney
Party	Candidate	Votes	%	±%
Conservative	Frederick Isaacson	2,346	55.6	+4.6
Liberal	Willoughby Dickinson	1,876	44.4	−4.6
Majority		470	11.2	+9.2
Turnout		4,222	69.8	−4.3
Registered electors		6,048		
Conservative hold		Swing	+4.6	

Isaacson

General election 1892: Tower Hamlets, Stepney
Party	Candidate	Votes	%	±%
Conservative	Frederick Isaacson	2,292	51.0	−5.3
Liberal	Benjamin Thomas Lindsay Thomson	2,203	49.0	+5.3
Majority		89	2.0	−10.6
Turnout		4,495	74.1	+16.7
Registered electors		6,069		
Conservative hold		Swing	-5.3	

=== Elections in the 1880s ===
General election 1886: Tower Hamlets, Stepney
Party	Candidate	Votes	%	±%
Conservative	Frederick Isaacson	2,237	56.3	+6.4
Liberal	Robert Samuel Wright	1,735	43.7	−6.4
Majority		502	12.6	N/A
Turnout		3,972	57.4	−1.5
Registered electors		6,925		
Conservative gain from Liberal		Swing	+6.6	

General election 1885: Tower Hamlets, Stepney
Party	Candidate	Votes	%	±%
Liberal	John Durant	2,045	50.1	
Conservative	Frederick Isaacson	2,035	49.9	
Majority		10	0.2	
Turnout		4,080	58.9	
Registered electors		6,925		
Liberal win (new seat)				

The initial count for this election had Durant on 2,141 votes and Isaacson on 2,119 votes; a re-count then led to Durant on 2,052 votes and Isaacson on 2,051 votes. Further scrutiny then led to the above results.
