= William Glyn-Jones =

Sir William Samuel Glyn-Jones
- William Samuel Glyn-Jones
- Born: 1869; Worcester, England
- Died: 9 September 1927 (aged 57–58); Vancouver, Canada
- Education: Merthyr Tydfil Grammar School
- Occupations: Barrister, politician & pharmacist
- Spouse: Mary Evans (m. 1894)
- Children: 4
- Father: George Griffith Jones
- Relatives: Hildreth Glyn-Jones (son); John Glyn-Jones (son)

Sir William Samuel Glyn-Jones (1869 – 9 September 1927) was a British Liberal Party politician and pharmacist.

== Background ==
He was born to Welsh parents in Worcester in 1869, the son of George Griffith Jones. He was educated at Merthyr Tydfil Grammar School. He married in 1894, Mary Evans of Tower Hill, Llanybydder, Carmarthen. They had two sons and two daughters. His eldest son, Hildreth Glyn-Jones, became an eminent barrister and High Court judge. His younger son, John, was an actor.

== Career ==
He was Called to Bar, Middle Temple in 1904. He was appointed an Alderman to Middlesex County Council. Standing for the first time, he fought the January 1910 General Election as Liberal candidate for Stepney, coming second. He served as Liberal member of parliament for Stepney from December 1910–18. He gained the seat from the Conservatives at the December 1910 General Election. When his constituency was abolished in 1918 he decided to retire from parliament.

He was knighted in 1919. He served as a justice of the peace for Middlesex. He was a Pharmacist. He was Secretary to the Royal Pharmaceutical Society of Great Britain from 1918 to 1926. He had published The Law of Poisons and Pharmacy in 1909. He was Chairman of the Council of the Proprietary Articles Trade Association, and since 1926 of the Canadian Proprietary Articles Trade Association.

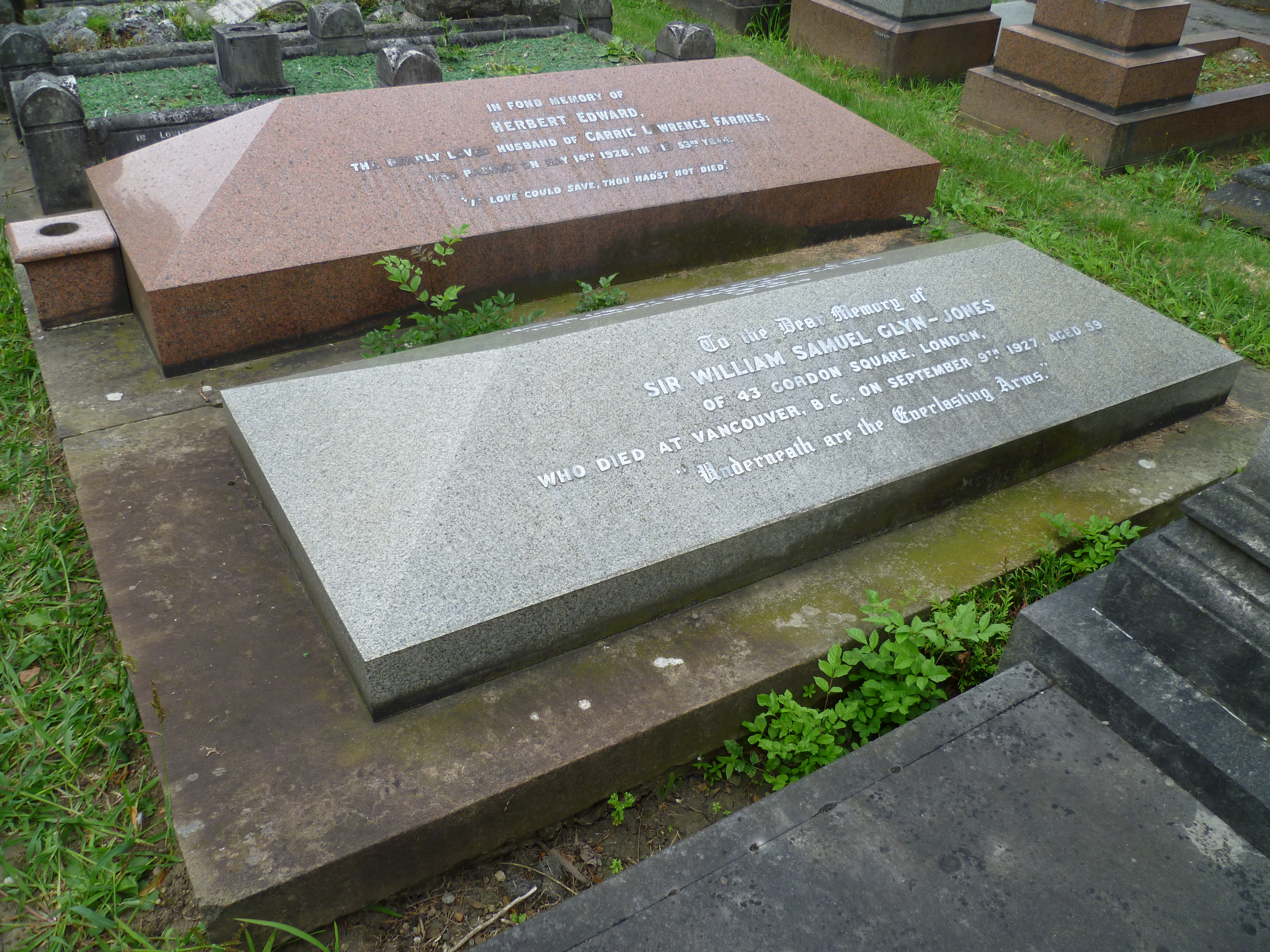
The grave of William Samuel Glyn-Jones in Southgate Cemetery

He died in Vancouver after a month-long illness.

Parliament of the United Kingdom
| Preceded by Frederick Leverton Harris | Member of Parliament for Stepney; December 1910–1918 | Constituency abolished |
