= Leverton Harris =

British politician (1864–1926)

Leverton Harris PC
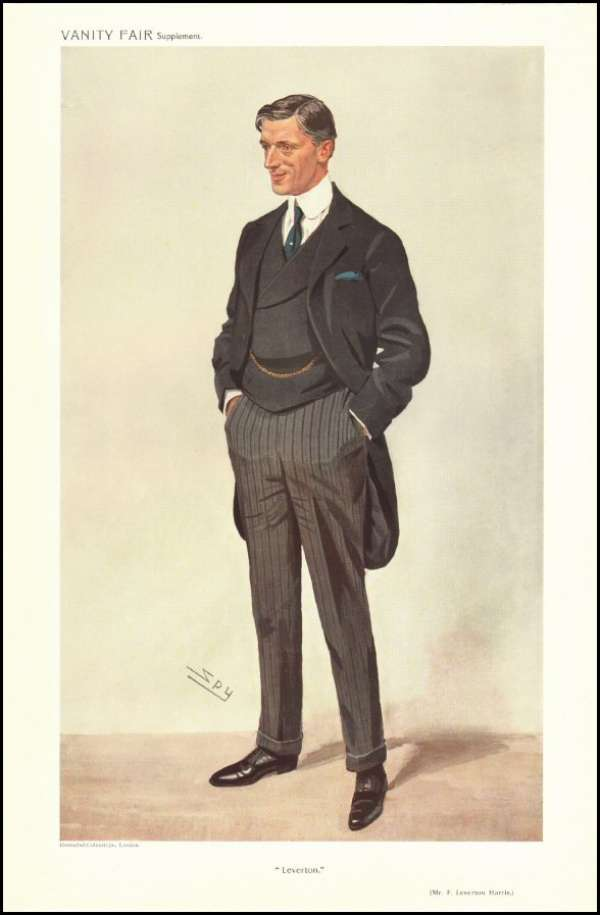
- Men of the Day No.1206: Caricature of The Rt Hon Frederick Leverton Harris MP. Family came from Hampshire. Educated Winchester and Cambridge. MP for Tynemouth in 1900.

Parliamentary Secretary to the Ministry of Blockade
- In office 22 December 1916 – 14 December 1918
- Prime Minister: David Lloyd George
- Preceded by: Office created
- Succeeded by: Office abolished

Member of Parliament for East Worcestershire
- In office 16 July 1914 – 14 December 1918
- Preceded by: Austen Chamberlain
- Succeeded by: Hallewell Rogers (Birmingham Moseley)

Member of Parliament for Stepney
- In office 10 May 1907 – 19 December 1910
- Preceded by: William Evans-Gordon
- Succeeded by: William Glyn-Jones

Member of Parliament for Tynemouth
- In office 24 October 1900 – 8 February 1906
- Preceded by: Richard Donkin
- Succeeded by: Herbert Craig

Personal details
- Born: Frederick Leverton Harris; 17 December 1864
- Died: 14 November 1926 (aged 61) Grosvenor Street, London, UK
- Party: Conservative
- Spouse: Gertrude Richardson
- Parents: Frederick Harris (father); Elizabeth Wylie (mother)
- Relatives: Austin Edward Harris (brother); Walter Burton Harris (brother); Clement Harris (brother)
- Education: Winchester College
- Alma mater: Caius College, Cambridge

Frederick Leverton Harris (17 December 1864 – 14 November 1926) was a British businessman and Conservative Party politician. He sat in the House of Commons for three periods between 1900 and 1918.

His role in Parliament was largely insignificant until World War I, when he used his knowledge of shipping to play a crucial role in the United Kingdom's economic warfare against the German Empire, and joined the government in 1916 in a newly created post with specific responsibility for the blockade of Germany. As the war drew to a close, his political career looked set to flourish, but was destroyed by scandal.

== Early life and career ==
Harris was the son of Frederick William Harris and his wife Elizabeth née Wylie, of London and Withyham, East Sussex. His siblings included Sir Austin Edward Harris, who became a noted banker, Walter Burton Harris, a journalist, writer, traveller and socialite who achieved fame for his writings on Morocco and pianist and composer Clement Harris, who was killed in the Greco-Turkish War of 1897.

He was educated at Winchester College and then Caius College, Cambridge, where he graduated in 1884. The following year he became a partner in coal-factoring and ship-owning business of Harris & Dixon in London, and he later became a director of the National Discount Company and the Metropolitan Electricity Supply Company.

In 1886, he married Gertrude Richardson, from Bessbrook, County Armagh. They had no children.

== Political career ==
He was elected at the 1900 general election as the Member of Parliament (MP) Member of Parliament for Tynemouth, and supported the tariff reform campaign of his friend Joseph Chamberlain. He was appointed to the Tariff Reform Commission. In October 1902 he was appointed Parliamentary private secretary (unpaid) to H. O. Arnold-Forster, Parliamentary and Financial Secretary to the Admiralty.

He was defeated at the 1906 election, but in May 1907 he was selected as the Unionist candidate for a vacancy in the Stepney division of Tower Hamlets, in London, following the resignation of Sir William Evans-Gordon.

At the by-election on 10 May, he won the seat in a two-way contest with a Liberal-Labour candidate, Ben Cooper, Secretary of the Cigar Makers' Union. In the same year he was elected as a Municipal Reform Party candidate to the London County Council for Stepney, and was returned to Parliament by Stepney in January 1910.

For health reasons, he did not defend his seat in December 1910, but he returned to Parliament 4 years later. After the death of his friend Joseph Chamberlain, his son Austen Chamberlain (whose first son was Harris's godson) resigned his East Worcestershire seat to contest his father's old seat of Birmingham West. Harris contested and won the resulting East Worcestershire by-election on 16 July, just weeks before the outbreak of World War I. He then became a commercial adviser to the trade division of the Admiralty, and in 1916 moved to the Foreign Office as Director of the Restriction of Enemy Supplies Department. He became a privy councillor in January, and in December he joined the government as Parliamentary Secretary to the Ministry of Blockade.

The East Worcestershire constituency was to be abolished for the 1918 general election, and Harris had been selected as the Conservative candidate for the new Moseley division of Birmingham. However, he and his wife faced public criticism for their role in wartime. During the war, she had visited Baron Leopold von Plessen, who was interned as an alien. Von Plessen was of British-Austrian dual nationality, and his mother was a friend of Mrs Harris. She strongly denied allegations that she had ever carried him parcels or letters for him, and was supported by Austen Chamberlain, who also defended her husband against suggestions that his business had profited from his role in government. However, Harris feared that the election would be fought on personal grounds, and on 16 October he withdrew his candidacy. When the war ended he withdrew from public life.

== Retirement ==
Harris had lived at Camilla Lacey near Dorking in Surrey, but the house burned down in 1914. In about 1920 he took up painting, and in 1925 exhibited 50 oil paintings at the Goupil Gallery.

He died suddenly on 14 November 1926 at his home in Grosvenor Street, London, aged 61.

Parliament of the United Kingdom
Preceded by Richard Donkin	Member of Parliament for Tynemouth; 1900 – 1906	Succeeded by Herbert James Craig
Preceded by William Evans-Gordon	Member of Parliament for Stepney; 1907 – December 1910	Succeeded by William Glyn-Jones
Preceded by Austen Chamberlain	Member of Parliament for East Worcestershire; 1914 – 1918	Constituency abolished
