= Thomas Kirby-Green =

Squadron Leader Thomas Kirby-Green
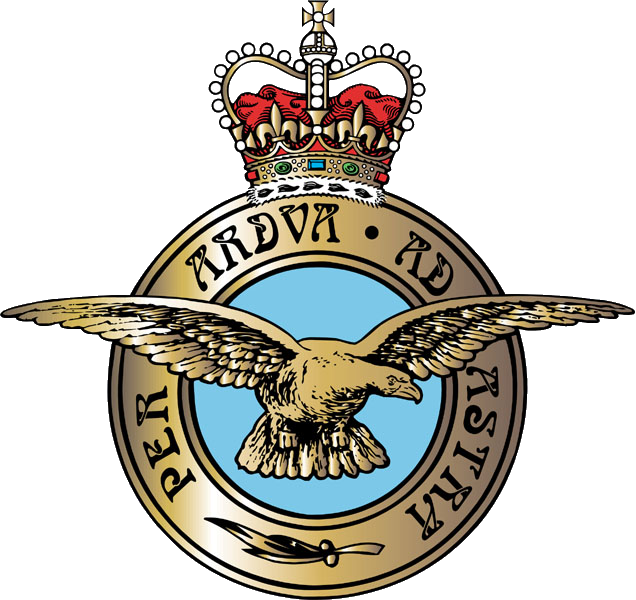
- Born: Thomas Gresham Kirby-Green; 27 February 1918; Dowa, Nyasaland
- Died: 29 March 1944 (aged 26); Ostrava, Czechoslovakia
- Burial place: Poznan Old Garrison Cemetery, Poland
- Relatives: Maria Dorothea Diane (wife)
- Military career
- Allegiance: United Kingdom
- Branch: Royal Air Force
- Service years: 1936–1944
- Rank: Squadron leader
- Nickname: "Tom"
- Service number: 39103
- Unit: No. 40 Squadron RAF
- Conflicts: World War II; Channel Front (POW)
- Awards: Mentioned in Despatches (twice)

Thomas Gresham Kirby-Green (27 February 1918 – 29 March 1944) was a British Royal Air Force officer, the pilot of a Vickers Wellington bomber, who was taken prisoner during the Second World War. He took part in the 'Great Escape' from Stalag Luft III in March 1944, but was one of the men recaptured and subsequently executed by the Gestapo.

== Pre-war life ==
Kirby-Green was born in Dowa, Nyasaland where his father Sir William Kirby-Green was the British District Governor. His father was upcountry at the time of his birth and found a baby abandoned in the bush at the same time as his son was born. He rescued the child, named him "Putti" and brought him up as another son. After growing up in Africa, Kirby-Green was sent to boarding school in England at Dover College where he became a house prefect and a member of the rugby team. On leaving school in 1935 he lived with his parents in Tangier and gained a private pilot's licence prior to joining the Royal Air Force. Kirby-Green was commissioned on 24 August 1936, he trained as a service pilot at No. 8 Flying Training School Montrose and joined No. 216 Squadron RAF flying transport aircraft in Egypt from 27 May 1937 before being confirmed as a pilot officer on 29 June 1937. During this period he regularly sailed to Tangier to visit his parents whilst on leave.

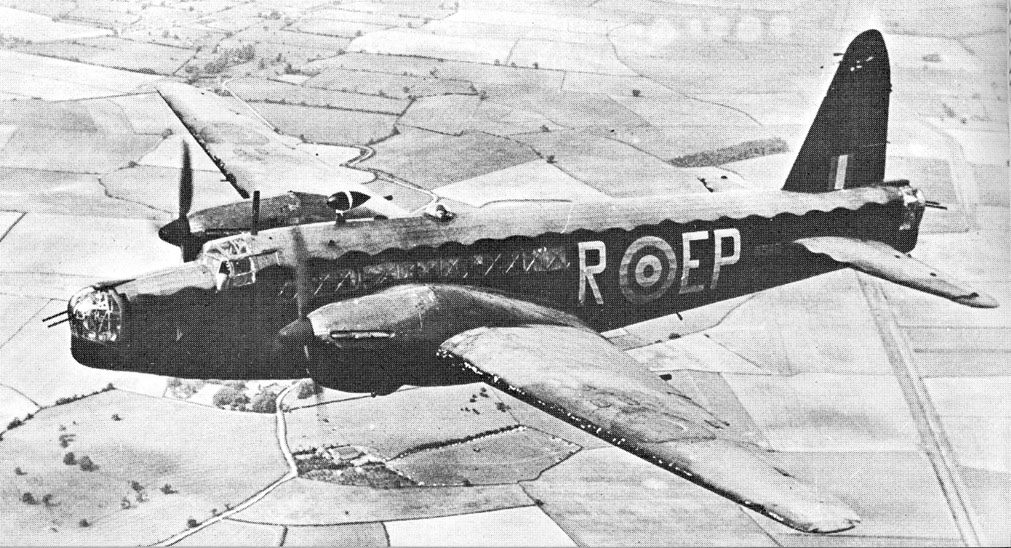
The Merlin-engined Wellington Mark II. This aircraft belongs to No. 104 Sqn.

In January 1938 he was transferred to No. 99 Squadron RAF at RAF Mildenhall and with the squadron converted to the new Vickers Wellington bomber later that year. During 1938 he competed in the RAF Athletics Championships representing the base and competing against Ian Cross representing RAF Marham who would also be involved in the "Great Escape" in 1944. He was promoted flying officer on 29 January 1939.

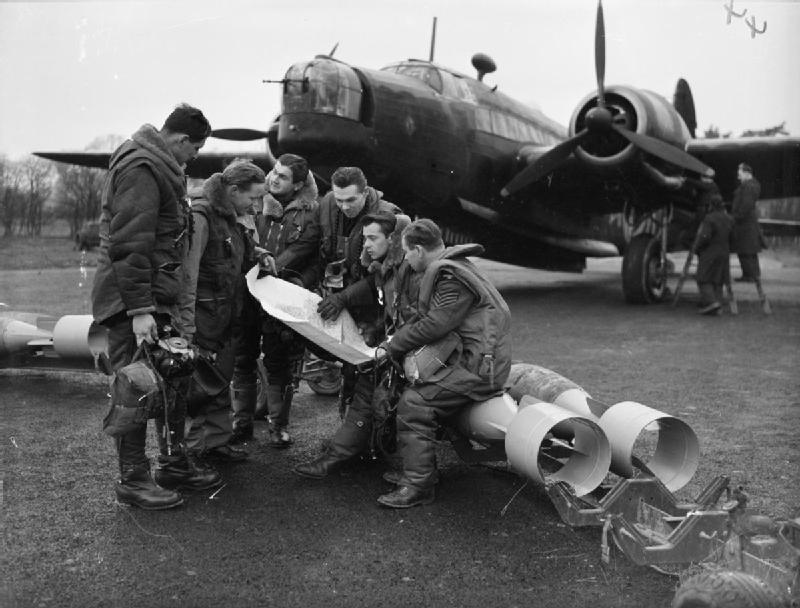
311 Squadron flight crew with their Wellington bomber at RAF East Wretham

== War service ==
In January 1940, after completing a gunnery course, he joined No. 9 Squadron RAF to fly Vickers Wellingtons operationally from RAF Honington and by the end of July 1940 he had completed 27 operations. That September he was rested and posted to the newly formed No. 311 Squadron RAF a Czech squadron, as a flight instructor. He always wore Czech insignia on his RAF uniform to honour his Czech friends. Kirby-Green was promoted flight lieutenant on 3 September 1940. Near the end of 1940 he married Maria Dorothea Diane Hayman in south-west London and they set up home at Hamerton near Huntingdon. In September 1941 he completed a highly successful instructional tour with the Czechs being posted away to No. 40 Squadron RAF for a second tour of ops. His commanding officer was "Pick" Pickard DSO DFC. On 10 September 1941 he participated in a bombing attack on Turin, Italy and was the only pilot of the squadron to reach and bomb the target due to the terrible weather conditions. He was promoted acting squadron leader and flight commander and received a Mention in Despatches.

== Prisoner of war ==
At 01:06 hours on the morning of 17 October 1941 he took off from RAF Alconbury on his 37th operation flying a Wellington Mark Ic bomber (serial number "Z8862", squadron codes BL-B) to bomb factories in Duisburg but Kirby-Green's aircraft was shot down. All of the rest of the crew were killed and Kirby-Green became a prisoner of war. Percy Pickard flew down to break the news to his wife and said that he was sure that Kirby-Green would be a prisoner of war and then on 16 November 1941 William Joyce, Lord Haw Haw the American born Irish-British Nazi collaborator broadcasting from Berlin made specific reference to the capture of Squadron Leader Kirby-Green. By this time he had passed through interrogation camp at Dulag Luft and was in Stalag Luft I at Barth where he was a colourful and noisy character. As a prisoner of war Kirby-Green received exotic parcels from family in Tangier with fruits, nuts, gramophone records of Latin music and bright clothing. He and Johnny Stower gave classes teaching the Spanish language. After transfer to Stalag Luft III he became more closely associated with Roger Bushell who was Big-X running the escape activities. Bushell recruited him as the senior security officer for the escape committee. He became Big-S and introduced a "duty-pilot" scheme which involved maintaining a watch on all German activities. He was also an enthusiastic tunneller, and collated all available information on Spain, anything which might assist an escaper heading for that frontier.

== 'Great Escape' ==
The original escape plan teamed Gordon Kidder up with Dick Churchill to travel posing as Romanian woodcutters, but after Churchill was removed to another camp, Kidder was paired with deeply sun-tanned Tom Kirby-Green, who had been in charge of security for organizer Roger Bushells "escape committee"; they would instead pose as Spanish labourers. Despite Kirby-Green being buried by a cave-in in the tunnel, he and Kidder were among the first 24 from the total of 76 men who escaped the prison camp on the night of 24–25 March 1944, in the escape now known as "the Great Escape". The pair cleared the tunnel exit before the alarm was sounded and made it to the local railway station, where they were almost exposed when questioned by a female member of the prison camp censor staff. She involved a policeman, who was convinced by their mixture of Spanish and broken German and let them go.

Memorial to "The Fifty" down the road toward Żagań (Kirby-Green is on the right)

Nationalities of the 50 executed
(United Kingdom) 21 British
(Canada) 6 Canadian
(Poland) 6 Polish
(Australia) 5 Australian
(South Africa) 3 South African
(New Zealand) 2 New Zealanders
(Norway) 2 Norwegian
(Belgium) 1 Belgian
(Czechoslovakia) 1 Czechoslovak
(France) 1 Frenchman
(Greece) 1 Greek
(Lithuania) 1 Lithuanian

They boarded the train for Breslau, where they then changed trains for Czechoslovakia, hoping for a further connection to Yugoslavia or Hungary where Kirby-Green had friends but after crossing the border they were recaptured at Hodonín in southern Moravia (close to the Austrian frontier) on 28 March 1944. While held at Zlín prison they were interrogated under torture. The two escapees were taken away by the Zlín Gestapo in two cars which headed out onto the Breslau road, and were shot near Moravská Ostrava (today part of Ostrava), their bodies being cremated in the local crematorium there. Urns returned to Stalag Luft III were marked with the date 29 March 1944 and the name of the town Mahrisch.

Kirby-Green was one of the 50 escapers murdered by the Gestapo. Originally his remains were buried at Sagan. He is now buried in part of the Poznan Old Garrison Cemetery. At the Anglican St Andrew's Church in Tangier, there is a memorial to him.

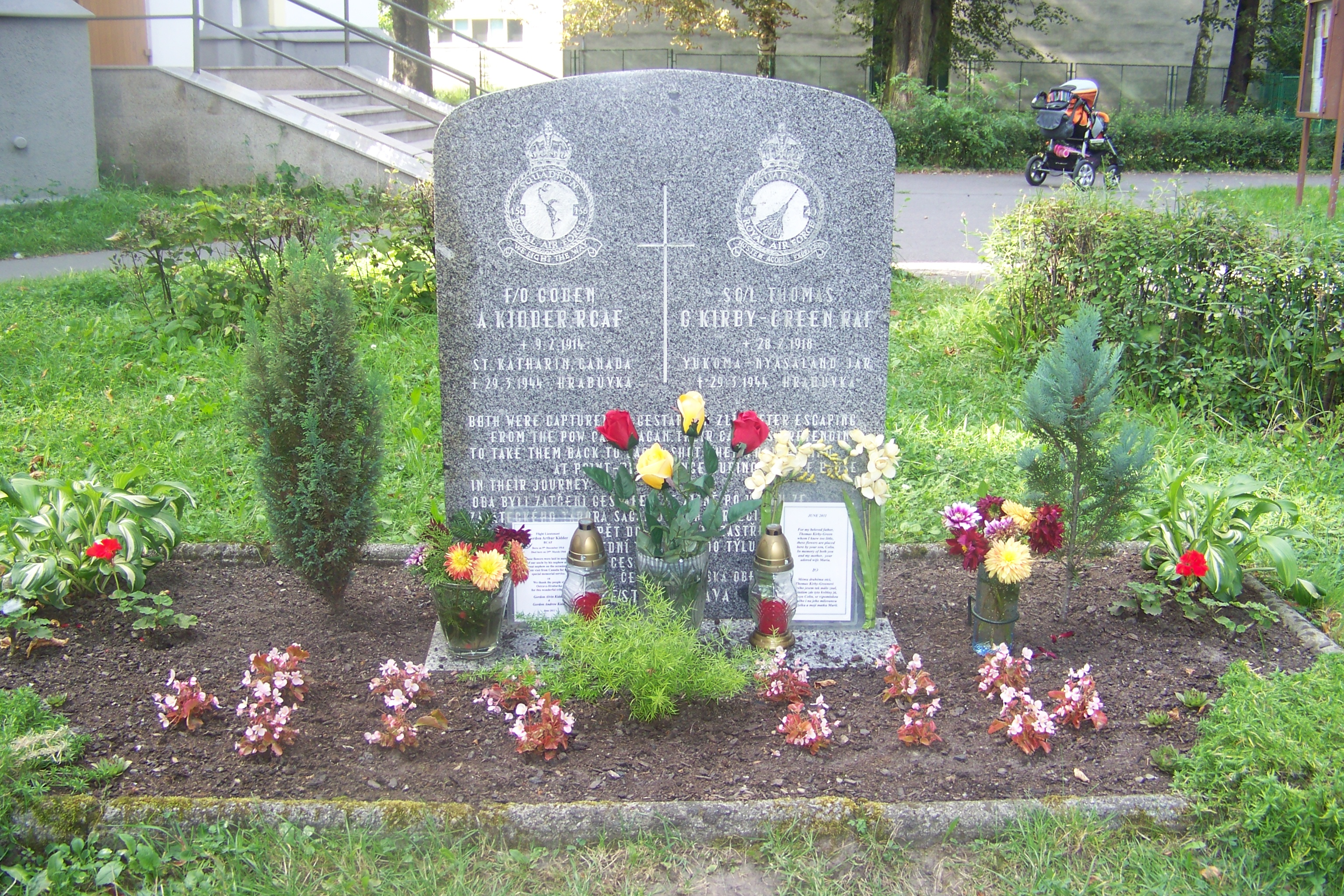
RAF memorial in Hrabůvka

Post-war Czech investigators identified the participants in the murders of Kirby-Green and Gordon Kidder at Hrabuvka, part of Ostrava, and notified their British opposite numbers on 2 December 1945.

Kirby-Green's name was amongst those in the list of murdered prisoners which was published when news broke on or about 19–20 May 1944. The Glasgow Herald of 19 May 1944 published an early list naming several officers including Kirby-Green. Post-war investigations saw a number of those guilty of the murders tracked down, arrested and tried for their crimes.

== Awards ==
- Mentioned in Despatches for tenacity and devotion to duty in The London Gazette on 23 September 1941.
- Mentioned in Despatches for conspicuous gallantry as a prisoner of war (none of the other relevant decorations then available could be awarded posthumously). It was published in a supplement to The London Gazette on 8 June 1944.

== Bibliography ==
- Ted Barris (2014). The Great Escape. Dundurn Publishing. ISBN 978-1459728448.
- Simon Read (2012). Human Game. Constable. ISBN 978-1-4721-1262-0.
- Sean Feast (2015). The Last of the 39-ers. Grub Street. ISBN 978-1909166158.
- Jonathan F Vance (2000). A Gallant Company. Pacifica Military. ISBN 978-0-935-55347-5.
- William Ash; Brendan Foley (2005). Under the Wire: The Wartime Memoir of a Spitfire Pilot, Legendary Escape Artist and 'cooler King'. Bantam. ISBN 978-0-593-05408-6.
- Paul Brickhill (2004). The Great Escape. W.W. Norton & Company. ISBN 978-0-393-32579-9.
- Alan Burgess (1990). The Longest Tunnel: The True Story of World War II's Great Escape. Naval Institute Press. ISBN 978-1-59114-097-9.
- Albert P. Clark (2005). 33 Months as a POW in Stalag Luft III: A World War II Airman Tells His Story. Fulcrum Pub. ISBN 978-1-55591-536-0.
- Arthur A. Durand (1 January 1989). Stalag Luft III: The Secret Story. Patrick Stephens Limited. ISBN 978-1-85260-248-2.
- William R Chorley (1992). RAF Bomber Command Losses, Volume 3. Midland Counties. ISBN 0-904597-89-X.
- Allen Andrews (1976). Exemplary Justice. Harrap. ISBN 0-245-52775-3.
- Vance, Jonathan F (2000). A Gallant Company: The Men of the Great Escape. Pacifica Military History; (Mar 2001). p. 41. ISBN 978-0-935-55347-5.
