= John Glyn-Jones =

British actor (1908–1997)

- Glyn-Jones in Smokescreen (1964)
- Born: 28 August 1908; London, England
- Died: 21 January 1997 (aged 88); Casablanca, Morocco
- Education: Bishop's Stortford College; University of Oxford
- Occupations: Actor; producer; director
- Years active: 1938-1976
- Father: William Glyn-Jones

John Glyn-Jones (28 August 1908 – 21 January 1997) was a British stage, radio, television and film actor.

His father, William Glyn-Jones, was a Member of Parliament and he was educated at Bishop's Stortford College and Oxford University. He began his acting career in repertory theatre in Oxford and with the BBC Drama Repertory Company, with whom he played Organ Morgan in the original recording of Under Milk Wood in 1954. As well as acting he was also a producer and director for the BBC, during 1947–1951.

On television he appeared in 1960 in an episode of the Patrick McGoohan Danger Man series entitled "The Gallows Tree" as Hamish. Also he appeared in 1966 in an episode of The Avengers entitled "A Sense of History" as the archivist Grindley (ending up deceased with an arrow in his back on a classroom floor).

In the 1960s, he bought St Margaret's Mill, Fleggburgh, a drainage mill, which he had converted to residential use.

== Selected filmography ==
- Save a Little Sunshine (1938) - Impressionist (uncredited)
- Inspector Hornleigh (1939) - Alfred (uncredited)
- They Came by Night (1940) - Llewellyn Jones
- The Proud Valley (1940) - Mr. Howes - Collector (uncredited)
- Convoy (1940) - Mate
- Sailors Three (1940) - Best Man
- Vice Versa (1948) - Bindabun Doss
- The Long Memory (1952) - Gedge
- Valley of Song (1953) - Ebenezer Davies
- The Final Test (1953) - Mr. Willis
- The Heart of the Matter (1953) - Harris (uncredited)
- A Day to Remember (1953) - Mr. Mitchell (uncredited)
- The Love Lottery (1954) - Prince Boris
- Carrington V.C. (1954) - Reporter - Evans
- Value for Money (1955) - Arkwright
- The Truth About Women (1957) - Raven
- Heart of a Child (1958) - Priest
- The Adventures of Hal 5 (1958) - Mr. Goorlie
- Carlton-Browne of the F.O. (1959) - Newsreel Interviewer
- Web of Evidence (1959) - Magistrate
- I'm All Right Jack (1959) - Detto Executive
- Two-Way Stretch (1960) - Lawyer
- Man in the Moon (1960) - Dr. Wilmot
- The Sinister Man (1961) - Dr. Maurice Tarn
- Locker Sixty-Nine (1962) - Insp. Roon
- Go to Blazes (1962) - Fire Chief
- Waltz of the Toreadors (1962) - Jenkins the Innkeeper
- Heavens Above! (1963) - Professor (uncredited)
- The Yellow Teddy Bears (1963) - Benny Wintle
- Smokescreen (1964) - Player
- The Verdict (1964) - Harry
- Decline and Fall... of a Birdwatcher (1968) - Warden
- Nobody Ordered Love (1972) - Harry
- Dark Places (1973) - Bank Manager
- The Copter Kids (1976) - Mr. Davidson (final film role)
