= National Cigar and Tobacco Workers' Union =

Former trade union of the United Kingdom

The National Cigar and Tobacco Workers' Union was a trade union representing tobacco workers in the United Kingdom.

The union was founded in 1918 when the Female Cigar Makers' Protection Union merged with the Cigar Makers' Mutual Association, the Cigar Sorters' and Bundlers' Mutual Association (London), and the Tobacco Strippers' Mutual Society. The merger took place on the initiative of Ben Cooper, leader of the Cigar Makers', but he was soon replaced by Alf Santen, who led the union almost throughout its existence.

By 1939, the union had 3,000 members, most of whom were women. In 1946, it merged into the Tobacco Workers' Union.

== General Secretaries ==
1918: Ben Cooper
1919: Alf Santen
1945: E. Lemon
