= Frederick Wootton Isaacson =

Isaacson in 1895

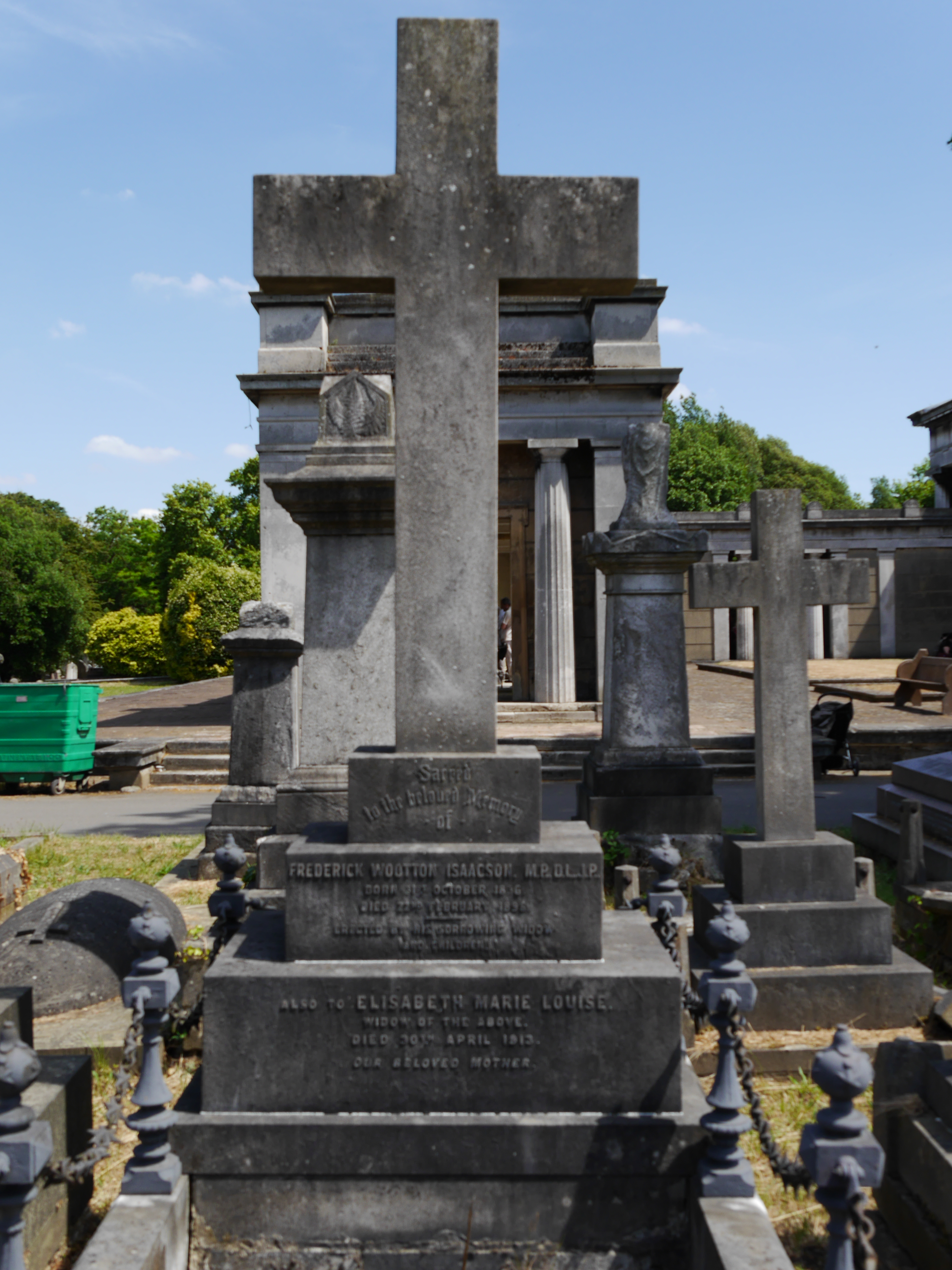
Monument, Kensal Green Cemetery

Frederick Wootton Isaacson (1836-22 February 1898) was an English businessman and Conservative politician.

Born in Mildenhall, Suffolk, he was the son of Frederick Isaacson and Emma Elizabeth née Case. In 1857 he married Elizabeth Marie Louise Jaeger, only daughter of Stephen Jaeger, a banker from Frankfurt, Germany.They had two children: Frederick John Francis Wootton Isaacson (1858–1948) and Violet Marie Louise Wootton Isaacson (1861–1949).

Isaacson initially made a living by the importing of silk. His wife established a millinery business on Regent Street as "Madame Elise", which was subsequently converted into a limited company. He later made a living from imports from the West Indies.

He was a Fellow of the Royal Geographical Society and of the Royal Society of Literature.

He described himself as a "Progressive Conservative" in politics and in 1880 put himself forward as a candidate for the constituency of Wednesbury, but withdrew before the poll took place. At the 1885 general election he narrowly failed to win the parliamentary seat of Stepney by 22 votes. In the following year another election was held, and he was elected as Stepney's member of parliament with a majority of 502 over his Liberal Party opponent. At the 1892 general election he held the seat with the narrow majority of 89 votes, but increased this to 470 votes in 1895.

He was a justice of the peace and deputy lieutenant for the County of London. He was also a magistrate in Monmouthshire, where he was chairman of the Nantyglo and Blaina Iron and Coal Company.

He died from influenza and pneumonia at his London residence in Upper Grosvenor Street, aged 61. He was buried at Kensal Green Cemetery.

Parliament of the United Kingdom
Preceded by John Charles Durant	Member of Parliament for Stepney; 1886–1898	Succeeded by William Charles Steadman
