= Ben Cooper (politician) =

British politician and trade unionist

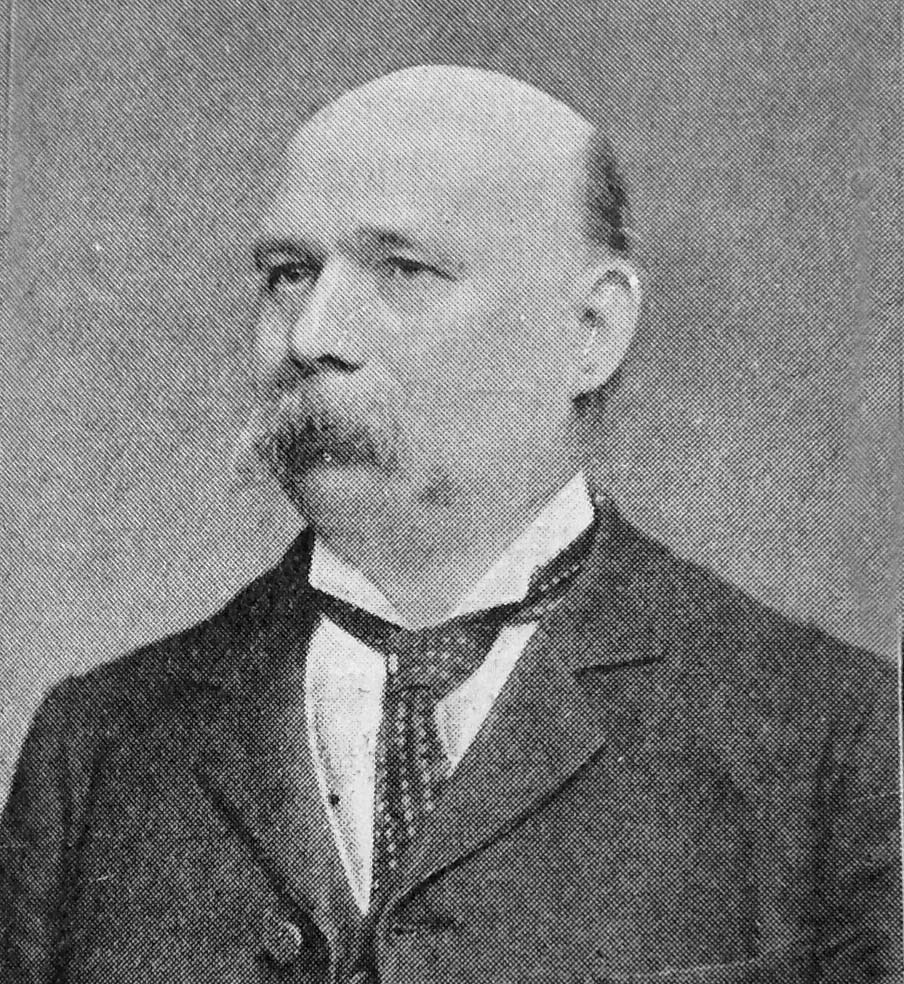
Cooper in 1895

Benjamin Cooper (1854 – January 1920) was a British politician and trade unionist.

Cooper was born and grew up in Norwich, where he completed an apprenticeship in cigar-making. He subsequently moved to London, where he became active in the Cigar Makers' Mutual Association.

Cooper was soon elected as general secretary of his union. A supporter of New Unionism, around the start of the 1890s, he helped found unions for workers in bass-dressing, match-making, dock work, confectionery and stick manufacture, as well as a separate union for female cigar makers. At the 1892 London County Council election, he was elected as a Labour and Progressive Party candidate in Bow and Bromley.

Cooper's newfound prominence led to his election to the Parliamentary Committee of the Trades Union Congress, and he held his seat on the council for many years. He also served on the council of the General Federation of Trade Unions.

Cooper stood as a Liberal-Labour candidate in the 1907 Stepney by-election, but he was easily defeated by Frederick Leverton Harris.

In 1918, Cooper organised the merger of the Cigar Makers' Mutual Association with other small unions, to form the National Cigar and Tobacco Workers' Union. He became the first leader of the new union, but retired shortly afterwards, and died in January 1920.

Trade union offices
Preceded by John P. Walker	General Secretary of the Cigar Makers' Mutual Association; 1886–1918	Succeeded by Position abolished
Preceded by New position	General Secretary of the National Cigar and Tobacco Workers' Union; 1918–1919	Succeeded by Alf Santen
Preceded by George Courtenay	Chairman of the London Trades Council; 1896–1899	Succeeded by Joe Gregory
Preceded by W. C. Steadman	Treasurer of the London Trades Council; 1910s–1917	Succeeded by John Stokes
