= St Andrew's Church, Tangier =

St Andrew's Church
- Church of Saint Andrew
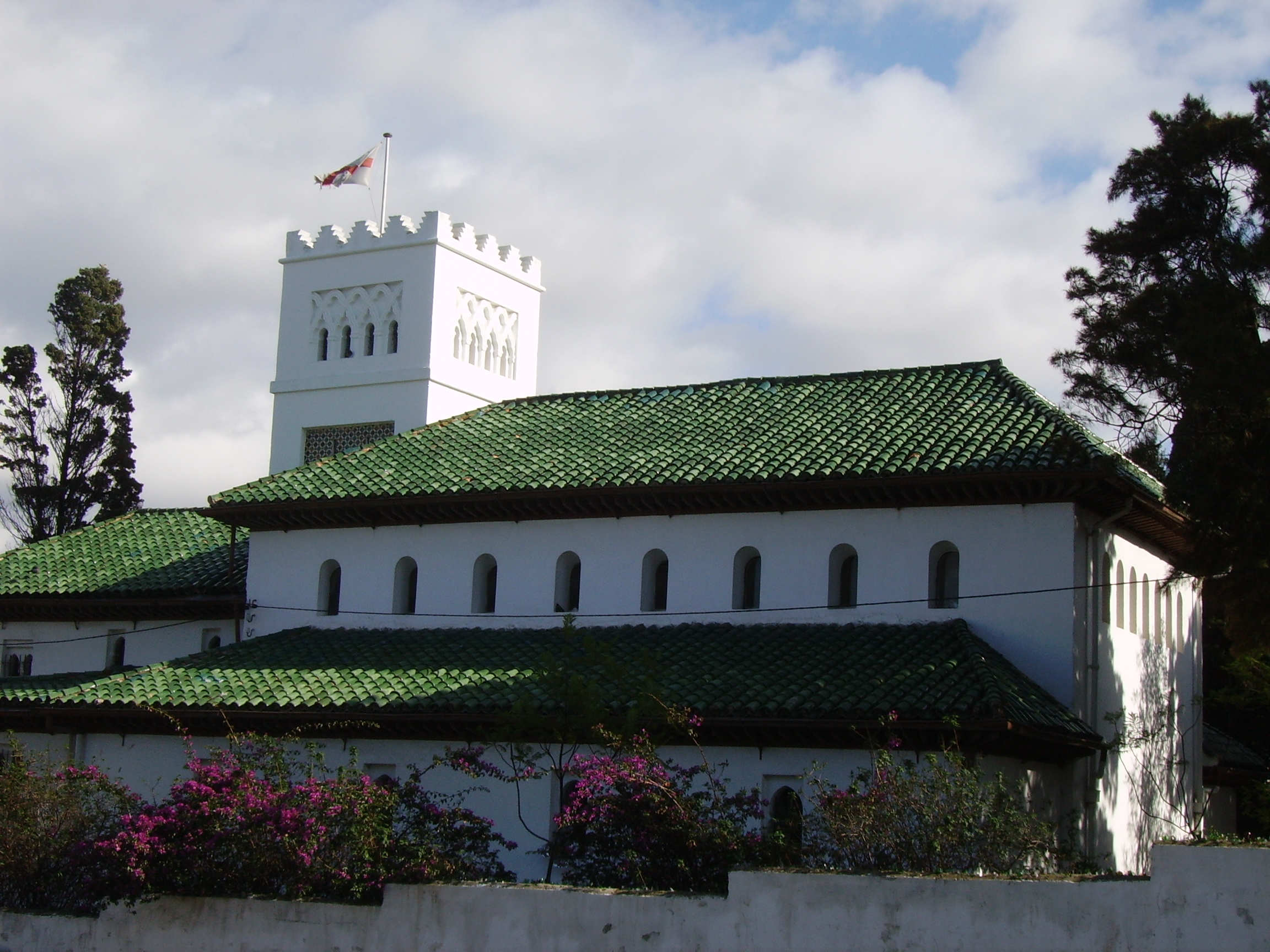
- Church of St. Andrew
- St Andrew's Church
- 35°47′05″N 5°49′23″W
- Address: Tangier
- Country: Morocco
- Denomination: Anglicanism

History
- Status: Church
- Dedication: Andrew the Apostle
- Consecrated: 1905

Architecture
- Functional status: Active
- Architectural type: Church
- Style: Moorish
- Completed: 1894

Administration
- Archdeaconry: Gibraltar

The Church of Saint Andrew is an Anglican church in Tangier, Morocco. Consecrated in 1905, the church is within the Archdeaconry of Gibraltar. The building is constructed in a Moorish architectural style.

== History ==
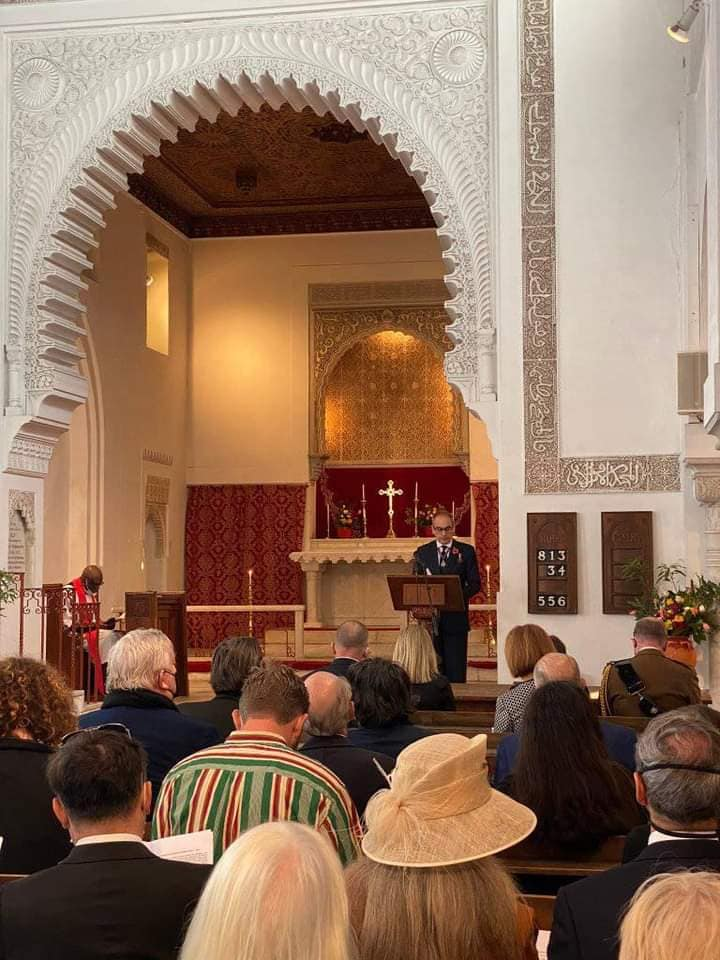
Moroccan Christians from Tangier.

In 1880, Hassan I of Morocco donated land to the British community in order to build a small Anglican church in Tangier. The resulting church was soon found to have insufficient capacity for the increasing number of worshippers, and a new building was constructed in 1894 which became the Church of Saint Andrew. It was consecrated in 1905. The interior is designed as a fusion of numerous styles, notably Moorish. The belltower, shaped like a minaret, overlooks the adjacent cemetery. Henri Matisse's 1913 painting Landscape Viewed from a Window depicts the church.

The church has a number of memorial plaques, including one to commemorate Emily Keene, (1849–1944), Sherifa of Wazzan, who introduced the smallpox vaccine to Morocco. She was a British humanitarian who married the Shareef of Ouazzane, a local religious leader. She died in Tangier and there is a plaque in the western side of the church to commemorate her - her actual grave is in the Wazzan family burial ground in the Marshan district of Tangier overlooking the Strait of Gibraltar. Another memorial commemorates Thomas Kirby-Green, one of the members of the Great Escape who was executed on recapture.

Administratively, the church is in the Archdeaconry of Gibraltar.

== Notable burials ==
The churchyard holds the graves of a number of notable people:

- Christopher Gibbs, (1938–2018), antique dealer and collector, credited with inventing Swinging London
- Walter Burton Harris, (1866–1933), a British diplomat, journalist and author
- Claire de Menasce and her second husband Commander Roy Howell RN. Claude-Marie Vincendon, her daughter by her first marriage, was the third wife of Lawrence Durrell
- Paul Lund, (1915–1966), British gangster and friend of William Burroughs
- Sir Harry MacLean, (1848–1920), soldier and commander of the Moroccan Army
