= 1898 Stepney by-election =

UK Parliamentary by-election

The 1898 Stepney by-election was held on 9 March 1898 following the death of the incumbent Conservative MP, Frederick Wootton Isaacson on 22 February 1898.

== Candidates ==
The Conservative Party candidate was William Evans-Gordon, a career diplomat in the British Raj who had retired as a political officer in 1897.

The Liberal Party candidate was W. C. Steadman. Steadman was the London County Council member for Stepney and had unsuccessfully fought Hammersmith in the 1895 general election.

Both candidates had fought Stepney at the London County Council election on 3 March 1898.

== Result ==
1898 Stepney by-election
Party	Candidate	Votes	%	±%
Lib-Lab	W. C. Steadman	2,492	50.2	+5.8
Conservative	William Evans-Gordon	2,472	49.8	−5.8
Majority		20	0.4	N/A
Turnout		4,964	77.7	+7.9
Lib-Lab gain from Conservative		Swing	+5.8	
