= Gordon Kidder =

Royal Canadian Air Force officer

Gordon Arthur Kidder
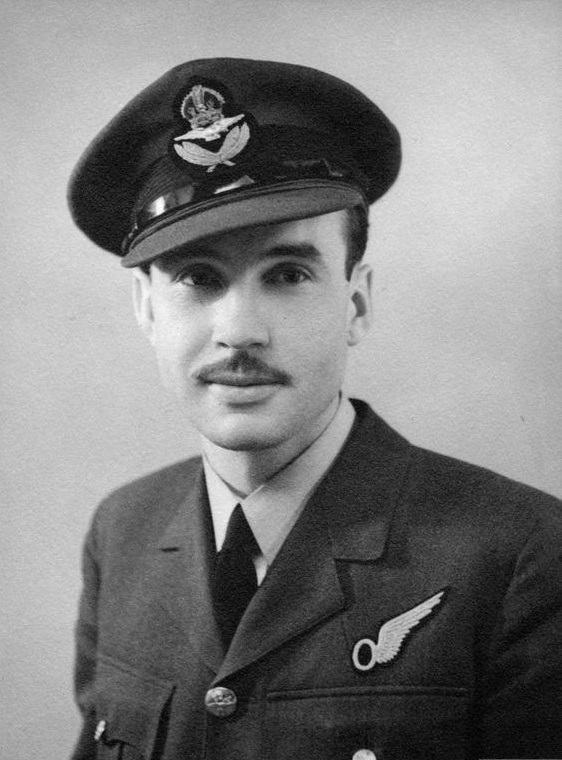
- Born: Gordon Arthur Kidder; 9 December 1914; St. Catharines, Ontario, Canada
- Died: 29 March 1944 (aged 29) near Ostrava
- Burial place: Poznan Old Garrison Cemetery, Poland
- Military career
- Allegiance: Canada
- Branch: Royal Canadian Air Force
- Service years: 1941–1944
- Rank: Flight Lieutenant
- Service number: J/10177
- Unit: No. 156 Squadron RAF
- Conflicts: World War II: Channel Front (POW)
- Awards: Mentioned in Despatches

Gordon Arthur Kidder (9 December 1914 – 29 March 1944), was a Royal Canadian Air Force officer, the navigator of a Vickers Wellington bomber, who was taken prisoner during the Second World War. He took part in the 'Great Escape' from Stalag Luft III in March 1944, but was one of the men recaptured and subsequently shot by the Gestapo.

== Pre-war life ==
Gordon was born in St. Catharines, Ontario, the son of Ethel May and Arthur Kidder, a cannery manager, and educated in the local high school and then at the University of Toronto after winning the James Harris Scholarship for modern languages where he studied both French and German languages earning a Bachelor of Arts degree. While at university he was a member of Phi Kappa Sigma fraternity, Italo-Spanish Club, the German Club, the French Club, the Players Guild and on the Varsity staff. In 1937 he was accepted by Johns Hopkins University at Baltimore to do a Master of Arts degree in German. He changed his mind and decided to work for the Ontario Department of Education and later as a translator with an insurance company in Toronto.

== War service ==
On 8 January 1941 in Toronto Kidder enlisted in the Royal Canadian Air Force, to train for aircrew and completed basic training and then during initial aircrew training in Canada he was selected to train as a navigator. After completing his training Kidder was a part of a draft which sailed for England where he joined No. 23 Operational Training Unit at Pershore, Worcestershire, where he flew on his first two missions before joining No. 149 Squadron RAF which was flying Short Stirling heavy bombers. His crew arrived at the squadron to find that there was a shortage of aircraft, they volunteered to join the Pathfinder Force and on 8 September 1942 transferred to No. 156 Squadron RAF at RAF Warboys to fly Vickers Wellingtons. The crew completed eight operations bombing German targets primarily in the industrial Ruhr valley before being assigned to attack the naval town of Kiel which was a u-boat and warship construction dockyards and naval base.

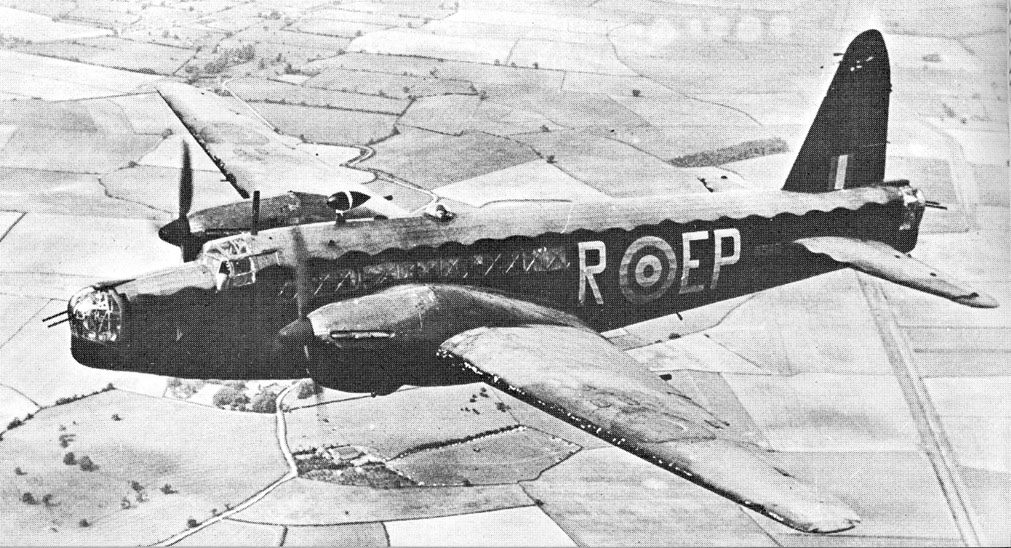
The Merlin-engined Wellington Mark II. This aircraft belongs to No. 104 Sqn.

== Prisoner of war ==
On the evening of 13–14 October 1942, Kidder took off in a Wellington Mark III bomber (serial number BJ775) from RAF Warboys to bomb targets in the German port town of Kiel. Over the target area their aircraft was spotted by German searchlights and hit by anti-aircraft fire. An engine cut out and the crew tried to get back to Britain, but the remaining engine cut out and the Wellington crashed into the North Sea. Three members of the crew were killed. Sergeant Kidder, the navigator, and an air gunner Sergeant Earl E. MacDonald RCAF survived, with Kidder suffering a broken ankle. The two airmen were rescued from a rubber dinghy some hours later and taken prisoner of war. Kidder was hospitalized by the Germans for treatment before being sent to Stalag Luft III in the province of Lower Silesia near the town of Sagan (now Żagań in Poland) just before Christmas of 1942 as prisoner of war No. 42822, he was commissioned and also promoted while in captivity.

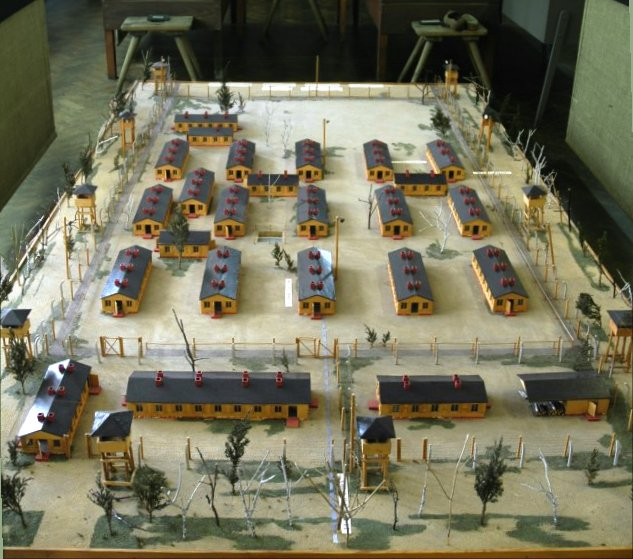
Model of Stalag Luft III prison camp

== 'Great Escape' ==
The original escape plan teamed Kidder up with Dick Churchill to travel posing as Rumanian woodcutters but the final plan had him with deeply sun tanned "Tom" Thomas Kirby-Green, who had been in charge of security for organizer Roger Bushell's "escape committee", they would be posing as Spanish labourers. He was among the first 30 of the 76 men who escaped the prison camp on the night of 24–25 March 1944 in the escape now famous as "the Great Escape". The pair cleared the tunnel exit before the alarm was sounded and made it to the local railway station where they were almost exposed when questioned by a female member of the prison camp censor staff who involved a policeman who was convinced by their poor Spanish and broken German and let them go. They boarded the train for Breslau From Breslau station they changed trains for Czechoslovakia hoping for a further connection to Yugoslavia or Hungary where Thomas Kirby-Green had friends, but after crossing the border were recaptured at Hodonín in southern Moravia close to the Austrian frontier on 28 March 1944. Held at Zlín prison they were the only prisoners interrogated physically and violently The two escapers were taken away by the Zlín Gestapo in two cars which headed out onto the Breslau road and shot near Moravská Ostrava (today part of Ostrava), their bodies being cremated in the local crematorium there. Their urns were returned to Stalag Luft III, marked with the date 29 March 1944 and the name of the town Mahrisch.

Kidder was one of the 50 escapers executed and murdered by the Gestapo. Originally his remains were buried at Sagan, he is now buried in part of the Poznan Old Garrison Cemetery. he is also commemorated by the Royal Canadian Air Force.

Memorial to "The Fifty" down the road toward Żagań (Kidder is on the right)

Kidder's name was amongst those in the list of the murdered prisoners which was published when news broke on or about 19–20 May 1944. The Glasgow Herald of 19 May 1944 published an early list naming several officers including Kidder and in the "Ottawa Citizen" on 27 February 1946.

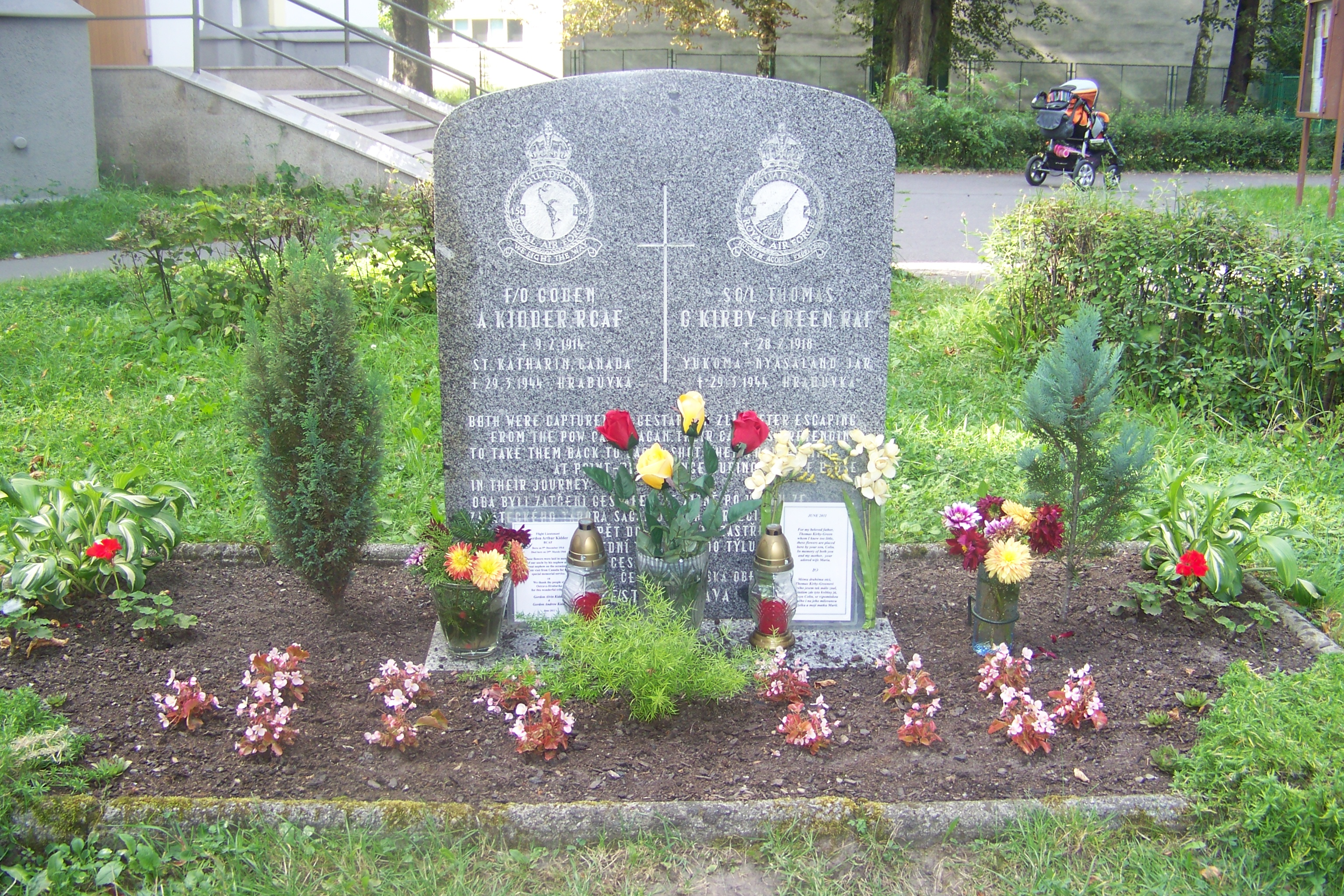
RAF memorial in Hrabůvka

Post-war Czech investigators identified the participants in the murders of Kirby-Green and Gordon Kidder at Hrabuvka, part of Ostrava, and notified their British opposite numbers on 2 December 1945.

== Awards ==
Mentioned in Despatches for conspicuous gallantry as a prisoner of war (none of the other relevant decorations then available could be awarded posthumously). It was published in a supplement to the London Gazette on 8 June 1944.

== Other victims ==
See Stalag Luft III murders

The Gestapo executed a group of 50 of the recaptured prisoners representing almost all of the nationalities involved in the escape. Post-war investigations saw a number of those guilty of the murders tracked down, arrested and tried for their crimes.

Nationalities of the 50 executed
(United Kingdom) 21 British
(Canada) 6 Canadian
(Poland) 6 Polish
(Australia) 5 Australian
(South Africa) 3 South African
(New Zealand) 2 New Zealanders
(Norway) 2 Norwegian
(Belgium) 1 Belgian
(Czechoslovakia) 1 Czechoslovak
(France) 1 Frenchman
(Greece) 1 Greek
(Lithuania) 1 Lithuanian
