= Clement Harris =

English pianist and composer (1871–1897)

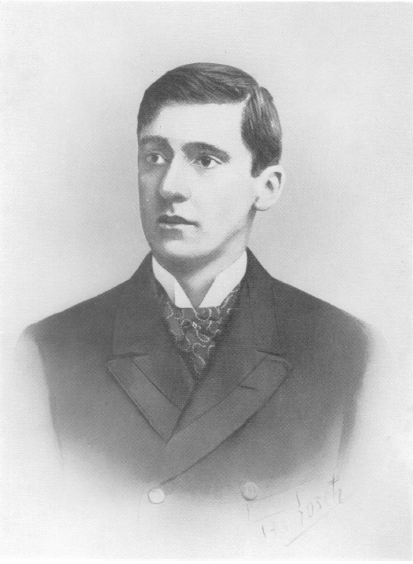
- Born: Clement Hugh Gilbert Harris; 8 July 1871; Wimbledon, London, UK
- Died: 23 April 1897 (aged 25); Briga, Ioannina Vilayet, Ottoman Empire (now Pente Pigadia, Greece)
- Cause of death: Killed in action
- Education: Harrow School
- Occupations: Pianist; Composer; Soldier
- Military career
- Allegiance: Kingdom of Greece
- Branch: Hellenic Army
- Service years: 1897
- Conflicts: Greco-Turkish War (1897); Battle of Pente Pigadia †

Clement Hugh Gilbert Harris (8 July 1871 – 23 April 1897) was an English pianist and composer who studied in Germany and died fighting in the Greco-Turkish War of 1897.

== Biography ==
Clement Harris was born on 8 July 1871 in Wimbledon, London, into a family of ship-owners. His siblings included Sir Austin Edward Harris, who became a noted banker, Frederick Leverton Harris, a British Member of Parliament, and Walter Burton Harris, a journalist, writer, traveller and socialite who achieved fame for his writings on Morocco. He was educated at Harrow School, and subsequently studied music in Frankfurt, where he was a piano pupil of Clara Schumann.

=== Friendship with Siegfried Wagner ===
Harris became intimate friends with Siegfried Wagner after meeting him in 1889 at a soirée at the house of Edward Speyer. Becoming restless after spending the summer of 1891 in Bayreuth with Siegfried, Harris proposed taking a free trip to the far East on one of his father's ships. In 1892, Siegfried travelled to London where Harris introduced him to Oscar Wilde. Harris is described as a protegé of Wilde's for whom Harris would perform [Richard] Wagner transcriptions. Wilde liked to talk with Harris about "the most marvellous of all things; painting, music, love". Siegfried and Harris embarked on the merchant ship Wakefield for a trip that would last almost six months. It transpired that they were the only two passengers on the ship. When Siegfried later wrote his memoirs he devoted over half the book to his recollections of this trip.

During the voyage both men spent much of the time working on their respective musical compositions: Siegfried planned the structure of his symphonic poem Sehnsucht ("Yearning"), while Harris sketched themes for his orchestral work Paradise Lost after Milton. Both pieces were premiered in 1895. Siegfried's memoirs recall how the pair ate cat and dog meat in Canton, bathed nude on a Malaysian beach, and were serenaded by a harpist in the Philippines. In Hong Kong, Harris helped Siegfried make the momentous decision to abandon his goal of becoming an architect and instead choose a composing and conducting career. When the Wakefield docked at Port Said, Siegfried decided to quickly return to Bayreuth in time for the festival's rehearsals. In his 1892 Reisetagebuch ("travel journal"), but not in his memoir, Siegfried recalled their parting.

My dear Clement accompanied me on board where we said goodbye, superficially in as English a way as possible because lots of people were milling around us, but in our hearts with that affection and intimacy with which we had learned to love one another.

When, in 1922–23, Siegfried Wagner composed the symphonic poem Glück ("Happiness"), Jonathan Carr considers that "he evidently dedicated it in private to the dead friend whose picture never left his desk". Carr concludes that for all Siegfried's other emotional entanglements, male and female, "much suggests that in Clement Harris Siegfried found and lost the love of his life".

== Career ==
Clement Harris's works included pieces for piano, including Il pensieroso and L'Allegro after Milton, romances for violin and piano and clarinet, cello and piano, and songs. His diaries were published in German by the Stefan George scholar Claus Bock.

== Death ==
An enthusiastic admirer of Greek culture, he was travelling in Greece at the outbreak of the Greco-Turkish War of 1897, and organised his own battalion of mercenaries to fight on the Greek side. He was killed at Pente Pigadia on 23 April 1897 at the age of 25.

Harris's death was commemorated by the poet Stefan George in the poem "Pente Pigadia" in his collection Der siebente Ring.

== Discography ==
- Paradise Lost, and Festival March in "Siegfried Wagner, Max von Schillings & Clement Harris: Orchestral Works", performed by Thüringen Symphony Orchestra, conducted by Konrad Bach, (27 June 2004), Marco Polo
- The Complete Piano & Chamber Music, performed by various artists, (2004-04-01), VMS /Zappel Music VMS124
