= Jules Jacques Veyrassat =

French painter and engraver (1828–1893)

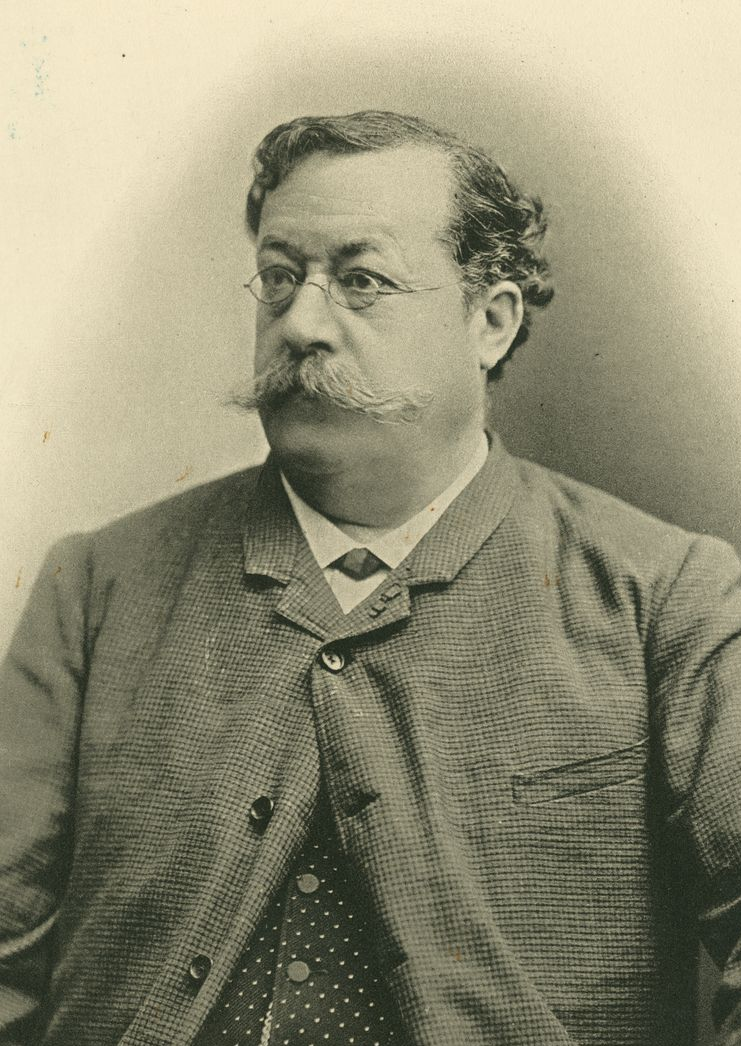
Portrait of Veyrassat by Joseph Lemercier

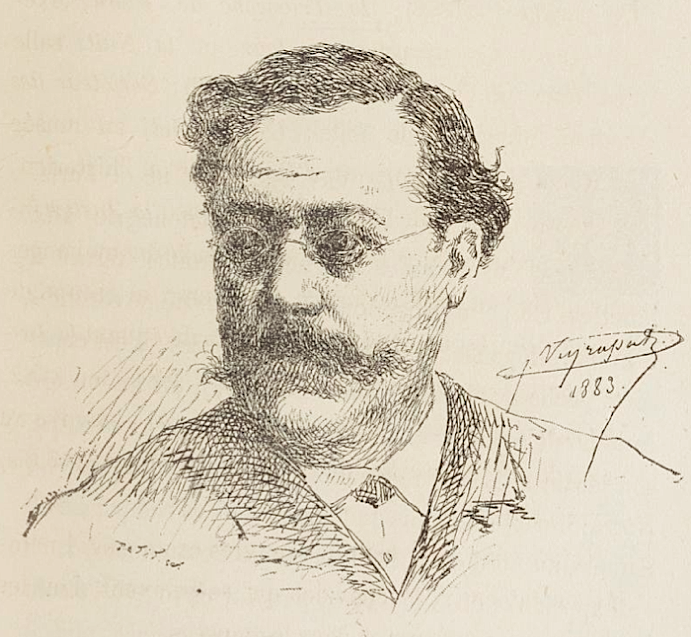
Self-portrait (1883)

Jules Jacques Veyrassat (12 April 1828, Paris – 2 July 1893, Paris) was a French painter and etcher; associated with the Barbizon school. Most of his works feature animals.

== Biography ==
He studied in Paris with Henri Lehmann and exhibited his first works at the Salon of 1848. He began to work as an engraver in the 1860s, after becoming associated with the École d'Écouen and studying with Pierre Édouard Frère. It was, in fact, Frère and Charles-François Daubigny who encouraged him to take up that art.

Between 1866 and 1869, he was presented with several awards for his engravings. Later, he collaborated with the British art critic, Philip Gilbert Hamerton, on two of his books devoted to the topic: Chapters on Animals (1874), with Karl Bodmer, and the third edition of Etching and Etchers (1880), which featured the works of many notable artists, such as James Abbott McNeill Whistler, Jozef Israëls and Alphonse Legros. He also produced engravings for a series of albums published by Alfred Cadart. He was named a Knight in the Legion of Honor in 1878.

He was also associated with the Barbizon school, two of whose members, Charles Jacque and Jean-François Millet, had an influence on his style. As a result, his landscapes all depict some aspect of life in rural France. It would appear that he never travelled to any other countries.

He died in Paris and was interred at the Cimetière du Père-Lachaise.

His works are in the collections of museums throughout France, as well as at the Manchester Art Gallery, the Legion of Honor in San Francisco, the Clark Art Institute in Williamstown, Massachusetts and the Walters Art Museum in Baltimore.

== Selected paintings ==
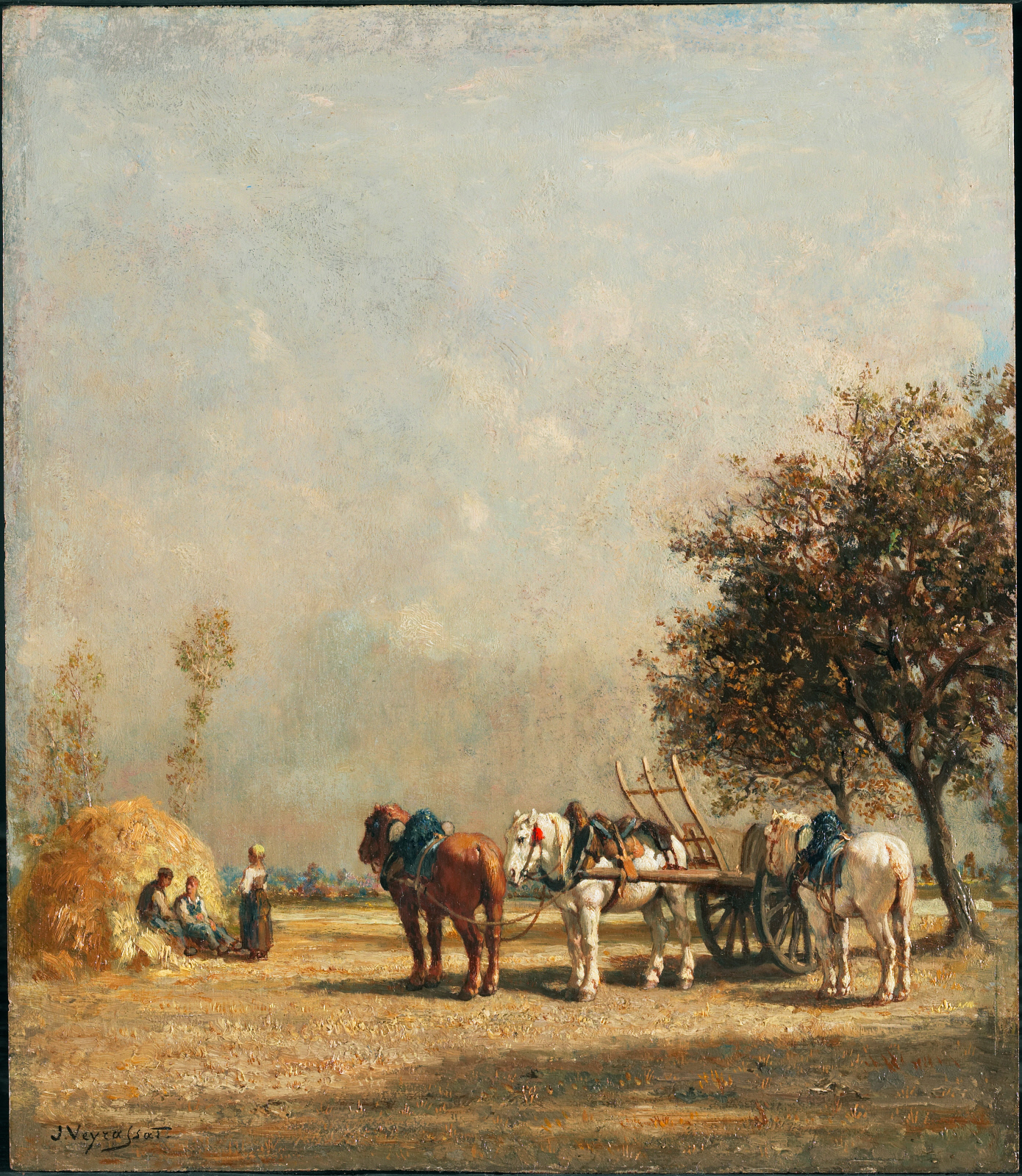
Hay Wain

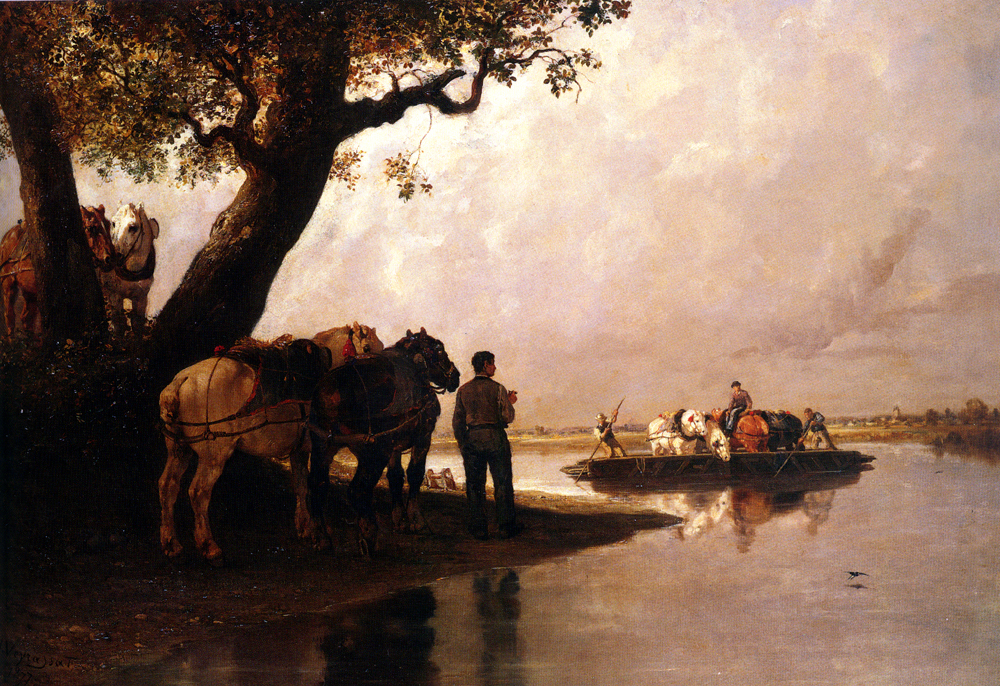
The Horse Ferry

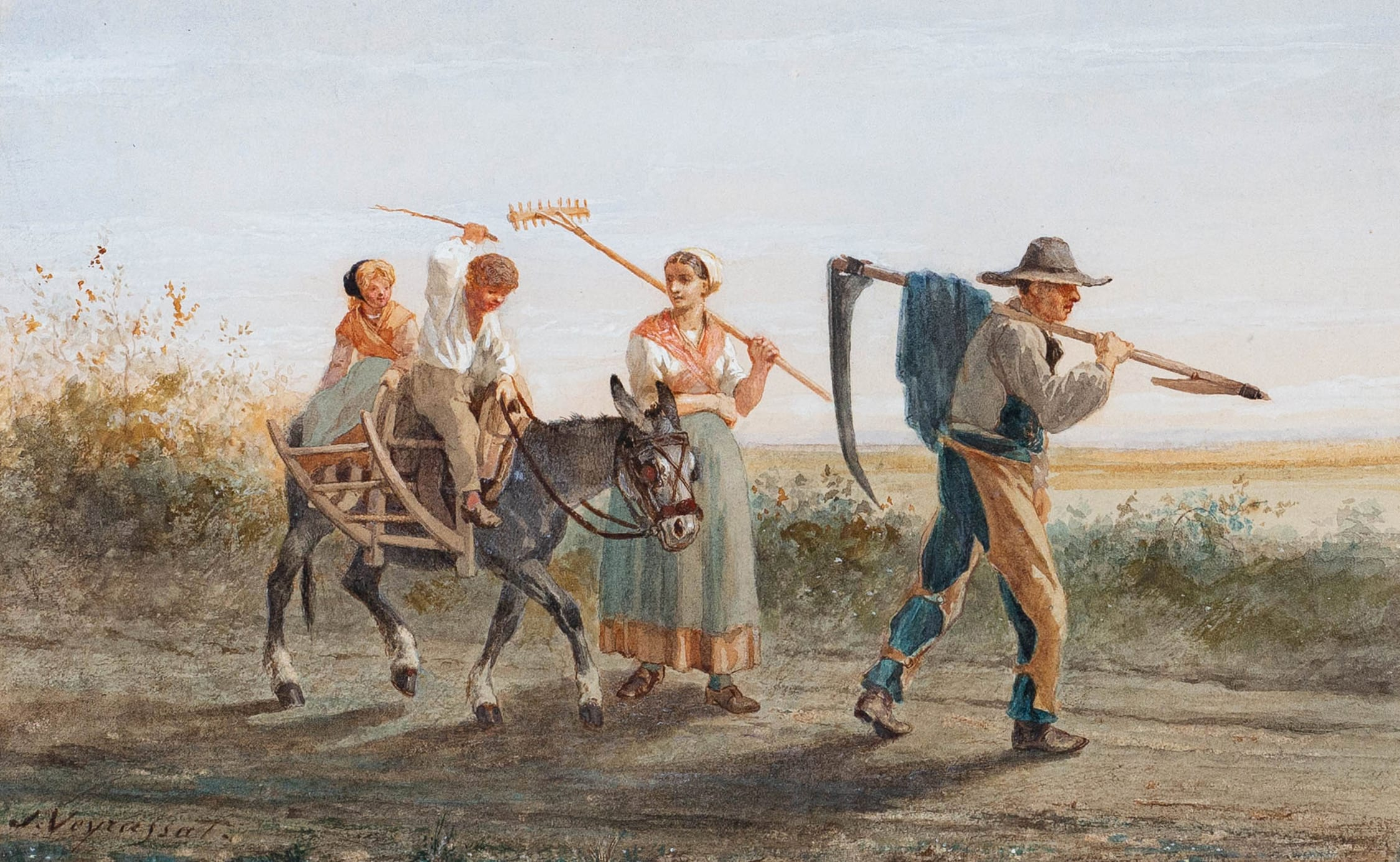
Return from the Fields

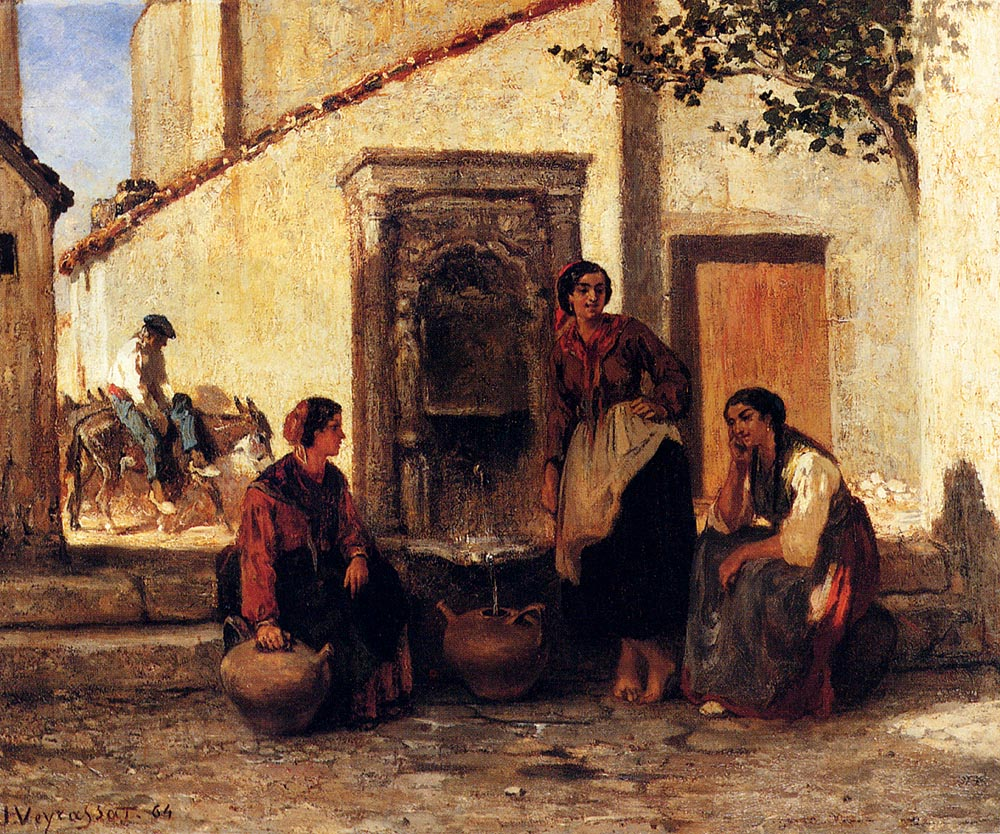
At the Fountain

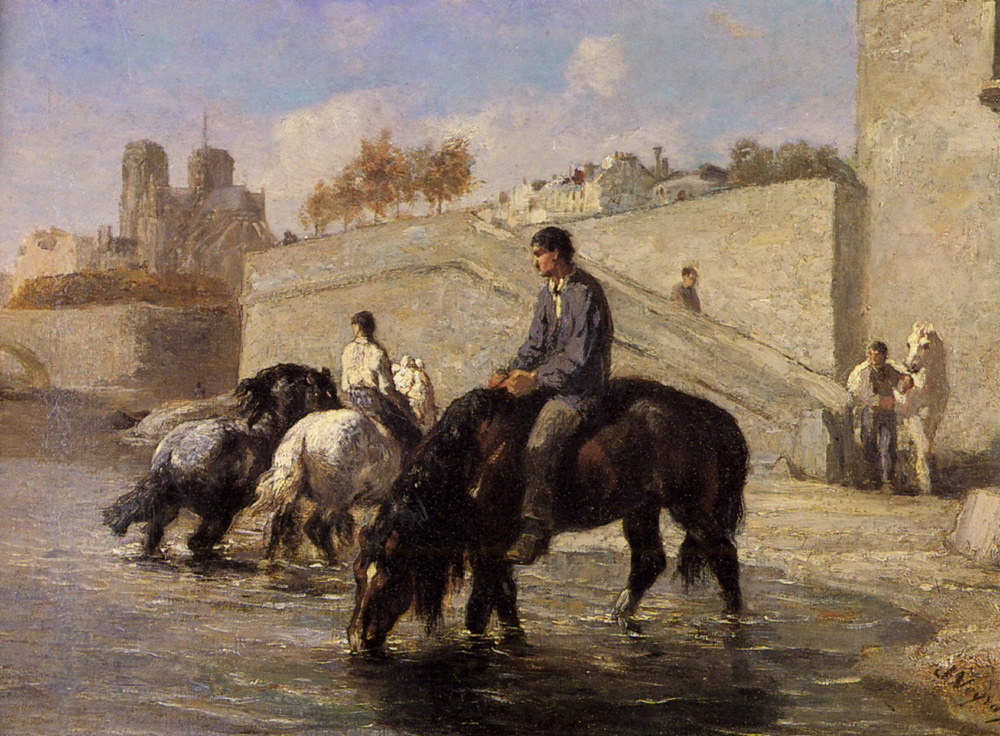
Horses Being Watered in the Seine
