= W. C. Steadman =

British trade unionist and Liberal-Labour politician

- William Steadman

Member of Parliament for Finsbury Central
- In office 1906-January 1910

President of the Trades Union Congress
- In office 1902

Member of Parliament for Stepney
- In office 1898–1900

Personal details
- Born: 12 July 1851; Poplar, London, England
- Died: 20 July 1911 (aged 60)
- Political party: Lib-Lab/Liberal; Progressive

William Charles Steadman (12 July 1851 – 20 July 1911) was a prominent trade unionist and Liberal or Lib-Lab politician.

== Life ==
Born in Poplar, London, Steadman began work at the age of eight, and in 1866 became a barge builder. In 1873, he joined the River Thames Barge Builders Trades Union, becoming its general secretary in 1879 and holding the post until 1908. In 1890, he led a successful eighteen-week strike, raising his profile. In 1892, Steadman was elected as a Progressive Party member of London County Council (LCC), representing Stepney. In the 1892 general election he unsuccessfully stood as the Liberal Party candidate for the Mid (or Medway) division of Kent; he lost again in the 1895 election in Hammersmith.

He joined the Fabian Society. Steadman was finally elected as a Lib–Lab Member of Parliament (MP) for Stepney at the March by-election in 1898 which took place because of the death of F. W. Isaacson in February, who had held the seat since 1896.

This meant that he now represented Stepney both in Parliament and on the London County Council, having been re-elected there in elections in 1895 and 1898. In 1899, he was elected to the Parliamentary Committee (later the General Council) of the Trades Union Congress (TUC), and in 1902 he was its President. Steadman lost his seat in Parliament at the 1900 general election to Major William Evans-Gordon.

He continued to represent Stepney on the LCC, being re-elected there in 1901 and 1904. He went on to chair the first conference of the Labour Representation Committee, but left the organisation when asked to leave the Liberal Party. In 1904, he was elected as the Parliamentary Secretary of the TUC, the post which later became the General Secretary.

In 1906, Steadman again stood for the Liberal Party, and won Finsbury Central. He lost the seat in the January 1910 general election. In 1911, he announced his intention to stand down from his TUC post, but died, aged 60, before this could take effect.

=== Election results ===
Steadman

1895 General Election: Hammersmith
Party	Candidate	Votes	%	±%
Conservative	Walter Tuckfield Goldsworthy	5,017	60.8	6.7
Lib-Lab	William Charles Steadman	3,238	39.2	−6.7
Majority		1,779		
Turnout		12,378	66.7	
Conservative hold		Swing		

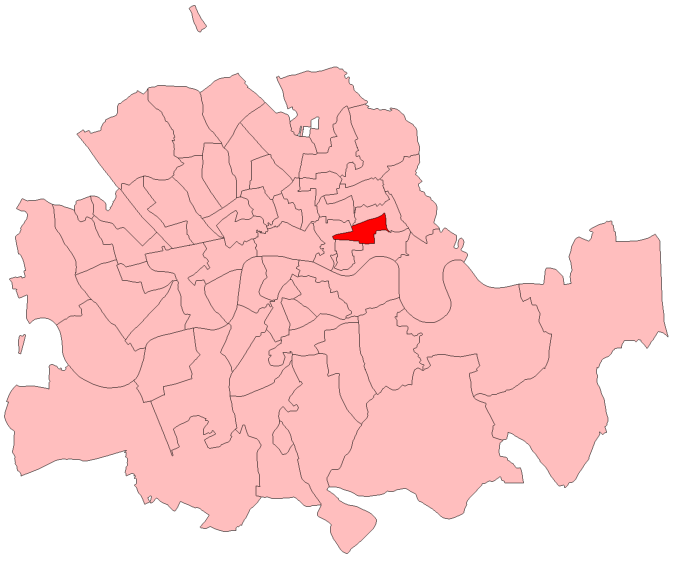
Stepney in London.

1898 Stepney by-election
Party	Candidate	Votes	%	±%
Lib-Lab	William Charles Steadman	2,492	50.2	
Conservative	William Eden Evans-Gordon	2,472	49.8	
Majority		20	0.4	
Turnout		6,387	77.7	
Lib-Lab gain from Conservative		Swing	+5.8	

General election 1900: Tower Hamlets, Stepney
Party	Candidate	Votes	%	±%
Conservative	William Eden Evans-Gordon	2,783	61.8	
Lib-Lab	William Charles Steadman	1,718	38.2	
Majority		1,065	23.6	
Turnout		5,878	76.6	
Conservative gain from Lib-Lab		Swing	+12.0	

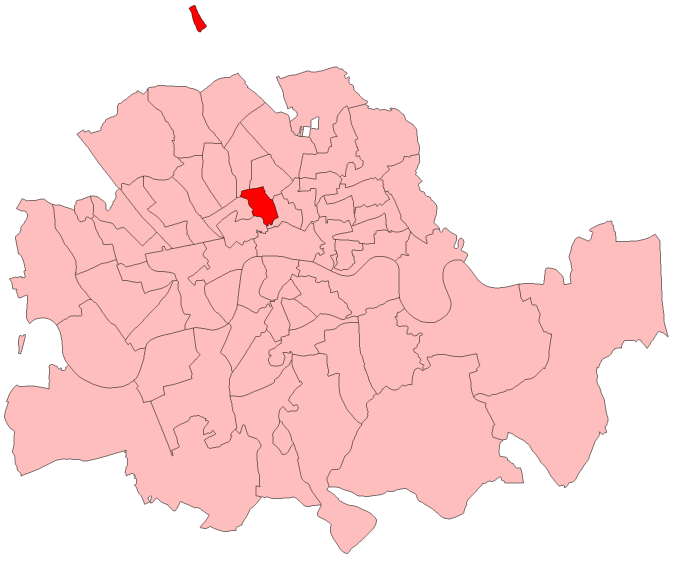
Finsbury Central in London

General election 1906: Finsbury, Central
Party	Candidate	Votes	%	±%
Lib-Lab	William Charles Steadman	3,493	55.5	
Conservative	Edward Alfred Goulding	2,799	44.5	
Majority		694	11.0	
Turnout		8,279	76.0	
Lib-Lab gain from Conservative		Swing	+8.7	

General election January 1910: Finsbury, Central
Party	Candidate	Votes	%	±%
Conservative	Martin Archer-Shee	3,559	52.8	
Lib-Lab	William Charles Steadman	3,187	47.2	
Majority		372	5.6	
Turnout				
Conservative gain from Lib-Lab		Swing	+8.3	

Parliament of the United Kingdom
Preceded by Frederick Wootton Isaacson	Member of Parliament for Stepney; 1898–1900	Succeeded by William Evans-Gordon
Preceded by William Frederick Barton Massey-Mainwaring	Member of Parliament for Finsbury Central; 1906–January 1910	Succeeded by Martin Archer-Shee
Party political offices
Preceded by New position	Chairman of the Annual Conference of the Labour Representation Committee; 1900	Succeeded by John Hodge
Trade union offices
Preceded by Thomas Ashton and Robert Johnstone	Auditor of the Trades Union Congress; 1893; With: Thomas Ashton	Succeeded by Thomas Ashton and Fred Hammill
Preceded by C. W. Bowerman	Treasurer of the Trades Union Congress; 1901–1902	Succeeded by William John Davis
Preceded by C. W. Bowerman	President of the Trades Union Congress; 1902	Succeeded by W. Boyd Hornidge
Preceded by Sam Woods	Secretary of the Parliamentary Committee of the TUC; 1905–1911	Succeeded by C. W. Bowerman
