= 1864 in literature =

This article contains information about the literary events and publications of 1864.

In these times of ours, though concerning the exact year there is no need to be precise...

—Opening of Our Mutual Friend

== Events ==
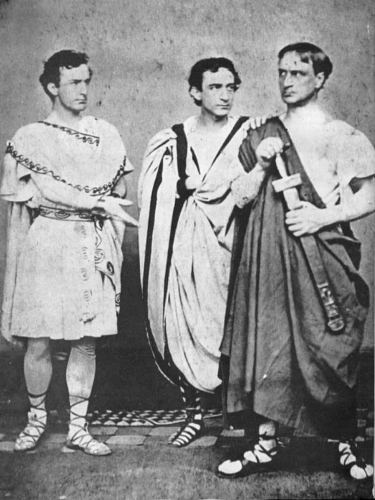
John Wilkes, Edwin and Junius Booth Jr. in Shakespeare's Julius Caesar in 1864 (l to r)

- January – Anthony Trollope's Can You Forgive Her?, the first of his Palliser novels, begins to appear in monthly parts in London. Trollope completes it on April 28 and the first volume is published as a book in September by Chapman & Hall. In April, The Small House at Allington concludes publication in the Cornhill Magazine and is published in book form by George Smith.
- January 2–April 16 – James Payn publishes his most popular story, Lost Sir Massingberd, in Chambers's Journal. He follows it in the magazine (August 6 – December 24) by Married Beneath Him.
- February 20 – Painter George Frederic Watts marries his 16-year-old model, the actress Ellen Terry, 30 years his junior, in London. She elopes less than a year later.
- March (dated January–February) – The first issue of the Russian literary magazine Epoch («Эпо́ха»), edited by Fyodor Dostoyevsky and his brother Mikhail (died July 22), is published in Saint Petersburg. This and the March and April issues contain the first publication of Fyodor's existential novella Notes from Underground («Записки из подполья», Zapiski iz podpol'ya).
- April 10 – Publisher William Ticknor dies of pneumonia in Philadelphia while on a trip with Nathaniel Hawthorne for the sake of the latter's health.
- April 23 – The Deutsche Shakespeare-Gesellschaft (German Shakespeare Society) is founded as the first scientific and cultural association of its type in Weimar, and one of the world's oldest continuing literary societies.
- April – Charles Baudelaire leaves Paris for Belgium in the hope of resolving his financial difficulties.
- May 26 – Alexandre Dumas, fils marries Nadejda Naryschkine. His father, Alexandre Dumas, père, returns to Paris from Italy.
- May – The first Lithuanian press ban is imposed in the Russian Empire.
- June 19 – Henrik Ibsen arrives in Rome in a self-imposed exile from Norway that will last for 27 years.
- June 27 – Ambrose Bierce is wounded at the Battle of Kennesaw Mountain.
- July 2 – The Female Detective is published under the pseudonym "Andrew Forrester, Junior" in London, presenting the first female professional detective in fiction. Around December, she is followed by Mrs Paschal in Revelations of a Lady Detective, published anonymously by William Stephens Hayward. R. D. Blackmore's first published work of fiction, the sensation novel Clara Vaughan, also issued anonymously this year in England, has a heroine solving a mystery.
- September – A debate at the Royal Geographical Society between Richard Francis Burton and John Hanning Speke is prevented by Speke's suicide (or accidental shooting).
- November 10 – The poet and critic John Addington Symonds the younger marries Janet Catherine North.
- November 25 – The brothers Edwin Booth (playing Brutus), John Wilkes Booth (who carries out the assassination of Abraham Lincoln the following year, playing Mark Antony) and Junius Brutus Booth Jr. (playing Cassius) make their only appearance onstage together, in a performance of Shakespeare's Julius Caesar (in the year of the playwright's birth tricentennial) at the Winter Garden Theater in New York City, staged to raise funds for a memorial to William Shakespeare in the city's Central Park.
- December – Sheridan Le Fanu's Gothic locked room mystery-thriller Uncle Silas completes its serialisation in his Dublin University Magazine as "Maud Ruthyn and Uncle Silas" and is published as a three-volume novel by Richard Bentley in London.
- unknown date – The English former chess master Howard Staunton publishes a facsimile of the 1600 quarto text of Shakespeare's Much Ado About Nothing, the first use of photolithography for such a book.

== New books ==
=== Fiction ===
- William Harrison Ainsworth – John Law
- Louisa May Alcott – Moods
- José de Alencar – Diva
- Jules Amédée Barbey d'Aurevilly – Chevalier Destouches
- R. D. Blackmore – Clara Vaughan
- Mary Elizabeth Braddon – Henry Dunbar: the Story of an Outcast
- Anne Moncure Crane – Emily Chester
- Charles Dickens – Our Mutual Friend (serialization commences)
- Fyodor Dostoevsky – Notes from Underground
- Alexandre Dumas – La Sanfelice
- Georg Ebers – Eine ägyptische Königstochter (An Egyptian Princess)
- Amelia Edwards – Barbara's History
- George Eliot – "Brother Jacob"
- Elizabeth Gaskell – Wives and Daughters (serialization begins)
- The Goncourt brothers (Edmond and Jules de Goncourt) – Renée Mauperin
- Sheridan Le Fanu
  - Uncle Silas
  - Wylder's Hand
- Nikolai Leskov (as M. Stebnitsky) – No Way Out («Не′куда», Nekuda)
- George MacDonald – The Light Princess
- John Neal — The Moose-Hunter, or Life in the Maine Woods
- Charlotte Riddell (as F. G. Trafford) – George Geith of Fen Court
- G. O. Trevelyan – The Competition Wallah (book publication)
- Anthony Trollope
  - The Small House at Allington (serial publication ends and book publication)
  - Can You Forgive Her? (serial publication begins)
- Jules Verne – The Adventures of Captain Hatteras (Voyages et Aventures du capitaine Hatteras) (French serialization)

=== Children and young people ===
- Rebecca Sophia Clarke (Sophie May) – Little Prudy (first in an eponymous series)
- Jules Verne – A Journey to the Center of the Earth (Voyage au centre de la Terre)
- Charlotte Mary Yonge – A Book of Golden Deeds of All Times and All Lands

=== Drama ===
- Matthías Jochumsson – Útilegumennirnir (The Outlaws)
- Aleksis Kivi
  - Kullervo (published in a revised version)
  - Heath Cobblers (Nummisuutarit)
- Thomas William Robertson – David Garrick

=== Poetry ===
- Robert Browning – Dramatis Personae
- Alfred Tennyson – Enoch Arden
- Alfred de Vigny (died 1863) – Les Destinées

=== Non-fiction ===
- Augusta Theodosia Drane – History of England for Family Use
- Edward Eastwick – The Journal of a Diplomate's Three Years' Residence in Persia
- George Perkins Marsh – Man and Nature
- Roger Gougenot des Mousseaux – Les Hauts Phénomènes de la magie
- John Henry Newman – Apologia Pro Vita Sua
- John Ruskin – Cestus of Aglaia
- Henry David Thoreau (died 1862) – The Maine Woods
- Noah Webster (died 1843), revised by Carl August Friedrich Mahn and edited by Noah Porter – A Dictionary of the English Language, "unabridged" edition

== Births ==
- January 24 – Marguerite Durand, French actress, journalist and feminist leader (died 1936)
- February 14 – Israel Zangwill, English novelist, playwright and Zionist (died 1926)
- February 21 – Leonard Merrick, English novelist (died 1939)
- February 26 – Antonín Sova, Czech poet and librarian (died 1928)
- April 8 – J. Smeaton Chase, English-born American author and photographer (died 1923)
- April 21 – Max Weber, German sociologist (died 1920)
- May 11 – Ethel Lilian Voynich, née Boole, Anglo-Irish novelist and composer (died 1960)
- July 20 – Erik Axel Karlfeldt, Nobel Prize-winning Swedish writer (died 1931)
- September 22 – Lodewijk van Deyssel (Karel Joan Lodewijk Alberdingk Thijm), Dutch novelist (died 1952)
- September 28 – Barry Pain, English poet and fiction writer (died 1928)
- September 29 – Miguel de Unamuno, Basque Spanish writer (died 1936)
- October 1 – Emma Sheridan Fry, American actor, playwright, and drama teacher (died 1936)
- October 14 – Stefan Żeromski, Polish novelist, poet and dramatist (died 1925)
- October 21 – Mary Tracy Earle, American author and essayist (died 1955)
- November 11
  - Alfred Hermann Fried, Austrian Jewish pacifist writer and Nobel Peace Prize winner (died 1921)
  - Maurice Leblanc, French novelist and crime writer (died 1941)
- November 26 – Herman Gorter, Dutch poet and socialist (died 1927)
- November 28 – James Allen, English self-help writer and poet (died 1912)
- December 12 – Paul Elmer More, American critic and essayist (died 1937)

== Deaths ==
- January 16 – Anton Felix Schindler, Austrian biographer of Beethoven (born 1795)
- January 29
  - Lucy Aikin (Mary Godolphin), English historian (born 1781)
  - Julia Maitland, English writer on India and children's writer (born 1808)
- February 2 – Adelaide Anne Procter, English poet (born 1825)
- March 16 – Robert Smith Surtees, English novelist and sporting writer (born 1805)
- May 19 – Nathaniel Hawthorne, American novelist (born 1804)
- May 20 – John Clare, English poet (born 1793)
- May 26 – Charles Sealsfield, Austro-American novelist and journalist (born 1793)
- July 4 – Thomas Colley Grattan, Irish miscellanist and novelist (born 1792)
- August 6 – Catherine Sinclair, Scottish novelist and children's writer (born 1800)
- August 7 – Janez Puhar, Slovene poet (born 1814)
- September 17 – Walter Savage Landor, English writer and poet (born 1775)
- November 3 – Gonçalves Dias, Brazilian poet and playwright (shipwreck, born 1823)
- November 28 – William W. Pratt, American playwright and actor
- December 6 – Simonas Daukantas, Lithuanian ethnographer and historian (born 1793)

== Awards ==
- Newdigate Prize – William John Courthope
