= George Smith (publisher, born 1824) =

British newspaper publisher

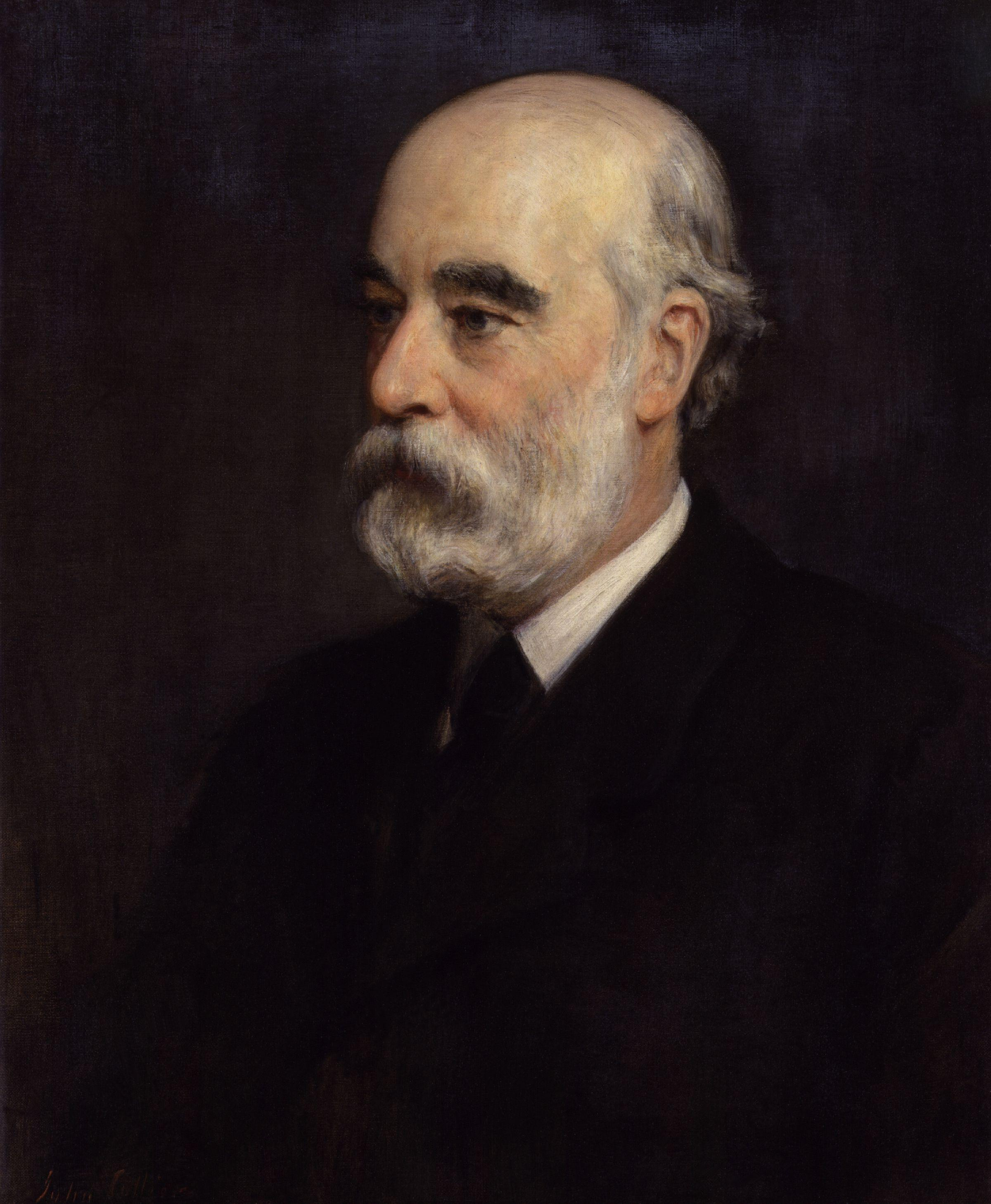
Posthumous portrait of George Smith by John Collier, 1901

George Murray Smith (19 March 1824 – 6 April 1901) was a British publisher. He was the son of George Smith (1789–1846), who, with Alexander Elder (1790–1876), started the Victorian publishing firm of Smith, Elder & Co. in 1816. His brainchild, The Cornhill Magazine, was the premier fiction-carrying magazine of the 19th century.

== Life ==
Smith was born in 1824, the eldest son of George Smith. He adopted the middle name Murray from his mother Elizabeth. His father had started the printing business with Alexander Elder. and in the year of young George's birth established it at Cornhill.

The firm was extremely successful. At the age of fourteen the young George came into the business, and in 1843 he took over the control of the publishing department. Smith succeeded his father on the latter's death and expanded the product and sales areas to cover most Victorian topics and the British Empire. The firm also supplied a catalogue full of other products desirable to British expatriates. A large portion of the business was connected with foreign agencies and banking, especially with India, but this was relinquished in 1868 to his partner Henry Samuel King, who now separated from the firm, retaining the old premises at Cornhill, while Smith removed the publishing business, now under his sole control, to 15 Waterloo Place.

For over thirty years Smith was the friend and publisher of John Ruskin, and it was with him that Jane Eyre found a publisher. In 1855 was started the Overland Mail, a weekly periodical for readers in India, and the Homeward Mail, containing Indian news for English readers. By Smith, Elder & Co. were issued works by Darwin, Ruskin, Thackeray, Robert and Elizabeth Barrett Browning, Wilkie Collins, Matthew Arnold, Harriet Martineau, James Payn and Mrs Humphry Ward. In 1866 was published Trollope's The Last Chronicle of Barset, for which £3,000 was paid. In January 1860 the first of George Smith's three great undertakings was begun, The Cornhill Magazine being issued in that month under the editorship of Thackeray. The second venture was the founding in 1865 of The Pall Mall Gazette.

One of Smith's most ambitious projects was the Dictionary of National Biography, which covered notable British figures up to its day in 63 volumes published from 1885 to 1900.

George Smith is widely acknowledged to have inspired the character of Graham Bretton in Charlotte Brontë's novel Villette (as he himself believed).

Smith was a wealthy man, not only from his publishing business, but on account of his large ownership in the mineral water Apollinaris and other ventures. From 1890 until his death, Smith lived at Somerset House, in Park Lane, having bought the lease from Lady Hermione Graham, a daughter of the twelfth Duke of Somerset. The house became known as 40, Park Lane. He died at St. George's Hill, Byfleet, Surrey on 6 April 1901.

George Murray Smith the Younger was his son.

== Sources ==
- ODNB Bill Bell, 'Smith, George Murray (1824–1901)', Oxford Dictionary of National Biography, Oxford University Press, Sept 2004; online edn, May 2006 which cites as printed book sources:

- L. Huxley The house of Smith Elder (1923)
- J. W. Robertson Scott The story of the Pall Mall Gazette Oxford University Press (1950)
- J. Glynn Prince of publishers: a biography of George Smith, Alison & Busby (1986) ISBN 0-85031-697-9
