= The John Murray Archive =

Archive in Edinburgh, Scotland

Coordinates: 55°56′55″N 3°11′31″W

- Housed at: National Library of Scotland
- Curators: Curator of John Murray Archive
- Size (no. of items): 1 million +
- Website: www.nls.uk/collections/john-murray

The John Murray Archive is a collection of 234 years' worth of manuscripts, private letters, and business papers from various notable, mostly British, authors including correspondence between Mary Shelley and Lord Byron, and letters of Jane Austen and Charles Darwin. The Archive consists of over a million items, valued at more than £100 million, and is kept at the National Library of Scotland (NLS) in Edinburgh, Scotland.

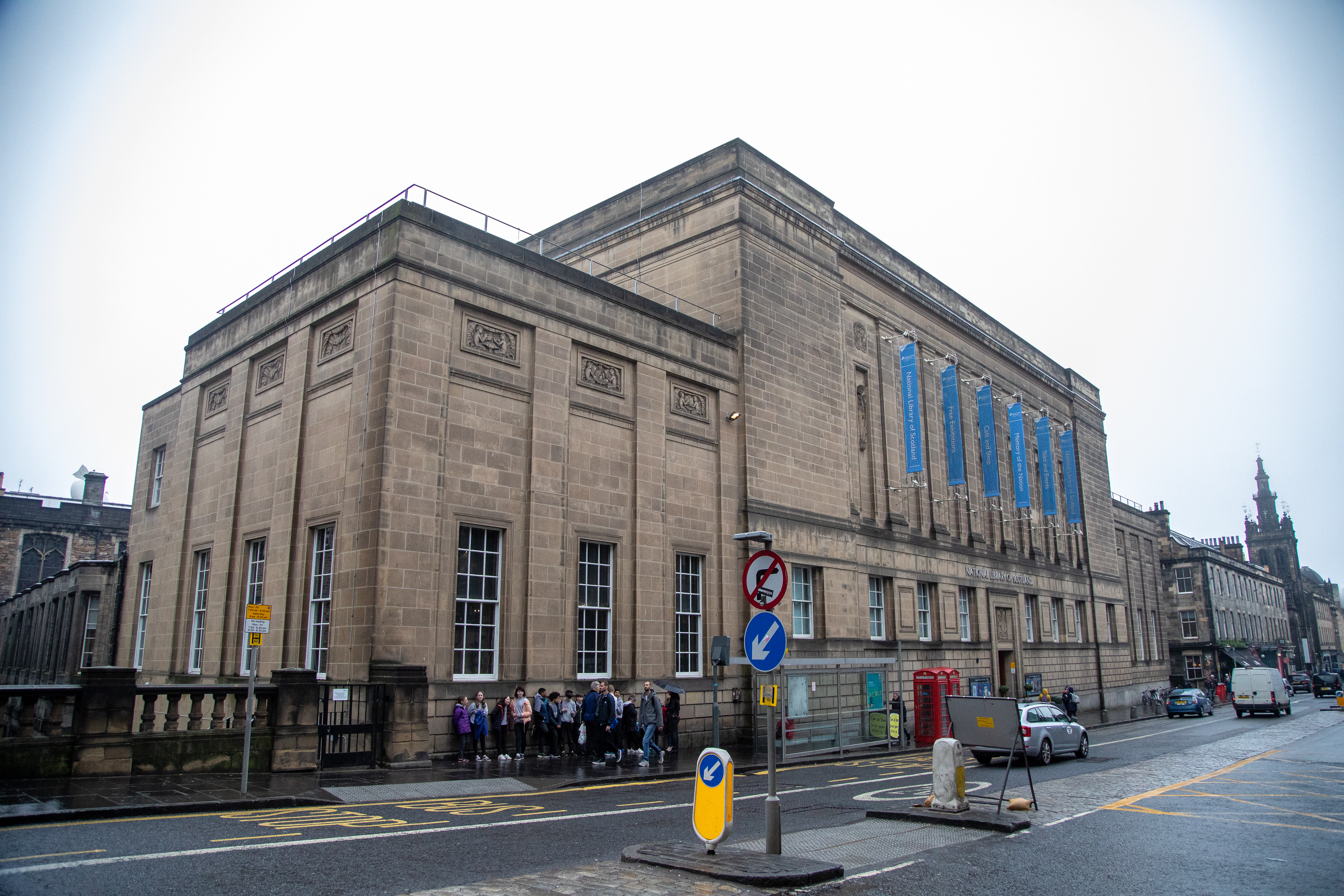
National Library of Scotland, George IV Bridge, Edinburgh, Scotland

== History ==
The father of House of John Murray publishing, John Murray (1737–1793), founded the business in 1768 after moving to London in pursuit of his fortune. Murray, who was born in Scotland as John McMurray, laid the foundations of what would eventually be a much larger and more influential publishing house, though he did help to establish many writers such as Isaac D'Israeli and also launched The English Review in 1783.

Murray was succeeded by his son, John Murray II (1778–1843), who went on to publish notable authors like Jane Austen, Sir Walter Scott, and Lord Byron. The publisher was wildly successful for generations of Murrays to come, with John Murray III (1808–1892) having published Charles Darwin's 'On the Origin of Species' and Herman Melville's first two novels. The third Murray also published Murray's Handbooks for Travellers (1836). In total, the Murray family headed the business from London for seven generations, initially at 32 Fleet Street and then at 50 Albemarle Street in 1812.

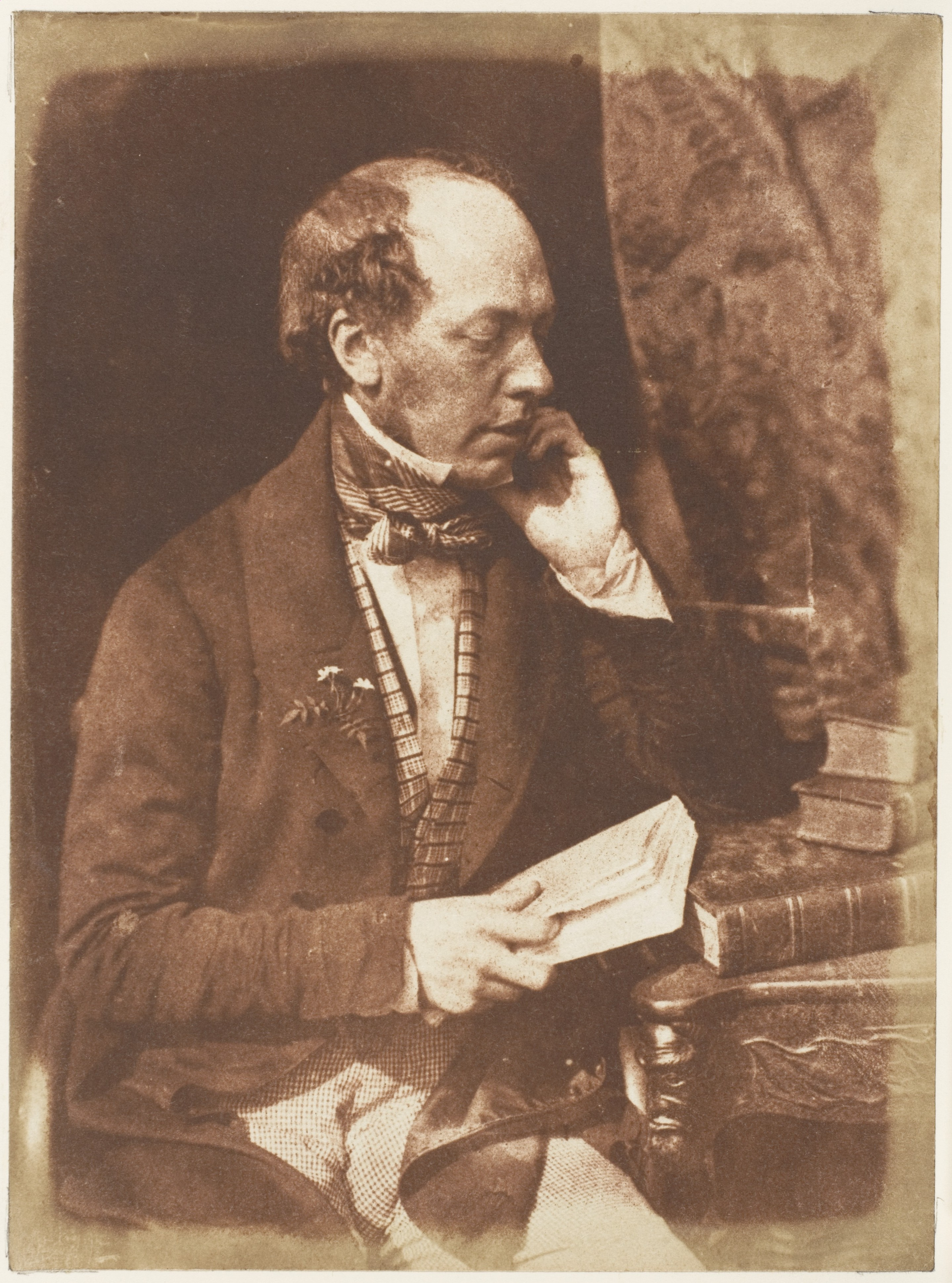
John Murray III, 1843–1847

Over the years the publishing house produced books covering a vast range of genres, from travel to biography. The House of Murray was also involved in other publishing ventures such as John Murray II's periodical, Quarterly Review. The John Murray Archive is a repository for papers and records of the business itself, including information related to the financial and administrative side of the company as well as some literary manuscripts.

Two other publishing archives are contained within the John Murray Archive, the first of these being the papers of Charles Elliot, an Edinburgh-born bookseller and publisher. The Archive has these papers because of John Murray II's marriage to Anne Elliot, Charles Elliot's daughter. Also a part of the John Murray Archive are the papers which relate to Smith, Elder and Company, another publishing house which helped establish the Brontes, Anthony Trollope, and Arthur Conan Doyle.

The National Library of Scotland acquired the John Murray Archive in part in 2006 having bought it from John Murray VII and his wife, Virginia, the most recent owners of House of John Murray publishing, for £31.2 million. This first purchase excluded material relating to John Murray publishing in the 20th century. The NLS has since received further items relating to this period and others, and they continue to do so ad hoc.

== Composition ==
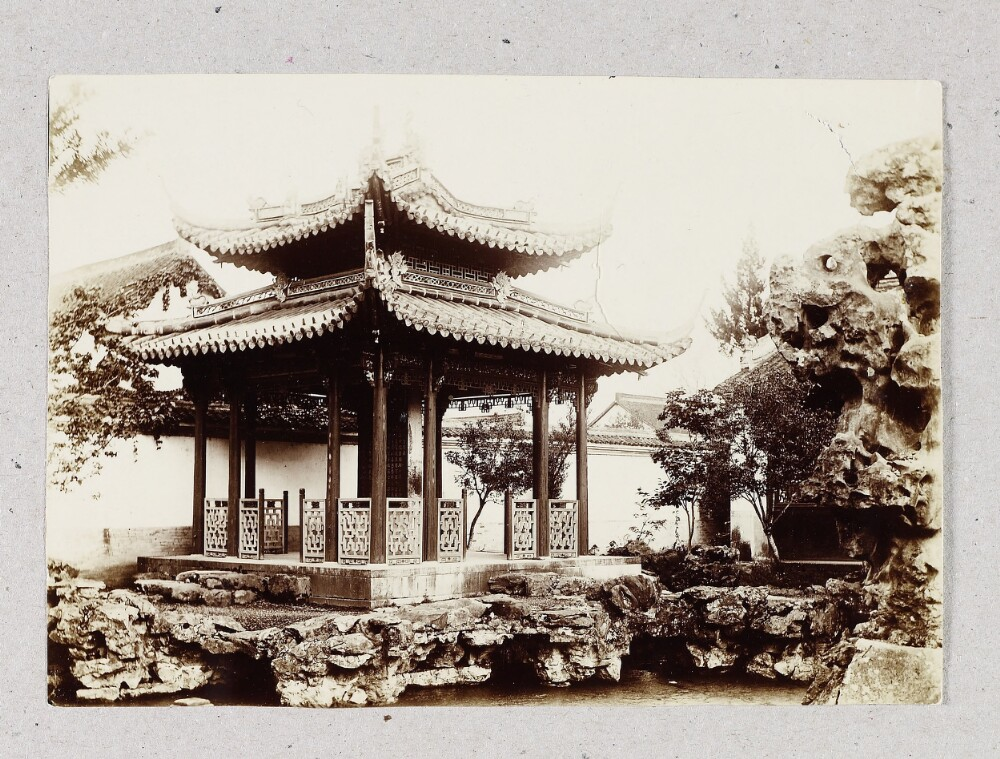
Isabella Lucy Bird's Yangtze Valley and Beyond (1899)

The John Murray Archive is arranged into eight series: the incoming correspondence; outgoing correspondence; author papers, the family papers; business papers; Charles Elliot papers; Smith, Elder and Company Archive; and the papers of Lord Byron. While the collection consists mainly of the works and personal correspondence of significant British writers, there are many items of importance that are products of, or related to, the United States such as the letters of Herman Melville, letters and manuscripts from Washington Irving, and papers and photographs from Isabella Lucy Bird, author of The Englishwoman in America. Over ten thousand articles from the collection are private letters to and from Lord Byron alone and, as such, he is by far the best-represented author in the Archive. The collection, however, is not only made up of the works of poets and writers, but also of archaeologists, politicians, travellers, chefs, and historians.

=== Incoming and outgoing correspondence ===
Both the incoming and outgoing correspondence series consist of letters addressed to and from John Murray publishing from the 18th century up until the 20th. Included in these letters are some of the details of the business, as well as a wealth of personal information.

=== Author papers ===
The author papers section of the archive contains material which relates to some of the most notable authors published by the House of Murray. Made up not only of letters but of photographs, manuscripts, drafts, and hand-written notes by well-known writers such as Charles Darwin, Jane Austen, Sir William Smith, David Livingstone, and Sir Walter Scott. The author papers include items which date back as far as 1743 and as recently as 1930.

=== The family papers ===
The family papers are abundant in letters sent to and from the Murrays' closest family and friends, as well as those to and from more distant relatives.

=== Business papers ===
The business papers in the Archive include all surviving legal and business materials related to the running of John Murray publishing. Included in these are letters which detail information to do with both the financial and administrative portion of the company. The material in this series is dated from 1763-1993.

=== Charles Elliot papers ===
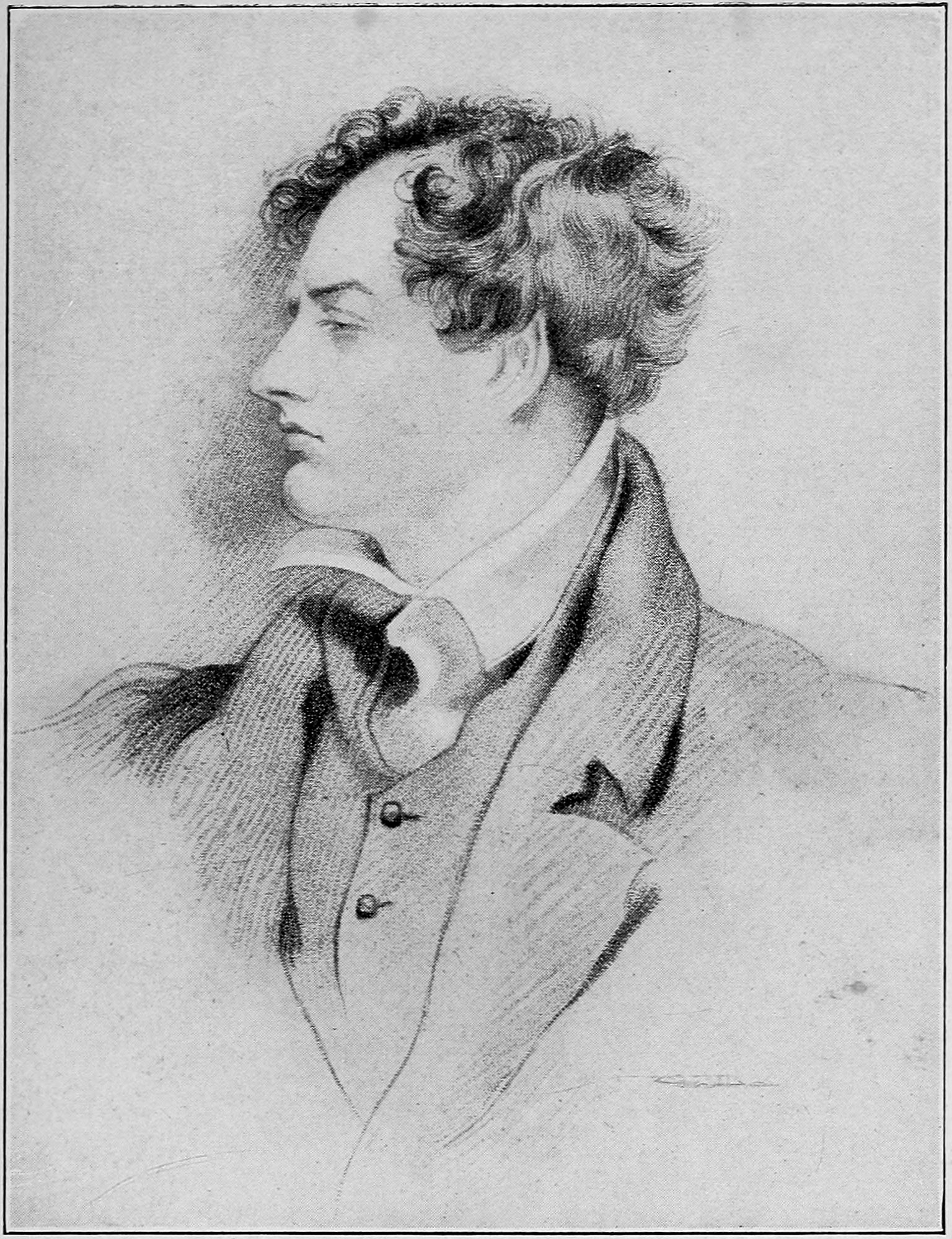
Lord Byron

The papers of Charles Elliot are technically an archive all of their own and are split into three sections: the letter books of Elliot; his ledgers; and the 'Sederunt book of the Trustees approved by Charles Elliot Bookseller in Edinburgh', which have then been sorted into smaller series of their own. The first section, Elliot's letter books, are organised into eight series by date in chronological order. They contain copies of all lasting correspondence between Elliot and various authors, publishers, booksellers, and editors, covering most of the years Elliot was in business with the exception of his first three years. These papers provide a wide-ranging insight into Elliot's personal life and business. Elliot's ledgers make up the second section of the Charles Elliot series, consisting mainly of payment records and other financial materials related to sales and costs of production. Names of purchasers can also be found in Elliot's business ledgers, one being Scottish poet Robert Burns. Elliot's book of the Trustees is a compilation of the minutes from his meetings with Trustees during 1790–1805.

=== Smith, Elder and Company archive ===
This collection makes up a substantial part of the John Murray Archive and contains material from 1848-2004. Smith, Elder and Company had been an important and influential publishing house in the 19th century and so these papers are significant in that they show the inner workings of a successful publishing business as well as in part detail the personal and work lives of Alexander Elder and George Smith, the founders of the company. Included in this Archive are private letters between the company and famous authors like Charlotte Bronte and Elizabeth Gaskell, as well as other materials such as copyright agreements, receipt books, information related to the publishing of the Cornhill Magazine, and papers concerning the sale of the business when it was bought by John Murray in the early 1900s.

=== Lord Byron papers ===
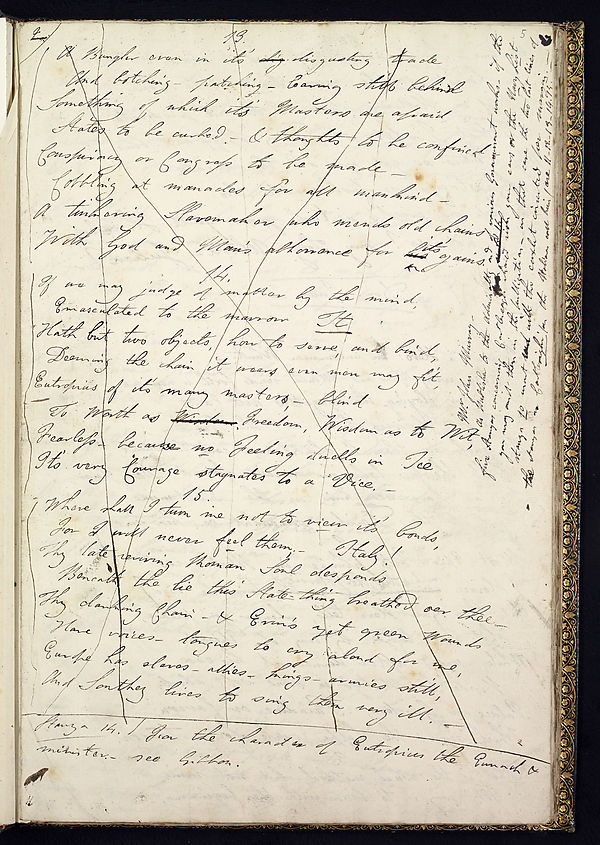
Page from Don Juan manuscript

The Lord Byron papers are made up of the manuscripts, business papers, and correspondence of one of the most significant authors to be published by the House of John Murray – George Gordon Noel Byron, or Lord Byron. This collection is the largest of its kind, containing over 10,000 items related to Byron. On 10 March 1812 Murray published Byron's Childe Harold's Pilgrimage, which sold out in just a few days. This led to Byron's famous reference to its instantaneous success, 'I awoke one morning and found myself famous'. After its publication, Byron and Murray became good friends and their relationship is the reason why the Archive contains more than just Byron's works – his personal papers were collected by the Murray family over the years. This series contains the manuscripts of Childe Harold's Pilgrimage itself as well as manuscripts and drafts of most of Byron's other work, many of which have been put on display at various exhibitions like the National Library of Scotland's 'Such Seductive Poetry' exhibition in 2019 (18 April – 27 July) which featured letters written and received by Byron, as well as the manuscript of Don Juan (cantos I, II and V) with his annotations and additions.
