= George the Younger =

George the Younger may refer to:

- George Bickham the Younger (c. 1706–1771), English etcher and engraver
- George Treby (younger) (1726–1761), British politician
- George Dance the Younger (1741–1825), English architect and surveyor
- George Adams (scientist, died 1795), (1750–1795), English scientist
- George Colman the Younger (1762–1836), English dramatist and miscellaneous writer
- George Gwilt the younger (1775–1856), English architect and writer on architecture
- George Cuitt the Younger (1779–1854), only son of the George Cuitt the Elder
- George Boardman the Younger (1828–1903), son of the Baptist missionaries George Dana Boardman and Sarah Hall Boardman
- George Murray Smith the Younger (1859–1919), chairman of the Midland Railway
- George W. Bush (born 1946), also known as George Bush the Younger, American politician
