= Etymology of chemistry =

The word chemistry derives from the word alchemy, which is found in various forms in European languages.

The word alchemy itself derives from the Arabic word al-kīmiyāʾ (الكيمياء), wherein al- is the definite article 'the'. The ultimate origin of the word is uncertain, but the Arabic term kīmiyāʾ (كيمياء) is likely derived from either the Ancient Greek word khēmeia (χημεία) or the similar khēmia (χημία).

The Greek term khēmeia, meaning 'cast together', may refer to the art of alloying metals, from root words χύμα (khúma, 'fluid') and χέω (khéō, 'I pour'). Alternatively, khēmia may be derived from the ancient Egyptian name of Egypt, khem, khm, khame, or khmi, meaning 'blackness', likely in reference to the rich dark soil of the Nile river valley.

== Overview ==
There are two main views on the derivation of the Greek word. According to one, the word comes from the greek χημεία (chimeía, meaning 'pouring' or 'infusion'), used in connection with the study of the juices of plants, and thence extended to chemical manipulations in general; this derivation accounts for the old-fashioned spellings chymist and chymistry. The other view traces it to khem or khame, hieroglyph khmi, which denotes black earth as opposed to barren sand, and was used by Plutarch as χημία (chimía); on this derivation, the word alchemy is explained as meaning 'the Egyptian art'. The first occurrence of the word is said to be in a treatise of Julius Firmicus, an astrological writer of the 4th century, but the prefix al- must be the addition of a later Arabic copyist. (Note: Among Alexandrian writers, alchemy was designated as hē tēs krusou te kai argurou poiēseōs teknē theia kai hiera or hē epistēmē hiera.) In English, works by Piers Plowman (1362) use the phrase experimentis of alconomye, with variants alkenemye and alknamye. The prefix al- began to be dropped about the middle of the 16th century.

=== Egyptian origin ===
According to the Egyptologist Wallis Budge, the Arabic word al-kīmiyaʾ actually means 'the Egyptian [science]', borrowing from the Coptic word for "Egypt", kēme (or its equivalent in the Medieval Bohairic dialect of Coptic, khēme). This Coptic word derives from Demotic kmỉ, itself from ancient Egyptian kmt. The ancient Egyptian word referred to the country, people, and the colour black (Egypt was the "Black Land", by contrast with the "Red Land", the surrounding desert); so this etymology could also explain the nickname "Egyptian black arts". However, according to Friedrich Mahn, this theory may be an example of folk etymology. Assuming an Egyptian origin, 'chemistry' is defined as follows:

Chemistry, from the ancient Egyptian word "khēmia" meaning transmutation of earth, is the science of matter at the atomic to molecular scale, dealing primarily with collections of atoms, such as molecules, crystals, and metals.

Thus, according to Budge and others, chemistry derives from the Egyptian word khemein or khēmia, meaning the 'preparation of black powder', ultimately derived from the name khem (Egypt). A decree of Diocletian, written about AD 300 in Greek, speaks against "the ancient writings of the Egyptians, which treat of the khēmia transmutation of gold and silver".

=== Greek origin ===
Arabic al-kīmiyaʾ or al-khīmiyaʾ (الكيمياء or الخيمياء), according to some, is thought to derive from the Koine Greek word khymeia (χυμεία) meaning 'the art of alloying metals' or 'alchemy'; in the manuscripts, this word is also written as khēmeia (χημεία) or kheimeia (χειμεία), which is the probable basis of the Arabic form. According to Mahn, the Greek word χυμεία (khumeia) originally meant "cast together", "casting together", "weld", "alloy", etc. (cf. Gk. kheein (χέειν) "to pour"; khuma (χύμα), "that which is poured out, an ingot"). Assuming a Greek origin, chemistry is defined as follows:

Chemistry, from the Greek word χημεία (khēmeia) meaning "cast together" or "pour together", is the science of matter at the atomic to molecular scale, dealing primarily with collections of atoms, such as molecules, crystals, and metals.

== From alchemy to chemistry ==
Later Medieval Latin had alchimia/alchymia ('alchemy'), alchimicus ('alchemical'), and alchimista ('alchemist'). The 16th century mineralogist and humanist Georg Agricola was the first to drop the Arabic definite article al-. In his Latin works from 1530 onwards, he exclusively wrote chymia and chymista in describing activity that we today would characterize as chemical or alchemical. As a humanist, Agricola was intent on purifying words and returning them to their classical roots. He had no intent to make a semantic distinction between chymia and alchymia.

In the late 16th century, Agricola's newly coined terminology gradually came into use. It seems to have been adopted in most of the vernacular European languages following Conrad Gessner's adoption of it in his widely circulated pseudonymous work, Thesaurus Euonymi Philiatri De remediis secretis: Liber physicus, medicus, et partim etiam chymicus (Zurich, 1552). Gessner's work was frequently re-published in the second half of the 16th century in Latin and was also published in a number of vernacular European languages, with the word spelled without the al-.

In the 16th and 17th centuries in Europe, the forms alchimia, chimia and chymia were synonymous and interchangeable. The semantic distinction between a rational and practical science of chimia and an occult alchimia arose only in the early eighteenth century.

In English of the 16th, 17th, and early 18th centuries, both the forms with and without the prefix al- were commonly spelled with i or y, as in chymic, chymic, alchimic, and alchymic. During the later 18th century, the spelling was re-fashioned to use the letter e, as in chemic in English. In English, after the spelling shifted from chimical to chemical, there was a corresponding shift from alchimical to alchemical, which occurred in the early 19th century. In French, Italian, Spanish and Russian today, it continues to be spelled with an i as in, for example, Italian chimica.

== See also ==
- History of chemistry
- History of science
- History of thermodynamics
- List of Arabic loanwords in English
- List of chemical element name etymologies
