= Smith, Elder & Co. =

British book publisher

- Founded: 1816
- Founder: George Smith; Alexander Elder
- Defunct: 1917
- Successor: John Murray
- Country of origin: United Kingdom
- Headquarters location: London
- Publication types: Books, magazines

Smith, Elder & Co., alternatively Smith, Elder, and Co. or Smith, Elder and Co. was a British publishing company which was most noted for the works it published in the 19th century. It was purchased by John Murray in the early 1900s, its archive now kept as part of the John Murray Archive at the National Library of Scotland in Edinburgh, Scotland.

== History ==
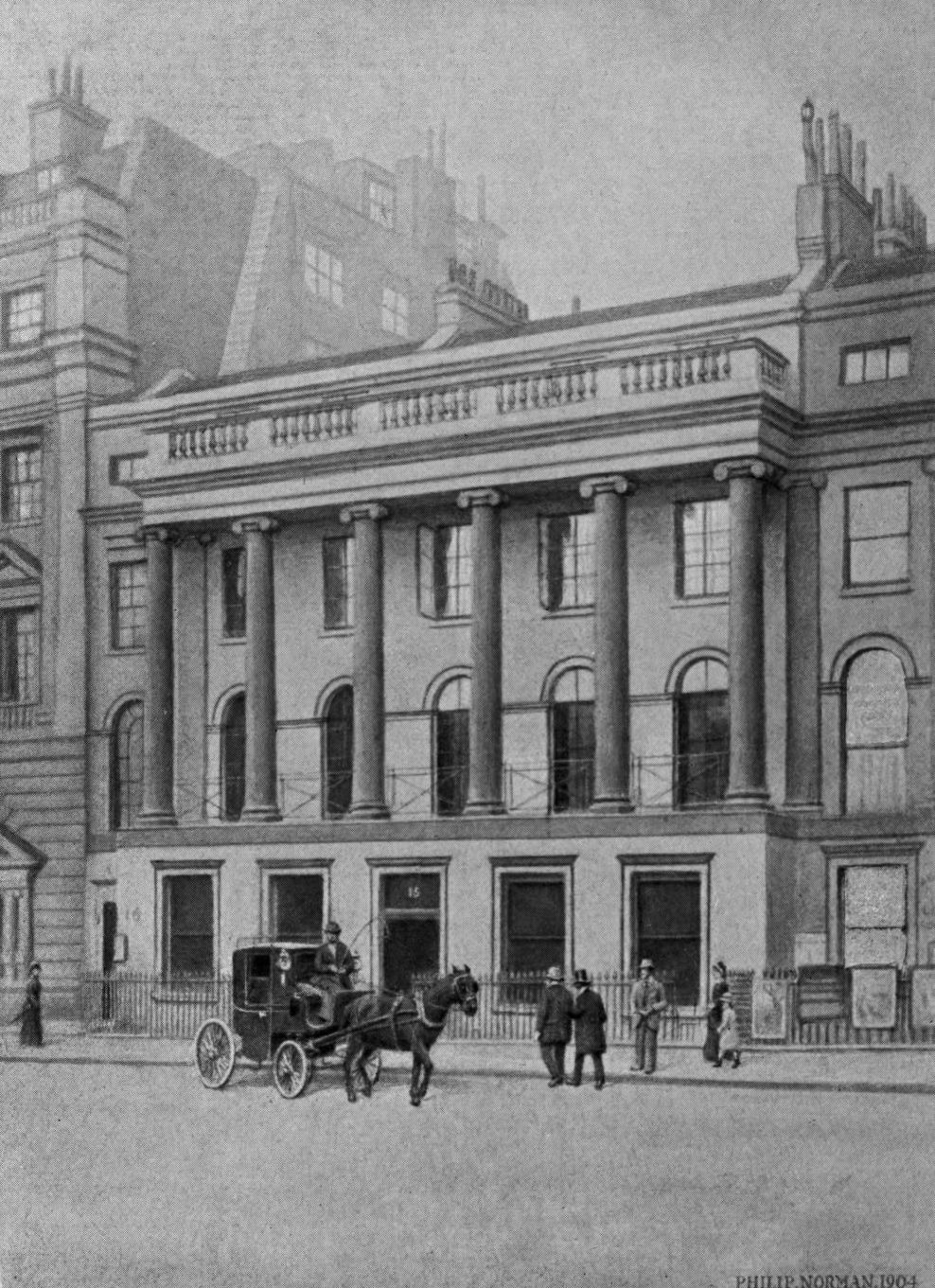
Offices of Smith, Elder & Co. at No. 15 Waterloo Place in London

The firm was founded by George Smith (1789–1846) and Alexander Elder (1790–1876) and successfully continued by George Murray Smith (1824–1901). They are known to have published as early as 1826.

They are notable for producing the first edition of the Dictionary of National Biography (DNB).

The firm achieved its first major success with the publication of Charlotte Brontë's Jane Eyre in 1847, under the pseudonym of "Currer Bell".

Other major authors published by the firm included Robert Browning, George Eliot, Elizabeth Gaskell, Thomas Hardy, Richard Jefferies, George MacDonald, Charles Reade, John Ruskin, Algernon Charles Swinburne, Alfred Tennyson and George Gissing.

In addition, beginning in 1841, they published The London and Edinburgh Magazine. Beginning in 1859, they published The Cornhill Magazine.

In 1909 the firm was being run by Reginald Smith.

== Works published ==
- The Comic Offering volumes one through five by Louisa Henrietta Sheridan, 1831–1835
- Friendship's Offering, 1837
- Illustrations of the Zoology of South Africa by Andrew Smith, 1838–50
- Zoology of the Voyage of H.M.S. Beagle by Charles Darwin, 1838–43
- Modern Painters by John Ruskin, 1843
- Jane Eyre by Charlotte Brontë, 1847
- The King of the Golden River by John Ruskin, 1851
- The History of Henry Esmond by William Makepeace Thackeray, 1852
- The Professor by Charlotte Brontë, 1854
- The Ring and the Book by Robert Browning, 1868–69
- The Mayor of Casterbridge by Thomas Hardy, 1886
- The Great Boer War by Arthur Conan Doyle, 1900
- The Riddle of the Sands by Erskine Childers, 1903
- Morocco in Diplomacy by Edmund Dene Morel, 1912
- Jane Austen: Her Life and Letters, A Family Record by William and Richard Arthur Austen-Leigh, 1913
- The Adventures Of Philip by William Makepeace Thackeray, 1899
- The old South Sea-House by A.W. Rumney, 1914
- The Dalesman by A.W. Rumney, 1936
- The Cyclist`s Guide to the English Lake District by A.W, Rumney, 1899
- Cycle touring (All England series) by A.W. Rumney, 1898

== Book series ==
- Illustrated Editions of Popular Works
- Popular Library
