= Moods (novel) =

1864 novel by Louisa May Alcott

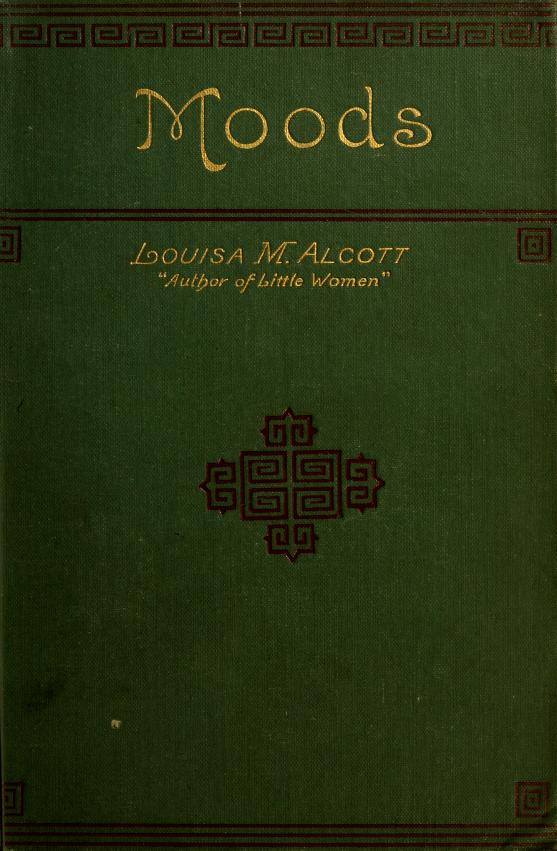
- Cover for the 1890 edition
- Author: Louisa May Alcott
- Language: English
- Genre: Classic fiction
- Publisher: A. K. Loring, Roberts Brothers (first revised edition)
- Publication date: 1864; 1882 (revised)
- Publication place: United States
- Media type: Print
- Text: Moods at Wikisource

Moods is the first novel published by Louisa May Alcott in 1864. She disliked the final result after the editing process and published a revised version in 1882. The novel depicts the life of young Sylvia Yule as she navigates growing from a girl to a woman and seeking true friendship. She meets Geoffrey Moor, who she sees as a dear friend, and Adam Warwick, who she comes to love. When Warwick leaves and Sylvia receives news leading her to think he has married, she accepts Moor's second proposal of marriage and hopes she will learn to love him. After the wedding, Sylvia and Warwick discover their love is reciprocated and work to hide their feelings. Sylvia's health declines as she suppresses herself, but she refuses Warwick's encouragement to tell Moor, thinking it would hurt him too deeply. She finally tells him and he goes off to Europe accompanied by Warwick, who wants to heal their friendship. When Sylvia calls Moor back, the two men are in a shipwreck and Warwick drowns. Upon Moor's return, Sylvia reveals she is sick and dies soon after. In the revised edition, Sylvia is not sick at the end and writes asking Moor to return so they can live together again.

Alcott pulled from her own experiences in her writing; Warwick and Moor are often compared to Henry David Thoreau and Ralph Waldo Emerson respectively. Many interpret the main theme of Moods as marriage, although Alcott herself claimed it was focused on the issues that come from living by impulse rather than principle. Reviewers of the novel worried it was promoting the ease of leaving a marriage and that it was generally against the morals of the time, but others said Alcott was honoring how marriage should be and teaching self reliance. The revised version of Moods was considered an improvement on the original and reviewers claimed it had the charm of Alcott's later books.

== Plot ==
Moods begins in Cuba with Adam Warwick's rejection of the beautiful Ottila, his fiancé of a month, for not living up to his standards. Warwick wants to break the engagement, but Ottila convinces him to allow her a year to reform herself. He promises to return and goes to stay with his friend Moor.

The story then moves to 18-year-old Sylvia Yule, whose mother died when she was young. She is talented and intelligent, but sensitive to her many moods. When her older brother Mark's friends, Geoffrey Moor and Adam Warwick visit, Sylvia is allowed to accompany them on their expedition down the river. Warwick falls in love with Sylvia, but knowing Moor loves her too and believing Sylvia does not return his love, he leaves the area abruptly. In Warwick's absence, Sylvia realizes she is in love with him, but seeking connection, becomes close friends with Moor. Warwick decides to break off his engagement with Ottila early, but during his journey he hears that Sylvia has turned down Moor's marriage proposal, so he decides to reveal his love. Sylvia hears of Otilla's marriage and assumes it was to Warwick, so she accepts Moor's renewed proposal thinking she will learn to love him.

Following the wedding, Warwick finds Sylvia and they confess their love, but quickly acknowledge the hopelessness of their situation and part ways. The next time they see each other, Warwick visits the Moors' home and recognizes Sylvia's difficulty disguising her feelings, so he suggests she tell Moor, but Sylvia refuses to hurt her husband that way. She soon changes her mind, and after revealing her love for Warwick, encourages Moor to take some time traveling. Warwick appears on the dock before Moor's ship leaves and the two leave for Europe together hoping to repair their damaged friendship.

Faith, Moor's cousin, guides Sylvia to the understanding that marrying Moor without loving him was a mistake, but marrying Warwick out of passion would lead to an unequal marriage and Sylvia's loss of independence. With this conclusion, Sylvia returns to her family and devotes herself to her father. Six months later, she calls Moor back to her. Moor and Warwick's journey home is interrupted by their ship sinking, and Warwick dies after helping his friend onto a lifeboat. Rather than a loving reunion upon Moor's return, Sylvia tells him she is sick and dies shortly after.

=== Revised edition ===
Sylvia's brother Mark is called Max in the revised version. Alcott also removed all references to Ottila and her cousin, as well as Warwick's engagement; Warwick is never engaged in the 1882 edition. Additionally, at the end of the novel, rather than dying, Sylvia calls Moor home so they can live together as husband and wife again.

== Themes and analysis ==
Alcott claimed the main theme of Moods is not marriage, but instead "the mistakes of a moody nature, guided by impulse, not principle." Literary historian Sarah Wadsworth interprets the novel as Alcott's response to the idea that love develops or is learned over time after choosing an acceptable person to court. While many "double-proposal" novels utilize the second proposal to resolve existing issues, Sylvia's issue of love for Warwick is made worse by the second proposal, and she realizes love cannot be forced. While Sylvia's refusal to conform to the idea of conjugal love leads to her death in the first edition, the second edition ends with Sylvia learning to live with love and duty "hand in hand".

One interpretation of the novel as a whole is that it addresses the question "What should a woman do when she discovers that she has married a man she cannot love?" The Independent wrote that Moods is a question of "matrimonial metaphysics", or the "difference between conjugal and platonic love". Sarah Elbert, an American literary historian, writes that marriages of Alcott's time were often prone to inequality between partners and Moods suggests that inequality between partners destroys marriages. Alcott herself observed that she saw very few happy marriages. Sylvia's childhood leads her to seek affection and she has not fully matured by the time she marries Moor. She knows she sees him only as a friend and believes she loves Warwick; however, Moor promises to teach her how to love. At Sylvia's death, Alcott wrote that she was relieved of the difficulties caused by life and love, and Elbert compares her suffering to that of Hester Prynne and Jane Eyre, saying all three left home unprepared.

=== Life and literary connections ===
The novel is built from many of Alcott's personal experiences, particularly ideas from the transcendentalism movement on identity and having a "holy cause". The title and quote preceding the story come from "Experience", an essay by Ralph Waldo Emerson. Just as Alcott had access to Emerson's library, her character Sylvia has free access to the library of a "gentle poet", her friend Moor, as a young girl. Warwick is partially modeled on Henry David Thoreau. Alcott researcher Harriet Reisen says photographs of Thoreau and Emerson are accurate to Alcott's descriptions of the two love interests in Moods. She also compares Warwick to Heathcliff of Wuthering Heights and Moor to Mr. Knightley of Emma, and sees Faith Dane as a representation of Margaret Fuller based Alcott's admiration for Fuller and the feminist cause the two share.

== Background & publication history ==
Alcott wrote the first draft of Moods in 1860. She recounts that for four weeks, she wrote all day and often through the night. A few months later, she returned to spending all her time writing in the attic. Her family would bring food and tea as she wrote and revised, barely sleeping. Alcott wrote in her journal that she thought nothing would come of the manuscript but she felt she had to write it. Her sister Anna told her it was good. The publisher of Hospital Sketches had suggested he would take her new book, but he wanted Alcott to edit Moods to be half as long and she refused. After the novel was rejected by Ticknor and Fields, it was set aside for the next year. The Alcott's family friend, Caroline Dall, read the manuscript and facilitated its publication with A. K. Loring.

At first, Alcott was asked again to shorten the book, and she originally resolved not to work on it again. A few weeks later, she journaled about coming up with a way to shorten and rearrange Moods, including the removal of ten chapters, which she said made the novel stronger and more simple. The novel was first published in 1864 following these revisions. The complete original story is unknown as the very first draft is lost, but Alcott wrote in a letter that she originally planned for Sylvia to continue life without her husband or Warwick. Alcott worried that the end result was so far from her original that it was "no more [her] own". Public response encouraged her, although the novel Emily Chester, released around the same time as Moods, had so many similarities it led to accusations of plagiarism.

Given her recent popularity as a children's author, Alcott tried to avoid another edition of Moods being published in case its morals reflected differently on her current reputation, but Loring owned the copyright and released an 1870 edition. After Loring's business failed, Alcott bought the copyright back for one dollar and subsequently made extensive changes for a new edition, which was published in 1882. These included changes which she had originally refused to make. In the end, Alcott wrote in a letter she felt she damaged the book trying to shorten and fit it to so many outside opinions.

== Reception ==
Moods was "received positively by the public; however, several reviewers commented the story was unrealistic and read more like a story created to make a point. The Commonwealth said Alcott showed talent, but there was too much moralizing in the writing. Reviews frequently compared it to Emily Chester, another novel released around the same time which readers found to be remarkably similar in plot and characters. The Springfield Daily Republican suggested in their review that Alcott was sincere in her idea that a marriage should be left if love is missing, but said marriage should be considered irreversible. Author Henry James disliked Sylvia's separation from her husband after realizing she loves another man more, although he thought the second half of the book was particularly well written. Harriet Beecher Stowe later said the book was "injurious in its tendency." Others generalized that the book neglected common moral standards of the day. Caroline Dall, who helped get Moods published, worried that it would be a problematic read for young women because it advocated lighter treatment of the commitments of engagement and marriage. The Reader, contrary to other reviews, claims Moods promotes marriage with "sanctity". They also praise the humor and wit with which the book is written. Aside from moral concerns, Harper's Weekly said the novel had a message of self-reliance.

=== 1882 Revised edition ===
The revised edition, which came after Little Women, was generally said to be an improvement on the first edition, although The Literary World called both the initial release and the revision a failure. The Critic wrote that leaving out some of the drama in the revised version of Moods made it more "dignified" and equally as enjoyable. They called the omission of Sylvia's death the correction of "a literary and moral mistake". The Springfield Daily Republican commented the removal of Warwick's engagement made him a more consistent character but not necessarily more realistic. The Boston Courier suggested the revised version had the same charm as Alcott's other later books.

== Works cited ==
- Alcott, Louisa May (1991). Elbert, Sarah (ed.). Moods, Louisa May Alcott; edited and with an introduction by Sarah Elbert. Rutgers University Press. ISBN 0-8135-1669-2.
- Bannett, Nina (2007). "'Unrighteous Compact': Louisa May Alcott's Resistance to Contracts and Promises in Moods". In De Jong, Mary; Yarington, Earl (eds.). Popular Nineteen-Century American Women Writers and the Scholars Publishing. Cambridge Scholars Publishing. pp. 351–370. ISBN 9781847182326.
- Deese, Helen R. (2003). "Louisa May Alcott's 'Moods': A New Archival Discovery". The New England Quarterly. 76 (3): 439–455. doi:10.2307/1559810. JSTOR 1559810.
- Elbert, Sarah (1987). A Hunger for Home: Louisa May Alcott's Place in American Culture. Rutgers University Press. ISBN 0-8135-1199-2.
- Lyon Clark, Beverly (2004). Louisa May Alcott The Contemporary Reviews. Cambridge University Press. ISBN 978-0521827805.
- Wadsworth, Sarah (2015). "Unsettling Engagements in Moods and Little Women; or, Learning to Love Louisa May Alcott". In Eiselein, Gregory; Phillips, Anne K. (eds.). Critical Insights: Little Women. Ipswich, Massachusetts: Grey House Publishing. ISBN 978-1-61925-427-5.
- Reisen, Harriet (2009). Louisa May Alcott: The Woman Behind Little Women. Henry Holt and Company, LLC. ISBN 978-0-8050-8299-9.
