= The Comic Offering =

British periodical, 1831–1835

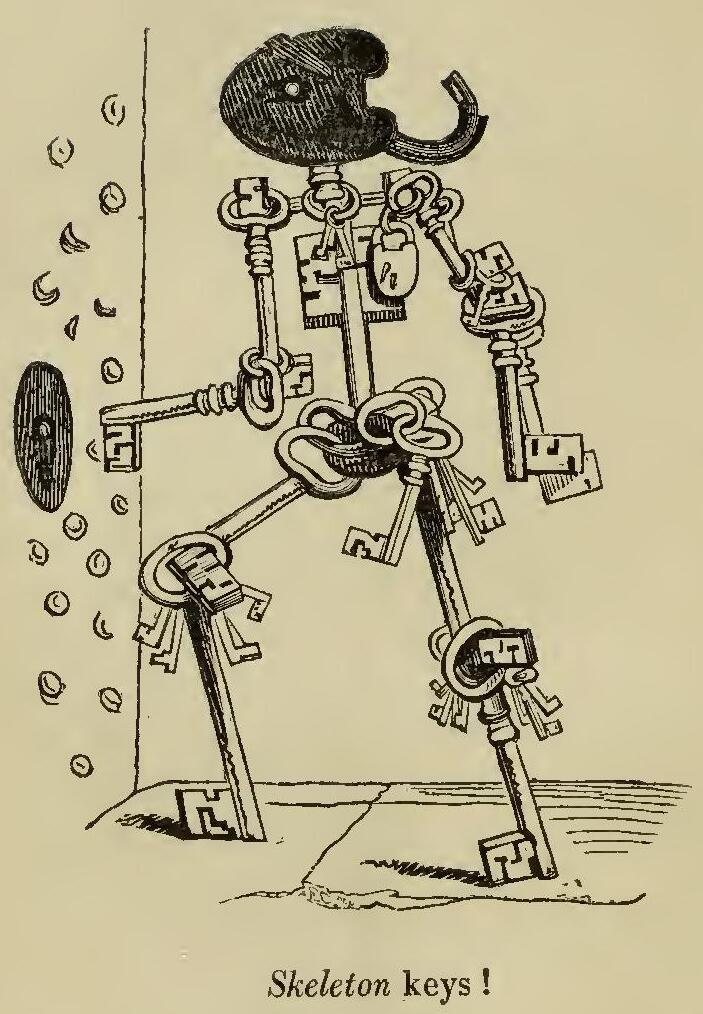
A cartoon from The comic offering

The Comic Offering, or Ladies' Melange of Literary Mirth is a literary annual consisting of five volumes from 1831 to 1835 edited by Louisa Henrietta Sheridan and published by Smith, Elder & Co. The first volume was the first British humor publication written, illustrated, and edited by a woman.

The pieces in each volume, consisting of both short fiction and poetry, satirize the everyday lives of men and women and the stereotypes and gender roles placed upon them by society. Robert Seymour designed the frontispieces of volumes one, four, and five and contributed illustrations for volumes one through four.

Sheridan's health declined after the fifth volume was released and she ceased working on the annual. There is no indication that anyone stepped in to continue the annual in some form afterward or after her death in 1842.

== Critical response ==
A review of The Comic Offering, by the Dublin Penny Journal, 1834

While the illustrations and wit received grudging praise, it was considered highly unusual for a woman to be writing humor at the time. Critics did not doubt that a woman could entertain other women, but the annual's genre compelled them to question her gentility and morality, with most reviews making sure to point out her gender. Some compared it unfavorably to other humor annuals written by men.
