= Louisa Henrietta Sheridan =

English writer and illustrator (1810–1841)

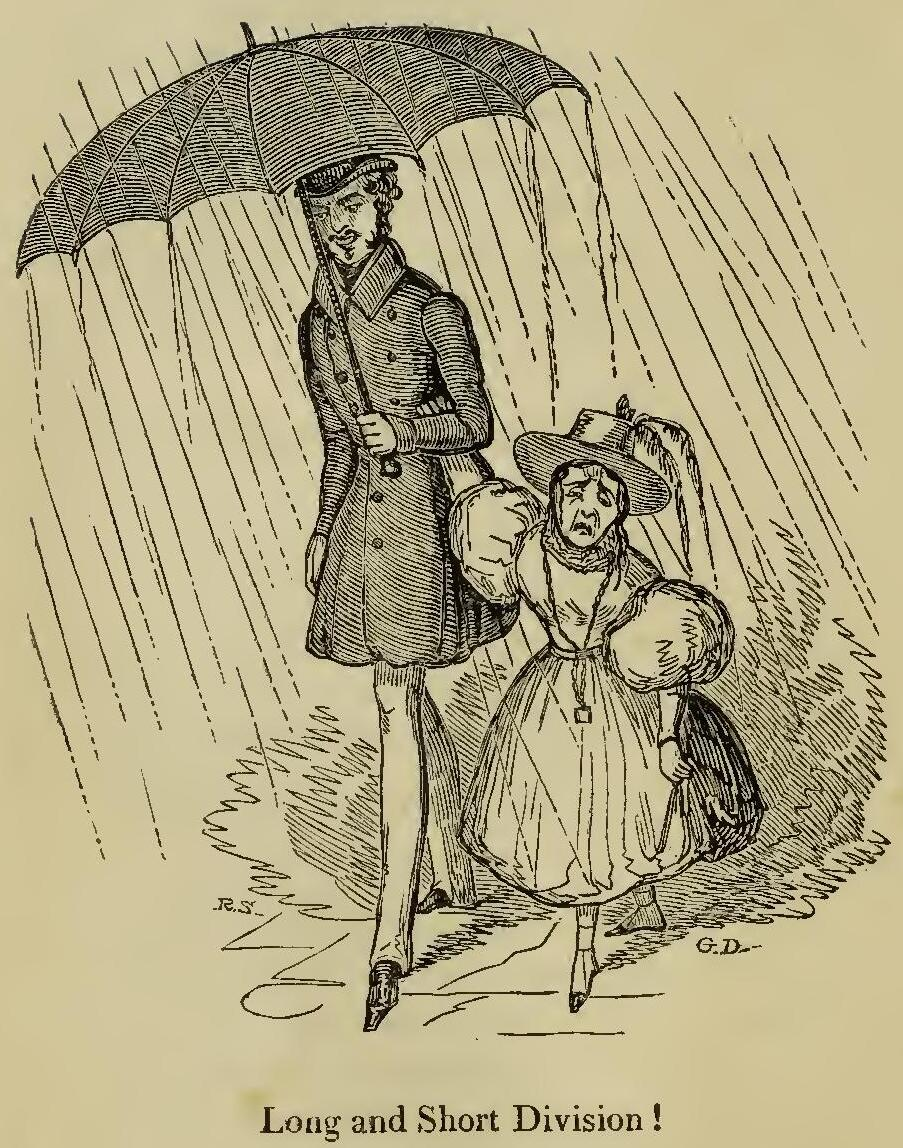
A cartoon from The comic offering

Louisa Henrietta Sheridan (1810 – 2 October 1841) was an English writer and illustrator. Her most well-known work, published by Smith, Elder & Co., is the literary annual, The Comic Offering, for which she served as editor and contributor from 1831 to 1835. She also edited The Diadem, a Book for the Boudoir (London, 1838).

Louisa Henrietta Sheridan was born in Amlwch, Isle of Anglesey, Wales, the only daughter of Captain William Brownlow Sheridan and Louisa Mary Addison. She married Lieutenant-Colonel Sir Henry Robartes Wyatt in France on 8 September 1840. She died in Paris one year later from consumption, aged 31.

A review of The Comic Offering, by the Dublin Penny Journal, 1834
