= Lost Sir Massingberd =

Novel by James Payn

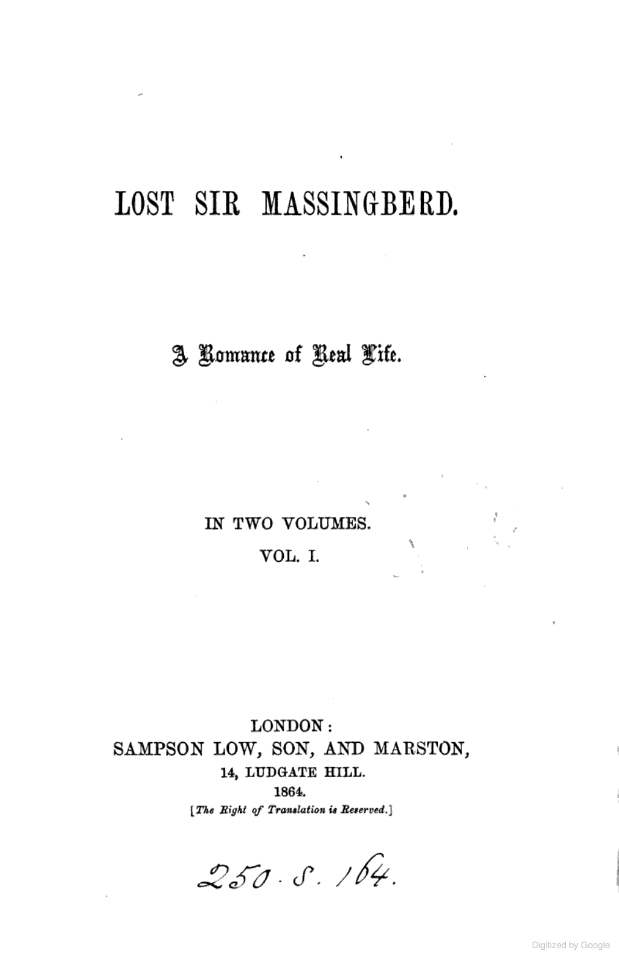
- Title page
- Author: James Payn
- Published: 1864
- Publisher: Sampson, Low, Son, and Marston

Lost Sir Massingberd: A Romance of Real Life is a novel by James Payn. It was published serially in the columns of Chambers's Journal, a popular periodical. It was published as a book in two volumes in 1864.

The novel centres on Sir Massingberd Heath, a villainous English landowner whose entailed estate and murderous schemes drive the plot. It has been considered the best of Payn's stories and was among the earliest and most popular of his works. According to Helen Rex Keller, it is "a modern tale of English country life, told with freedom, humor, and a certain good-natured cynicism."

== Characters ==
The central figure is Sir Massingberd Heath, a tyrannical landowner. His nephew Marmaduke Heath is the heir to his entailed estate and the novel's principal victim of his schemes. Harvey Gerard and his daughter Lucy are Marmaduke's close friends; Lucy later becomes Marmaduke's wife. A gipsy woman, secretly married to Sir Massingberd in his youth, also figures prominently in the story.

== Plot ==
Sir Massingberd Heath neither feared God nor regarded man. His property was entailed, the next heir being his nephew Marmaduke, whom he tries to murder in order to sell the estates. Marmaduke is befriended by Harvey Gerard and his daughter Lucy, falls in love with Lucy, and finally marries her. Sir Massingberd in his youth secretly married a gipsy, whom he drove mad with his cruelty. She curses him: "May he perish, inch by inch, within reach of aid that shall not come." Sir Massingberd disappears, and all search for him is vain; many months later his bones are found in an old tree, known as the Wolsey Oak. It was supposed that he climbed the tree to look about for poachers, that the rotten wood gave way, and he slipped into the hollow trunk, whence he could not escape. Had he not closed up the public path which skirted the tree, his cries for help must have been heard. With his disappearance and death all goes well with the households on which the blight of his evil spirit had fallen, and the story ends happily.

== Appraisal ==
This novel, which has been considered the best of this novelist's stories, was one of the earliest, and one of the most popular. According to Helen Rex Keller, "It is a modern tale of English country life, told with freedom, humor, and a certain good-natured cynicism."

== Sources ==
- Birch, Dinah, ed. (2009). "Payn, James". In The Oxford Companion to English Literature. 7th ed. Oxford University Press. Retrieved 22 October 2022.
- Payn, James (1864). Lost Sir Massingberd: A Romance of Real Life. 2 vols. London: Sampson, Low, Son, and Marston. (Vol. 1. Vol. 2.)

Attribution:

- Keller, Helen Rex (1924). "Lost Sir Massingberd". In The Reader's Digest of Books. The Library of the World's Best Literature. New York: The Macmillan Company. p. 520.
