= George Murray Smith the Younger =

George Murray Smith DL JP (4 February 1859 – 18 April 1919) was an English businessman who was chairman of the Midland Railway from 1911 until his death.

He was the son of George Murray Smith, the publisher. He was educated at Harrow School; and Jesus College, Cambridge. In 1885 he married Ellen Strutt, youngest daughter of Edward Strutt, 1st Baron Belper. They had three sons, two of whom were killed during World War I, and a daughter. He was appointed as a deputy lieutenant of Leicestershire in April 1903.
