= Anne Moncure Crane =

American novelist

Anne Moncure (Crane) Seemüller (January 7, 1838 – December 10, 1872) was an American novelist, who wrote books such as Emily Chester, Opportunity and Reginald Archer., which were about female sexual desires. Her novels were considered controversial in some quarters of post-Civil War American society. The author Henry James was influenced by Crane's books. She was an important writer in early American realism.

== Early years ==
Crane was born in Baltimore, Maryland in 1838. She was the daughter of William and Jean Niven Daniel (Crane). Her father founded the Richmond (Virginia) African Baptist Missionary Society along with two black clergymen, in 1815, and was a successful merchant. Her mother was part of the Stone family of Maryland. It was founded by William Stone, the third Governor of Maryland and close ally of Lord Baltimore. William Stone's grandson, Thomas Stone, had signed the Declaration of Independence - an illustrious connection that later was attached to one of Crane's literary characters. Crane was taught by a local pastor, the Reverend N.A. Morrison. She graduated in the year 1855.

== Career ==
Crane completed Emily Chester, her first novel, in 1858; when it was published six years later in 1864, it became surprisingly popular. The book went through 10 editions and was published in Europe as well as the United States. A dramatic play based on the book was created, exploiting the intriguing new set-up that Crane had introduced – the respectable woman tempted to the verge of adultery, and the resulting effect that the moral predicament has on her personally.

Opportunity, her second book, was published at the close of 1867. While it failed to achieve the popularity of Emily Chester, it was warmly received. Poet Paul H. Hayne wrote in one review, published in a Southern magazine:

"This is no common romance. Depending but slightly upon the nature of its plot and outward incidents, its power is almost wholly concentrated upon a deep, faithful, subtle analysis of character. Indeed, it is rather a series of peculiar psychological studies, than a novel in the ordinary sense of the term.
Two male characters brothers divide the reader's interest. One is a brilliant, susceptible, but frivolous nature, possessing, no doubt, capacities for good, yet too feeble to arrest and to develop them. The other is a strong, passionate, manly, upright soul, who, in the blackest hours of misfortune and doubt, feels that there are instinctive spiritual truths which a man must cling to, would he avoid destruction. These brothers, so diverse in temperament, encounter and fall in love with the same woman.
We close our notice of Miss Crane's production with the remark that no tale has recently appeared, North or South, which is so full of rich evidences of genuine psychological power, a profound study of character in some of its most unique spiritual and mental manifestations, and fervid artistic aspirations, destined to embody themselves gloriously in the future."

In 1869, she wrote the novel Little Bopeep, which told about a young woman, who wasn't ordinary.

Before the publication of her three novels, Crane wrote several short stories for the Galaxy and Putnam's Monthly. In 1873, a collection of miscellaneous essays was published posthumously.

Crane's third book was Reginald Archer, published in 1871. Literary historian Arthur Habegger claimed that the protagonist of this novel, Christie Archer, was the inspiration for The Portrait of a Lady by Henry James.

Crane died in Stuttgart, Germany.

After her death, The Nation published an obituary, expressing the hope that her immoral influence would cease and that her novels no longer be printed. This wish was fulfilled, and her novels went out of print, and soon she had disappeared from a literary record.

== Private life and Death ==
Crane married Augustus Seemüller, a New York merchant, in 1869; they left Baltimore to settle in New York City. She suffered for most of her adult life from chronic hepatitis. This led her to leave New York and travel across Europe to different treatment centers in the years leading up to her death. She died at a treatment center in Germany on December 10, 1873, at the age of thirty-four.
