= Carl August Friedrich Mahn =

German philologist and language teacher

Carl August Friedrich Mahn (September 9, 1802 – January 27, 1887) was a German philologist and language teacher and researcher.

Mahn was born in Zellerfeld. In 1828 he became a foreign-language teacher in Berlin, but he gained note mainly for his investigation into etymologies. He published several books on the subject as well as contributing extensively to the etymologies in the 1864 edition of the English-language Webster's Dictionary. He also published several textbooks for learners of French, English, Italian, Latin, and ancient Greek, as well as works on a variety of other linguistic and literary subjects. He died in Steglitz in 1887.
