= Emily Chester =

1864 novel by Anne Moncure Crane

Emily Chester: A Novel
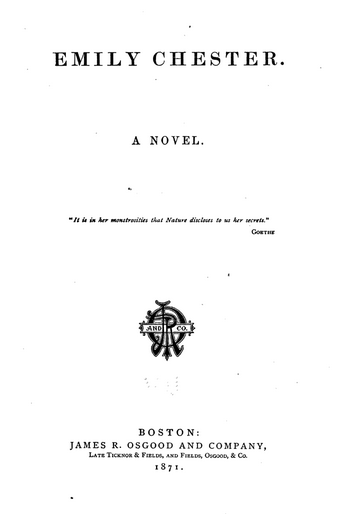
- 1871 edition
- Author: Anne Moncure Crane Seemüller
- Language: English
- Genre: novel
- Published: 1864
- Publication place: U.S.A.
- Media type: Print

Emily Chester was an American novel written by Anne Moncure Crane in 1864. It was published without a word of preface to give the least hint of the whereabouts of the author, and was not covered with the pall of a Great Southern Novel! as was usually the mode novels by Southern writers were announced. It had made a reputation in Boston before it was announced that the author was a lady of Baltimore.

== Background ==
In 1858, when Crane was 20, she competed with a number of her friends to see who could write the best novel. (Note: The other writers in the group were Miriam Coles Harris, the author of Rutledge, and Harriet Prescott, the author of The Amber Gods.) The result of the friendly competition was the work that would set Crane upon her distinguished path – the novel Emily Chester. When the novel was completed, it was taken to Messrs. Ticknor & Fields, Boston, by a writer who was a stranger to them. She was told that they could not even entertain the idea of publishing it, as they were overcrowded with previous engagements; but upon her urging the point, she was politely allowed to leave the book for inspection. Within two weeks from that time they sent a contract for its publication, addressed to the "Author of 'Emily Chester; and it was not until Crane returned the paper signed in full that they knew the name of the writer whose novel they had bound themselves to publish. Nevertheless, the first edition was published anonymously. On the title page is a quotation from Goethe, "It is in her monstrosities that Nature discloses to us her secrets."

From the first, the book attained success. The publishers were scarcely able to supply the demand. More than this, four editions were issued by leading English publishers and the story was translated into German, meeting a reception in the cultured circles of the European world. The novel was dramatized by George H. Miles and exceeded popularity by presentation upon the stage. The entire chorus of reviewers, including names of eminence, were enthusiastic and almost untempered in their praise. Probably no book ever written by a Maryland woman met with more marked success. To a certain extent the work was autobiographical in character, it being an article in Miss Crane's literary creed that a novel is effective just in so far as the elements of autobiography enters into its creation.

== Plot ==
The opening scenes of this book, and some that are most interesting, are placed in Maryland. At the heart of the work was the dilemma of the title character, who married a respectable, if boring, middle class gentleman, and later fell in love with a more dashing man of her community. The fierce moral debate that subsequently raged inside Emily - whether to stay faithful to her husband, or to pursue her passion for her real love - eventually had a deleterious effect on her physical health. A conclusion came about, morbidly, with Emily's death.

== Characters ==
It has been said that the characters are drawn from life. Whether they be drawn from individual lives or otherwise, they are delineated with a bold and masterly hand, equal to the task. In "Emily Chester," the author is said to have idealized herself. "Certainly," said a friend of that writer, "the glorious hair that crowned the head of Emily Chester belonged to Anne Crane."

== Critical reception ==
"New and Original Novel" was the heading of an article in the Boston Transcript, written by Edwin Percy Whipple, the essayist, in which he says:—

"The most notable characteristic of this book, published by Ticknor & Fields, entitled 'Emily Chester,' is its originality, and it will give novelreaders a really novel impression. All the usual elements of romantic interest are avoided, and new elements, heretofore but slightly hinted in English novels, are made the substance of the work. Since Goethe's 'Elective Affinities,' we are aware of no story in which the psychology of exceptional sentiment and passion is represented with such keenness and force as in ' Emily Chester.' The play of sympathy and antipathy, in recesses of the mind where will exerts no controlling influence, is exhibited with a patient, penetrating, and intense power, which fastens the reader's somewhat reluctant and resisting attention, and compels him to take interest in what has no natural hold on his healthy sympathies. The character of Emily Chester is not a pleasing one, but it is deeply conceived and vigorously developed. Max Crampton and Frederic Hastings are also types of character strongly individualized, and the contrasted magnetism they exert on the mind and heart of the heroine is vividly represented. The interest and power of the novel are concentrated in these three persons. The other characters are rather commonplace, and seem to be thrown in simply to give relief to the passions of the principal personages. In those parts in which the author is not analyzing and representing the strange mental phenomena which constitute the fascination of the book, she shows immaturity both of thought and observation... Emily Chester' exhibits such palpable mastery of illusive phases of passion difficult to fix and portray, that it cannot fail to make a profound impression on the public."

The Hon. George H. Hilliard reviewed the book thus:—

"We have a work of remarkable originality and power, certainly in these' qualities entitled to rank side by side with the best productions of American genius in the department of fiction. The interest of the book is entirely derived from psychological sources, that is, from the delineation of character, and not from the incidents of the narrative, which are of a commonplace character, and with hardly the merit of probability. It reminds us of two works of fiction of a past age, Godwin's 'Caleb Williams,' and Goethe's 'Elective Affinities,' but more of the latter than of the former. Indeed, 'Emily Chester' could hardly have been written had not the 'Elective Affinities' been written before it. We may be sure that the writer of the former is familiar with the latter. Imagine the 'Elective Affinities,' with a distinct moral aim superadded, and written with the intensity and consecration of Godwin, and we get a tolerably fair impression of ' Emily Chester.' .... Emily Chester is a young woman of radiant beauty and extraordinary mental powers. One of her lovers is a man of iron will and commanding intellect, from whom she nevertheless recoils with an unconquerable physical or spontaneous repulsion. The temperament of the other is in harmony with her own; she is happy in his presence, and yet she is ever conscious of his intellectual inferiority, and thus resists the influence of his nature upon hers." Here is the whole web and the woof of the novel It is unquestionably a work of genius. It is fair to add that it is a very sad story throughout, and thus not to be recommended to those who have sorrows enough of their own not to make them crave the books that make them grieve. It is a web in which flowers of gold and purple are wrought into a funeral shroud of deepest black. "The heroine is an impossible creature. She is a combination of Cleopatra, Harriet Martineau, and Florence Nightingale. She is a being as supernatural or preternatural as a centaur or griffin. She is a blending of irreconcilable elements. She is represented as choosing between one lover who satisfies her intellect, and another who gratifies her temperament, as coolly as she would between a pear and a peach at a dessert. Human beings are not so made. You cannot run a knife between the intellect and the sensuous nature in this way; nor can we think Max Crampton and Frederic Hastings are true to nature. They are to real men what Ben Jonson's characters are to Shakspeare's: they are embodiments of humors, and not living flesh and blood. .... And we need hardly add that it is not a healthy book. We lay it down with a feeling in the mind similar to that produced on the body by sitting in a room heated by an air-tight stove. .... But, as has been said, there is only one kind of book which cannot be endured, and that is the stupid kind, the book that bores you. 'Emily Chester' will never fall under this condition, for it is a book of absorbing interest. From the first chapter the author seizes the attention with the strong grasp of genius, and holds it unbroken to the last. And when the end comes, we lay the book down with a sort of sigh of relief at the relaxation of fibres stretched to a painful degree of tension."

To show the attention this novel attracted among the intellectual portion of the North, the following was a criticism from "Gail Hamilton" of New England:—

"The very common fault of this book will have a tendency to conceal from the popular gaze its uncommon excellence. It has all the millinery of a third-rate American novel—the most abounding beauty in its women, perfect manly grace in its men, fabulous wealth surrounding the important personages, with a profusion of elegant appurtenances which, at the present rates of gold, reads like an Arabian Night's entertainment . In style it is sometimes careless, sometimes slightly coarse, and not unfrequently labored. It constantly falls into the vulgar error of making all of its outside women pretty, gossiping, envious, malignant, and hateful, with only here and there a gleam of faint and altogether flickering sunshine, as if womanly splendor were not sufficient of its own shining, but must be set off against a black background. The conversations are sometimes spun out to undue length, and it indulges too largely in philosophy and generalizations. Yet even these drawbacks have their own compensations. The remarks and reflections, if sometimes a little impertinent, are generally sensible and shrewd, indicating an uncommon depth and clearness of insight. The conversations would occasionally be improved by abridgment; but they are earnest and high-toned. ....

"I do not know that American novel literature has produced any other work of the kind. Miss Sheppard's 'Counterparts' offers, so far as I can recollect, the only resemblance to be found in the English language. But discarding all resort to hard-featured fathers, mercenary mothers, family feuds, and all manner of circumstances, go directly inward, and find in the eternal mystery of the complex human being all the obstacle, the passion and purpose which life requires. This will not, perhaps, add to the popularity of the book; but it makes its power. It may, indeed, be a stone of stumbling and a rock of offence to those conservative novel-readers who love to have a story go on in the good old paths, with which they have become so familiar that they can see the end from the beginning. It is so comfortable to know of a surety that the villain will come to grief, and the knight to joy, however stormy may be the sea of troubles on which he is tossed. All present pain is viewed with a tranquillity inspired by foreknowledge of future happiness. But this book thrusts in upon all these easy-going ways. A beautiful woman, of her own free will, marries a man who is passionately and most unselfishly devoted to her, whom she holds in profound respect and reverence, yet with a feeling little short of loathing. What newfangled notion is this? Alasl it is newfangled only in novels, not in life, and it is only by failing to recognize these subtle yet all-powerful facts, that life has so much confusion. The most careful students, as well as mere casual observers, may fail to comprehend them; but we have learned much when we have learned that there is mystery, that nature has her laws, impalpable but imperative, by obedience to which life is perfected, and by disobedience destroyed; that, deeper down in the heart of man than any words can penetrate, are forces against which it is useless for even the will to contend.

"'Emily Chester' presents this theory in what seems to be an exaggerated form. Perhaps, to state a truth, it is necessary to overstate it. The motto of the title-page avows this: 'It is in her monstrosities that nature discloses to us her secrets.' Max and Emily are scarcely so much man and woman as an impersonation of magnetism. But granting their existence, they act according to rigid natural laws. They are often melo-dramatic; there is a certain overdoing of attitude, gesture, and expression, as if a youthful hand had traced the windings of Emily's inward experience, her changing relations to Max, the effects of his absence and presence, the mingled distrust, repentance, regard, and gratitude. Such things come by special revelation. Emily herself is pure, and pure womanly, an intensified woman drawn with much skill and an infinite pity, sympathy, and tenderness. Her mirth, her coquetry, her gentleness and wilfulness, her great heart-hunger and brainpower, her passionate tastes and distastes, are a mighty relief after the bread-and-butter heroines who mostly trip it through even our good novels. Max is as great an anomaly, in his way, as Emily in hers. From time immemorial the self-immolation has been appointed to woman; but this man, opening his eyes to the evil his indomitable will had wrought upon the woman most dear to him, gave himself a living sacrifice for atonement. With stern, unwearied self-denial, he bore the sharpest pain, if so he may bring to her a gleam of peace. He will have more disciples in his sin than in his suffering; but it is well to know that such a thing is possible, even in conception."

== Adaptations ==
In Henry James and the "Woman Business" (2004), writer Alfred Habegger accuses Henry James of plagiarizing Crane's novels after her death and rewriting them under his own name. He believes that a scathing anonymous obituary was in fact written by James who had every reason, he contends, to want her forgotten:—

"For the unknown writer of this shockingly nasty death notice, Seemüller [Crane] was a monster of such power and proportions that it was necessary, publicly, to drive a stake through her heart. It was essential that this novelist never rise again. What better authorization would James have needed for his slightly risky enterprise of appropriating and rewriting Seemüller's novels? She was dead and buried ... It would be a civilized and responsible act to turn her shapeless and immoral narratives into a novel of rounded perfection."
