= James Payn =

English novelist and editor (1830–1898)

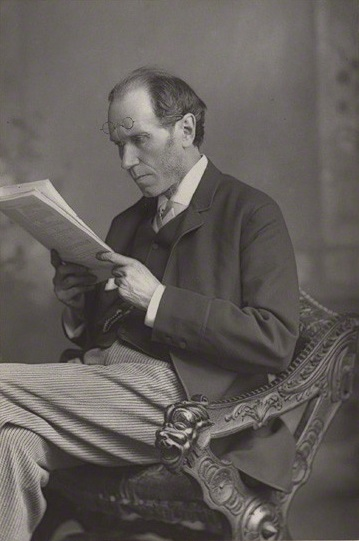
- James Payn, by W. & D. Downey, carbon print on card mount, 1890.
- Born: 28 February 1830 near Maidenhead, Berkshire, England
- Died: 25 March 1898 (aged 68); Maida Vale, London, England
- Education: Trinity College, Cambridge
- Spouse: Louisa Adelaide Edlin

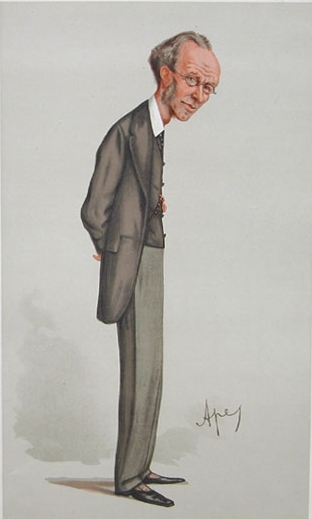
"The Heir of the Ages" Payn as caricatured by Ape (Carlo Pellegrini) in Vanity Fair, 8 September 1888

James Payn (/peɪn/; 28 February 1830 – 25 March 1898) was an English novelist and editor. Among the periodicals he edited were Chambers's Journal in Edinburgh and the Cornhill Magazine in London.

== Family ==
Payn's father, William Payn (1774/1775–1840), was clerk to the Thames Commissioners, and at one time treasurer to the county of Berkshire. Payn was educated at Eton and then entered the Military Academy at Woolwich, but his health was unequal to a military career and he proceeded in 1847 to Trinity College, Cambridge. There he was among the most popular men and served as president of the Union. Before going to Cambridge he had published some verses in Leigh Hunt's Journal, and while still an undergraduate put out a volume of Stories from Boccaccio in 1852 and one of Poems in 1853.

In the year Payn left Cambridge, he met and soon married Miss Louisa Adelaide Edlin (born 1830 or 1831), sister of Judge Sir Peter Edlin, later chairman of the London Quarter Sessions. They had nine children, the third of whom, Alicia Isabel (died 1898), married The Times editor George Earle Buckle.

== Editor and novelist ==
Payn then settled down in the Lake District to a literary career and contributed regularly to Household Words and Chambers's Journal. In 1858 he moved to Edinburgh to act as joint editor of the latter, and became its sole editor in 1860 with much success for 15 years. Meanwhile, he moved to London in 1861. In the Journal he published in 1864 his most popular story, Lost Sir Massingberd. Thereafter he was engaged in writing novels, including Richard Arbour or the Family Scapegrace (1861), Married Beneath Him (1865), Carlyon's Year (1868), A County Family (1869), By Proxy (1878), A Confidential Agent (1880), Thicker Than Water (1883), The Canon's Ward (1883), A Grape from a Thorn, The Talk of the Town (1885), and The Heir of the Ages (1886).

In 1883 Payn succeeded Leslie Stephen as editor of the Cornhill Magazine and continued there until his health broke down in 1896. He was also literary adviser to Messrs Smith, Elder & Company. His publications included a Handbook to the English Lakes (1859), and various volumes of essays: Maxims by a Man of the World (1869), Some Private Views (1881), Some Literary Recollections (1884). His posthumous work The Backwater of Life (1899) revealed much of his personality through kindly, sensible reflections on familiar topics. He died in London on 25 March 1898. A biographical introduction to The Backwater of Life was provided by Sir Leslie Stephen.

== Works ==
=== Articles ===
- "The Critic on the Hearth", The Nineteenth Century, Vol. V, January/June 1879.
- "An Indo-Anglian Poet", The Gentleman's Magazine, Vol. CCXLVI, January/June 1880.
- "Two Infant Phenomenons", The Gentleman's Magazine, Vol. CCXLVI, January/June 1880.
- "Sham Admiration in Literature", The Nineteenth Century, Vol. VII, January/June 1880.
- "The Pinch of Poverty", The Nineteenth Century, Vol. VII, January/June 1880.
- "Success in Fiction", The North American Review, Vol. 140, No. 342, May 1885.
- "On Conversation", The Nineteenth Century, Vol. XLII, July/December 1897.
- "On Old Age", The Nineteenth Century, Vol. XLII, July/December 1897.

=== Short stories ===
- "The Midway Inn", The Nineteenth Century, Vol. V, January/June 1879.
- "Uncle Lock's Legacy", Short Stories, Vol. XI, September/December 1892.
- "A Successful Experiment", Short Stories, Vol. XI, September/December 1892.
- "Rebecca's Remorse". In Short Stories from "Black and White", Chapman & Hall, 1893.
- "A Faithful Retainer". In Stories by English Authors, Charles Scribner's Sons, 1901.

=== Novels ===
- The Foster Brothers (1859)
- The Bateman Household (1860)
- Richard Arbour: or, The Family Scapegrace (1861)
- Lost Sir Massingberd (1864)
- Married Beneath Him (1865)
- The Clyffards of Clyffe (1866)
- Mirk Abbey (1866)
- Lights and Shadows of London Life (1867)
- Bentinck's Tutor, One of the Family (1868)
- Blondel Parva (1868)
- Carlyon's Year (1868)
- A County Family (1869)
- A Perfect Treasure (1869)
- Found Dead (1869)
- Gwendoline's Harvest (1870)
- Like Father, Like Son (1871)
- Not Wooed, but Won (1871)
- A Woman's Vengeance (1872)
- Cecil's Tryst (1872)
- At Her Mercy (1874)
- The Best of Husbands (1874)
- Walter's Word (1875)
- Fallen Fortunes (1876)
- Halves (1876)
- What He Cost Her (1877)
- Less Black Than We're Painted (1878)
- By Proxy (1878)
- Under One Roof (1879)
- A Confidential Agent (1880)
- From Exile (1881)
- A Grape from a Thorn (1881)
- For Cash Only (1882)
- Kit: A Memory (1883)
- Thicker Than Water (1883)
- The Canon's Ward (1884)
- The Talk of the Town (1885)
- The Luck of the Darrells (1885)
- The Heir of the Ages (1886)
- The Mystery of Mirbridge (1888)
- A Prince of the Blood (1888)
- The Eavesdropper (1888)
- The Burnt Million (1890)
- The Word and the Will (1890)
- A Modern Dick Whittington (1892)
- A Stumble on the Threshold (1892)
- A Trying Patient (1893)
- In Market Overt (1895)
- The Disappearance of George Driffell (1896)
- Another's Burden (1897)

=== Non-fiction ===
- Some Literary Recollections, 1884.
