= George Smith (publisher, born 1789) =

George Smith (1789 – 21 August 1846) was a Scottish born publisher who co-founded, along with Alexander Elder, the British publishing company Smith, Elder & Co.

== Biography ==
=== Early life ===
George Smith was born in Scotland in 1789. His father was a small landowner in the County of Moray. His father died while he was very young, and the property, badly managed by an uncle, was lost before George came of age. As a young man George was apprenticed to Isaac Forsyth, a bookseller and banker in the town of Elgin, Moray. While still young George moved to London with no resources beyond his own power to work. He was by nature hard working and conscientious, and made steady progress after coming to London. He first found employment in the publishing house of Rivington in St. Paul's Churchyard. His next employer was the famous publisher John Murray. While working for Murray, he was once sent to deliver proof sheets to Lord Byron.

=== Career ===
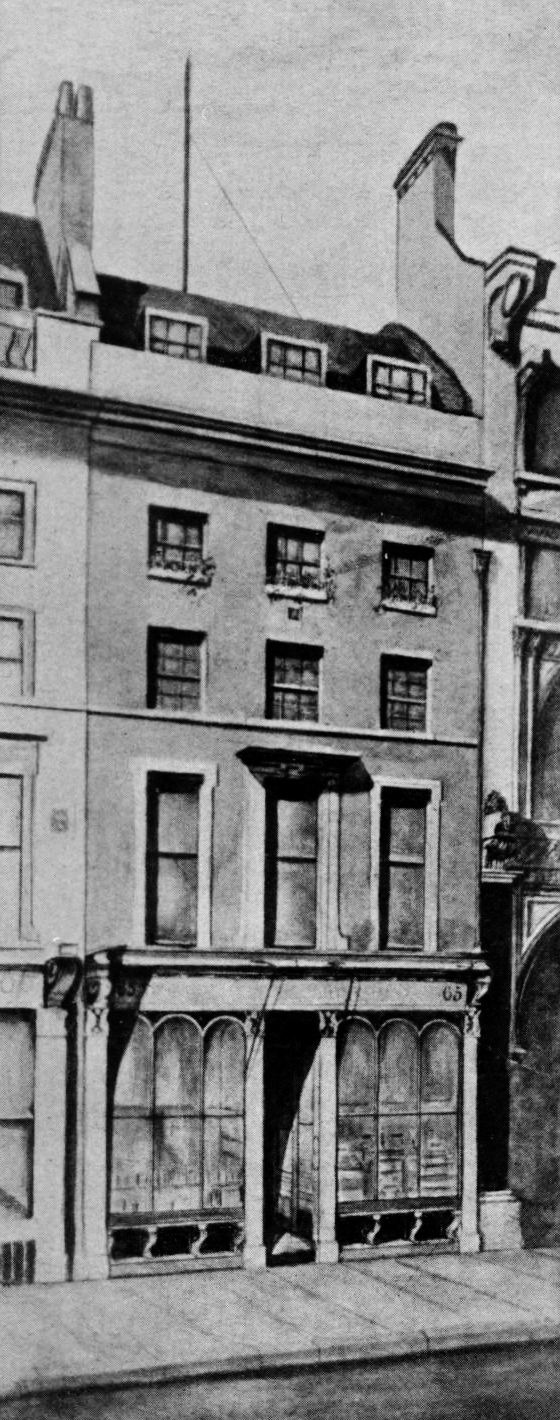
The offices of Smith, Elder & Co. at No. 65 Cornhill

In 1816 George and another Scottish immigrant to London, Alexander Elder, a native of Banff, Aberdeenshire, set up as partners in a small business. They opened shop at 158 Fenchurch Street as booksellers and stationers. The new firm was called Smith & Elder. After 3 years, the partners added publishing to the other branches of their business. In March 1819 they were admitted to the Worshipful Company of Stationers and Newspaper Makers. Membership in the company was necessary to the pursuit of publishing in London. On 19 July 1819 Smith & Elder entered their first publication in the Stationer's Company register. This was a collection of sermons and expositions by John Morison.

George Smith was married on 12 October 1820 to Elizabeth Murray, the daughter of Alexander Murray, a successful glass-ware manufacturer in London. The young couple lived over the Smith & Elder shop in Fenchurch Street, and it was here that their second son (of 6 children) George Murray Smith was born on 19 March 1824.

Later in 1824 the firm of Smith & Elder was moved to No. 65 Cornhill, London. After this move the firm was joined by a third partner and acquired its permanent designation of Smith, Elder & Co. Their new partner had important connections in India, and he brought to the firm the new department of an Indian agency. The firm began their Indian operations with the export of books and stationery to officers of the East India Company, and eventually expanded into banking and the export of other commodities. The firm's Indian interests came to be the most important and lucrative branch of their business.

=== Later life ===
In the 1830s the publishing department of Smith, Elder & Co. won an assured reputation. The firm published a wide variety of items, including novels, translations, pamphlets, and collections of prints. In 1838 George Murray Smith joined the firm, where George Smith gave him a thorough training in the business. In 1841 George moved the family to a home in Denmark Hill. In 1843 George Murray Smith was allowed to assume control of the publishing interests of Smith, Elder & Co.

At the end of 1844 George Smith fell ill from cerebral softening. He moved from Denmark Hill to a small farm at Boxhill. He was unable to attend to the business of the firm, and his place was taken by George Murray Smith soon after he came of age in 1845. George Smith died at the age of 57 in August 1846.
