= Felix Holt, the Radical =

1866 novel by George Eliot

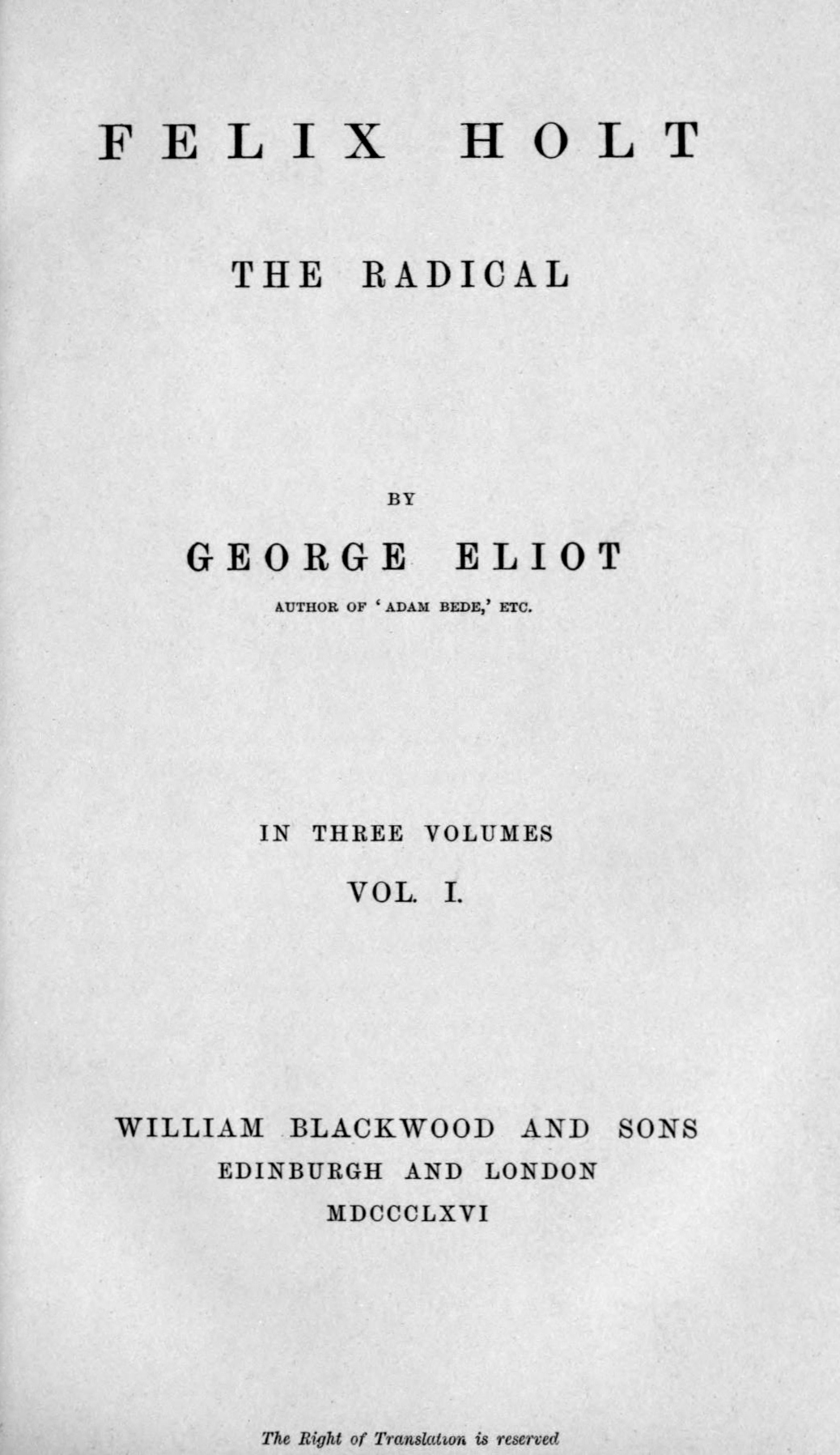
- Title page of the first edition, 1866
- Author: George Eliot (Mary Ann Evans)
- Language: English
- Genre: Social novel, political novel
- Set in: English Midlands, at the Time of the 1832 Reform Act
- Published: 1866
- Publisher: William Blackwood and Sons
- Publication place: United Kingdom
- Media type: Print
- Preceded by: Romola
- Followed by: Middlemarch

Felix Holt, the Radical is an 1866 social novel and political novel by the English author George Eliot. The novel deals with political conflicts in a small English town at the time of the 1832 Reform Act. The plot centres on an election in which Harold Transome, a local landowner, runs for the "radical cause" for tactical reasons, contrary to his family's conservative tradition. Transome's opportunism is contrasted by Felix Holt, a young working-class man who rebels against the corruption and injustice of his time. Another plotline concerns Esther Lyon, the stepdaughter of a nonconformist clergyman, who is the true heiress to the Transome estate without knowing it. She must ultimately choose between a future with Harold Transome or Felix Holt. Her choice symbolizes the novel's central conflict between different lifestyles and social ideas.

== Overview ==
=== Synopsis ===
The story takes place in the fictional community of Treby in the English Midlands in 1832, at the time of the First Reform Act. Harold Transome, a local landowner, has returned home after a fifteen-year trading career in the Middle East and is now running for Parliament for the North Loamshire constituency. However, contrary to his family's conservative traditions, he intends to run as a Radical. This alienates him from his traditional allies and throws his mother, Mrs. Transome, into despair. Harold Transome gains the support of his conservative uncle, the rector of Little Treby, and hires his family lawyer, Matthew Jermyn, as his campaign agent.

Much of his campaign focuses on Treby Magna. In this village lives Felix Holt, who has recently returned to live with his mother after extensive travels in Glasgow. He meets Rev. Rufus Lyon, a nonconformist clergyman in Treby Magna, and his stepdaughter Esther. Felix and Mr. Lyon quickly become friends, but he seems to treat Esther with condescension. Both Felix and Rev. Lyon are inclined to the radical cause.

Harold Transome learns that Jermyn has mismanaged the Transome estate and embezzled money for himself. Transome remains silent during the election, but Jermyn tries to devise a plan to protect himself from future prosecution. Meanwhile, in the nearby mining town of Sproxton, Felix observes campaign activities for the radical cause. He is angered by the "treating" of workers with beer in exchange for their vocal support. Felix shares his concerns with Harold Transome, who reprimands John Johnson for his campaign methods. However, Jermyn convinces Transome not to intervene.

Rev. Lyon learns from Maurice Christian, the servant of the conservative candidate Philip Debarry, about the possible identity of Esther's biological father and decides to tell Esther the truth about her father. Esther's outlook on life changes when she learns that she is actually Rev. Lyon's stepdaughter. Her relationship with her stepfather deepens as she also strives to meet the high moral standards that Felix Holt has instilled in her. As Felix Holt sees the change in Esther's character, he begins to fall in love with her. However, both share the feeling that they are destined never to marry each other. Meanwhile, Rev. Lyon challenges Rev. Augustus Debarry to a theological debate. The debate is initially agreed upon but canceled at the last minute.

On election day, riots break out in Treby Magna. Drunken miners from Sproxton attack townspeople and wantonly destroy property. Felix Holt is caught up in the riots and tries to lead the miners away from the town. In the end, however, Felix Holt is charged with manslaughter of a policeman who was trying to quell the riots. Harold Transome loses the election to Debarry.

Harold Transome takes legal action against Jermyn for his mismanagement of the Transome estate. Jermyn counters by threatening to reveal the true owner of the Transome estate to the public. However, Maurice Christian informs the Transomes that the true owner of the estate is actually Esther Lyon. Harold Transome invites her to the Transome estate, hoping to persuade her to marry him. Harold and Esther develop a good relationship, and Esther also becomes more compassionate towards Mrs. Transome, whose despair has deepened. Esther feels torn between Harold Transome and Felix Holt. She compares a life of comfortable wealth with Harold Transome to a life of personal growth in poverty with Felix Holt. Meanwhile, at Felix Holt's trial, Rev. Lyon, Harold Transome, and Esther Lyon all vouch for his character, but he is still found guilty of manslaughter. Harold Transome and the Debarrys work to obtain a pardon for Felix Holt.

Harold Transome proposes marriage to Esther Lyon, with the eager support of Mrs. Transome. But despite Esther's feelings for Harold and Mrs. Transome, she rejects the proposal. In a confrontation between Jermyn and Harold Transome, it is revealed that Jermyn is Harold Transome's father. Harold no longer considers himself worthy of marriage to Esther. Esther also relinquishes her claim to the Transome estate. Felix Holt and Esther Lyon marry and move away from Treby with Rev. Lyon. Matthew Jermyn is eventually ruined and moves abroad. The Debarrys remain friends with the Transomes, and the past is never spoken of.

=== Characters ===
- Felix Holt: An idealistic young working-class man who works as a watchmaker and fights against social injustice.
- Harold Transome: A wealthy landowner who returns to his homeland after a long absence and runs as a Radical for his constituency in the parliamentary elections.
- Esther Lyon: The educated stepdaughter of a clergyman who becomes the heiress to a large estate and stands between two suitors.
- Rev. Rufus Lyon: A nonconformist clergyman and Esther's stepfather, who befriends Felix Holt.
- Matthew Jermyn: The Transome family lawyer and Harold's biological father, who harbours dark secrets.
- Mrs. Transome: Harold's mother, who manages the family estate and has a complicated past.
- Maurice Christian: A shady servant who possesses important information about Esther's origins and the Transome estate.
- John Johnson: A campaign agent whose questionable methods lead to a riot.
- Thomas Trounsem: An impoverished relative of the Transomes, whose death triggers Esther's inheritance.
- Sir Maximus Debarry: A conservative baronet and neighbor of the Transomes, who plays an important role in Felix's pardon.
- Rev. Augustus Debarry: A clergyman and brother of Sir Maximus Debarry.
- Philip Debarry: A conservative politician who wins the election and secures Felix's pardon.

== Themes ==
=== Ethical radicalism vs. political activism ===
The protagonist Felix Holt's supposed radicalism has been interpreted differently by literary critics. While Felix is presented as a political radical, doctrinaire Marxists argue that his radicalism is severely limited. His position is characterized less by political activism than by moral convictions. George Jacob Holyoake referred to him as "The Chartist of Positivism without a throb of indignation at political subjection."

Felix's radicalism does not manifest itself in revolutionary zeal, but in his conscious decision to remain part of the working class despite a possibility of social advancement through education. "I mean to stick to the class I belong to," he declares early in the novel, and later affirms, "I'd rather have the minimum effect, if it's of the sort I care for, than the maximum of effect I don't care for" (144, ch.5.). This stance contrasts with the typical upward mobility pattern of many protagonists in industrial novels.

Felix Holt's political thinking bears remarkable similarities to Samuel Bamford's "Passages in the Life of a Radical" (1839–41), a work that Eliot consulted extensively during her research for the novel. Bamford's rejection of riots and physical violence, his constitutionalism, and his insistence on legality find clear parallels in Felix Holt.

=== Class consciousness and social criticism ===
The novel portrays three political groups: the local Tories led by the aristocratic Debarrys, the liberal Radicals around Harold Transome, and the workers of Sproxton Hamlet. Eliot shows a critical, sometimes dismissive attitude towards all political camps – from the nobility to the bourgeoisie to the workers, all classes are portrayed as corrupt or foolish.

Felix, as a working-class intellectual, occupies a special role. Unlike the often less self-reflective protagonists of the industrial social novel, he has developed his ideals through conscious engagement. He rejects social mobility on an individual level and argues for collective progress: "That's how the working men are left to foolish devices and keep worsening themselves; the best heads among them forsake their born comrades" (557, ch. 45).

=== Education as a prerequisite for political maturity ===
Felix is skeptical of parliamentary reforms and fears that even universal suffrage could only lead to continued dominance of the ruling class. This fear stems from his observation of the upper class's manipulation of the electoral system and the fact that mere changes to electoral law do not necessarily change the underlying power structures.

Felix therefore emphasizes the need for education before political power. His position is based on the conviction that the working class will only be able to exercise its political power effectively and independently through sufficient education, instead of being instrumentalized by other classes. This is particularly evident in the scene where workers from Sproxton are bribed with alcohol for political purposes – an example of the manipulation of uneducated voters that Felix wants to prevent.

This attitude has been interpreted by some critics as politically conservative or even "apolitical." Felix's conviction that the working class must be prepared for political power through sufficient education shifts the focus from immediate political actions to a long-term moral reformation of society. Felix sees power mainly in public opinion and proposes a postponement of the extension of suffrage to the working class in favor of a moral renewal of society – an approach that is less politically than ethically motivated.

Felix's perspective focuses from the beginning on long-term, relatively local improvement work rather than revolutionary upheavals. Felix rarely talks about strikes or unions and even tries to end the only riot he is involved in. His approach is based on the conviction that sustainable social change can only be achieved by raising the level of education and critical awareness of the working class.

Although Eliot's solution – influencing public opinion instead of immediate political reforms – may seem naive, her assertion that purely electoral reform will not shift real power to the workers proves prophetic in light of subsequent history. Her attention to the conditions for effective influence of an independent working class represents an advance over the tradition of the industrial novel, which often sees the solution to social problems in a return to a form of paternalism.

=== Secular devotion and transcendence of individual life ===
A central motif in Felix Holt, The Radical is the idea of secular devotion and overcoming individual interests in favor of a larger social whole. Felix embodies this secular form of devotion in his self-chosen commitment to the education of the working class. Felix understands his personal sacrifice as part of a broader historical and social development. This theme – devotion to something greater than one's own self – is also found in Eliot's later novel Daniel Deronda.

This transcendent dimension is concretized in the marriage between Felix and Esther. Their connection legitimizes a devotion to the progress of the working class and illustrates how personal relationships and social commitment can be intertwined. However, Felix's concrete professional work remains comparatively vague: he cleans watches, teaches some boys, and has conversations with local workers, but never formulates a viable social vision or a concrete action plan.

=== Domesticity as a vocation ===
The novel structure suggests that domestic life, in particular, plays more than just a supporting role in the conflict between individual concerns and the common good. This becomes particularly clear in the portrayal of Rufus Lyon, whose professional vocation as a Dissenter preacher is overshadowed by his decision to create a home for a French Catholic woman and her daughter. By making a surrogate home for these quasi strangers, Lyon finds a higher calling, characterized by an unexpected confluence of passion and self-sacrifice.

In Victorian culture, there are numerous depictions of housekeeping as a spiritually inspired vocation. Domesticity is not seen as a leisure activity or as an antithesis to industrial production; the home is not an antidote to the capitalist workplace or a place of material consumption, but, in the 19th-century sense, a profession with a vocational character.

=== Legitimization through willingness to sacrifice ===
The domestic narrative of romance, marriage, and home is crucial to show that Felix's political commitment amounts to more than a failed attempt to stop a riot. His greatest contribution to the realization of his ideals is the effect he has on Esther – the only available evidence of Felix's work. Esther not only literally legitimizes Felix's vocation by defending him at his trial, but also by attributing her own psychological character development to him.

At the novel's climax, Esther faces a choice: to marry Harold Transome and accept her rights to the Transome estate or to renounce her claims and hope for a life at the side of the selfless and therefore morally superior Felix. From a practical point of view, her position as mistress of the Transome estate and heiress to the family fortune would certainly have offered her a practical means of doing much good – the possibility of a career in philanthropy. What morally justifies Esther's decision is not primarily the prospect of concrete charitable results, but – similar to Felix – her willingness to sacrifice per se. Her renunciation of material wealth symbolizes more than just personal self-denial; it stands for the conscious turn towards a more modest but authentic and socially significant way of life.

=== Protestant values and gender roles ===
Felix embodies a secular variant of Protestant virtues in the novel. His statement that he cannot expect to see the fruits of his particular work, since he cares for "very small things, such as will never be known beyond a few garrets and workshops" (p. 557) illustrates this attitude. Cohen interprets this appreciation of the everyday and inconspicuous as an expression of a secularized Protestant understanding of work that combines professional commitment with domestic care.

The novel relativizes the importance of traditional gender roles, although these are typically central in Victorian narratives about domestic life. By emphasizing Protestant values, "Felix Holt" forgrounds moral vocation instead. Although the text certainly addresses gender differences, it treats them as superficial categories that distract from the actual vocation. Cohen analyzes this using an illuminating dialogue between Felix and Esther: when Felix claims that women rarely choose deprivation voluntarily, Esther cleverly counters that women can only choose between various "lesser things" anyway. With this rhetorical turn, she transforms Felix's supposedly gender-specific argumentation into a universal discussion about vocation and devotion. The novel thus refutes the gender difference and suggests that true vocation lies beyond such categories.

== Historical background ==
In terms of content, the novel draws on Eliot's extensive research into the labor movement in the early 19th century. In her diary, she noted, for example, that she had read passages from Samuel Bamford's "Passages in the Life of a Radical" (1839–41) during the writing process. Bamford's moderate radicalism – his rejection of violence, his advocacy of legal reforms, education, and moral self-improvement – is clearly reflected in the character of Felix Holt.

Influences from contemporary political theories are also evident in "Felix Holt, The Radical" Eliot's friend Frederic Harrison, a representative of applied Comtism, argued that political improvements could primarily be achieved through moral and intellectual education of the working class. Although Eliot does not unreservedly adopt Harrison's positive attitude towards social science and represents a rather skeptical view of the intellectuals of her time, a certain proximity to his paternalistic ideal of social reform is noticeable.

The main character Felix Holt found a particular aftereffect in the later published text "Address to Working Men, by Felix Holt" which appeared in a conservative magazine without clear authorship. The fictional appeal emphasizes cultural and ethical education as a prerequisite for responsible political participation – an idea that appealed to bourgeois readers. At the same time, the text implicitly contains a message that emphasizes solidarity among workers and the right to resist exploitation.

== Position in literary history ==
The position of Felix Holt, the Radical in literary history is subject to various interpretations, with the work being considered a social novel, a tragedy, and a romance.

=== Felix Holt as a social novel ===
Although the title "Felix Holt, the Radical" suggests a political orientation, literary critics argue that the work should not primarily be understood as a political novel in the classical sense. Unlike authors such as Disraeli, Trollope, or Gaskell, who propagated political ideologies or denounced social grievances, Eliot focuses less on party-political disputes or the detailed depiction of misery and exploitation. Instead, she brings the individual fates and moral conflicts of her characters to the fore. The political events, especially the election campaign, lose importance as the plot progresses, while the personal tragedy of the protagonists takes center stage.

Instead, "Felix Holt" is often categorized as an industrial novel, a subcategory of the social novel, describing a literary movement that dealt with the social and political effects of industrialization in the mid-19th century. Critics, however, point out that industrial novels generally tended to downplay the importance of class struggles and strive for a harmonious coexistence of classes based on paternalistic structures. These novels often portrayed radical labor movements as failures, criticized parliamentary politics as ineffective, and hoped for a moral renewal of the ruling class and the working class to enable a renewed form of class cooperation.

A key feature of traditional industrial novels is the depiction of class reconciliation, often through the integration of working-class characters into the ruling class or through a moral renewal of the aristocracy. In Felix Holt however, this reconciliation does not take place. The shortening of Felix's prison sentence through the intervention of the nobility does not bring about a profound change in class relations.

Eliot thus breaks with conventions by portraying Felix Holt as a convinced radical who remains true to his principles and does not integrate into the existing system. Class differences also persist. At the end of the novel, Esther and Felix marry and move away. The management of the Transome estate is not further addressed. This shows the irrelevance of the nobility to the social development that Eliot wants to highlight.

=== Felix Holt as a tragedy ===
Shortly before working on Felix Holt George Eliot was intensively involved with poetic drama, which is reflected in the tone, structure, and characterization of the novel. The influence of Greek drama is particularly evident in the way personal conflicts are brought into focus. The political plot level serves more as a framework to highlight these internal and family tensions than as the narrative core itself. Some literary scholars, such as George R. Thomson, argue that Eliot originally conceived the tragic fate of Mrs. Transome and her son Harold as the central motif and integrated the contemporary political elements later.

The tragic character of the novel has been widely discussed. While Mrs. Transome's past and its effects on Harold exhibit traits of a classic Nemesis constellation, it is difficult to read Harold himself as a tragic figure – his calculating courtship of Esther is more reminiscent of a comedic portrayal.

=== Felix Holt as a romance ===
In addition to its analysis as a social novel and tragedy, Felix Holt can also be considered a romance. The novel employs typical motifs of this genre, such as the conflict between a rich but morally questionable suitor and a poor but honest hero. The heroine, Esther, undergoes a moral development and renounces her inherited fortune to support Felix. She saves him from a harsh punishment by testifying on his behalf in court, thus living up to her biblical role model, Esther.

== Film, TV, or theatre adaptations ==
In 1915, a black and white silent film called Felix Holt was produced.

BBC Radio produced a three-part adaptation of Felix Holt in 2007, written by Michael Eaton.

== Reception ==
After the lack of success with Romola George Eliot returned to the more familiar English provincial setting for Felix Holt, the Radical and resumed her publishing relationship with Blackwood's Magazine. Both George Henry Lewes and John Blackwood were reportedly enthusiastic about the prospect of a novel dealing with current affairs. However, upon the story's publication, criticism was leveled at its less than substantial focus on politics.

The reception of Felix Holt, the Radical has been and continues to be mixed. Critics who particularly appreciated Eliot's observational skills for characters and settings consider the novel one of her lesser works. Critics who are interested in the literary depiction of class conflicts accuse the novel of treating these themes too superficially or distorting them.

Edwin Bowen, a representative of the first camp, believed that the novel marked the beginning of George Eliot's "period of decline." He lamented the absence of the "magic, the enchantment, the idyllic charm" that had distinguished Eliot's earlier works such as Adam Bede and Silas Marner. He also criticized that the message conveyed was not carried by "fervent zeal and burning eloquence" and that Eliot's "clumsy prophet of social reform" had failed to improve the world.

Social critics, on the other hand, criticize that Felix Holt is reduced to a mere "puppet" for George Eliot's fears regarding radical mass movements. They criticize that the novel has replaced the potentially threatening public sphere of class struggle and political violence with a conventional, domestic-themed plot centered on a female protagonist.

In contrast to this critical stance, Hobson emphasizes that Felix Holt, the Radical is unjustly underestimated in literary criticism. He particularly acknowledges Eliot's visionary portrayal of the "labor pioneer" as a pioneering literary figure that sharpens awareness of the long-term significance of engagement in the labor movement.
