= Middlemarch =

1871–1872 novel by George Eliot

Middlemarch, A Study of Provincial Life
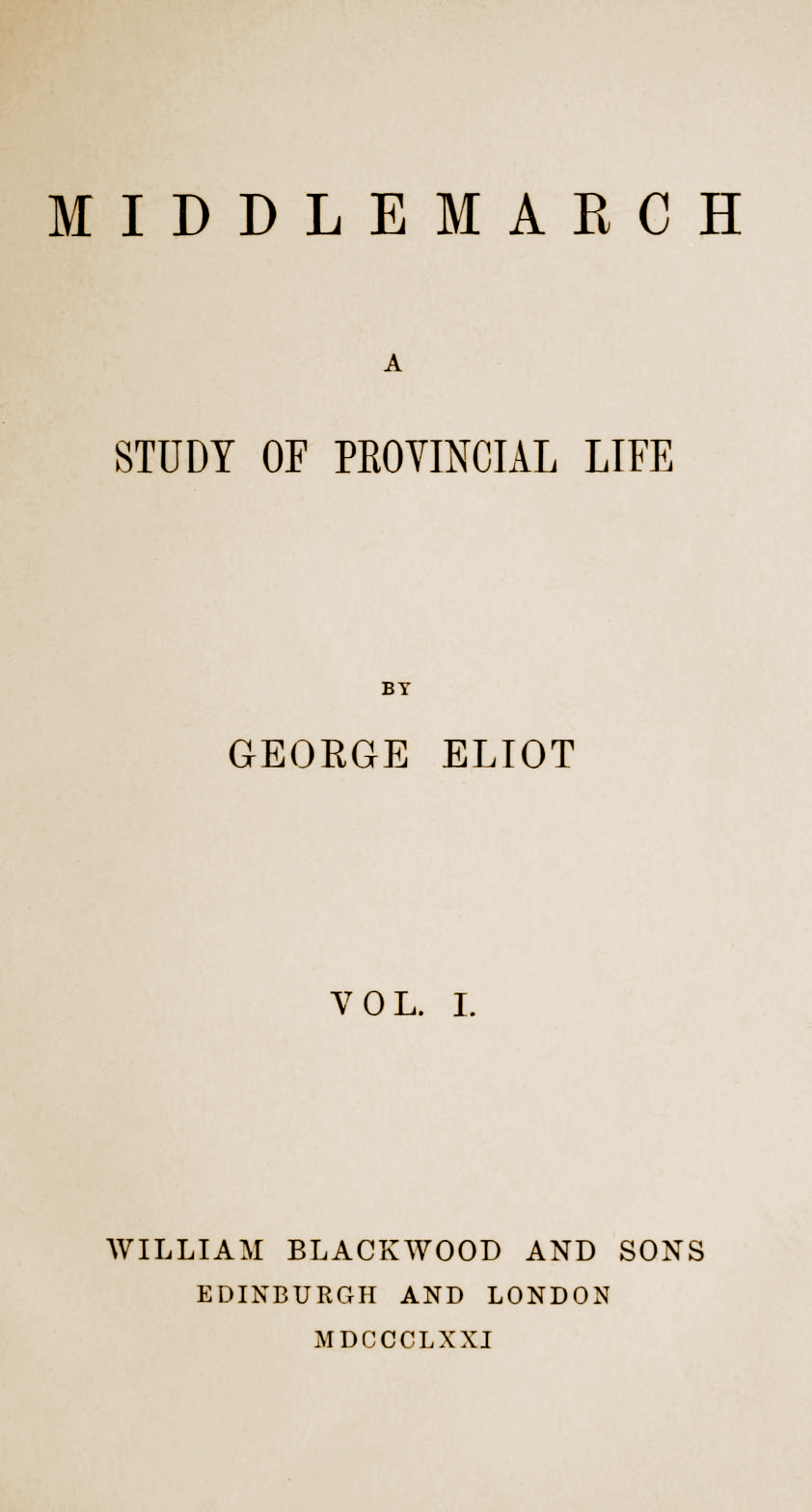
- Title page of the first edition, 1871–1872
- Author: George Eliot (Mary Ann Evans)
- Working title: Miss Brooke
- Language: English
- Genre: Novel
- Set in: The English Midlands and briefly Rome, September 1829 – May 1832
- Published: 1871–1872
- Publisher: William Blackwood and Sons
- Publication place: United Kingdom
- Media type: Print
- Dewey Decimal: 823.8
- Preceded by: Felix Holt, the Radical
- Followed by: Daniel Deronda
- Text: Middlemarch, A Study of Provincial Life at Wikisource

Middlemarch, A Study of Provincial Life is a novel by English author George Eliot, the pen name of Mary Ann Evans. It appeared in eight paper-bound instalments from December 1871 to December 1872, with a book version in four volumes published in parallel (the first volume is dated 1871 and the other three are dated 1872).

Set in Middlemarch, a fictional English Midlands town, from 1829 to 1832, it follows distinct, intersecting stories with many characters. Issues include the status of women, the nature of marriage, idealism, self-interest, religion, hypocrisy, political reform, and education. Leavened with comic elements, Middlemarch approaches significant historical events in a realist mode: the Reform Act 1832, early railways, and the accession of King William IV. It looks at medicine of the time and reactionary views in a settled community facing unwelcome change. Eliot began writing the two pieces that formed the novel in 1869–1870 and completed it in 1871. Initial reviews were mixed but, seventy years later, it was considered as her best work and one of the great English novels.

== Background ==
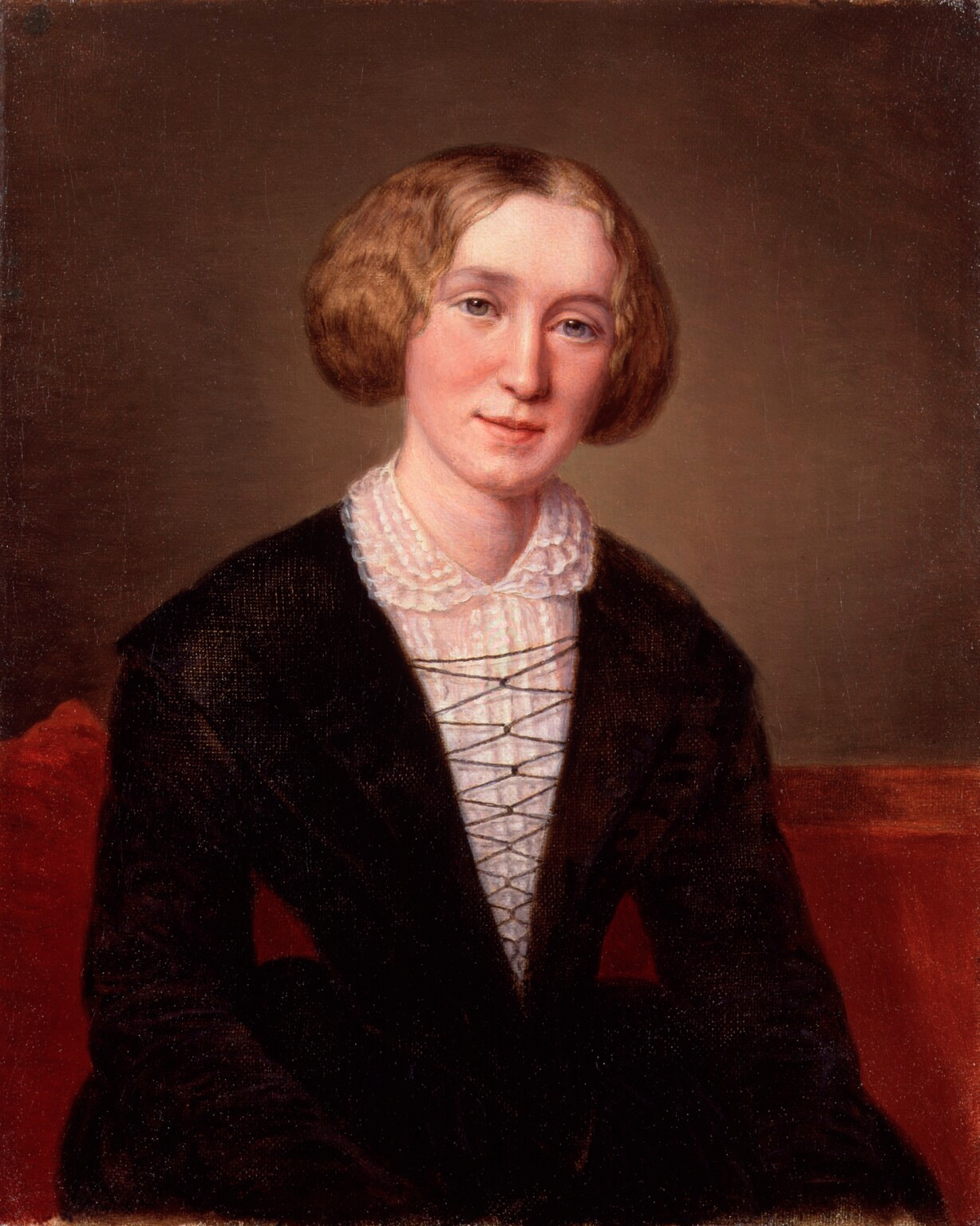
George Eliot

Middlemarch originates in two unfinished pieces that Eliot worked on during 1869 and 1870: the novel "Middlemarch" (Note: The title of this earlier work is put in quotes in order to distinguish it from the eventual novel of the same title.) (which focused on the character of Lydgate) and the long story "Miss Brooke" (which focused on the character of Dorothea). The former piece is first mentioned in her journal on 1 January 1869 as one of the tasks for the coming year. In August she began writing, but progress ceased in the following month amidst a lack of confidence in it and distraction by the illness of George Henry Lewes's son Thornie, who was dying of tuberculosis. (Eliot had been living with Lewes since 1854.) After Thornie's death on 19 October 1869, all work on the novel stopped; it is uncertain whether Eliot intended at the time to revive it at a later date.

In December she wrote of having begun another story, on a subject that she had considered "ever since I began to write fiction". By the end of the month she had written 100 pages of this story and entitled it "Miss Brooke". Although a precise date is unknown, the process of incorporating material from "Middlemarch" into the story she had been working on was ongoing by March 1871. While composing, Eliot compiled a notebook of hundreds of literary quotations, from poets, historians, playwrights, philosophers, and critics in eight different languages.

By May 1871, the growing length of the novel had become a concern to Eliot, as it threatened to exceed the three-volume format that was then the norm in publishing. The issue was compounded because Eliot's most recent novel, Felix Holt, the Radical (1866) – also set in the same pre-Reform Bill England – had not sold well. The publisher John Blackwood, who had made a loss on acquiring the English rights to that novel, was approached by Lewes in his role as Eliot's literary agent. He suggested that the novel be brought out in eight two-monthly parts, borrowing the method used for Victor Hugo's novel Les Misérables. This was an alternative to the monthly issues that had been used for such longer works as Dickens's David Copperfield and Thackeray's Vanity Fair, and avoided Eliot's objections to slicing her novel into small parts. Blackwood agreed, although he feared there would be "complaints of a want of the continuous interest in the story" due to the independence of each volume. The eight books duly appeared during 1872, the last three instalments being issued monthly.

With the deaths of Thackeray and Dickens in 1863 and 1870, respectively, Eliot became "recognised as the greatest living English novelist" at the time of the novel's final publication.

== Plot ==
Set in the years immediately before the 1832 Reform Act, Middlemarch follows the intertwined lives of several inhabitants of a Midlands town. The main strands concern Dorothea Brooke’s search for purpose, the medical ambitions of Dr Tertius Lydgate, the romantic fortunes of Fred Vincy and Mary Garth, and the eventual downfall of the banker Nicholas Bulstrode.

Dorothea Brooke, a wealthy young woman of strong religious idealism, lives with her sister Celia under the guardianship of their uncle Mr Brooke. Though admired by the baronet Sir James Chettam, Dorothea instead marries the much older clergyman and scholar Edward Casaubon, hoping to dedicate herself to his research. On their honeymoon in Rome, she discovers the sterility of the marriage and befriends Casaubon's disinherited cousin, Will Ladislaw. Casaubon grows jealous of Ladislaw’s friendship with Dorothea, and his insecurity deepens as his health declines.

Meanwhile, the Vincy family occupies an important place in Middlemarch society. Fred Vincy, the mayor's son, is charming but feckless, relying on the expectation of inheriting from his wealthy uncle, Peter Featherstone. He is in love with Mary Garth, the practical and principled niece who keeps house for Featherstone, but she refuses him while he remains irresponsible. Fred's debts lead him to involve Mary's father, Caleb Garth, in financial loss, straining his hopes of winning her. When Featherstone dies, the inheritance goes not to Fred but to an illegitimate son, leaving Fred humiliated and forced to reconsider his path.

Fred's illness during this period brings him under the care of Dr Tertius Lydgate, a talented young physician new to Middlemarch. Lydgate hopes to reform medical practice through science and sanitation, and finds support from the wealthy, evangelical banker Nicholas Bulstrode who funds a new hospital. Lydgate's dedication earns him respect, but his courtship of Rosamond Vincy, Fred's beautiful but vain sister, leads to marriage and financial strain. Rosamond's extravagance draws Lydgate into debt, undermining his professional independence.

Casaubon, increasingly ill, tries to bind Dorothea to his control, asking her to promise obedience to his wishes after his death. When he dies, his will reveals a codicil disinheriting her if she marries Ladislaw. The provision fuels gossip in Middlemarch and complicates their relationship. Dorothea continues to struggle between duty and affection, while Ladislaw remains in town as a journalist, supporting Mr Brooke's unsuccessful parliamentary campaign on a Reform platform.

Bulstrode's past eventually returns to haunt him. The arrival of John Raffles exposes how Bulstrode had profited dishonourably in his youth, concealing the existence of Ladislaw's mother, the rightful heir to his first wife's fortune. Fearful of exposure, Bulstrode hastens Raffles's death while attempting to cover his tracks. His disgrace spreads to Lydgate, who has recently accepted Bulstrode's financial help; many in Middlemarch assume the doctor complicit in corruption. Though Dorothea defends his honour, public opinion forces Lydgate and Rosamond to leave, his ambitions for medical reform destroyed.

As scandals and disappointments reshape the town, Fred redeems himself by training as a land agent under Caleb Garth. With the guidance of the kindly Rev. Farebrother, who suppresses his own love for Mary, Fred matures and eventually marries her. Dorothea, after recognising her feelings for Ladislaw, rejects the security of Casaubon's fortune and chooses to marry him, despite her family's disapproval.

The novel concludes with a brief "Finale" summarising later lives. Fred and Mary live contentedly with their children. Lydgate prospers in a conventional career but dies at 50, leaving Rosamond to remarry a wealthy physician. Dorothea and Ladislaw raise two children, their son inheriting Mr Brooke's estate, while Dorothea devotes herself to her husband and to reformist causes. Each character's fate reflects the mixture of compromise, limitation, and idealism that defines life in Middlemarch.

== Characters ==
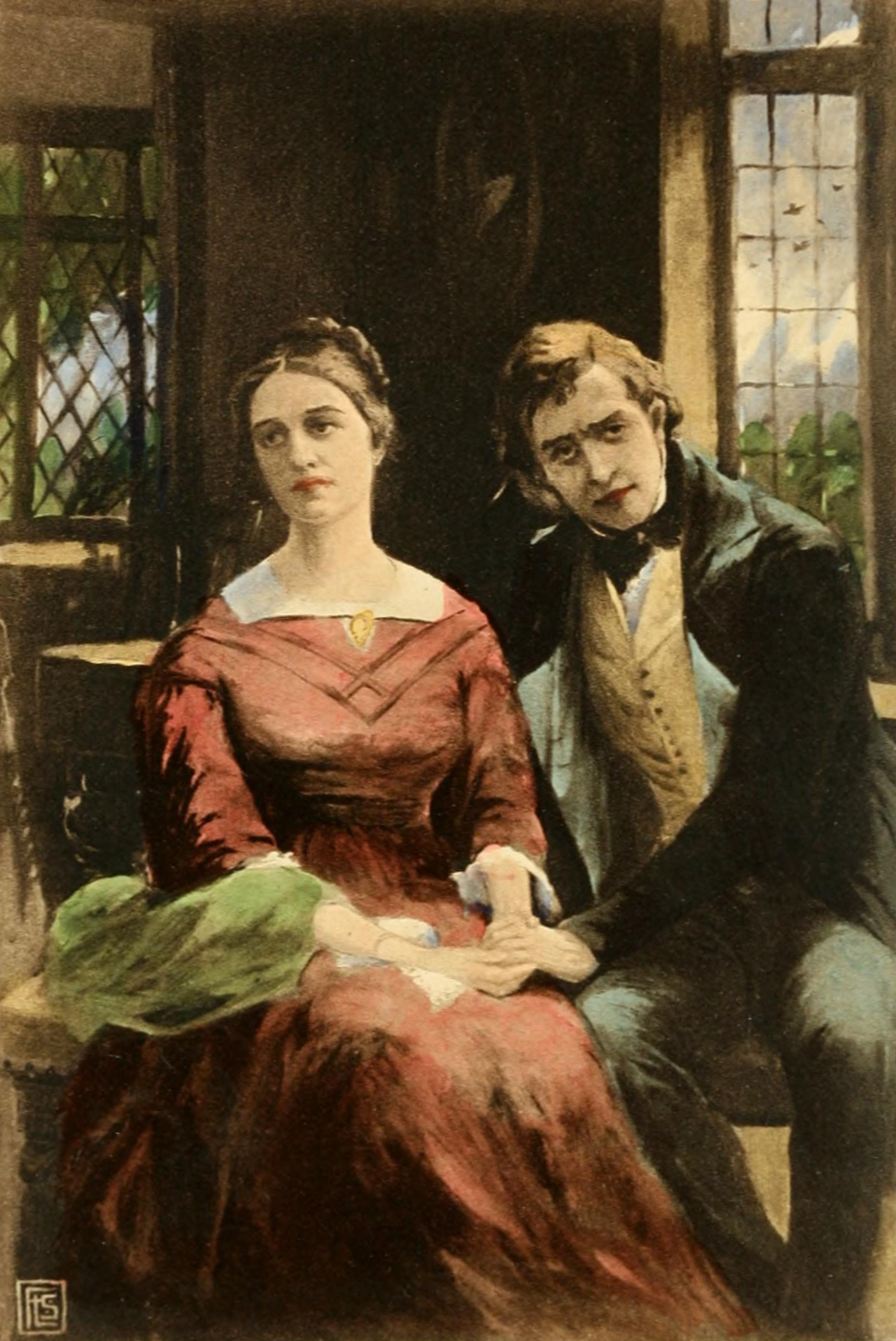
Dorothea Brooke and Will Ladislaw

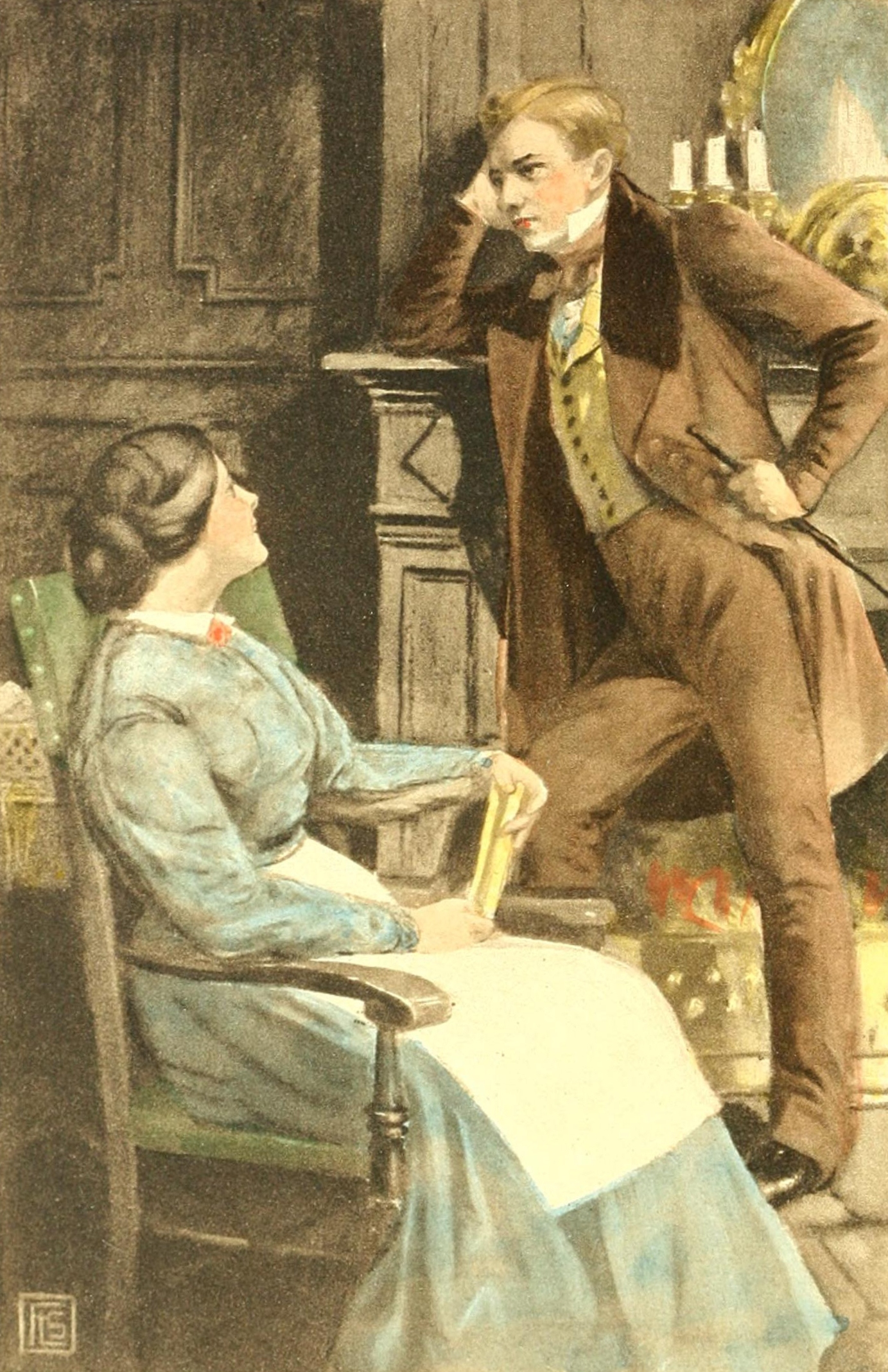
Mary Garth and Fred Vincy

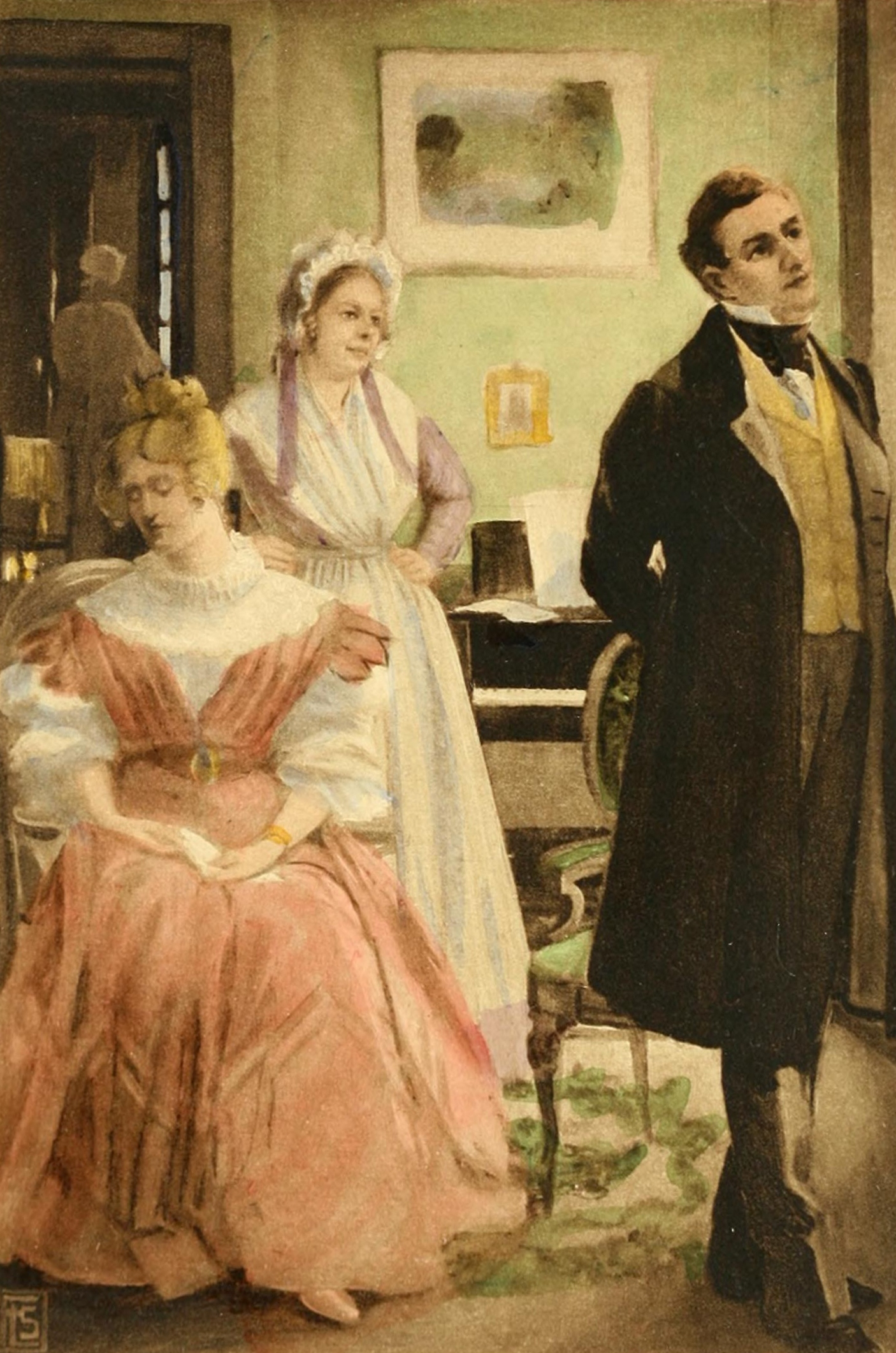
Rosamond Vincy and Tertius Lydgate

- Dorothea Brooke: An intelligent, wealthy young orphaned woman with great aspirations, Dorothea avoids displaying her wealth and embarks upon projects such as redesigning cottages for her uncle's tenants. She marries the much older Reverend Edward Casaubon, with the idealistic idea of helping him in his research, The Key to All Mythologies. However, the marriage was a mistake, as Casaubon fails to take her seriously and resents her youth, enthusiasm, and energy. Her requests to assist him make it harder for him to conceal that his research is years out of date. Faced with Casaubon's coldness on their honeymoon, Dorothea becomes friends with his relative, Will Ladislaw. Some years after Casaubon's death she falls in love with Will and marries him.
- Tertius Lydgate: An idealistic, talented, but naive young doctor, is relatively poor, but of good birth. He hopes to make big advances in medicine through his research, but ends up in an unhappy marriage with Rosamond Vincy. His attempts to show he is answerable to no man fail, and he eventually has to leave town, sacrificing his high ideals to please his wife.

- Rev. Edward Casaubon /kəˈsɔːbən/: A pedantic, selfish clergyman (in his late 40s, at least) who is so taken up with his scholarly research that his marriage to Dorothea is loveless. His unfinished book, The Key to All Mythologies, is intended as a monument to Christian syncretism, but his research is out of date as he cannot read German. He is aware of this but admits it to no one.
- Mary Garth: The plain, kind daughter of Caleb and Susan Garth serves as Mr Featherstone's very patient housekeeper and nurse. She and Fred Vincy were childhood sweethearts, but she will not let him woo her until he shows himself willing and able to live seriously, practically and sincerely.
- Arthur Brooke: The oft-befuddled, none-too-clever uncle and guardian of Dorothea and Celia Brooke has a reputation as the worst landlord in the county, but stands for Parliament on a Reform platform.
- Celia Brooke: Dorothea's younger sister is a beauty. She is more sensual than Dorothea and does not share her idealism and asceticism. She is only too happy to marry Sir James Chettam when Dorothea rejects him.
- Sir James Chettam: A neighbouring landowner, he is in love with Dorothea and helps with her plans to improve conditions for the tenants. When she marries Casaubon, he marries Celia Brooke.
- Rosamond Vincy: Vain, beautiful and shallow, Rosamond has a high opinion of her own charms and a low opinion of Middlemarch society. She marries Tertius Lydgate, believing he will raise her social standing and keep her comfortable. When her husband meets financial difficulties, she thwarts his efforts to economise, seeing such sacrifices as beneath her and insulting. She cannot bear the idea of losing social status.
- Fred Vincy: Rosamond's brother has loved Mary Garth from childhood. His family hopes he will advance socially by becoming a clergyman, but he knows Mary will not marry him if he does. Brought up to expect an inheritance from his uncle, Mr Featherstone, he is a spendthrift, but later changes through his love for Mary and finds by studying under Mary's father a profession that gains Mary's respect.
- Will Ladislaw: This young cousin of Mr Casaubon has no property because his grandmother, Casaubon's aunt, married a poor Polish musician and was disinherited. Will is supported for some years by Casaubon. He is a man of verve, idealism and talent, but no fixed profession. He worships Dorothea, but cannot marry her without her losing Mr Casaubon's property as his widow.
- Humphrey Cadwallader and Elinor Cadwallader: Neighbours of the Brookes, Mr Cadwallader is a rector and Mrs Cadwallader a pragmatic and talkative woman who comments on local affairs with wry cynicism. She disapproves of Dorothea's marriage and Mr Brooke's parliamentary endeavours.
- Walter Vincy and Lucy Vincy: A respectable manufacturing couple, they wish their children to advance socially and are disappointed by Rosamond's and Fred's marriages. Vincy's sister is married to Nicholas Bulstrode. Mrs Vincy was an innkeeper's daughter and her sister the second wife of Mr. Featherstone.
- Caleb Garth: Mary Garth's father is a kind, honest, generous surveyor and land agent involved in farm management. He is fond of Fred and eventually takes him under his wing.
- Camden Farebrother: A poor but clever vicar and amateur naturalist, he is a friend of Lydgate and Fred Vincy and loves Mary Garth. He supplements his income playing billiards and whist. His position improves when Dorothea appoints him to a living after Casaubon's death.
- Nicholas Bulstrode: A wealthy banker married to Vincy's sister, Harriet, he is a pious Methodist keen to impose his beliefs in Middlemarch society. However, he has a sordid past he is desperate to hide. His religion favours his personal desires and lacks sympathy for others.
- Peter Featherstone: An old landlord of Stone Court, he is a self-made man, who has married Caleb Garth's sister. On her death he takes Mrs Vincy's sister as his second wife.
- Jane Waule: A widow and Peter Featherstone's sister, she has a son, John.
- Mr Hawley: A foul-mouthed businessman, he is an enemy of Bulstrode.
- Mr Mawmsey: A grocer
- Dr Sprague: A Middlemarch physician
- Mr Tyke: A clergyman favoured by Bulstrode
- Joshua Rigg Featherstone: Featherstone's illegitimate son, he appears at the reading of Featherstone's will and receives a fortune instead of Fred. He is also the stepson of John Raffles, who comes into town to visit Rigg, but instead reveals Bulstrode's past. His appearance in the novel is crucial to the plot.
- John Raffles: Raffles is a braggart and a bully, a humorous scoundrel in the tradition of Sir John Falstaff, and an alcoholic. But unlike Falstaff, Raffles is a truly evil man. He holds the key to Bulstrode's dark past and Lydgate's future.

Middlemarch characters family tree

== Historical novel ==
The action of Middlemarch takes place "between September 1829 and May 1832", or 40 years before its publication in 1871–1872, a gap not so pronounced for it to be regularly labelled as a historical novel. By comparison, Walter Scott's Waverley (1814) – often seen as the first major historical novel – takes place some 60 years before it appears. Eliot had previously written a more obviously historical novel, Romola (1862–1863), set in 15th-century Florence. The critics Kathleen Blake and Michael York Mason argue that there has been insufficient attention given to Middlemarch "as a historical novel that evokes the past in relation to the present".

The critic Rosemary Ashton notes that the lack of attention to this side of the novel may indicate its merits: "Middlemarch is that very rare thing, a successful historical novel. In fact, it is so successful that we scarcely think of it in terms of that subgenre of fiction." For its contemporary readers, the present "was the passage of the Second Reform Act in 1867"; the agitation for the Reform Act 1832 and its turbulent passage through the two Houses of Parliament, which provide the structure of the novel, would have been seen as the past.

Though rarely categorised as a historical novel, Middlemarch's attention to historical detail has been noticed; in an 1873 review, Henry James recognised that Eliot's "purpose was to be a generous rural historian". Elsewhere, Eliot has been seen to adopt "the role of imaginative historian, even scientific investigator in Middlemarch and her narrator as conscious "of the historiographical questions involved in writing a social and political history of provincial life". This critic compares the novel to "a work of the ancient Greek historian Herodotus", who is often described as "The Father of History".

== Themes ==
=== A Study of Provincial Life ===
The fictional town of Middlemarch, North Loamshire, is probably based on Coventry, where Eliot had lived before moving to London. Like Coventry, Middlemarch is described as a silk-ribbon manufacturing town.

The subtitle—"A Study of Provincial Life"—has been seen as significant. One critic views the unity of Middlemarch as achieved through "the fusion of the two senses of 'provincial'": on the one hand it means geographically "all parts of the country except the capital"; and on the other, a person who is "unsophisticated" or "narrow-minded". Carolyn Steedman links Eliot's emphasis on provincialism in Middlemarch to Matthew Arnold's discussion of social class in England in Culture and Anarchy essays, published in 1869, about the time Eliot began working on the stories that became Middlemarch. There Arnold classes British society in terms of Barbarians (aristocrats and landed gentry), Philistines (urban middle class) and Populace (working class). Steedman suggests Middlemarch "is a portrait of Philistine Provincialism".

It is worth noting that Eliot went to London, as her heroine Dorothea does at the end of the book. There Eliot achieved fame way beyond most women of her time, whereas Dorothea takes on the role of nurturing Will and her family. Eliot was rejected by her family once she had settled in her common-law relationship with Lewes, and "their profound disapproval prevented her ever going home again". She omitted Coventry from her last visit to the Midlands in 1855.

=== The "Woman Question" ===
Central to Middlemarch is the idea that Dorothea Brooke cannot hope to achieve the heroic stature of a figure like St Teresa, for Eliot's heroine lives at the wrong time, "amidst the conditions of an imperfect social state, in which great feelings will often take the aspect of error, and great faith the aspect of illusion". Antigone, a figure from Greek mythology best known from Sophocles' play, is given in the "Finale" as a further example of a heroic woman. The literary critic Kathleen Blake notes Eliot's emphasis on St Teresa's "very concrete accomplishment, the reform of a religious order", rather than her Christian mysticism. A frequent criticism by feminist critics is that not only is Dorothea less heroic than St Teresa and Antigone, but George Eliot herself. In response, Ruth Yeazell and Kathleen Blake chide these critics for "expecting literary pictures of a strong woman succeeding in a period [around 1830] that did not make them likely in life". Eliot has also been criticised more widely for ending the novel with Dorothea marrying Will Ladislaw, someone so clearly her inferior. The novelist Henry James describes Ladislaw as a dilettante who "has not the concentrated fervour essential in the man chosen by so nobly strenuous a heroine".

=== Marriage ===
Marriage is one of the major themes in Middlemarch. According to George Steiner, "both principal plots [those of Dorothea and Lydgate] are case studies of unsuccessful marriage". This suggests that these "disastrous marriages" leave the lives of Dorothea and Lydgate unfulfilled. This is arguably more the case with Lydgate than with Dorothea, who gains a second chance through her later marriage to Will Ladislaw, but a favourable interpretation of this marriage depends on the character of Ladislaw himself, whom numerous critics have viewed as Dorothea's inferior. In addition, there is the "meaningless and blissful" marriage of Dorothea's sister Celia Brooke to Sir James Chettam, and more significantly Fred Vincy's courting of Mary Garth. In the latter, Mary Garth will not accept Fred until he abandons the Church and settles on a more suitable career. Here Fred resembles Henry Fielding's character Tom Jones, both being moulded into a good husband by the love they give to and receive from a woman.

Dorothea is a St Teresa, born in the wrong century, in provincial Middlemarch, who mistakes in her idealistic ardor, "a poor dry mummified pedant... as a sort of angel of vocation". Middlemarch is in part a Bildungsroman focusing on the psychological or moral growth of the protagonist: Dorothea "blindly gropes forward, making mistakes in her sometimes foolish, often egotistical, but also admirably idealistic attempt to find a role" or vocation that fulfils her nature. Lydgate is equally mistaken in his choice of a partner, as his idea of a perfect wife is someone "who can sing and play the piano and provide a soft cushion for her husband to rest after work". So he marries Rosamond Vincy, "the woman in the novel who most contrasts with Dorothea", and thereby "deteriorates from ardent researcher to fashionable doctor in London".

== Critical reception ==
=== Contemporary reviews ===
The Examiner, The Spectator and Athenaeum reviewed each of the eight books that comprise Middlemarch as they were published from December 1871 to December 1872; such reviews speculated on the eventual direction of the plot and responded accordingly. Contemporary response to the novel was mixed. Writing as it was being published, the Spectator reviewer R. H. Hutton criticised it for what he saw as its melancholic quality. Athenaeum, reviewing it after "serialisation", found the work overwrought and thought it would have benefited from hastier composition. (Note: The novel was completed before being published in eight instalments (volumes).) Blackwood's Edinburgh Magazine reviewer W. L. Collins saw as the work's most forceful impression its ability to make readers sympathise with the characters. Edith Simcox of Academy offered high praises, hailing it as a landmark in fiction owing to the originality of its form; she rated it first amongst Eliot's œuvre, which meant it "has scarcely a superior and very few equals in the whole wide range of English fiction".

"What do I think of 'Middlemarch'?" What do I think of glory – except that in a few instances this "mortal has already put on immortality." George Eliot was one. The mysteries of human nature surpass the "mysteries of redemption," for the infinite we only suppose, while we see the finite.

— Emily Dickinson, Letter to her cousins Louise and Fannie Norcross

Henry James presented a mixed opinion. Middlemarch, according to him, was "at once one of the strongest and one of the weakest of English novels ... Middlemarch is a treasure-house of details, but it is an indifferent whole". Among the details, his greatest criticism ("the only eminent failure in the book") was of the character of Ladislaw, who he felt was an insubstantial hero-figure as against Lydgate. The scenes between Lydgate and Rosamond he especially praised for their psychological depth – he doubted whether there were any scenes "more powerfully real... [or] intelligent" in all English fiction. Thérèse Bentzon, for the Revue des deux Mondes, was critical of Middlemarch. Although finding merit in certain scenes and qualities, she faulted its structure as "made up of a succession of unconnected chapters, following each other at random... The final effect is one of an incoherence which nothing can justify." In her view, Eliot's prioritisation of "observation rather than imagination... inexorable analysis rather than sensibility, passion or fantasy" means that she should not be held amongst the first ranks of novelists. The German philosopher Friedrich Nietzsche, who read Middlemarch in a translation owned by his mother and sister, derided the novel for construing suffering as a means of expiating the debt of sin, which he found characteristic of "little moralistic females à la Eliot".

Despite the divided contemporary response, Middlemarch gained immediate admirers: in 1873, the poet Emily Dickinson expressed high praise for the novel, exclaiming in a letter to a friend: "What do I think of Middlemarch? What do I think of glory."

The immediate success of Middlemarch may have been proportioned rather to the author's reputation than to its intrinsic merits. [The novel] ... seems to fall short of the great masterpieces which imply a closer contact with the world of realities and less preoccupation with certain speculative doctrines.

— Leslie Stephen, George Eliot (1902)

In separate centuries, Florence Nightingale and Kate Millett remarked on the eventual subordination of Dorothea's own dreams to those of her admirer, Ladislaw. Indeed, the ending acknowledges this and mentions how unfavourable social conditions prevented her from fulfilling her potential.

=== Later responses ===
In the first half of the 20th century, Middlemarch continued to provoke contrasting responses; while Leslie Stephen dismissed the novel in 1902, his daughter Virginia Woolf described it in 1919 as "the magnificent book that, which with all its imperfections, is one of the few English novels written for grown-up people." However, Woolf was "virtually unique" among the modernists in her unstinting praise for Middlemarch, and the novel also remained overlooked by the reading public of the time.

F. R. Leavis's The Great Tradition (1948) is credited with having "rediscovered" the novel:

The necessary part of great intellectual powers in such a success as Middlemarch is obvious ... the sheer informedness about society, its mechanisms, the ways in which people of different classes live ... a novelist whose genius manifests itself in a profound analysis of the individual.

Leavis' appraisal of it has been hailed as the beginning of a critical consensus that still exists towards the novel, in which it is recognised not only as Eliot's finest work, but as one of the greatest novels in English. V. S. Pritchett, in The Living Novel, two years earlier, in 1946 had written that "No Victorian novel approaches Middlemarch in its width of reference, its intellectual power, or the imperturbable spaciousness of its narrative ... I doubt if any Victorian novelist has as much to teach the modern novelists as George Eliot ... No writer has ever represented the ambiguities of moral choice so fully".

In the 21st century, the novel is still held in high regard. The novelists Martin Amis and Julian Barnes have both called it probably the greatest novel in the English language, (Note: Long, Camilla (24 January 2010). "Martin Amis and the sex war". The Times. "They've produced the greatest writer in the English language ever, George Eliot, and arguably the third greatest, Jane Austen, and certainly the greatest novel, Middlemarch ..." (subscription required)) and today Middlemarch is frequently included in university courses. In 2013, the then British Education Secretary Michael Gove referred to Middlemarch in a speech, suggesting its superiority to Stephenie Meyer's vampire novel Twilight. Gove's comments led to debate on teaching Middlemarch in Britain, including the question of when novels like Middlemarch should be read, and the role of canonical texts in teaching. The novel has remained a favourite with readers and scores high in reader rankings: in 2003 it was No. 27 in the BBC's The Big Read, and in 2007 it was No. 10 in "The 10 Greatest Books of All Time", based on a ballot of 125 selected writers. In 2015, in a BBC Culture poll of book critics outside the UK, the novel was ranked at number one in "The 100 greatest British novels".

On 5 November 2019, the BBC News reported that Middlemarch is on the BBC list of 100 "most inspiring" novels.

In 2026, a Guardian poll of more than 170 novelists, critics, and academics ranked Middlemarch as the best English-language novel of all time.

== Legacy and adaptations ==
Middlemarch has been adapted several times for television and the stage. The novel has never been made into a film, although the idea was toyed with by the English director Sam Mendes.

=== Television ===
In 1968 it appeared as a BBC-produced TV mini-series of the same name, directed by Joan Craft, starring Michele Dotrice. The first episode, "Dorothea", is missing from the BBC Archives, while the third episode, "The New Doctor", can be viewed online, although only as a low-quality black and white telerecording owned by a private collector. The other five episodes have been withheld from public viewing. In 1994 it was again adapted by the BBC as a television series of the same name, directed by Anthony Page with a screenplay by Andrew Davies. This was a critical and financial success and revived public interest in adapting the classics.

=== Stage ===
In 2013 came a stage adaptation, and also an Orange Tree Theatre Repertory production adapted and directed by Geoffrey Beevers as three plays: Dorothea's Story, The Doctor's Story, and Fred & Mary. In April 2022, Dash Arts produced The Great Middlemarch Mystery, an immersive theatre experience staged across three locations in Coventry, including Drapers Hall.

The opera Middlemarch in Spring by Allen Shearer, to a libretto by Claudia Stevens, has a cast of six and treats only the central story of Dorothea Brooke. It was first staged in San Francisco in 2015. In 2017, a modern adaptation, Middlemarch: The Series, aired on YouTube as a video blog.

In February 2026, it was announced that the Royal Shakespeare Company would present a two-part stage adaptation, written by Nina Raine and directed by Jeremy Herrin, to run from October 2026 to January 2027 in the RSC's Swan Theatre.

== Bibliography ==
- Ashton, Rosemary (1983). George Eliot. Oxford: Oxford University Press. ISBN 0-19-287627-9.
- Ashton, Rosemary (1994a). "Introduction". In Eliot, George (ed.). Middlemarch. Penguin. ISBN 978-0-141-43954-9.
- Ashton, Rosemary (1994b). George Eliot: A Life. London: Hamish Hamilton. ISBN 978-0-241-13377-0.
- Beaty, Jerome (1960). Middlemarch from Notebook to Novel: A Study of George Eliot's Creative Method. Urbana: University of Illinois Press.
- Blake, Kathleen (1976). "Middlemarch and the Woman Question". Nineteenth-Century Fiction. 31 (3): 285–312. doi:10.2307/2933580. JSTOR 2933580. (subscription required)
- Chase, Karen (1991). Eliot: Middlemarch (Landmarks of World Literature). Cambridge: Cambridge University Press. ISBN 0521359155.
- Eliot, George. Middlemarch, A Study of Provincial Life. Vol. 1 (first (1871-2) ed.), Eliot, George Volume 2, Volume 3, Volume 4
- Eliot, George. Middlemarch free PDF of Blackwood's 1878 Cabinet Edition (the critical standard with Eliot's final corrections) at the George Eliot Archive
- James, Henry (March 1873). "Review of Middlemarch". The Galaxy – via complete-review.com.
- Leavis, F. R. (1950). The Great Tradition: George Eliot, Henry James, Joseph Conrad. New York: George W. Stewart.
- Steedman, Carolyn (Summer 2001). "Going to Middlemarch: History and the Novel". Michigan Quarterly Review. XL (3): n.p.
- Steiner, F. George (1955a). "A Preface to Middlemarch". Nineteenth-Century Fiction. 9 (4): 262–279. doi:10.2307/3044392. JSTOR 3044392.
- Steiner, George (1955b). Tolstoy or Dostoevsky: An Essay in the Old Criticism. London: Faber and Faber.
- Swinden, Patrick, ed. (1972). George Eliot: Middlemarch: A Casebook. London: Macmillan. ISBN 0-333-02119-3.
- Woolf, Virginia (1925). The Common Reader. New York: Harcourt, Brace and Company.
- Wynne–Davies, Marion, ed. (1990). The Bloomsbury Guide to English Literature. New York: Prentice Hall.
