= George Eliot =

English novelist and poet (1819–1880)

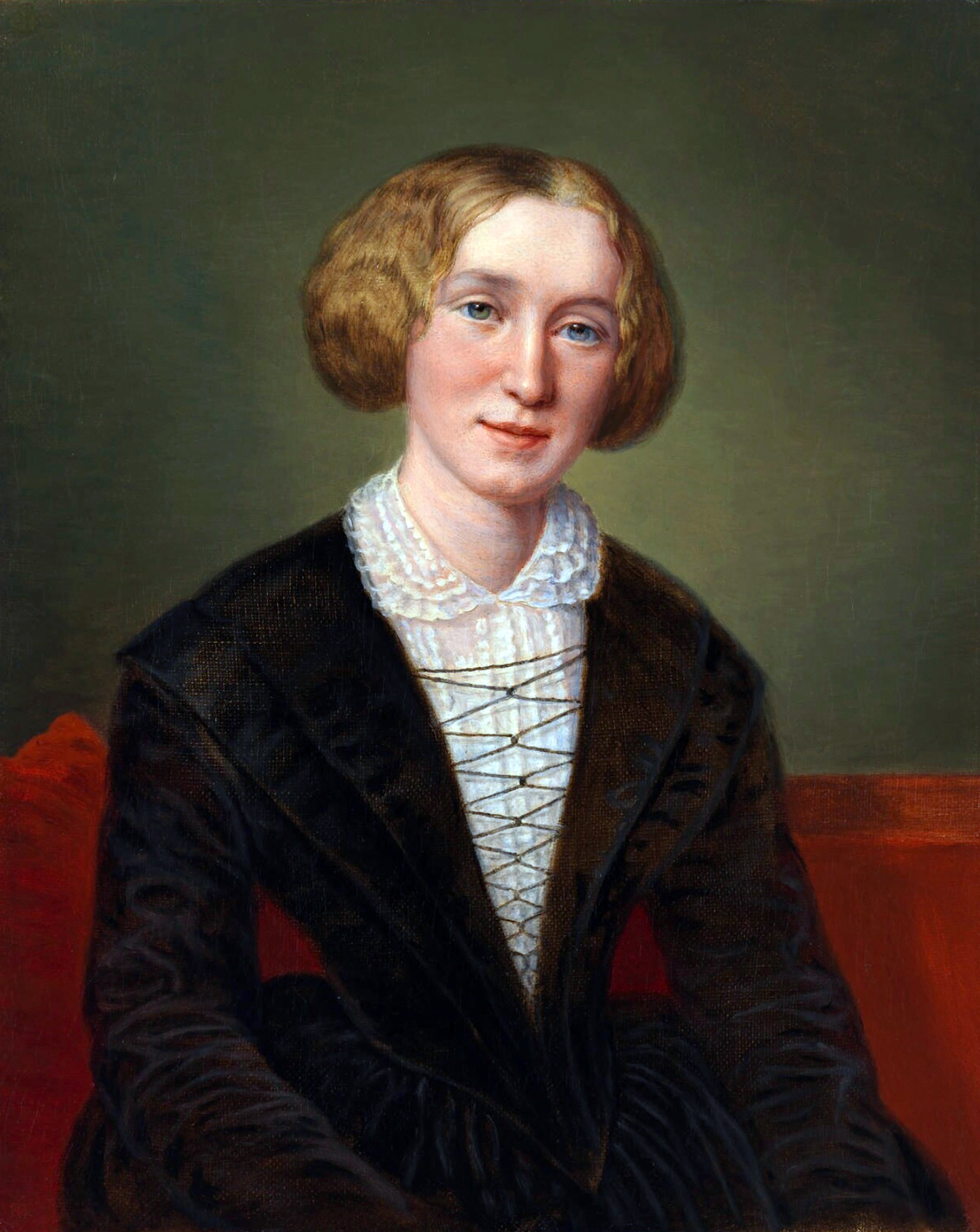
- Eliot (Mary Ann Evans) in 1850
- Born: Mary Ann Evans; 22 November 1819; Nuneaton, Warwickshire, England
- Died: 22 December 1880 (aged 61); Chelsea, London, England
- Resting place: Highgate Cemetery (East), Highgate, London
- Occupations: Novelist, poet, journalist, translator
- Spouse: John Cross (m. 1880)
- Partner: George Henry Lewes (1854–1878) (his death)
- Writing career
- Pen name: George Eliot
- Period: Victorian
- Notable work: Middlemarch (1871–1872)

Mary Ann Evans (22 November 1819 – 22 December 1880; alternatively Mary Anne or Marian), known by her pen name George Eliot, was an English novelist, poet, journalist, translator, and one of the leading writers of the Victorian era. She wrote seven novels: Adam Bede (1859), The Mill on the Floss (1860), Silas Marner (1861), Romola (1862–1863), Felix Holt, the Radical (1866), Middlemarch (1871–1872) and Daniel Deronda (1876). Her novels are known for their realism, psychological insight, sense of place, and detailed depiction of the countryside. Middlemarch was described by the novelist Virginia Woolf as "one of the few English novels written for grown-up people" and by Martin Amis and Julian Barnes as the greatest novel in the English language.

Scandalously and unconventionally for the era, she lived with the married George Henry Lewes as his conjugal partner, from 1854 to 1878, and called him her husband. He remained married to his wife, Agnes Jervis, and supported their children, even after Jervis left him to live with another man and have children with him. In May 1880, 18 months after Lewes's death, Eliot married her longtime friend John Cross, a man much younger than her, and changed her name to Mary Ann Cross.

== Life ==
=== Early life and education ===
Mary Ann Evans was born in Nuneaton, Warwickshire, at South Farm on the Arbury Hall estate. She was the third child of Robert Evans (1773–1849), manager of the Arbury Hall estate, and Christiana Evans (née Pearson, 1788–1836), daughter of a local mill-owner. Her full siblings were: Christiana, known as Chrissey (1814–1859), Isaac (1816–1890), and twin brothers who died a few days after birth in March 1821. She also had a half-brother, Robert Evans (1802–1864), and half-sister, Frances "Fanny" Evans Houghton (1805–1882), from her father's previous marriage to Harriet Poynton (1780–1809). In early 1820, the family moved to a house named Griff House, between Nuneaton and Bedworth.

The young Evans was a voracious reader. Because she was not considered physically attractive, Evans was not thought to have much chance of marriage, and this, coupled with her intelligence, led her father to invest in an education not often afforded to women. From ages five to nine, she boarded with her sister Chrissey at Miss Latham's school in Attleborough, from ages nine to thirteen at Mrs. Wallington's school in Nuneaton, and from ages thirteen to sixteen at Miss Franklin's school in Coventry. At Mrs. Wallington's school, she was taught by the evangelical Maria Lewis—to whom her earliest surviving letters are addressed. In the religious atmosphere of the Misses Franklin's school, Evans was exposed to a quiet, disciplined belief opposed to evangelicalism.

After age sixteen, Evans had little formal education. Thanks to her father's important role on the estate, she was allowed access to the library of Arbury Hall, which greatly aided her self-education and breadth of learning. Her classical education left its mark; Christopher Stray has observed that "George Eliot's novels draw heavily on Greek literature (only one of her books can be printed correctly without the use of a Greek typeface), and her themes are often influenced by Greek tragedy". Her frequent visits to the estate also allowed her to contrast the wealth in which the local landowner lived with the lives of the often much poorer people on the estate, and different lives lived in parallel would reappear in many of her works.

=== Move to Coventry ===
In 1836, her mother died and Evans (then sixteen) returned home to act as housekeeper, though she continued to correspond with her tutor Maria Lewis. When she was twenty-one, her brother Isaac married and took over the family home, so Evans and her father moved to Foleshill near Coventry. The closeness to Coventry society brought new influences, most notably those of Charles and Cara Bray. Charles Bray had become rich in his career as a ribbon manufacturer and had used his wealth in the building of schools and in other philanthropic causes. Evans, who had been struggling with religious doubts for some time, became intimate friends with the radical, free-thinking Brays, who had a casual view of marital obligations and the Brays' "Rosehill" home was a haven for people who held and debated radical views. The people whom the young woman met at the Brays' house included Robert Owen, Herbert Spencer, Harriet Martineau, and Ralph Waldo Emerson. Through this society Evans was introduced to more liberal and agnostic theologies and to writers such as David Strauss and Ludwig Feuerbach, who cast doubt on the literal truth of Biblical texts. Her first major literary work was an English translation of Strauss's Das Leben Jesu kritisch bearbeitet as The Life of Jesus, Critically Examined (1846), which she completed after it had been left incomplete by Elizabeth "Rufa" Brabant, another member of the "Rosehill Circle".

The Strauss book had caused a sensation in Germany by arguing that the miracles in the New Testament were mythical additions with little basis in fact. Evans's translation had a similar effect in England, with the Earl of Shaftesbury calling her translation "the most pestilential book ever vomited out of the jaws of hell." Later she translated Feuerbach's The Essence of Christianity (1854).

As a product of their friendship, Bray published some of Evans's own earliest writing, such as reviews, in his newspaper the Coventry Herald and Observer. As Evans began to question her own religious faith, her father threatened to throw her out of the house, but his threat was not carried out. Instead, she respectfully attended church and continued to keep house for him until his death in 1849, when she was 30. Five days after her father's funeral, she travelled to Switzerland with the Brays. She decided to stay on in Geneva alone, living first on the lake at Plongeon (near the present-day United Nations buildings) and then on the second floor of a house owned by her friends François and Juliet d'Albert Durade on the rue de Chanoines (now the rue de la Pelisserie). She commented happily that "one feels in a downy nest high up in a good old tree". Her stay is commemorated by a plaque on the building. While residing there, she read avidly and took long walks in the beautiful Swiss countryside, which was a great inspiration to her. François Durade painted her portrait there as well.

=== Move to London and editorship of the Westminster Review ===
On her return to England the following year (1850), she moved to London with the intent of becoming a writer, and she began referring to herself as Marian Evans. She stayed at the house of John Chapman, the radical publisher whom she had met earlier at Rosehill and who had published her Strauss translation. She then joined Chapman's ménage-à-trois along with his wife and mistress. Chapman had recently purchased the campaigning, left-wing journal The Westminster Review. Evans became its assistant editor in 1851 after joining just a year earlier.

Evans's writings for the paper were comments on her views of society and the Victorian way of thinking. She was sympathetic to the lower classes and criticised organised religion throughout her articles and reviews and commented on contemporary ideas of the time. Much of this was drawn from her own experiences and knowledge, which she used this to critique other ideas and organisations. This led to her writing being viewed as authentic and wise, but not too obviously opinionated.

Evans also focused on the business side of the Review with attempts to change its layout and design. Although Chapman was officially the editor, it was Evans who did most of the work of producing the journal. She contributed many essays and reviews beginning with the January 1852 issue, and continuing until the end of her employment at the Review in the first half of 1854.

Eliot sympathized with the 1848 Revolutions throughout continental Europe, and even hoped that the Italians would chase the "odious Austrians" out of Lombardy and that "decayed monarchs" would be pensioned off. In contrast, she believed a gradual reformist approach to social problems was best for England.

In 1850–51, Evans attended classes in mathematics at the Ladies College in Bedford Square, later known as Bedford College, London.

=== Relationship with George Henry Lewes ===
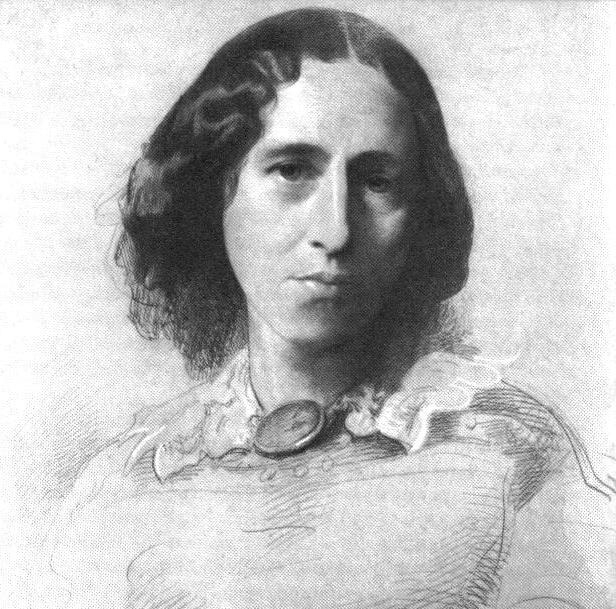
Portrait of George Eliot by Samuel Laurence, c. 1860

The philosopher and critic George Henry Lewes (1817–1878) met Evans in 1851, and by 1854 they had decided to live together. Lewes was already married to Agnes Jervis, although in an open marriage. In addition to the three children they had together, Agnes also had four children by Thornton Leigh Hunt. In July 1854, Lewes and Evans travelled to Weimar and Berlin together for the purpose of research. Before going to Germany, Evans continued her theological work with a translation of Feuerbach's The Essence of Christianity, and while abroad she wrote essays and worked on her translation of Baruch Spinoza's Ethics, which she completed in 1856, but which was not published in her lifetime because the prospective publisher refused to pay the requested £75. In 1981, Eliot's translation of Spinoza's Ethics was finally published by Thomas Deegan, and was determined to be in the public domain in 2018 and published by the George Eliot Archive. It has been re-published in 2020 by Princeton University Press.

The trip to Germany also served as a honeymoon for Evans and Lewes, who subsequently considered themselves married. Evans began to refer to Lewes as her husband and to sign her name as Mary Ann Evans Lewes, legally changing her name to Mary Ann Evans Lewes after his death. The refusal to conceal the relationship was contrary to the social conventions of the time, and attracted considerable disapproval.

=== Career in fiction ===
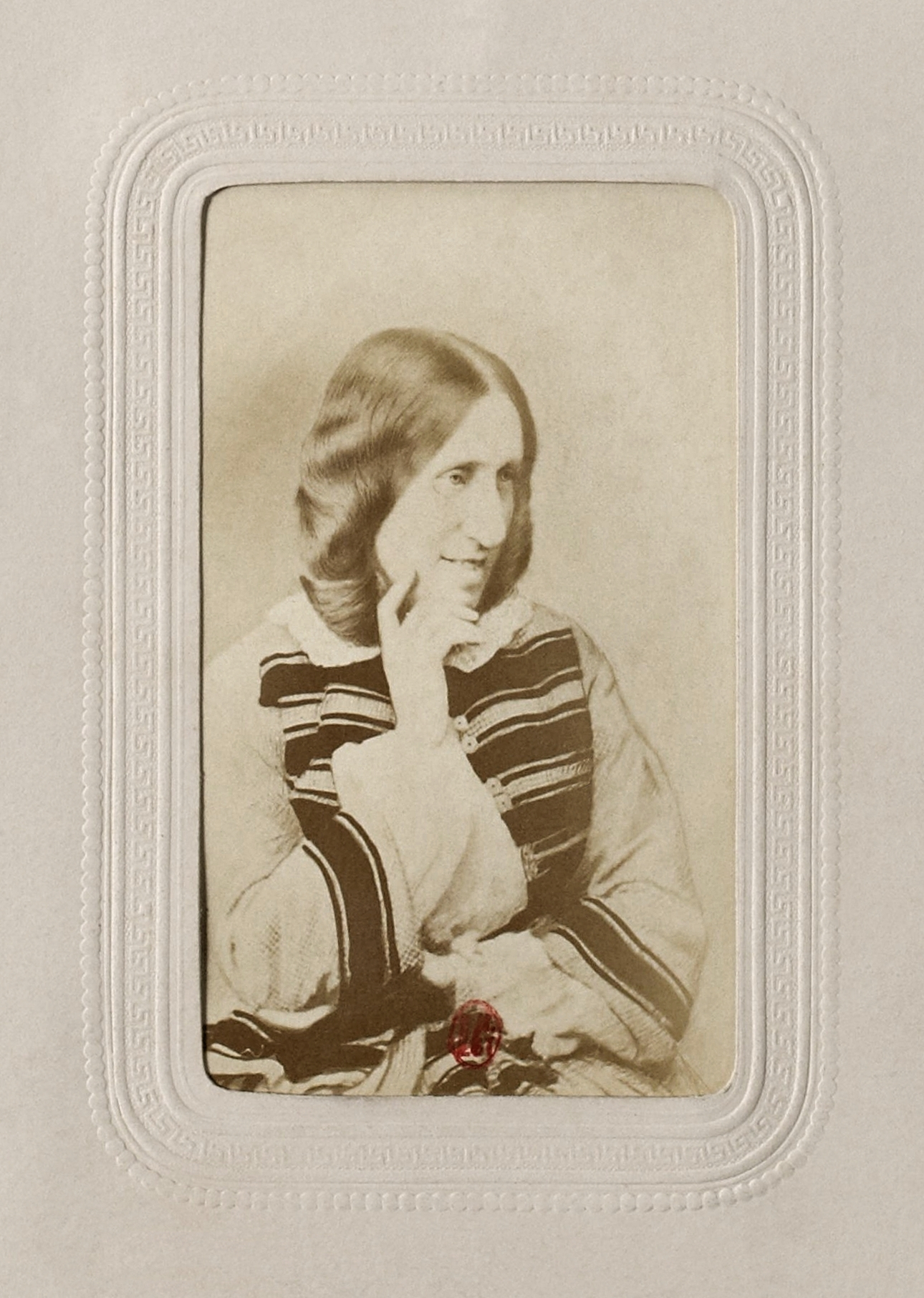
Photograph (albumen print) of George Eliot, c. 1865

While continuing to contribute pieces to the Westminster Review, Evans resolved to become a novelist, and set out a pertinent manifesto in one of her last essays for the Review, "Silly Novels by Lady Novelists" (1856). The essay criticised the trivial and ridiculous plots of contemporary fiction written by women. In other essays, she praised the realism of novels that were being written in Europe at the time, an emphasis on realistic storytelling confirmed in her own subsequent fiction. She also adopted a nom-de-plume, George Eliot; as she explained to her biographer J. W. Cross, George was Lewes's forename, and Eliot was "a good mouth-filling, easily pronounced word". Although female authors were published under their own names during her lifetime, she wanted to escape the stereotype of women's writing being limited to lighthearted romances or other lighter fare not to be taken very seriously. She also wanted to have her fiction judged separately from her already extensive and widely known work as a translator, editor, and critic. Another factor in her use of a pen name may have been a desire to shield her private life from public scrutiny, thus avoiding the scandal that would have arisen because of her relationship with Lewes.

In 1857, when she was thirty-seven years of age, "The Sad Fortunes of the Reverend Amos Barton", the first of the three stories included in Scenes of Clerical Life, and the first work of "George Eliot", was published in Blackwood's Magazine. The Scenes (published as a 2-volume book in 1858) was well received, and was widely believed to have been written by a country parson, or perhaps the wife of a parson.

Eliot was profoundly influenced by the works of Thomas Carlyle. As early as 1841, she referred to him as "a grand favourite of mine", and references to him abound in her letters from the 1840s and 1850s. According to University of Victoria professor Lisa Surridge, Carlyle "stimulated Eliot's interest in German thought, encouraged her turn from Christian orthodoxy, and shaped her ideas on work, duty, sympathy, and the evolution of the self." These themes made their way into Evans's first complete novel, Adam Bede (1859). It was an instant success, and prompted yet more intense curiosity as to the author's identity: there was even a pretender to the authorship, one Joseph Liggins. This public interest subsequently led to Mary Anne Evans Lewes's acknowledgment that it was she who stood behind the pseudonym George Eliot. Adam Bede is known for embracing a realist aesthetic inspired by Dutch visual art.

The revelations about Eliot's private life surprised and shocked many of her admiring readers, but this did not affect her popularity as a novelist. Her relationship with Lewes afforded her the encouragement and stability she needed to write fiction, but it would be some time before the couple were accepted into polite society. Acceptance was finally confirmed in 1877 when they were introduced to Princess Louise, the daughter of Queen Victoria. The queen herself was an avid reader of all of Eliot's novels and was so impressed with Adam Bede that she commissioned the artist Edward Henry Corbould to paint scenes from the book.

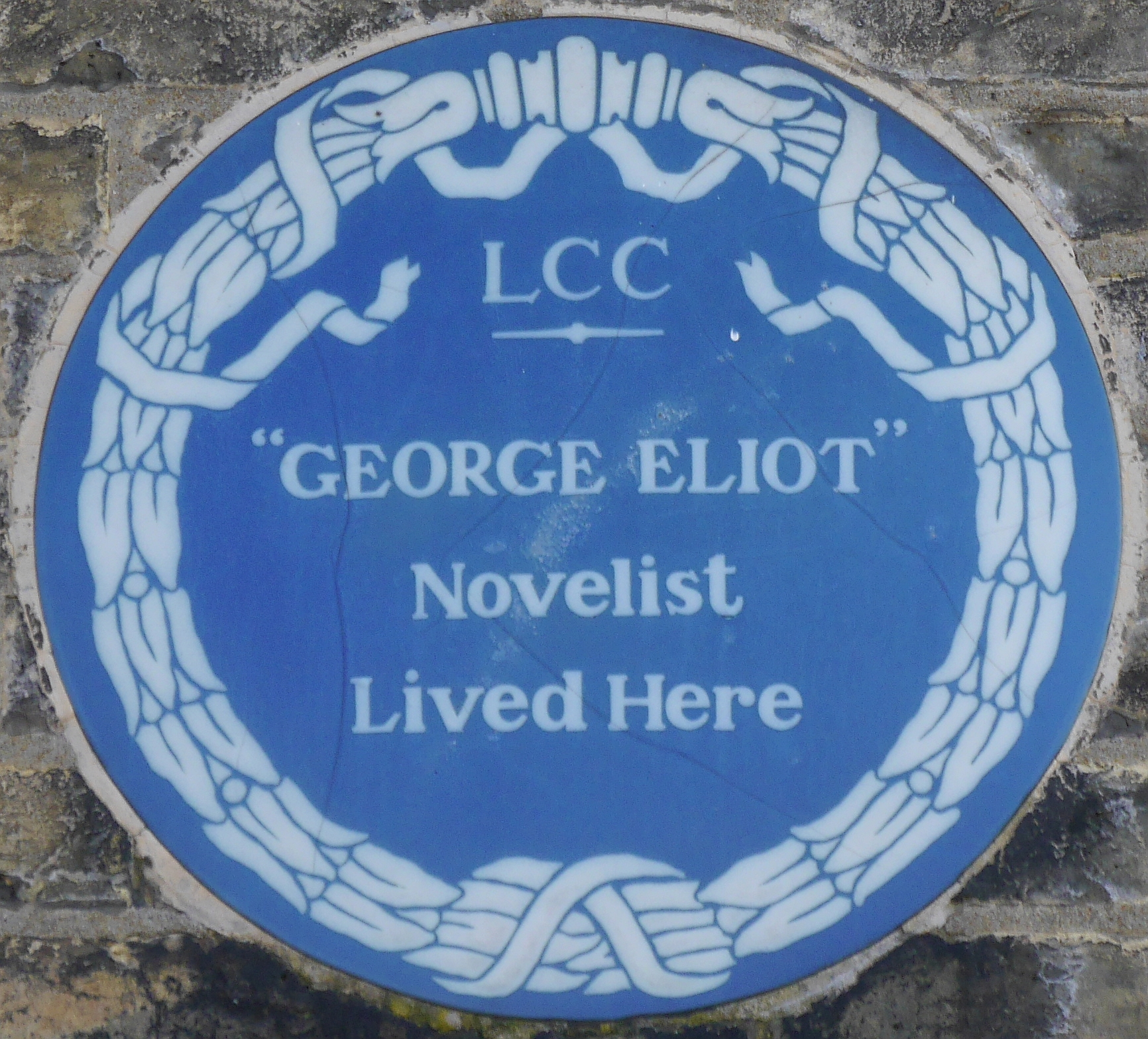
Blue plaque, Holly Lodge, 31 Wimbledon Park Road, London

When the American Civil War broke out in 1861, Eliot expressed sympathy for the Union cause, something which historians have attributed to her abolitionist sympathies. In 1868, she supported philosopher Richard Congreve's protests against governmental policies in Ireland and had a positive view of the growing movement in support of Irish home rule.

She was influenced by the writings of John Stuart Mill and read all of his major works as they were published. In Mill's The Subjection of Women (1869) she judged the second chapter excoriating the laws which oppress married women "excellent." She was supportive of Mill's parliamentary run, but believed that the electorate was unlikely to vote for a philosopher and was surprised when he won. While Mill served in parliament, she expressed her agreement with his efforts on behalf of female suffrage, being "inclined to hope for much good from the serious presentation of women's claims before Parliament." In a letter to John Morley, she declared her support for plans "which held out reasonable promise of tending to establish as far as possible an equivalence of advantage for the two sexes, as to education and the possibilities of free development", and dismissed appeals to nature in explaining women's lower status. In 1870, she responded enthusiastically to Lady Amberley's feminist lecture on the claims of women for education, occupations, equality in marriage, and child custody. It would be wrong to assume that the female protagonists of her works can be considered "feminist", with the sole exception perhaps of Romola de' Bardi, who resolutely rejects the State and Church obligations of her time.

After the success of Adam Bede, Eliot continued to write popular novels for the next fifteen years. Within a year of completing Adam Bede, she finished The Mill on the Floss, dedicating the manuscript: "To my beloved husband, George Henry Lewes, I give this MS. of my third book, written in the sixth year of our life together, at Holly Lodge, South Field, Wandsworth, and finished 21 March 1860." Silas Marner (1861) and Romola (1863) soon followed, and later Felix Holt, the Radical (1866) and her most acclaimed novel, Middlemarch (1871–1872). Her last novel was Daniel Deronda, published in 1876, after which she and Lewes moved to Witley, Surrey. By this time Lewes's health was failing, and he died two years later, on 30 November 1878. Eliot spent the next six months editing Lewes's final work, Life and Mind, for publication, and found solace and companionship with longtime friend and financial adviser John Walter Cross, a Scottish commission agent twenty years her junior, whose mother had recently died.

=== Marriage to John Cross and death ===
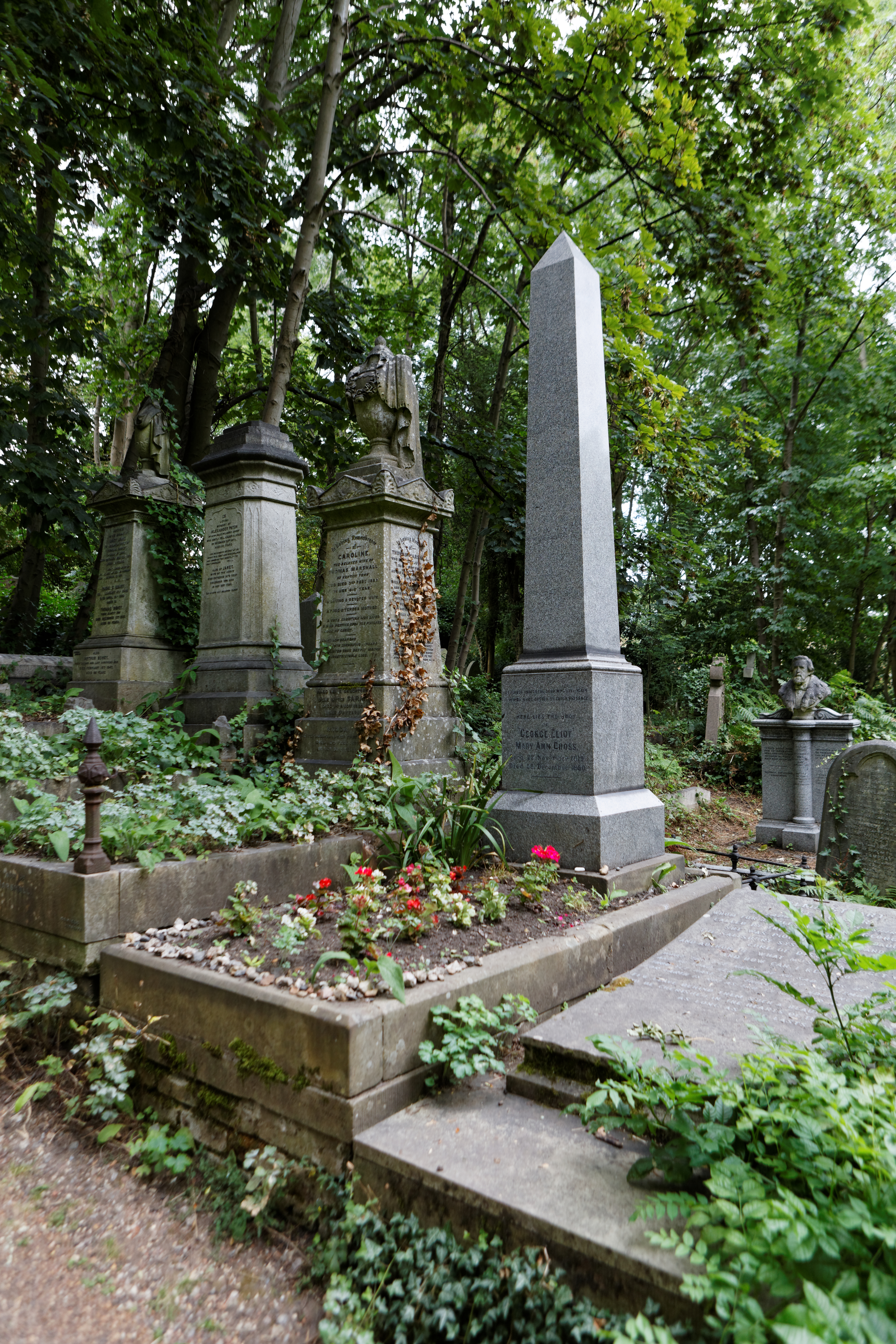
Eliot's grave in Highgate Cemetery

On 16 May 1880, eighteen months after Lewes' death, Eliot married John Walter Cross (1840–1924) and again changed her name, this time to Mary Ann Cross. While the marriage courted some controversy due to the age difference, it pleased her brother Isaac, who had broken off relations with Eliot when she had begun to live with Lewes, but now sent congratulations. Cross was subject to fits of depression, and while the couple were honeymooning in Venice, jumped from the hotel balcony into the Grand Canal in an apparent suicide attempt. He survived, and the newlyweds returned to England. They moved to a new house in Chelsea, but Eliot fell ill with a throat infection. This, coupled with the kidney disease with which she had been afflicted for several years, led to her death on 22 December 1880 at the age of sixty-one.

Due to her denial of the Christian faith and her relationship with Lewes, Eliot was not buried in Westminster Abbey. She was instead interred in Highgate Cemetery (East), Highgate, London, in the area reserved for political and religious dissenters and agnostics, beside the love of her life, George Henry Lewes. (Note: While the biographical consensus is that Lewes and Eliot had a perfect partnership, this view has been somewhat modified by Beverley Park Rilett, who argued in 2013 and 2017 that Lewes's protective love may have amounted to coercive control.) The graves of Karl Marx and her friend Herbert Spencer are nearby. In 1980, on the centenary of her death, a memorial stone was established for her in the Poets' Corner between W. H. Auden and Dylan Thomas, with a quote from Scenes of Clerical Life: "The first condition of human goodness is something to love; the second something to reverence".

=== Personal appearance ===
George Eliot was considered by contemporaries to be physically unattractive. She knew this and made jokes about her appearance in letters to friends. Despite this, numerous acquaintances found that the force of her personality overcame their impression of her appearance. Of his first meeting with her on 9 May 1869, Henry James wrote:

To begin with she is magnificently ugly — deliciously hideous. She has a low forehead, a dull grey eye, a vast pendulous nose, a huge mouth, full of uneven teeth & a chin & jawbone qui n'en finissent pas ["which never end"].... Now in this vast ugliness resides a most powerful beauty which, in a very few minutes steals forth & charms the mind, so that you end as I ended, in falling in love with her.

=== Spelling of her name ===
She spelled her name differently at different times. Mary Anne was the spelling used by her father for the baptismal record and she uses this spelling in her earliest letters. Within her family, however, it was spelled Mary Ann. By 1852, she had changed to Marian, but she reverted to Mary Ann in 1880 after she married John Cross. Her memorial stone reads:

Here lies the body of
'George Eliot'
Mary Ann Cross

== Memorials and tributes ==
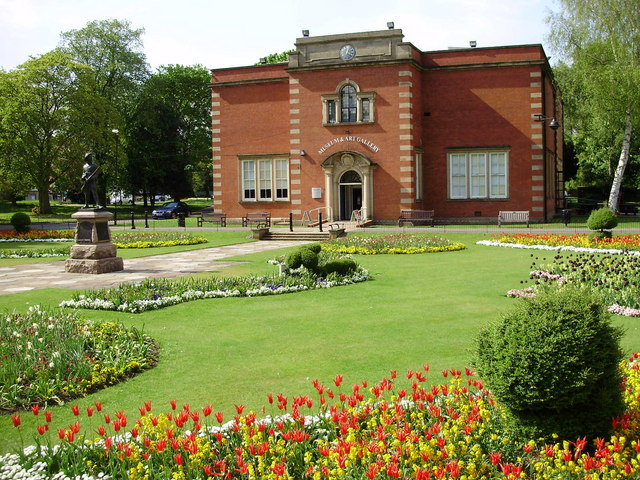
Nuneaton Museum and Art Gallery, in Riversley Park, home of collection on writer George Eliot

Several landmarks in her birthplace of Nuneaton are named in her honour. These include the George Eliot Academy, Middlemarch Junior School, George Eliot Hospital (formerly Nuneaton Emergency Hospital), and George Eliot Road, in Foleshill, Coventry. Also, The Mary Anne Evans Hospice in Nuneaton. A statue of Eliot is in Newdegate Street, Nuneaton, and Nuneaton Museum & Art Gallery has a display of artefacts related to her.

In 2015, a new residence hall was named after Evans at Royal Holloway University of London, successor to Bedford College, which Evans attended in 1850-1.

== Literary assessment ==
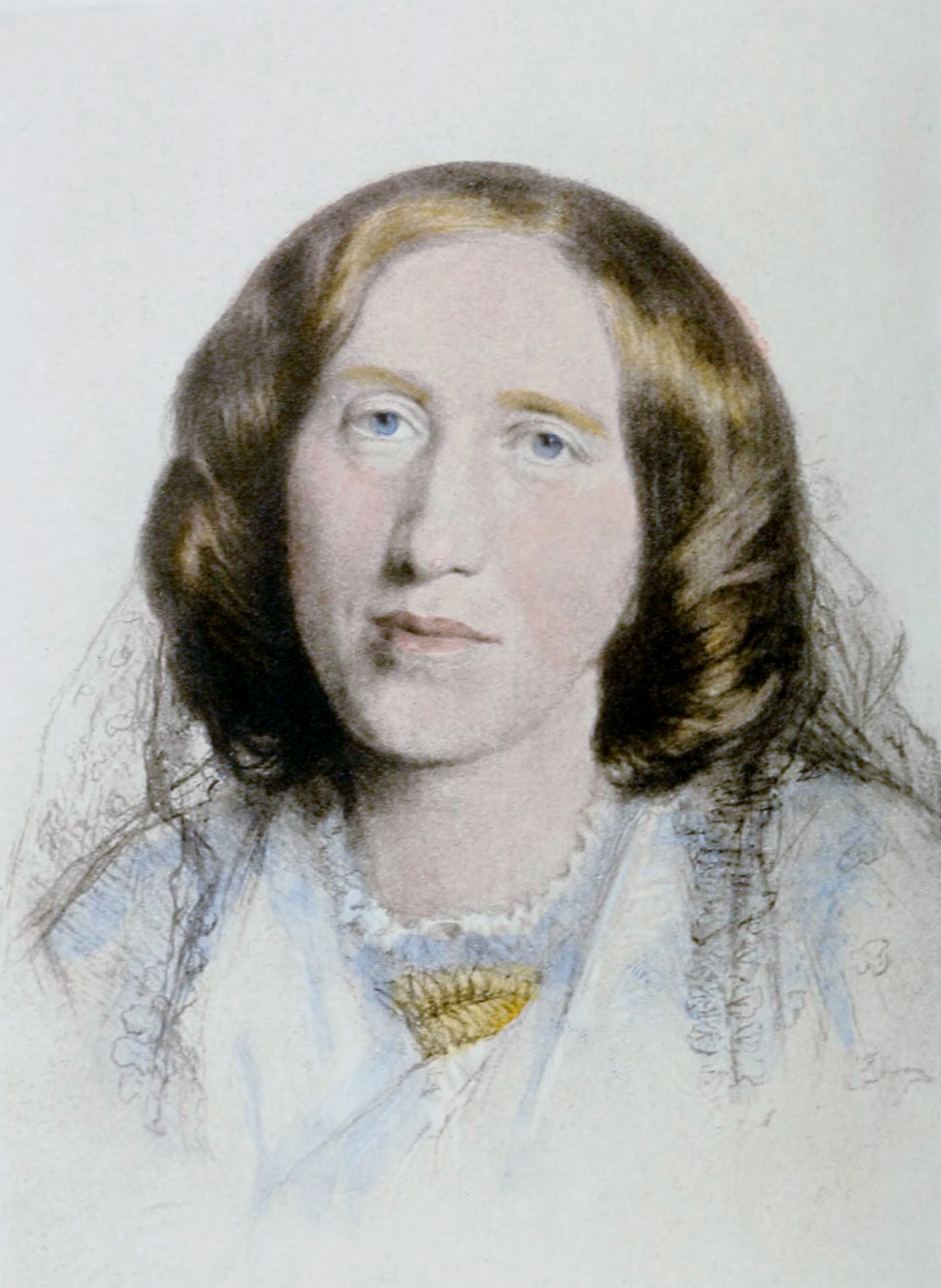
Portrait by Frederick William Burton, 1864

Throughout her career, Eliot wrote with a politically astute pen. From Adam Bede to The Mill on the Floss and Silas Marner, Eliot presented the cases of social outsiders and small-town persecution. Felix Holt, the Radical and The Legend of Jubal were overtly political, and political crisis is at the heart of Middlemarch, in which she presents the stories of a number of inhabitants of a small English town on the eve of the Reform Bill of 1832; the novel is notable for its deep psychological insight and sophisticated character portraits. The roots of her realist philosophy can be found in her review of John Ruskin's Modern Painters in Westminster Review in 1856. Eliot also expresses proto-Zionist ideas in Daniel Deronda.

Readers in the Victorian era praised her novels for their depictions of rural society. Much of the material for her prose was drawn from her own experience. She shared with Wordsworth the belief that there was much value and beauty to be found in the mundane details of ordinary country life. Eliot did not, however, confine herself to stories of the English countryside. Romola, an historical novel set in late fifteenth century Florence, was based on the life of the Italian priest Girolamo Savonarola. In The Spanish Gypsy, Eliot made a foray into verse, but her poetry's initial popularity has not endured.

Working as a translator, Eliot was exposed to German texts of religious, social, and moral philosophy such as David Friedrich Strauss's Life of Jesus and Feuerbach's The Essence of Christianity; also important was her translation from Latin of Baruch Spinoza's Ethics. Elements from these works show up in her fiction, much of which is written with her trademark sense of agnostic humanism.

According to Clare Carlisle, who published a new biography on George Eliot in 2023, the overdue publication of Spinoza's Ethics was a real shame, because it could have provided some illuminating cues for understanding the more mature works of the writer.

Eliot had taken particular notice of Feuerbach's conception of Christianity, positing that the understanding of the nature of the divine was to be found ultimately in the nature of humanity projected onto a divine figure. An example of this philosophy appeared in her novel Romola, in which Eliot's protagonist displayed a "surprisingly modern readiness to interpret religious language in humanist or secular ethical terms."

Though Eliot herself was not religious, she had respect for religious tradition and its ability to maintain a sense of social order and morality. The religious elements in her fiction also owe much to her upbringing, with the experiences of Maggie Tulliver from The Mill on the Floss sharing many similarities with the young Mary Ann Evans. Eliot also faced a quandary similar to that of Silas Marner, whose alienation from the church simultaneously meant his alienation from society.

Because Eliot retained a respect for religion, German philosopher Friedrich Nietzsche excoriated her system of morality for figuring sin as a debt that can be expiated through suffering, which he demeaned as characteristic of "little moralistic females à la Eliot."

She was at her most autobiographical in Looking Backwards, part of her final published work Impressions of Theophrastus Such. By the time of Daniel Deronda, Eliot's sales were falling off, and she had faded from public view to some degree. This was not helped by the posthumous biography written by her husband, which portrayed a wonderful, almost saintly woman totally at odds with the scandalous life people knew she had led. In the early 20th century, Eliot was championed by a new breed of critics, most notably by Virginia Woolf, who called Middlemarch "one of the few English novels written for grown-up people".

In 1994, literary critic Harold Bloom placed Eliot among the most important Western writers of all time. In a 2007 authors' poll by Time, Middlemarch was voted the tenth greatest literary work ever written. In 2015, writers from outside the UK voted it first among all British novels "by a landslide". The various film and television adaptations of Eliot's books have reintroduced her to the wider reading public.

== Works ==
=== Novels ===
- Adam Bede (1859)
- The Mill on the Floss (1860)
- Silas Marner (1861)
- Romola (1863)
- Felix Holt, the Radical (1866)
- Middlemarch (1871–1872)
  - "Quarry for Middlemarch", MS Lowell 13, Houghton Library, Harvard University (a digital facsimile of the manuscript of research notes)
- Daniel Deronda (1876)

=== Short story collection and novellas ===
- Scenes of Clerical Life (1858)
  - The Sad Fortunes of the Rev. Amos Barton
  - Mr Gilfil's Love Story
  - Janet's Repentance
- The Lifted Veil (1859)
- Brother Jacob (1864)
- Impressions of Theophrastus Such (1879)

=== Translations ===
- Das Leben Jesu, kritisch bearbeitet (The Life of Jesus, Critically Examined) Volume 2 by David Strauss (1846)
- Das Wesen des Christentums (The Essence of Christianity) by Ludwig Feuerbach (1854)
- The Ethics of Benedict de Spinoza by Benedict de Spinoza (1856)

=== Poetry ===
- Knowing That I Must Shortly Put Off This Tabernacle (1840)
- In a London Drawingroom (1865)
- A Minor Prophet (1865)
- Two Lovers (1866)
- O May I Join the Choir Invisible (1867)
- The Spanish Gypsy (1868)
- Agatha (1869)
- Brother and Sister (1869)
- How Lisa Loved the King (1869)
- The Legend of Jubal (1869)
- Armgart (1870)
- Stradivarius (1873)
- Arion (1873)
- I Grant You Ample Leave (1874)
- Sweet Evenings Come and Go, Love (1878)
- Self and Life (1879)
- A College Breakfast Party (1878)
- The Death of Moses (1878)

=== Non-fiction ===
- George Eliot's Nonfiction For digital copies of all George Eliot's nonfiction (approximately 70 essays), and all her published writings, see the GeorgeEliotArchive.org.
- "Three Months in Weimar" (1855)
- "Silly Novels by Lady Novelists" (1856)
- "The Natural History of German Life" (1856)
- Review of John Ruskin's Modern Painters in Westminster Review, April 1856
- "The Influence of Rationalism" (1865)
