= Silas Marner =

1861 novel by George Eliot

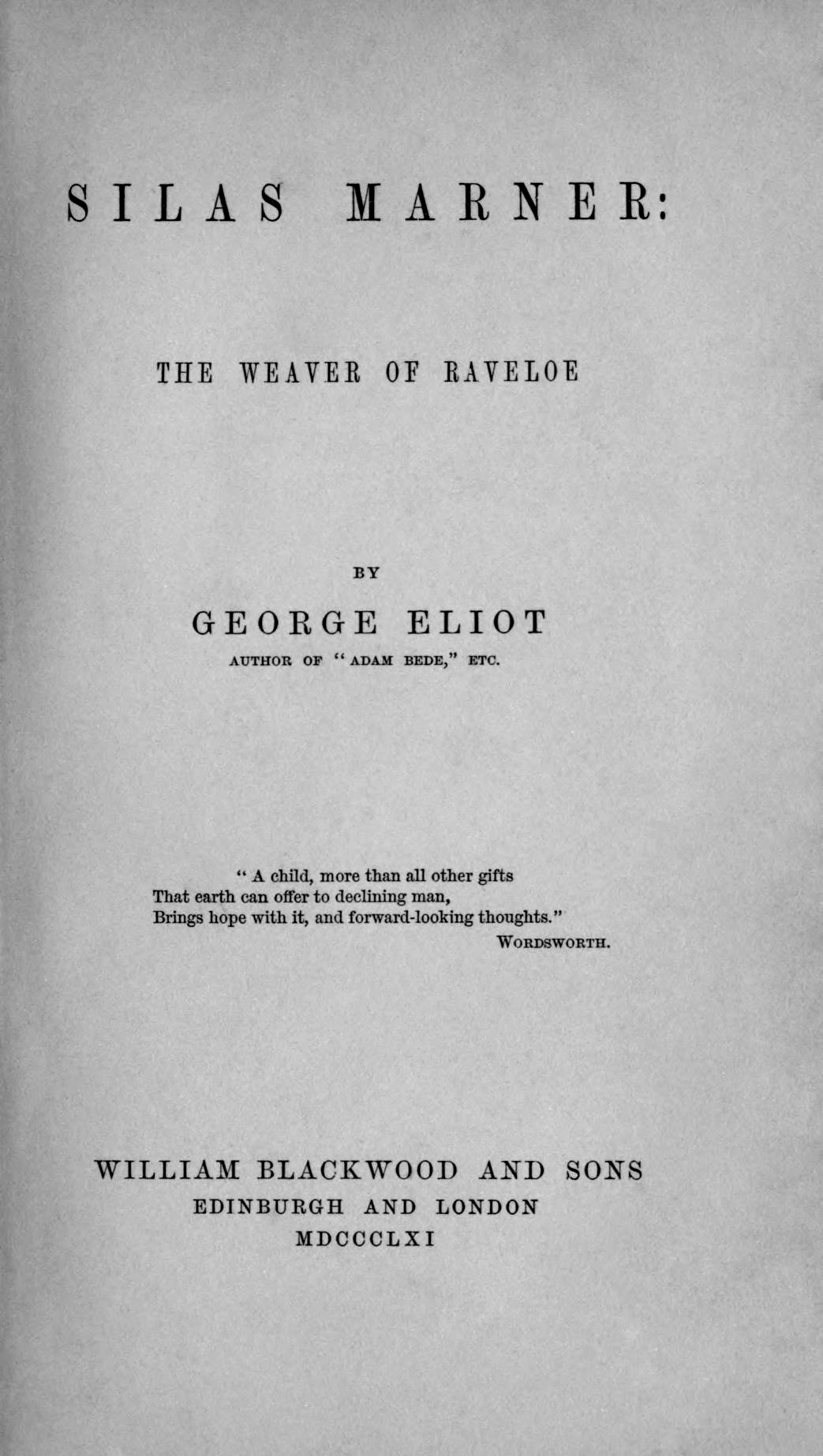
- Title page of the first edition, 1861
- Author: George Eliot
- Language: English
- Publisher: William Blackwood and Sons
- Publication date: 2 April 1861
- Publication place: United Kingdom
- Preceded by: The Mill on the Floss
- Followed by: Romola

Silas Marner: The Weaver of Raveloe is the third novel by English author George Eliot, published on 2 April 1861. A seemingly simple story of a linen weaver, Silas Marner has a strong realist bent and a sophisticated treatment of issues ranging from religion to industrialisation to community.

== Plot summary ==
The novel is set in the early years of the 19th century. Silas Marner, a weaver, is a member of a small Calvinist congregation in Lantern Yard, a slum street in Northern England. He is falsely accused of stealing the congregation's funds while watching over the very ill deacon. Two pieces of evidence implicate Silas: a pocket knife, and the discovery in his own house of the bag formerly containing the money. There is the strong suggestion that Silas's best friend, William Dane, has framed him, since Silas had lent his pocket knife to William shortly before the crime was committed. Lots are drawn in the belief – also shared by Silas – that God will direct the process and establish the truth, but they indicate that Silas is guilty. The woman Silas was to marry breaks their engagement and marries William instead. With his life shattered, his trust in God lost, and his heart broken, Silas leaves Lantern Yard and the city for a rural area where he is unknown.

Silas travels south to the Midlands and settles near the rural village of Raveloe in Warwickshire where he lives isolated and alone, choosing to have only minimal contact with the residents beyond his work as a linen weaver. He devotes himself wholeheartedly to his craft and comes to adore the coins, many of them gold, he earns from his weaving and hoards.

One foggy night, Silas's two bags of coins are stolen by Dunstan ("Dunsey") Cass, the dissolute second son of Squire Cass, the town's leading landowner. On discovering the theft, Silas sinks into a deep depression despite the villagers' attempts to aid him. Dunsey disappears, but the community makes no connection to the theft, since he has vanished several times before, and he accidentally killed the horse he was supposed to sell for his elder brother, Godfrey.

The squire's eldest son, Godfrey Cass, harbours a secret past. He is married to, but estranged from, Molly Farren, an opium-addicted working-class woman living in another town. This secret prevents Godfrey from marrying Nancy Lammeter, a virtuous, beautiful young middle-class woman. On a winter's night, Molly tries to make her way to Squire Cass's New Year's Eve party with her two-year-old girl to announce that she is Godfrey's wife. On the way, she takes opium, collapses in the snow and dies from the cold. The child wanders into Silas's house. Silas follows the child's tracks in the snow and discovers the dead woman. When he goes to the party for help, Godfrey goes to the scene of the accident, but resolves to tell no one that Molly was his wife. Molly's death enables Godfrey to marry Nancy; he promises to abandon his dissolute life and reform.

Silas keeps the child and names her Hephzibah (nicknamed Eppie) after his deceased mother and sister. Eppie changes Silas's life completely. He has been robbed of his material gold, but thinks that he has it returned to him symbolically in the form of the golden-haired child. Godfrey Cass continues to conceal the fact of his previous marriage, but keeps an eye on his child. He aids Marner in caring for Eppie with occasional financial gifts. Dolly Winthrop, Silas's kindly neighbour, provides more practical help and support in bringing up the child, such as passing along clothing that her own child has outgrown. Eppie draws Silas into village society.

Sixteen years pass. Eppie considers Silas to be her father. Silas has found a place in the rural society and a purpose in life. Meanwhile, Godfrey and Nancy are childless, after the death of their only baby. Eventually, the skeleton of Dunstan Cass and Silas's money are found at the bottom of the stone quarry near Silas's home after the water level goes down. It is surmised that, after stealing Silas's gold, Dunstan had become disorientated in the fog and fallen into the quarry. The money is duly returned to Silas. Shocked by this revelation, and stirred by his conscience, Godfrey confesses to Nancy that Molly was his first wife and that Eppie is his child. The Casses offer to raise her as a gentleman's daughter, much to Silas's distress. Eppie politely but firmly refuses, saying, "I can't think o' no happiness without him."

With his money restored, Silas takes Eppie to revisit Lantern Yard, but his old neighbourhood has been "swept away" in the intervening years, and the place has been replaced by a large factory. No one knows what happened to Lantern Yard's inhabitants. However, Silas contentedly resigns himself to not knowing and now leads a happy existence among his self-made family and friends in Raveloe. In the end, Eppie marries a local boy she has grown up with, Dolly's son Aaron, and they move into Silas's house, which has been newly improved courtesy of Godfrey.

== Characters ==
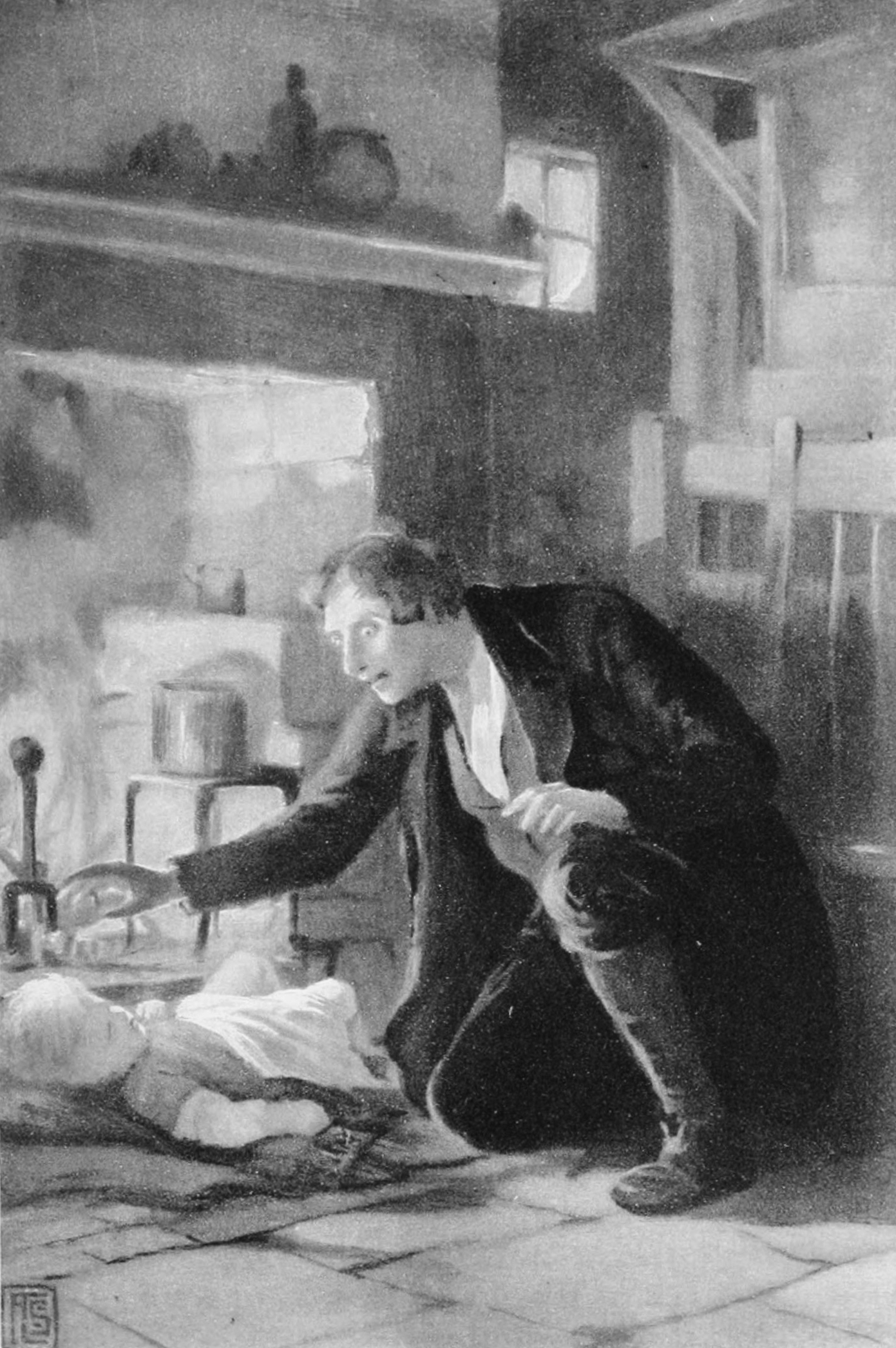
"Silas finds Eppie"

- Silas Marner: lower class by birth, a weaver who is betrayed at Lantern Yard (site of a dissenting sect) by his treacherous friend William Dane, moves away to Raveloe (where the community is Church of England), becomes taken for a miser, as he accumulates a small fortune, only to have it stolen by Dunstan Cass. After these misfortunes, he gradually finds his happiness and virtue by the arrival of young Eppie (biological daughter of Godfrey Cass) whom he raises as his adopted child. Eppie turns out to be a beautiful girl and it is decided later that she will marry Aaron Winthrop.
- Squire Cass: Lord of the Manor of Raveloe and host of the party on the night when Eppie comes into Silas's life.
- Godfrey Cass: upper class by birth but troubled over money, eldest son of the local squire, who is blackmailed by his dissolute brother Dunstan over his secret first marriage to Molly. When Molly dies, he feels relief, and escapes punishment for his betrayal and deceit, instead marrying Nancy.
- Dunstan Cass: second son of the local squire. He blackmails his elder brother, until he disappears. He steals Silas's gold after accidentally killing his brother's horse Wildfire. Many years pass before his corpse is found in a newly drained pit.
- Molly Farren: Godfrey's first (and secret) wife, who has a child by him; an opium addict; lower class, impoverished. She dies in the attempt to reveal to the community her relationship with Godfrey, leaving the child, Eppie, to wander into Silas's life.
- Eppie (Hephzibah): daughter of Molly and Godfrey, who is named by and cared for by Silas after the death of her mother. Mischievous in her early years, she grows into a radiant and beautiful young girl, devoted to her adoptive father.
- Nancy Cass (née Lammeter): Godfrey Cass's second wife, a morally and socially respectable young woman, admired by her husband but deceived by him as regards his past.
- Priscilla Lammeter: Nancy's plain, unmarried older sister, who supports Nancy and their father.
- Aaron Winthrop: son of Dolly, who marries Eppie at the end of the novel and is considered a happy match for her.
- Dolly Winthrop: mother of Aaron, wife of Ben; godmother to Eppie. Sympathetic to Silas and offers him practical support in raising the child.
- Ben Winthrop: wheelwright, largely invisible in the novel.
- Mr Snell: landlord of the Rainbow Inn, Raveloe.
- William Dane: Silas's former best friend at Lantern Yard. At the start of the novel, William betrays Silas by framing him for theft and marrying Silas's fiancée Sarah.
- Sarah: Silas's fiancée in Lantern Yard, who subsequently marries his treacherous friend William Dane.
- Mr Macey: the clerk at the local church, a tailor, very elderly by the end of the novel.
- Solomon Macey: Mr Macey's brother, a talented violinist.
- Mr Crackenthorpe: rector of Raveloe and a justice of the peace.
- Bob Lundy: the butcher of Raveloe.
- John Dowlas: the farrier of Raveloe.
- Jem Rodney: a local poacher, initially suspected by Silas of stealing his money.
- Mrs Kimble: the sister of Squire Cass, and the doctor's wife, thus considered a double dignitary.
- Dr Kimble: the doctor of Raveloe, who attends when Molly is found dead.
- Bob Cass: the Squire's youngest son.
- Sally Oates: the wife of the town cobbler, who suffers from heart problems and dropsy. Silas gives her some herbal medicine that cures her, but also attracts unwanted attention from people who think he has magical powers.
- Mr Tookey: the assistant tailor and deputy clerk of the parish in Raveloe. He is young and insecure, and often the target of jokes and sarcasm from the other villagers. He tends to lose his temper when people do not take him seriously.

== Analysis ==
Lawrence Jay Dessner has drawn connections between the biographical circumstances of Eliot's life in relation to events in the novel. Bruce K. Martin has discussed Eliot's use of Godfrey Cass as "both parallel and foil" to Silas Marner in the structure of the novel. Fred C. Thomson has examined the multiple levels of the idea of alienation in the novel. Joseph Wiesenfarth has noted undercurrents of myth and legend, incorporated into a 'realistic' context, along with contrasts of responsible and irresponsible behaviour in the contrasting fates of Silas Marner and the Cass brothers. David Sonstroem has studied ideas of chance and Darwinian thinking in the context of the plot and character fates in the novel. Susan Stewart has looked at the influence of folktales and ideology related to 'work' vs 'labour' in the novel. Ian Milner has examined two overarching themes of Silas Marner's 'loss and recovery of his humanity', and of a conflict between stated moral values and the social realities juxtaposed with them. Robert H. Dunham has analysed the influence of the ideas and philosophy of William Wordsworth on the novel. Brian Swann has examined mythic and religious undertones in the novel. Jeff Nunokawa analyses ideas about physical touch, with respect to Silas Marner's handling of his gold compared to his raising of Eppie, and connects them to sexual and sensual themes. Kate E. Brown has discussed overarching themes of time and temporality, with respect to the interlocked stories of Godfrey Cass and Silas Marner.

== Adaptations ==
- At least five film adaptations of Silas Marner were released during the silent film era, including the following:
  - Silas Marner (Thanhouser Film Corporation, USA; 31 March 1911) with Frank Hall Crane in the title role.
  - Le Noël de Silas Marner (Pathé Frères, France; November 1912) (UK; 27 November 1912; as Silas Marner's Christmas).
  - Silas Marner (Edison Company, USA; 24 October 1913) with William Langdon West in the title role.
  - Silas Marner (Thanhouser Film Corporation, USA; 19 February 1916) with Frederick Warde in the title role.
  - Silas Marner (Associated Exhibitors, USA; May 1922) (UK; 25 January 1926) with Crauford Kent in the title role.
- The actor Michael Williams played Marner in a Focus on the Family Radio Theatre two-part adaptation for radio; this was to be the last acting role before his death. The production also featured Edward Woodward, Jenny Agutter, Alex Jennings and Timothy Bateson and has subsequently been re-broadcast on BBC Radio 7.
- W. S. Gilbert's play Dan'l Druce, Blacksmith (1876) takes its initial situation—the arrival of a child in a miser's life—from Silas Marner (as noted in the libretto), and has a somewhat similar ending, although the middle section is entirely new.
- The 1954 Indian film Bangaru Papa, in Telugu, starring S. V. Ranga Rao and Krishna Kumari, is also based on Palagummi Padmaraju's loose adaptation of Silas Marner.
- The composer John Joubert wrote an opera Silas Marner based on the novel in 1961.
- A stage version of Silas Marner adapted by playwright Gerald P. Murphy was published by Lazy Bee Scripts in 2010.
- The novel was adapted as Sukhdas in Hindi by the Indian writer Premchand.
- Ben Kingsley played Silas Marner in a 1985 BBC adaptation (broadcast in the US in 1987 by Masterpiece Theatre), with Patsy Kensit as the grown-up Eppie.
- The children's TV series Wishbone has an episode with an abridged adaptation.
- Steve Martin wrote, produced, and starred in a 1994 film adaptation of the novel, titled A Simple Twist of Fate.
- A stage version of Silas Marner, containing only text from the novel, was adapted by Mark Wheeller and published by Salamander Street in 2020.

== General and cited references ==
- (in Silas Marner and other novels of the era)
- John Mullan, "An introduction to Silas Marner: fairytale, realism and labour"
