= Romola =

1863 novel by George Eliot

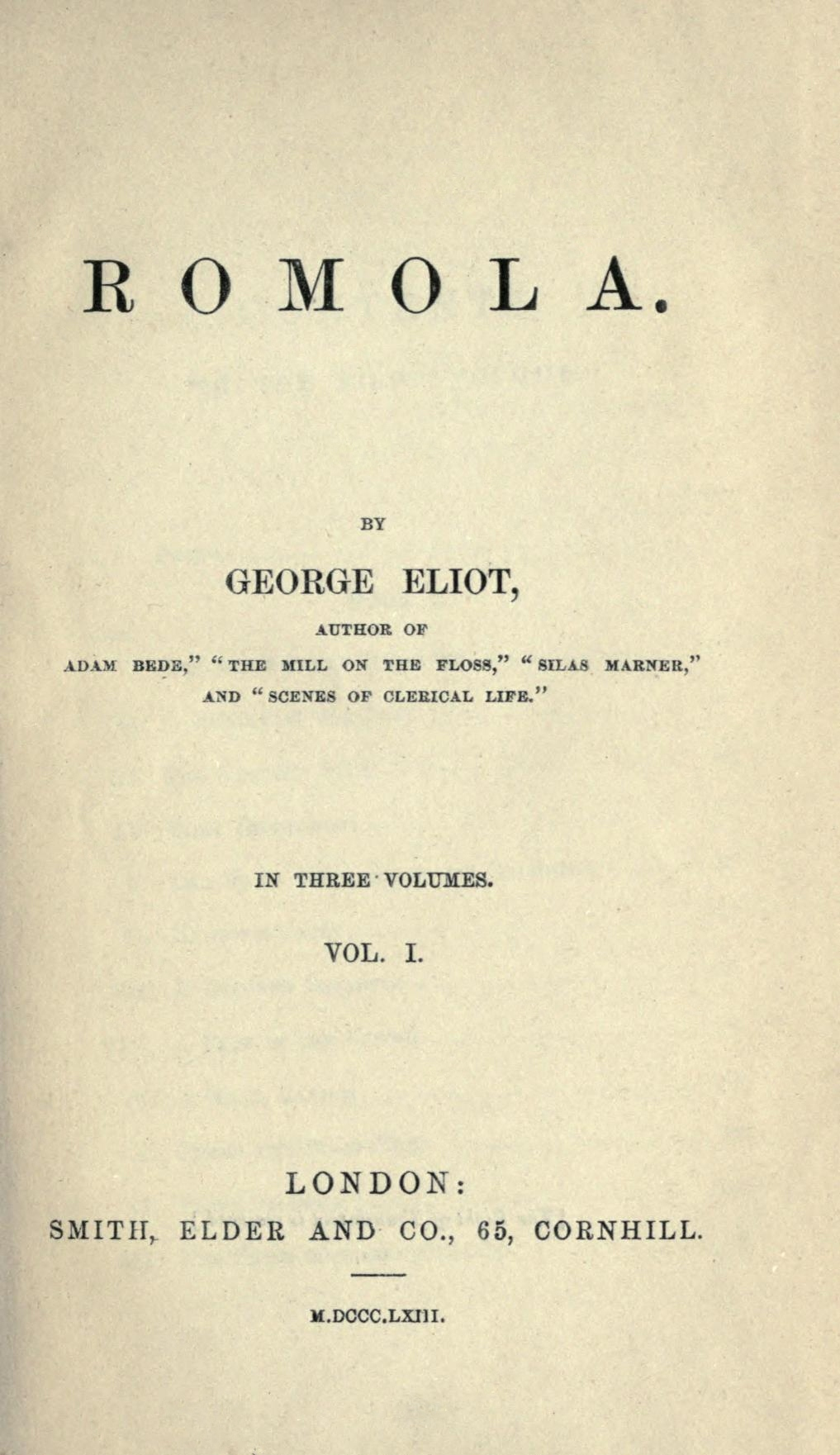
- Title page of the first edition, 1862–1863
- Author: George Eliot (aka Mary Ann Evans)
- Language: English
- Genre: Historical novel
- Publisher: Smith, Elder & Co.
- Publication date: 1862–63
- Publication place: United Kingdom
- Preceded by: Silas Marner
- Followed by: Felix Holt, the Radical

Romola is a historical novel written between 1862 and 1863 by English author Mary Ann Evans under the pen name of George Eliot set in the late fifteenth century, specifically the 1490s. It is "a deep study of life in the city of Florence from an intellectual, artistic, religious, and social point of view". The story takes place amidst actual historical events during the Italian Renaissance, and includes in its plot several notable figures from Florentine history.

The novel first appeared in fourteen parts published in Cornhill Magazine from July 1862 (vol. 6, no. 31) to August 1863 (vol. 8, no. 44), and was first published as a book, in three volumes, by Smith, Elder & Co. in 1863.

== Synopsis ==
Florence, 1492: Christopher Columbus has sailed towards the New World, and Florence has just mourned the death of its leader, Lorenzo de' Medici. In this setting, a Florentine trader meets a shipwrecked stranger, who introduces himself as Tito Melema, a young Italianate-Greek scholar. Tito becomes acquainted with several other Florentines, including Nello the barber and a young girl named Tessa. He is also introduced to a blind scholar named Bardo de' Bardi, and his daughter Romola. As Tito becomes settled in Florence, assisting Bardo with classical studies, he falls in love with Romola. However, Tessa falls in love with Tito, and the two are "married" in a mock ceremony.

Tito learns from Fra Luca, a Dominican friar, that his adoptive father has been forced into slavery and is asking for assistance. Tito introspects, comparing filial duty to his new ambitions in Florence, and decides that it would be futile to attempt to rescue his adoptive father. This paves the way for Romola and Tito to marry. Fra Luca shortly thereafter falls ill and before his death he speaks to his estranged sister, Romola. Ignorant of Romola's plans, Fra Luca warns her of a vision foretelling a marriage between her and a mysterious stranger who will bring pain to her and her father. After Fra Luca's death, Tito dismisses the warning and advises Romola to trust him. Tito and Romola become betrothed at the end of Carnival, to be married at Easter after Tito returns from a visit to Rome.

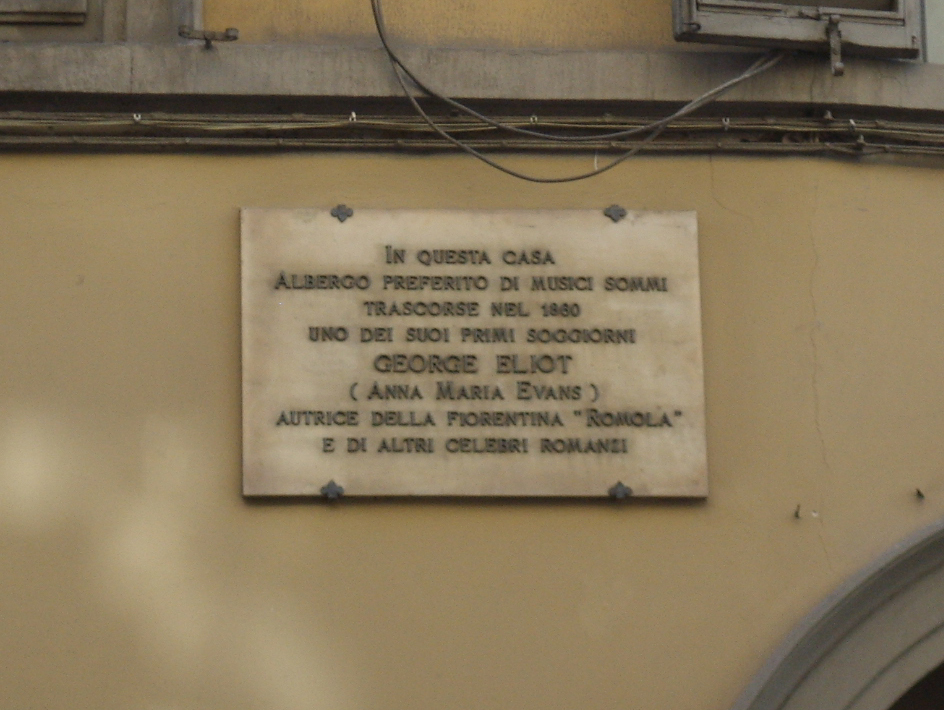
Plaque in Florence on the residence of George Eliot at the time of writing Romola

The novel then skips ahead to November 1494, more than eighteen months after the marriage. In that time, the French-Italian Wars have seen Florence enter uneasy times. Girolamo Savonarola preaches to Florentines about ridding the Church and the city of scourge and corruption, and drums up support for the new republican government. Piero de' Medici, Lorenzo de' Medici's son and successor to the lordship of Florence, has been driven from the city for his ignominious surrender to the invading French king, Charles VIII. The Medici palace is looted and the Medici family formally exiled from the city. In this setting, Tito, now a valued member of Florentine society, participates in the reception for the French invaders. Tito encounters an escaped prisoner, who turns out to be his adopted father, Baldassarre. Panicked and somewhat ashamed of his earlier inaction, Tito denies knowing the escaped prisoner and calls him a madman. Baldassarre escapes into the Duomo, where he swears revenge on his unfilial adoptive son. Growing ever more fearful, Tito plans to leave Florence. To do this, he betrays his late father-in-law, Bardo, who died some months earlier, by selling the late scholar's library. This reveals to Romola the true nature of her husband's character. She secretly leaves Tito and Florence, but is persuaded by Savonarola to return to fulfil her obligations to her marriage and her fellow Florentines. Nevertheless, the love between Romola and Tito has gone.

Again the action of the novel moves forward, from Christmas 1494 to October 1496. In that time, Florence has endured political upheaval, warfare and famine. Religious fervour has swept through Florence under the leadership of Savonarola, culminating in the Bonfire of the vanities. The League of Venice has declared war on the French king and his Italian ally, Florence. Starvation and disease run rampant through the city. Romola, now a supporter of Savonarola, helps the poor and sick where she can. Meanwhile, Tito is embroiled in a complex game of political manoeuvring and duplicitous allegiances in the new Florentine government. Mirroring this, he has escaped attempts by Baldassarre to both kill and expose him, and maintains a secret marriage to Tessa, with whom he has fathered two children. Romola becomes defiant of Tito, and the two manoeuvre to thwart each other's plans. Romola meets an enfeebled Baldassarre, who reveals Tito's past and leads her to Tessa.

Political turmoil erupts in Florence. Five supporters of the Medici family are sentenced to death, including Romola's godfather, Bernardo del Nero. She learns that Tito has played a role in their arrest. Romola pleads with Savonarola to intervene, but he refuses. Romola's faith in Savonarola and Florence is shaken, and once again she leaves the city. Meanwhile, Florence is under papal pressure to expel Savonarola. His arrest is effected by rioters, who then turn their attention to several of the city's political elite. Tito becomes a target of the rioters, but he escapes the mob by diving into the Arno River. However, upon leaving the river, Tito is killed by Baldassarre.

Romola makes her way to the coast. Emulating Gostanza in Boccaccio's Decameron (V, 2), she drifts out to sea in a small boat to die. However, the boat takes her to a small village affected by the Plague, and she helps the survivors. Romola's experience gives her a new purpose in life and she returns to Florence. Savonarola is tried for heresy and burned at the stake, but for Romola his influence remains inspiring. Romola takes care of Tessa and her two children, with the help of her older cousin. The story ends with Romola imparting advice to Tessa's son, based on her own experiences and the influences in her life.

== Characters in Romola ==
- Romola de' Bardi – Daughter of classical scholar Bardo de' Bardi who lives in Florence. She has an insular, non-religious upbringing, immersed in classical studies. She falls in love with Tito Melema and marries him, but she begins to rebel after gradually realizing his true character. Girolamo Savonarola later becomes a great influence in her life.
- Tito Melema – A handsome, young, Italianate-Greek scholar who arrives in Florence after being shipwrecked. He forsakes his adoptive father and makes a new life for himself in Florence. He marries Romola, and charms his way into the influential circles of Florence. He also "marries" Tessa in a mock ceremony. His sense of duty towards others is gradually replaced with ambition and self-preservation, earning the disdain of his wife and the vengeful anger of his adoptive father, Baldassarre.
- Baldassarre Calvo – Adoptive father of Tito Melema. Travelling at sea with Tito, his galley is attacked and Baldassarre is sold into slavery in Antioch. He is eventually brought in chains to Florence, where he escapes. He encounters Tito, who denies him and calls him a madman. Baldassarre, feeble yet fervent, becomes solely motivated by vengeance.
- Girolamo Savonarola – Charismatic Dominican preacher. He preaches to Florentines about religious piety and upcoming upheaval in Florence and the Church. Romola feels her life being guided by his influence, both direct and broad. Savonarola inspires the people of Florence at first, but the continuing hardship endured by the city leads to his persecution.
- Tessa – Young and naive Florentine girl. Her young life has been tragic up until she meets Tito Melema. She "marries" him in a mock wedding ceremony, but is treated as a secret, second wife. As Tito's relationship with Romola wanes, he increasingly seeks the company of the non-judgmental and ignorant Tessa, eventually preferring her to the virtuous and intelligent Romola.
- Bardo de' Bardi – Blind classical scholar living in Florence. He has one estranged son, Dino, and a daughter, Romola. Bardo is a descendant of the once-powerful Bardi family, but is living in poverty with his daughter, who helps him with his classical studies. He is an ally of the Medici family. He maintains a classical library, and tries to preserve it beyond his own death.
- Nello the barber – Florentine barber, who fancies his establishment as a meeting place for the Florentine intelligentsia and a forum for political and philosophical discussion. He is a staunch supporter of Tito Melema.
- Piero di Cosimo – Eccentric artist living in Florence. He paints a betrothal picture for Tito and Romola, representing them as Bacchus and Ariadne (though not in the style of Titian's Bacchus and Ariadne). He distrusts Tito, particularly since many other Florentines (especially Nello the barber) take a quick liking to him. He remains a good friend to Romola.
- Dino de' Bardi (aka Fra Luca) – Estranged son of Bardo de' Bardi. His father had hoped that Dino would also study classical literature, but instead Dino became a Dominican friar, estranging him from his non-religious family. Just before his death, he warns Romola against a future marriage that will bring her peril.
- Bratti Ferravecchi – Trader and iron scrap dealer (hence the name). He encounters Tito Melema, who has just arrived in Florence. Various characters in the story often buy and sell various items through him.
- Niccolò Machiavelli – In this story, Machiavelli often talks with Tito and other Florentines (particularly in Nello's shop) about all matters political and philosophical in Florence. His observations add a commentary to the ongoing events in the city.

== Major themes ==
Literary scholars have drawn comparisons between the setting of the novel and George Eliot's contemporary Victorian England: "Philosophically confused, morally uncertain, and culturally uprooted, [Florence] was a prototype of the upheaval of nineteenth-century England". Both Renaissance Florence and Victorian England were times of philosophical, religious and social turbulence. Renaissance Florence was therefore a convenient setting for a historical novel that allowed exotic characters and events to be examined in Victorian fashion.

Romola is the female protagonist through whom the surrounding world is evaluated. Contemporary and modern critics have questioned the likelihood of the level of scholarship attributed to women such as Romola in Renaissance Italy, and have pointed to the possible role of the title character as a Victorian critique of the constrained lot of women in that period, as well as in Eliot's contemporary period. Felicia Bonaparte speculated about the title character as a "thoroughly contemporary figure, the Victorian intellectual struggling to resolve the dilemmas of the modern age". In a similar vein, the story also deals with the dilemma of where the duty of obedience for women ends and the duty of resistance begins.

The psychological and religious introspection seen in Eliot's other novels is also seen in Romola. Richard Hutton, writing in The Spectator, in 1863, observed that "[t]he greatest artistic purpose of the story is to trace out the conflict between liberal culture and the more passionate form of the Christian faith in that strange era, which has so many points of resemblance with the present". The spiritual journey undertaken by the title character in some ways emulates Eliot's own religious struggle. In Romola, the title character has a non-religious and scholarly, yet insular, upbringing. She is gradually exposed to the wider religious world, which impacts her life at fortuitous moments. Yet continued immersion in religious life highlights its incompatibility with her own virtues, and by the end of the story she has adopted a humanist, empathic middle ground.

== Literary significance and criticism ==
Romola is George Eliot's fourth published novel. Set in Renaissance Italy, it is isolated from her other novels, which were set in 19th-century England. Also for the first time, George Eliot published her story in serialised format and with a different publisher. Smith, Elder & Co. reportedly paid Eliot £7,000 for the novel, but was less than satisfied with the commercial outcome. Richard Hutton, in the mid-19th century, acknowledged that Romola would never be one of her most popular novels. Nevertheless, Hutton described the novel as "one of the greatest works of modern fiction […] probably the author's greatest work".

George Eliot herself described her labour in writing the novel as one about which she could "swear by every sentence as having been written with my best blood, such as it is, and with the most ardent care for veracity of which my nature is capable". She reportedly spent eighteen months contemplating and researching the novel, including several excursions to Florence. The attention to detail exhibited in the novel was a focus of both praise and criticism. Anthony Trollope, having read the first instalment of Romola, expressed wonder at the toil Eliot must have "endured in getting up the work", but also cautioned her against excessive erudition, urging her not to "fire too much over the heads of her readers".

According to William Skidelsky, Observer's books editor, Romola is one of the ten best historical novels of all time.

== Film adaptation ==
- In 1924, the novel was adapted for a silent film starring Lillian Gish, William Powell, Ronald Colman and Dorothy Gish.
