= Samuel Balmford =

Samuel Balmford or Bamford (died 1657) was an English Puritan minister.

== Life ==
He was admitted to Emmanuel College, Cambridge in 1612, graduating B.A. in 1616 and M.A. in 1619. From the 1620s onwards he was a radical minister in the Netherlands, initially under the protection of Sir Horace Vere and his wife Lady Mary, in conflict with other English influences there. He became rector of St Alban's, Wood Street in London, in 1652.

== Works ==
He was the author of two sermons published in 1659, after his death, Habakkuk's Prayer applyed to the Churches present occasions, on Hab. iii. 2; and Christ's Counsel to the Church of Philadelphia, on Rev. iii. 11, preached before the Provincial Assembly at London. By that late reverend and faithful minister of Jesus Christ, Mr. Samuel Balmford, pastor of Albons, Wood Street. From Thomas Parsons's address to the reader, it appears that the two sermons were intended as a first installment of a collected edition of Balmford's writings; but nothing more was published.
