= Taplin =

Taplin is a family name. People with the surname Taplin include:

- Bralon Taplin (born 1992), Grenadian sprinter
- Cheryl Taplin (born 1972), American track and field athlete
- Rev. George Taplin (1831–1879), Australian Congregationalist minister and anthropologist
- John Ferguson Taplin (1914–2008), American businessman, repeated donor to Harvard Medical School
- Jonathan Taplin (born 1947), American writer, film producer and scholar
- Kim Taplin (born 1943), English poet and non-fiction writer
- Leonard Taplin (1895–1961), South Australian pilot during World War I
- Louise Taplin (1855–1901), English-born Australian nurse
- Mark Taplin, American government official and diplomat
- Mary-Ellen B. Taplin (born 1960), American research oncologist
- Millicent Taplin (1902–1980), British ceramicist
- Oliver Taplin (born 1943), British academic and classicist
- Ted Taplin, Australian rugby league footballer
- Walter Taplin (1910–1986), British editor of The Spectator between 1953 and 1954
- Rabbi Yisroel Taplin, American Talmud scholar and author

== See also ==
- Taplin, West Virginia
