= Cosmopolitan Club (London) =

London conversation club, 1852–1902

- Formation: 1852
- Dissolved: 1902
- Type: Private conversation club
- Purpose: Conversation and society
- Headquarters: 30 Charles Street, Mayfair (from c. 1854)
- Location: London, England
- Members: Limited to 150

The Cosmopolitan Club was a London conversation club that existed from 1852 to 1902. Founded by a circle around the diplomatist Sir Robert Morier, it became one of the best known of the Victorian "talking clubs", meeting late at night for conversation among a membership drawn from politics, diplomacy, literature and the arts. From about 1854 it occupied the former studio of the painter George Frederic Watts at 30 Charles Street, off Berkeley Square.

== Foundation ==
The club grew out of a group of friends who met in the rooms of Robert Morier at 49 Bond Street, and in 1852 resolved to expand their coterie into an exclusive social club. About 1854 it leased rooms at 30 Charles Street, Berkeley Square, which had been the studio of George Frederic Watts and afterwards of the portrait painter Henry Wyndham Phillips, who became the club's honorary secretary. Phillips, a son of the Royal Academician Thomas Phillips, was remembered at his death in December 1868 as one of the founders of the club, as well as the commanding officer of the 2nd Middlesex (Artists') Rifle Volunteers.

== Membership and customs ==
Membership was limited to 150, at a subscription of three guineas a year. By 1862 the club had about 120 members. To avoid blackballing, the names of candidates were circulated to all members, who could mark as many names as there were vacancies; those receiving the most votes were elected. The club was open only twice a week, on Wednesdays and Sundays, from 10 p.m. until 2 a.m.

It was celebrated above all for conversation; Henry James called it "a talking club, extremely select". Members were encouraged to bring guests, who enjoyed full privileges including free drink and tobacco; the American diplomat Benjamin Moran thought it "the most social club in London". Frederic Harrison recalled it as a place where one was sure to meet any foreigner or colonial of distinction then visiting London. Many members came late, fresh from dining out, and Thackeray joked that they arrived at midnight in white ties as though they had just been dining with the aristocracy. The diarist Arthur Munby recorded the club in full spate at midnight, including a tipsy Monckton Milnes disparaging the rival Athenaeum.

Writing in Fraser's Magazine in March 1866, an observer described the Cosmopolitan as a club for smoking and conversation that had taken root and come to exert no small influence on opinion, and listed the public men a visitor might find there in animated talk between ten and midnight on a single evening—among them Lord Stanley, John Bright, Earl de Grey, Thomas Hughes, A. H. Layard, William Harcourt, Higgins, Venables, Sir Henry Rawlinson, Laurence Oliphant, Lord Arthur Russell, Stirling of Keir, Millais, Kinglake, Lord Houghton and Robert Lowe.

Although the club had no formal political character, many of its members were Liberals, several of whom served in Gladstone's cabinets.

The Cosmopolitan belonged to a cluster of mid-Victorian clubs given over to conversation rather than dining, and it served as a model for others. The Century Club, founded in 1865 by Frederic Harrison for Liberal and reforming men, was built along the same lines—offering no dinners and existing for talk—and met on the same two evenings of the week as the Cosmopolitan, but during the parliamentary recess rather than the session, so that a member might belong to both. Its membership overlapped with this wider intellectual clubland: Leslie Stephen, for one, belonged to the Cosmopolitan, the Century and the conversation-centred Savile Club (founded 1868) alike, and, like others, gave up the Cosmopolitan in the 1870s on his election to the more august Athenaeum.

== Premises and the Watts painting ==
The club occupied a single large room with a lofty, skylit ceiling, dominated by a huge painting that Watts had left behind, depicting a naked woman in distress. The picture, Watts's A Story from Boccaccio, shows a woman fleeing towards a group of classically dressed figures; it was presented to the nation when the club closed and is now in the collection of Tate.

== Exhibition of rejected pictures ==
Although it was not an exhibiting society, the club's room was on occasion lent for displays of pictures. In May 1863 the members gave up about two sides of their large room to an exhibition of paintings that had been refused space at that year's Royal Academy exhibition—rejected, the organisers maintained, for want of wall room rather than for any want of merit. The Observer counted twenty-six pictures, several by artists of the Pre-Raphaelite school.

The press was divided over the venture. The Examiner sympathised with the undertaking but found the result dispiriting, describing a private view reached up a dark staircase into the club's crowded single room, with two or three dozen pictures hung on a couple of the walls. The Standard questioned the wisdom of the show, wondering whether the contributors had allowed themselves to be made a "catspaw" by the Academy, while The Era, reviewing the exhibition at the end of the month, noticed the individual pictures at length.

== Notable members ==
The membership was drawn from the political, diplomatic, literary and artistic worlds. They included:

- Politics and public life: William Ewart Gladstone, John Bright, Joseph Chamberlain, Sir William Harcourt, W. E. Forster, G. J. Goschen, Lord Aberdare, Lord Carlingford, Lord Dufferin, Lord Ripon, Sir M. E. Grant Duff, Evelyn Ashley, William Cornwallis Cartwright, Lord Stanley, Lord Arthur Russell and Robert Lowe
- Diplomacy and travel: Sir Robert Morier, Sir Henry Layard, Laurence Oliphant, Julian Fane and Sir Henry Rawlinson
- Literature and scholarship: Anthony Trollope, Robert Browning, Edward FitzGerald, Francis Turner Palgrave, James Anthony Froude, James Spedding, Matthew James Higgins ("Jacob Omnium"), Tom Taylor, Lord Houghton, Thomas Henry Huxley, Moberly Bell, Thomas Hughes, George Stovin Venables, William Stirling-Maxwell and Alexander Kinglake, Henry Maine and Leslie Stephen
- Art: George Frederic Watts, Frederic Leighton, Henry Wyndham Phillips and John Everett Millais
- Royalty: Albert Edward, Prince of Wales, who joined in 1865.

== In literature ==
The Cosmopolitan is generally identified as the model for "The Universe", described in Trollope's novel Phineas Redux (1873) as the club "where the best informed political gossip is heard". Trollope—himself a devoted member, who drew on the club's political talk for his Palliser novels—gives the Universe as open only for the hour either side of midnight on two evenings a week, its conversation "listless and often desultory" yet much prized by those who attended.

== Closure ==
The club was dissolved in 1902. On its closure the Watts painting that had hung in its room was given to the nation.
