= Samuel Laurence =

British portrait painter (1812–1884)

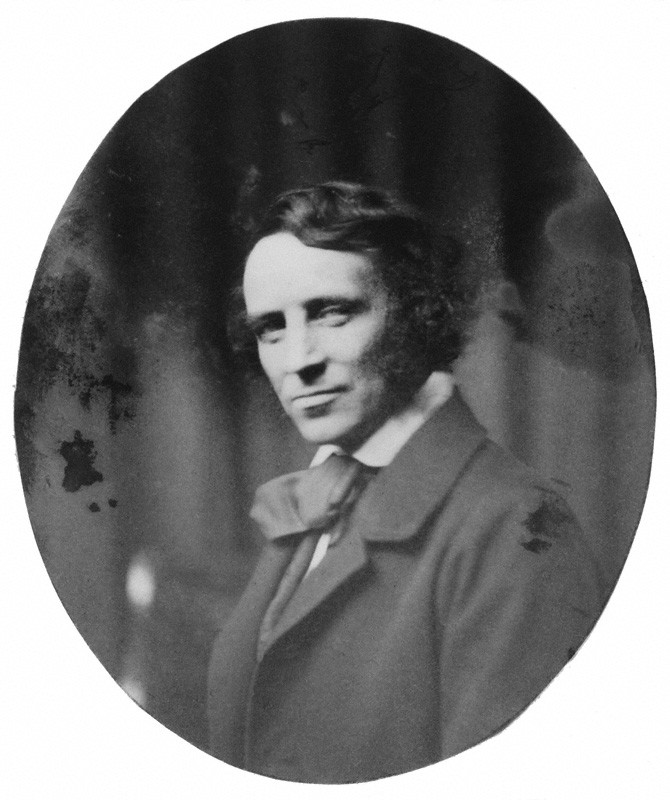
- Born: 1812; Guildford, Surrey, England
- Died: 28 February 1884; London, England
- Known for: Portrait painter
- Spouse: Anastasia Gliddon

Samuel Laurence (also spelled Lawrence; 1812–28 February 1884) was a British portrait painter.

== Life ==
He was born at Guildford, Surrey, in 1812, and early manifested a great love for art. The first portraits which he exhibited were at the Society of British Artists in 1834, but in 1836 he sent three portraits, including that of Mrs. Somerville, to the exhibition of the Royal Academy.

These were followed at the academy by portraits of the Right Hon. Thomas Erskine, 1838; Thomas Carlyle, 1841; Sir Frederick Pollock, bart., 1842 and 1847; Charles Babbage, 1845; Dr. William Whewell, 1847; James Spedding, 1860; the Rev. William Hepworth Thompson, master of Trinity, and Robert Browning, 1869; Sir Thomas Watson, bart., M.D., 1870; and the Rev. Frederick Denison Maurice, 1871. He exhibited also crayon drawings of Charles Dickens ('Sketch of Boz'), 1838; John Hullah, 1842; Professor Adam Sedgwick, 1845; the Rev. Frederick Denison Maurice, 1846; George Grote, 1849; Lord Ashburton and Bernard Barton, 1850; Sir Henry Taylor, 1852; Sir William Bowman, bart., 1853; Sir Frederick Pollock and Lady Pollock, 1863; James Anthony Froude, Rev. Hugh Stowell, and William Makepeace Thackeray, 1864; Anthony Trollope, 1865; Sir Henry Cole and Dean John Howson, 1866; William Spottiswoode, 1869; Lord-justice Sir Edward Fry, 1871; and Sir Theodore Martin, 1875. He ceased to exhibit at Suffolk Street in 1853, but his works continued to appear at the Royal Academy until 1882, when he sent a drawing of Mrs. Cross ('George Eliot'), made in 1860.

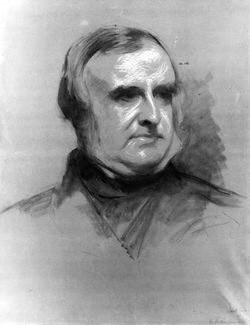
A portrait of Jacob Omnium by Laurence

Early in life Laurence was brought into close relations with many of the eminent literary men of his time, and was on terms of great intimacy with George Henry Lewes and Thornton Leigh Hunt; but his most intimate friend was James Spedding, the editor of Bacon. Many of his portraits of them have been engraved, the best-known being those of Thackeray reading a letter, Carlyle writing at his desk, Harriet lady Ashburton (in Lord Houghton's 'Monographs'), Frederick Denison Maurice, Mrs. Gaskell, Archbishop Trench, and William Edward Forster. His portraits of Tennyson and Carlyle are engraved in Home's 'New Spirit of the Age,' 1844. One of his most successful portraits in oil is that of Leigh Hunt, painted in 1837, but never quite finished. It was exhibited in the National Portrait Exhibition of 1868, and photographed for Leigh Hunt's 'Correspondence,' published in 1862.

He died at 6 Wells Street, Oxford Street, London, from the effects of an operation, on 28 February 1884, in the seventy-second year of his age.

== Family ==
Laurence married Anastasia Gliddon, cousin and adopted sister of Mrs. Thornton Leigh Hunt, and during his early married life he visited Florence and Venice. There, he diligently studied the methods of the old masters, and endeavouring to discover the secrets of their success. In 1854, he visited the United States, and while staying at Longfellow's residence in Massachusetts, he drew a portrait of James Russell Lowell, which has been engraved.

== Legacy ==
There are by him in the National Portrait Gallery portraits in oil of Charles Babbage and Sir Thomas Bourchier, R.N., and an unfinished head of Thackeray, as well as chalk drawings of Sir Frederick Pollock, bart., and Sir Charles Wheatstone, and an unfinished sketch of Matthew James Higgins ('Jacob Omnium'). The Scottish National Portrait Gallery has a head in crayons of Thomas Carlyle. His portrait of Dr. Whewell is in Trinity College, Cambridge, and one of Thackeray is in the Reform Club, London.
