= Omnium (disambiguation) =

Omnium (Latin: of all, belonging to all) may refer to:

- Omnium, a multiple race event in track cycling in which all contestants compete against each other in six different disciplines.
- Òmnium Cultural, an association promoting the Catalan language
- Omnium II, a Thoroughbred racehorse
- Omnium, a 2005 concept album released by Teatro ZinZanni
- Omnium, the "fundamental substance of the Universe" in the novel The Third Policeman by Flann O'Brien
- Omnium, a type of government bond involved in the Great Stock Exchange Fraud of 1814
- Omnium, a type of fictional automated robot factory in the game Overwatch (2016 video game)

== See also ==
- Duke of Omnium, an aristocratic title in the Palliser novels of Anthony Trollope
- Jacob Omnium, pen name of British writer Matthew James Higgins (1810-1868)
