= Caroline Phillipson =

British poet and novelist

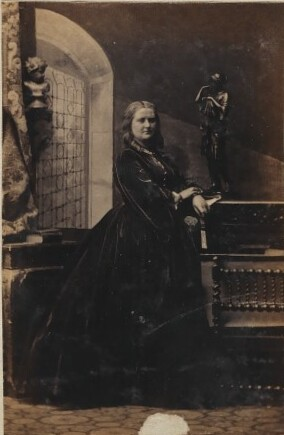
- Born: 1823; Montgomeryshire
- Died: 1893 (aged 69–70); Italy
- Occupation: Novelist
- Spouse(s): John Phillipson

Caroline Giffard Phillipson (1823 – 1893) was a British poet and novelist.

== Early life ==
Caroline Giffard (Note: Sources sometimes spell her name "Gifford", but it is spelled "Giffard" on the title pages of her books.) Lethbridge was born on 1823 in Montgomeryshire, Wales. She was the eldest of eighteen children of Sir John Hesketh Lethbridge, 3rd Baronet. Her mother was Lethbridge's first wife, Harriet Mytton. In 1849, Caroline Lethbridge married John Tharp Burton Phillipson, with the wedding taking place in Paris, France.

== Career ==
Caroline Phillipson wrote four books of poetry. The first, Lonely Hours (1856), was labelled "sentimental doggerel" in a negative review by novelist George Eliot in the Westminster Review. An enraged Phillipson published a pamphlet called A Song in Prose to the Westminster Owl. Though the anonymous review was by Eliot, Phillipson assumed it had been written by her partner George Henry Lewes and the pamphlet was a lengthy denunciation of Lewes.

A later volume, Songs on Italy (1862), was full of fulsome praise of Italian patriot Giuseppe Garibaldi. A 20th century critic wrote that Phillipson "maltreated the Muses most frightfully." Correspondence between Garibaldi and Phillipson is owned by the Museo Civico di Sanremo.

Phillipson wrote one work of fiction, Ethel Beranger (1858), which The Athenaeum called "a very silly novel."

== Death ==
Phillipson died in 1893 in Italy.

== Bibliography ==
- Lonely Hours, 1856.
- A Song in Prose to the Westminster Owl, on the Criticism of the 'Westminster Review' of July, 1856, on 'Lonely Hours, Poems by Caroline Giffard Phillipson. London: Moxon,1856.
- Eva, a Romance in Rhyme, and other Poems. London: Moxon, 1857.
- Ethel Beranger: A Novel. 2 vol. London: T. C. Newby, 1858.
- Songs on Italy, and Other Poems, London: Robert Hardwicke, 1862
- Mental Flights: A Volume of Verse, Political and Sentimental, London: Chapman & Hall, 1871.
