= Matthew Higgins =

Matthew or Matt Higgins may refer to:

- Matt Higgins (businessman), president and CEO of RSE Ventures
- Matt Higgins, a character in the film Angel on My Shoulder
- Matt Higgins (ice hockey) (born 1977), Canadian ice hockey centre
- Matthew James Higgins (1810–1868), British writer
- Matthew Higgins (cyclist) in Node 4-Giordana Racing
