= Freddy Gray =

Deputy editor of The Spectator

- Born: 10 January 1980 (age 46)
- Education: Bradfield College; University of St Andrews
- Occupation: Journalist
- Known for: Deputy editor, The Spectator

Freddy Gray (born 10 January 1980), is a British journalist, deputy editor of The Spectator and the primary editor of its US edition, Spectator World.

== Early life ==
Gray was educated at Bradfield College, an independent school in Berkshire, followed by the University of St Andrews.

== Career ==
Beginning his career at Mizz magazine, Gray later moved on to work at the Catholic Herald. Later, he worked as a literary editor for The American Conservative.

Gray was appointed as the deputy editor of The Spectator in 2014. He is the founding editor of the Spectator's world edition and later spear-headed the introduction of its print edition. He expressed a desire that it should not contain any strong bias concerning the presidency of Donald Trump and it should eschew any attempt to exert influence over the future of American conservatism.

Gray is the current host of the Spectator's Americano podcast.

Gray was a prominent ally of fellow journalist Toby Young during the controversy leading up to Young's resignation from his post at the Office for Students.

== Political views ==
Gray has in the past described himself as a "free-speech enthusiast".
