= The Spectator =

British weekly political and cultural news magazine

- The Spectator 25 April 2020 cover
- Editor: Michael Gove
- Categories: Politics, culture
- Frequency: Weekly
- Publisher: Freddie Sayers
- Paid circulation: 106,556
- Unpaid circulation: 1,185
- Total circulation: 107,812 (2023)
- Founder: Robert Stephen Rintoul
- First issue: 6 July 1828; 198 years ago
- Company: Old Queen Street Ventures Limited
- Country: United Kingdom
- Based in: 22 Old Queen Street, Westminster, London
- Language: English
- Website: spectator.com; spectator.com.au
- ISSN: 0038-6952
- OCLC: 1766325

The Spectator is a weekly British political and cultural news magazine. It was first published in July 1828, making it the oldest surviving magazine in the world. The Spectator is politically conservative, and its principal subject areas are politics and culture. Alongside columns and features on current affairs, the magazine also contains arts pages on books, music, opera, film, and TV reviews. It had an average circulation of 107,812 as of December 2023, excluding Australia.

Editorship of the magazine has often been a platform to high office in the Conservative Party in the United Kingdom; its past editors include Boris Johnson (1999–2005) and other former cabinet members Ian Gilmour (1954–1959), Iain Macleod (1963–1965), and Nigel Lawson (1966–1970). The former Conservative MP Michael Gove took over from Fraser Nelson as editor on 4 October 2024.

Today, the magazine is a print-digital hybrid. In 2020, The Spectator became the longest-lived current affairs magazine in history (overtaking The Gentleman's Magazine, which published from 1731 to 1922), and was also the first magazine ever to publish 10,000 issues. In September 2024, The Spectator was acquired by British hedge fund manager Paul Marshall, owner of UnHerd and co-owner of GB News.

== History ==
=== Robert Stephen Rintoul ===
The Spectator's founder, Scottish reformer Robert Stephen Rintoul, former editor of the Dundee Advertiser and the London-based Atlas, launched the paper on 6 July 1828. Rintoul consciously revived the title from the celebrated, if short-lived, daily publication by Joseph Addison and Richard Steele. As he had long been determined "to edit a perfect newspaper", Rintoul initially insisted on "absolute power" over content, commencing a long-lasting tradition of the paper's editor and proprietor being one and the same person. Although he wrote little himself, "every line and word passed through the alembic of his brain."

The Spectator's political outlook in its first thirty years reflected Rintoul's liberal-radical agenda. Despite its political stance, it was widely regarded and respected for its non-partisanship, in both its political and cultural criticism. Rintoul initially advertised his new title as a "family paper", the euphemistic term for a journal free from strong political rhetoric, but events soon compelled him to confess that it was no longer possible to be "a mere Spectator". Two years into its existence, The Spectator came out strongly for wide-reaching parliamentary reform: it produced supplements detailing vested interests in the Commons and Lords, coined the well-known phrase "The Bill, the whole Bill and nothing but the Bill", and helped drive through the Great Reform Act of 1832. Virulently anti-Tory in its politics, The Spectator strongly objected to the appointment of the Duke of Wellington as prime minister, condemning him as "a Field Marshal whose political career proves him to be utterly destitute of political principle – whose military career affords ample evidence of his stern and remorseless temperament."

The paper spent its first century at premises on Wellington Street (now Lancaster Place). Despite its robust criticism of the Conservative Party leader Robert Peel for several years, The Spectator rallied behind him when he split the Tory party by successfully repealing the Corn Laws. Rintoul's fundamental principles were freedom of the individual, freedom of the press and freedom of trade, of religious tolerance and freedom from blind political adherence. The magazine was vocal in its opposition to the First Opium War (1839–1842), commenting that "all the alleged aims of the expedition against China are vague, illimitable, and incapable of explanation, save only that of making the Chinese pay the opium-smugglers." The magazine further wrote: "There does not appear to be much glory gained in a contest so unequal that hundreds are killed on one side and none on the other. What honour is there in going to shoot men, certain that they cannot hurt you? The cause of the war, be it remembered, is as disreputable as the strength of the parties is unequal. The war is undertaken in support of a co-partnery of opium-smugglers, in which the Anglo-Indian Government may be considered as the principal partner."

In 1853, The Spectator's lead book reviewer George Brimley published an anonymous and unfavourable notice of Charles Dickens's Bleak House, typical of the paper's enduring contempt for him as a "popular" writer "amusing the idle hours of the greatest number of readers; not, we may hope, without improvement to their hearts, but certainly without profoundly affecting their intellects or deeply stirring their emotions." Rintoul died in April 1858, having sold the magazine two months earlier. The circulation had already been falling, under particular pressure from its new rival, The Saturday Review. Its new owner, the 27-year-old John Addyes Scott, kept the purchase quiet, but Rintoul's death made explicit the change of guard. His tenure was unremarkable, and subscribers continued to fall. By the end of the year, Scott sought his escape, selling the title for £4,200 in December 1858 (equivalent to £451,238 in 2025) to two British-based Americans, James McHenry and Benjamin Moran. While McHenry was a businessman, Moran was an assistant secretary to the American ambassador, George M. Dallas; they saw their purchase as a means to influence British opinion on American affairs.

The editor was Thornton Leigh Hunt, a friend of Moran who had also worked for Rintoul. Hunt was also nominally the purchaser, having been given the necessary monies in an attempt by McHenry and Moran to disguise the American ownership. Circulation declined with this loss of independence and inspirational leadership, as the views of James Buchanan, then President of the United States, came to the fore. Within weeks, as the last pre-American ownership issue appears to have been that of 25 December 1858. the editorial line followed Buchanan's pronouncements in being "neither pro-slavery nor pro-abolitionist. To unsympathetic observers Buchanan's policy seemed to apportion blame for the impasse on the slavery question equally on pro-slavery and abolitionist factions – and rather than work out a solution, simply to argue that a solution would take time. The Spectator now would publicly support that 'policy'". This set it at odds with most of the British press, but gained it the sympathy of expatriate Americans in the country. Richard Fulton notes that from then until 1861, "the Spectator's commentary on American affairs read like a Buchanan administration propaganda sheet." and that this represented a volte-face. Under Hunt's tenure, The Spectator may even have been steered by financial support from the court of Napoleon III.

=== Meredith Townsend, Richard Holt Hutton, and John St Loe Strachey ===
The need to promote the Buchanan position in Britain had been reduced as British papers such as The Times and The Saturday Review turned in his favour, fearing the potential effects of a split in the Union. As Abraham Lincoln was set to succeed the vacillating Buchanan after the 1860 United States presidential election, the owners decided to stop pumping money into a loss-making publication: as Moran confided to his diary, "it don't pay, never did since Hunt became its owner." On 19 January 1861, The Spectator was sold to a journalist, Meredith Townsend, for the marked-down sum of £2,000. Though not yet thirty, Townsend had spent the previous decade as an editor in India, and was prepared to restore to the paper an independent voice in a fast-changing world. From the outset, Townsend took up an anti-Buchanan, anti-slavery position, arguing that his unwillingness to act decisively had been a weakness and a contributor to the problems apparent in the US. He soon went into partnership with Richard Holt Hutton, the editor of The Economist, whose primary interests were literature and theology. Hutton's close friend William Gladstone later called him "the first critic of the nineteenth century". Townsend's writing in The Spectator confirmed him as one of the finest journalists of his day, and he has since been called "the greatest leader writer ever to appear in the English Press."

The two men remained co-proprietors and joint editors for 25 years, taking a strong stand on some of the most controversial issues of their day. They supported the Union against the Confederacy in the American Civil War, an unpopular position which, at the time, did serious damage to the paper's circulation, reduced to some 1,000 readers. The issue of 25 January 1862, published in the wake of the Trent Affair, argued that "The Southern Bid" for active support in return for an Abolition promise, "demands careful examination". In time, the paper regained readers when the victory of the North validated its principled stance. They also launched an all-out assault on Benjamin Disraeli, accusing him in a series of leaders of jettisoning ethics for politics by ignoring the atrocities committed against Bulgarian civilians by the Ottoman Empire in the 1870s.

In 1886, The Spectator parted company with William Ewart Gladstone when he declared his support for Irish Home Rule. Committed to defending the Union ahead of the Liberal Party line, Townsend and Hutton aligned themselves with the Liberal Unionist wing. As a result, H. H. Asquith (the future Prime Minister), who had served as a leader-writer for 10 years, left his post. Townsend was succeeded by a young journalist named John St Loe Strachey, who would remain associated with the paper for the next 40 years. When Hutton died in 1897, Strachey became co-owner with Townsend; by the end of the year Strachey was made sole editor and proprietor. As chief leader-writer, general manager, literary critic and all things beside, Strachey embodied the spirit of The Spectator until the 1920s. Among his various schemes were the establishment of a Spectator Experimental Company, to show that new soldiers could be trained up to excellence in six months, the running of a Cheap Cottage Exhibition, which laid the foundations for Letchworth Garden City, and the impassioned defence of Free Trade against Joseph Chamberlain's protectionist 'Tariff Reform' programme.

Within two years he had doubled the paper's circulation, which peaked at 23,000. In the early decades of the twentieth century it was heralded as "the most influential of all the London weeklies". The First World War put the paper and its editor under great strain: after the conflict it seemed to be behind the times, and circulation began to fall away. Even the introduction of signed articles, overturning the paper's fixed policy of anonymity for its first century, did little to help. After years of illness, Strachey decided at the end of 1924 to sell his controlling interest in the paper to his recently appointed business manager, Evelyn Wrench. Although he gained a second wind as a novelist, Strachey died two years later in 1928.

== 1925–1975 ==
=== Evelyn Wrench and Wilson Harris ===
For his first year as proprietor, John Evelyn Wrench appointed John (Jack) Atkins his editor, who had worked on the paper for the last two decades, acting as editor during Strachey's recurrent bouts of illness. But the relationship did not work: as Atkins lamented to his long-standing friend, Winston Churchill, Wrench "continually wants to interfere and he is very ignorant". Wrench duly took over the editorship in 1926, successfully channeling the enthusiasm of Strachey. His global connections helped secure interviews with Henry Ford, Mahatma Gandhi and Benito Mussolini. Perhaps his most remembered achievement as editor of The Spectator was the campaign to ease unemployment in the mining town of Aberdare, one of the worst hit by the crisis of 1928, when joblessness reached 40% in South Wales. Within three months, the paper's appeal for the town's relief raised over £12,000 (equivalent to £651,789 in 2025). A statuette of an Aberdare miner, presented in gratitude to The Spectator, still sits in the editor's office, bearing the inscription: "From the Townsfolk of Aberdare in Grateful Recognition: 'The Greatest of These is Love'".

Wrench retired as editor in 1932 (he remained the magazine's proprietor), appointing the political editor Wilson Harris his successor. Under Harris The Spectator became increasingly outspoken on developing international politics in the 1930s, in particular on the rise of fascism. Beneath a reader's letter referring to the Nazi Party as "peaceful, orderly and kindly", Harris printed the following reply:

No facts in recent history are established more incontestably ... than the numerous cases of murder, assault, and various forms of intimidation for which the National Socialist Party in Germany has been responsible ... The organized economic boycott of the Jews is the climax. The Spectator has consistently shown itself a friend of Germany, but it is a friend of freedom first. Resort to violence is not condoned by styling it revolution.

Harris broadly supported the European foreign policy of the Chamberlain ministry and Neville Chamberlain's appeasement. He praised the Munich Agreement, explaining later that he believed "even the most desperate attempt to save the peace was worthwhile". Harris abandoned the newspaper's support for appeasement after the Kristallnacht pogrom, which Harris wrote "obliterated the word appeasement." When the conflict broke, the team abandoned their Gower Street office for Harmondsworth, but within a few days decided to return to London: the basement caught fire from shrapnel, and the printers were bombed, but the paper continued to appear each week. Although the Second World War required The Spectator to downgrade its size and paper quality, its readership doubled during the conflict, exceeding 50,000. From 1945 to 1950, Harris served as MP for Cambridge University; although he stood as an independent, this was the first formal overlap between The Spectator and the House of Commons. In February 1947, when a fuel shortage suspended the publication of weekly magazines, The Spectator appeared in an abridged form over two successive Thursdays on page 2 of the Daily Mail.

=== Ian Gilmour ===
In 1954, Wrench and his co-owner Angus Watson sold The Spectator to the barrister Ian Gilmour, who restored the Spectator tradition of simultaneously acting as editor. Having a libertarian and pro-European outlook, he "enlivened the paper and injected a new element of irreverence, fun and controversy". He was critical of both Anthony Eden's and Harold Macmillan's governments, and while supporting the Conservatives was also friendly to Hugh Gaitskell and Gaitskellism. Gilmour lent The Spectator's voice to the campaign to end capital punishment in Britain, writing an incensed leader attacking the hanging of Ruth Ellis in 1955, in which he claimed "Hanging has become the national sport", and that the home secretary Gwilym Lloyd George, for not reprieving the sentence, "has now been responsible for the hanging of two women over the past eight months".

The Spectator opposed Britain's involvement in the Suez Crisis in 1956, strongly criticising the government's handling of the debacle. The paper went on to oppose Macmillan's government's re-election in the 1959 United Kingdom general election, complaining: "The continued Conservative pretence that Suez was a good, a noble, a wise venture has been too much to stomach ... the Government is taking its stand on a solid principle: 'Never admit a mistake.'" The paper also says that it was influential in campaigning for the decriminalisation of homosexuality. It gave vocal support to the proposals of the Wolfenden Committee in 1957, condemning the "utterly irrational and illogical" old laws on homosexuality: "Not only is the law unjust in conception, it is almost inevitably unjust in practice."

In March 1957, Jenny Nicholson, a frequent contributor, wrote a piece on the Italian Socialist Party congress in Venice, which mentioned three Labour Party politicians (Aneurin Bevan, Richard Crossman, and Morgan Phillips) "who puzzled the Italians by filling themselves like tanks with whisky and coffee". All three sued for libel, the case went to trial, and The Spectator was forced to make a large payment in damages and costs, a sum well over the equivalent of £150,000 today. It has since emerged that "all three plaintiffs, to a greater or lesser degree, perjured themselves in court".

Gilmour gave up the editorship in 1959, in part to abet his chance of selection as a Conservative MP. He appointed his deputy Brian Inglis, who introduced to the magazine a fresh spirit of political satire. In 1959—much to the embarrassment of Gilmour (who remained the owner)—The Spectator advised either voting for the Liberal Party or tactically abstaining. Despite a marked increase in sales, Gilmour felt that The Spectator was losing its political edge, so replaced him in 1962 with Iain Hamilton. Hamilton successfully balanced a keener focus on current affairs with some more raucous contributions as the young team behind Private Eye were commissioned to write a mock eight-page Child's Guide to Modern Culture. Much to the shock of Hamilton and the Spectator staff, Gilmour replaced Hamilton in 1963 with Iain Macleod, the Conservative MP who had resigned from the cabinet on the controversial appointment of Sir Alec Douglas-Home to succeed Harold Macmillan as prime minister. A widely circulated letter, signed by Spectator journalists and board members, berated Gilmour for mistreating an admired editor and appointing an active politician who could jeopardise the independence of the magazine: "We believe strongly that The Spectator, with its long and honourable history of independent opinion, should not be tossed about at the whim of the proprietor or lose its independence by identification with a narrow political faction."

=== "The Tory Leadership" article ===
Two months into his post, in January 1964, Macleod intensified the shock by revealing the behind-the-scenes machinations of the Conservative party. In a long article entitled "The Tory Leadership", ostensibly a review of a new book (The Fight for the Tory Leadership) by Randolph Churchill, Macleod laid out his version of events in great detail. In disclosing, from the horse's mouth, the mysterious circumstances of Douglas-Home's appointment, the article caused an immediate sensation. Churchill's book was all but obliterated by the review, which said that "four fifths" of it "could have been compiled by anyone with a pair of scissors, a pot of paste and a built-in prejudice against Mr Butler and Sir William Haley". That week's edition, bearing the headline "Iain Macleod, What Happened", sold a record number of copies.

=== Nigel Lawson, George Gale, and Harry Creighton ===
The "Tory Leadership" article prompted a furious response from many Spectator readers and caused Macleod, for a time, to be shunned by political colleagues. He eventually regained his party's favour, however, and rejoined the shadow cabinet in the same year. On his appointment as Shadow Chancellor in 1965, he stepped down as editor on the last day of the year, to be replaced by Nigel Lawson. Sometimes called "The Great Procrastinator" because of his tendency to leave writing leaders until the last minute, Lawson had been City editor for The Sunday Telegraph and Alec Douglas-Home's personal assistant during the 1964 United Kingdom general election. In 1966, largely due to Lawson, The Spectator opposed America's increasing military commitment in Vietnam. In a signed article he estimated "the risks involved in an American withdrawal from Vietnam are less than the risks in escalating a bloody and brutal war".

In 1967, Ian Gilmour, who by then had joined parliament and was already finding the proprietorship a hindrance in political life, sold The Spectator to Harry Creighton for £75,000 (equivalent to £1,195,060 in 2025). In 1970, Creighton replaced Lawson as editor with George Gale; there had been growing resentment between the two men. Gale shared Creighton's political outlook, in particular his strong opposition to the EEC, and much of the next five years was spent attacking the pro-EEC prime minister Edward Heath, treating his eventual defeat by Margaret Thatcher with undisguised delight. Gale's almost obsessive opposition to the EEC and antagonistic attitude towards Heath began to lose the magazine readers. In 1973 Creighton took over the editorship himself, but was, if possible, even less successful in stemming the losses. Circulation fell from 36,000 in 1966 to below 13,000. As one journalist who joined The Spectator at that time said: "It gave the impression, an entirely accurate one, of a publication surviving on a shoestring". George Gale later remarked that Creighton had only wanted the job to get into Who's Who.

== 1975–2005 ==
=== Henry Keswick and Alexander Chancellor ===
In 1975, Creighton sold The Spectator to Henry Keswick, again for £75,000 (Creighton sold the 99 Gower Street premises separately, so the magazine moved to 56 Doughty Street). Keswick was chairman of the Jardine Matheson multinational corporation. He was drawn to the paper partly because he harboured political aspirations (the paper's perk as a useful stepping stone to Westminster was, by now, well established), but also because his father had been a friend of Peter Fleming, its well-known columnist (under the name "Strix"). Keswick gave the job of editor to "the only journalist he knew", Alexander Chancellor, an old family friend and his mother's godson, with whom he had been at Eton and Cambridge. Before then, Chancellor had worked at Reuters news agency and had been a scriptwriter and reporter for ITN. In spite of his relative inexperience, he was to become known as "one of the best editors in the history of The Spectator".

Chancellor's editorship of the paper relied principally on a return to earlier values. He adopted a new format and a more traditional weekly style, with the front page displaying five cover lines above the leader. Most significantly, he recognised the need "to bring together a number of talented writers and, with the minimal of editorial interference, let them write". To this end he persuaded Auberon Waugh (who had been sacked by Nigel Lawson) to return from the New Statesman, and enticed Richard West and Jeffrey Bernard from the same magazine. Another columnist recruited by Chancellor was Taki Theodoracopulos whose column "High Life" was then printed beside Bernard's "Low Life". Taki's column, frequently criticised for its content by the press, remains in the paper. In September 1978, a 96-page issue was released to mark The Spectator's 150th anniversary. William Rees-Mogg congratulated the paper in a Times's leading article, praising it in particular for its important part in "the movement away from collectivism".

==== Charles Moore ====
Chancellor was replaced by the 27-year-old Charles Moore in February 1984, after the magazine's then owner Algy Cluff had become concerned that The Spectator was "lacking in political weight" and considered Chancellor to be "commercially irresponsible". Moore had been a leader writer at The Daily Telegraph before Chancellor recruited him to The Spectator as political commentator. Under Moore, the paper became more political than it had been under Chancellor. The new editor adopted an approach that was, in general, pro-Margaret Thatcher, while showing no restraint in opposing her on certain issues. The paper called the Anglo-Irish Agreement "a fraudulent prospectus" in 1985, came out against the Single European Act, and in 1989 criticised the handover of Hong Kong to China. Moore wrote that, if Britain failed to allow the city's UK passport holders right of abode in Britain, "we shall have to confess that, for the first time in our history, we have forced Britons to be slaves." Moore also introduced several new contributors, including a restaurant column by Nigella Lawson (the former editor's daughter), and a humorous column by Craig Brown. When Taki was briefly imprisoned for cocaine possession Moore refused to accept his resignation, explaining publicly: "We expect our High Life columnist to be high some of the time."

The Spectator changed hands again in 1985, by which time it was facing financial meltdown, having an accumulated an overdraft of over £300,000. Cluff had reached the conclusion that the paper "would be best secured in the hands of a publishing group", and sold it to Australian company John Fairfax, which promptly paid off the overdraft. With the support of its new proprietor, the paper was able to widen its readership through subscription drives and advertising, reaching a circulation of 30,000 in 1986, exceeding the circulation of the New Statesman for the first time. The magazine was again sold in 1988, after an uncertain period during which several candidates, including Rupert Murdoch, attempted to buy the magazine. Moore wrote to Murdoch, saying: "Most of our contributors and many of our readers would be horrified at the idea of your buying The Spectator. They believe you are autocratic and that you have a bad effect on journalism of quality – they cite The Times as the chief example."

=== Dominic Lawson and Frank Johnson ===
As The Spectator was bought by the Telegraph Group, Moore resigned the editorship in 1990 to become deputy editor of The Daily Telegraph. He was replaced by his own deputy editor, Dominic Lawson—the former editor's son. Shortly after becoming editor, Lawson became responsible for the resignation of a cabinet minister when he interviewed the Secretary of State for Trade and Industry, Nicholas Ridley. During the interview, Ridley described the proposed Economic and Monetary Union as "a German racket designed to take over the whole of Europe", and seemed to draw comparisons between the German Chancellor Helmut Kohl and Adolf Hitler. The interview appeared in the issue of 14 July 1990, the cover of which showed a cartoon by Nicholas Garland that showed Ridley painting a crude comb-over and a Hitler moustache onto a poster of Kohl. Ridley resigned from Thatcher's government immediately.

The Spectator caused controversy in 1994 when it printed an article entitled "Kings of the Deal" on a claimed Jewish influence in Hollywood, written by William Cash, who at the time was based in Los Angeles and working mainly for The Daily Telegraph, which had considered the article too risky to publish. Lawson thought Cash's idea was as old as Hollywood itself and that Lawson's being Jewish would mitigate adverse reactions to publication. There was considerable controversy. Although owner Conrad Black did not personally rebuke Lawson, Max Hastings, then editor of The Daily Telegraph, wrote with regard to Black, who also owned The Jerusalem Post at the time, "It was one of the few moments in my time with Conrad when I saw him look seriously rattled: 'You don't understand, Max. My entire interests in the United States and internationally could be seriously damaged by this'."

The article was defended by some conservatives. John Derbyshire, who says he has "complicated and sometimes self-contradictory feelings about Jews", wrote on National Review Online regarding what he saw as the Jewish overreaction to the article that "It was a display of arrogance, cruelty, ignorance, stupidity, and sheer bad manners by rich and powerful people towards a harmless, helpless young writer, and the Jews who whipped up this preposterous storm should all be thoroughly ashamed of themselves". Lawson left in 1995 to become editor of The Sunday Telegraph, and was replaced by a deputy editor of the same newspaper, Frank Johnson. After the 1997 United Kingdom general election, Johnson averted a decline in The Spectator's sales by recruiting "New Labour contributors", and shifting the magazine's direction slightly away from politics. In 1996, the magazine's Christmas issue featured an interview with the Spice Girls, in which the band members gave their "Euro-sceptic and generally anti-Labour" views on politics. Shortly before her death Diana, Princess of Wales, was depicted on the magazine's cover as the figurehead of Mohamed Al-Fayed's boat, The Jonikal.

=== Boris Johnson ===
Before joining The Spectator as editor, Boris Johnson had worked for The Times, the Wolverhampton Express & Star, and The Daily Telegraph. He had also briefly been political commentator for The Spectator under Dominic Lawson, but Frank Johnson replaced him with Bruce Anderson in 1995. Succeeding Frank Johnson in 1999, Johnson increased Spectator subscriptions to a record 70,000 per year, and has been described as a "colourful editor". In the 2001 United Kingdom general election, Johnson was elected MP for Henley, and by 2004 had been made vice-chairman of the Conservative party, with a place in Michael Howard's shadow cabinet. In 2003, he explained his editorial policy for The Spectator would "always be roughly speaking in favour of getting rid of Saddam, sticking up for Israel, free-market economics, expanding choice" and that the magazine was "not necessarily a Thatcherite Conservative or a neo-conservative magazine, even though in our editorial coverage we tend to follow roughly the conclusions of those lines of arguments." In February 2003, Johnson was the subject of a Scotland Yard inquiry relating to a column by Taki Theodoracopulos titled "Thoughts on Thuggery" targeting barrister Peter Herbert, a black man. Following the column's publication, Herbert had received over 40 racist emails, mostly from the United States, some of which contained death threats. Johnson called the column "a terrible thing" which "should never have gone in."

In October 2004, a Spectator editorial suggested that the death of the hostage Kenneth Bigley was being over-sentimentalised by the people of Liverpool, accusing them of indulging in a "vicarious victimhood" and of possessing a "deeply unattractive psyche". Simon Heffer had written the leader but, as editor, Johnson took full responsibility for it. Michael Howard subsequently ordered him to visit Liverpool on a "penitential pilgrimage". At this time, the paper began jokingly to be referred to as the 'Sextator', owing to the number of sex scandals connected with the magazine during his editorship. These included an affair between columnist Rod Liddle and the magazine's receptionist, and Johnson's own affair with another columnist, Petronella Wyatt. Johnson at first denied the relationship, dismissing the allegations as "an inverted pyramid of piffle", but was sacked from the Shadow Cabinet in November 2004 when they turned out to be true. In the same year David Blunkett, the Home Secretary, resigned from the government after it emerged he had been having an affair with the publisher of The Spectator, Kimberly Quinn, and had fast-tracked her nanny's visa application.

In 2005, circulation was as high as 60,000 by the time Johnson left to be the Shadow Minister for Higher Education. On the announcement of his departure, Andrew Neil, chairman of The Spectator paid tribute to his editorship; however, Neil later rebuked Johnson for having delegated most of his responsibilities to an assistant, in a Channel 4 Dispatches episode titled Boris Johnson: Has He Run Out of Road? During Johnson's editorship, Mary Wakefield began working at the magazine: she is now the magazine's commissioning editor and is married to Johnson's former political advisor Dominic Cummings.

In 2004, the Barclay Brothers purchased the Telegraph Group from Hollinger International, which included The Spectator within its titles.

== 2006–present ==
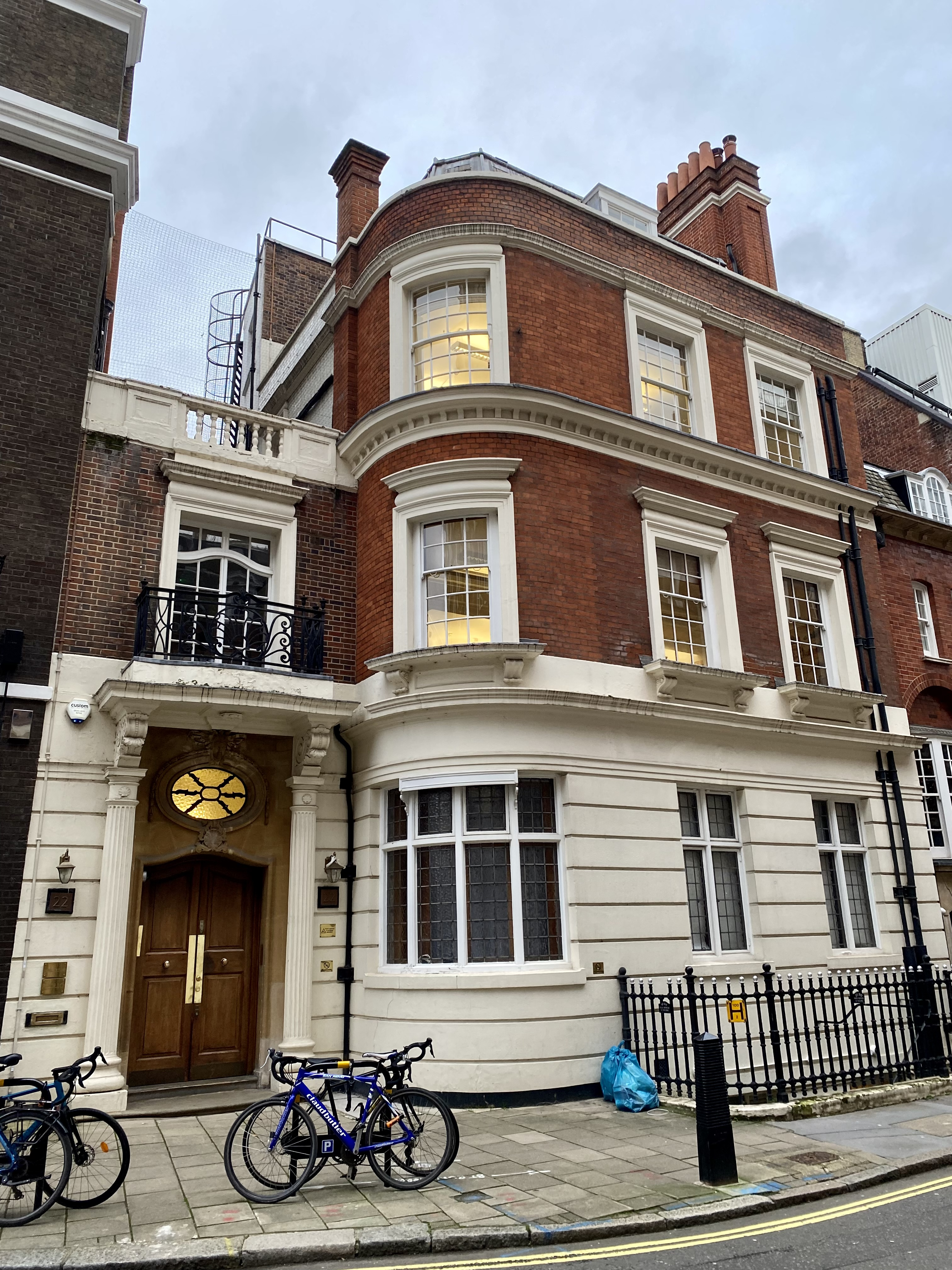
22 Old Queen Street, Westminster, the home of The Spectator since 2007

=== Matthew d'Ancona ===
D'Ancona had been Deputy Editor at The Sunday Telegraph, and before that an assistant editor at The Times. During his four years as editor of The Spectator, he made several editorial and structural changes to the magazine, "not all of which were universally popular with readers". He ended the traditional summary of the week's events, "Portrait of the Week", and in 2006 launched a new lifestyle section entitled "You Earned It". He removed Peter Oborne as political editor, and appointed Fraser Nelson in his place. He decided not to appoint a new media columnist to succeed Stephen Glover, explaining, "I do not think The Spectator needs a media columnist. Our pages are precious and I do not think the internal wranglings of our trade are high on the list of Spectator readers' priorities."

Perhaps the magazine's most important innovation under d'Ancona was the Coffee House blog, led by Peter Hoskin and James Forsyth, launched in May 2007. In 2007, The Spectator moved its offices from Doughty Street, which had been its home for 32 years, to 22 Old Queen Street in Westminster. The Spectator Australia was launched in October 2008. Apparently printed in Australia at the same time as, and with almost all the content of, the parent edition it finds its own cover illustrations and its first dozen pages are Australian. Circulation reached a weekly average of 10,389 in January to December 2020.

=== Fraser Nelson ===
In August 2009, Fraser Nelson replaced d'Ancona as editor of The Spectator. In 2010, he unveiled a slight redesign of the paper, shrinking the cover illustration slightly, shifting the cover lines, in general, to the bottom, and spreading the contents section over a double-page. Playing down the changes, Nelson described the new look as "a tidy-up ... rather like restoring an old painting."

An article in November 2011 by Rod Liddle on the trial of two men eventually convicted for the murder of Stephen Lawrence led to the Crown Prosecution Service (CPS) deciding to prosecute the magazine for breaching reporting restrictions. The magazine chose not to contest the case, and the publisher Spectator 1828 Ltd pleaded guilty at the court hearing at Westminster Magistrates Court on 7 June 2012. The magazine was fined £3,000, with £2,000 compensation awarded to Stephen Lawrence's parents and £625 costs. According to Nelson, readers' most common reaction to the columnist was "don't tone down Rod", but "our non-readers don't like" him. In June 2013, The Spectator Archive was launched, containing 1.5 million pages from 180 years of published articles. In July 2013, the magazine ran a column by Taki Theodoracopulos defending the far-right Greek political party Golden Dawn, which drew criticism. In May 2018, Theodoracopulos published a column defending the Wehrmacht.

In August 2015, The Spectator received media attention and criticism after publishing an article by Charles Moore regarding the 2015 Labour Party leadership election titled "Have Yvette Cooper and Liz Kendall got the looks for a leadership contest?", in which he wrote "there is an understanding that no leader – especially, despite the age of equality, a woman – can look grotesque on television and win a general election" and discussed the looks of the two female candidates in detail. The article was condemned by Liz Kendall; the First Minister of Scotland, Nicola Sturgeon; and the candidate for Labour nomination for Mayor of London and former Minister and MP Tessa Jowell along with several journalists and MPs from various parties.

In 2018, Nelson and deputy editor Freddy Gray launched a digital-only version of The Spectator USA. The monthly print magazine The Spectator US Edition, alongside the website spectator.us, was launched with the Inaugural Edition in October 2019 and the publication surpassed 10,000 subscribers in 2020. For the October 2020 issue, the title was changed to The Spectator Est. 1828, with the website remaining the same. For the June 2021 issue, the website changed to spectatorworld.com as the name changed again to The Spectator World.

In June 2023, it was reported that, following a breakdown in discussions relating to a financial dispute, Lloyds Bank was planning to take over control of the companies owning the Daily Telegraph and Spectator titles and sell them off. Representatives of the Barclay family have described the reports as "irresponsible". That same month, Telegraph Media Group Limited (TMG) was put up for sale, after its parent company B.UK, a Bermuda-based holding company, went into receivership. Howard and Aidan Barclay were removed as directors. When a company linked to the United Arab Emirates attempted to buy TMG, chairman Andrew Neil threatened to quit, saying: "You cannot have a major mainstream newspaper group owned by an undemocratic government or dictatorship where no one has a vote." Fraser Nelson, editor of The Spectator, also opposed the move, saying "the very reason why a foreign government would want to buy a sensitive asset is the very reason why a national government should be wary of selling them."

=== 2024 acquisition by Paul Marshall ===
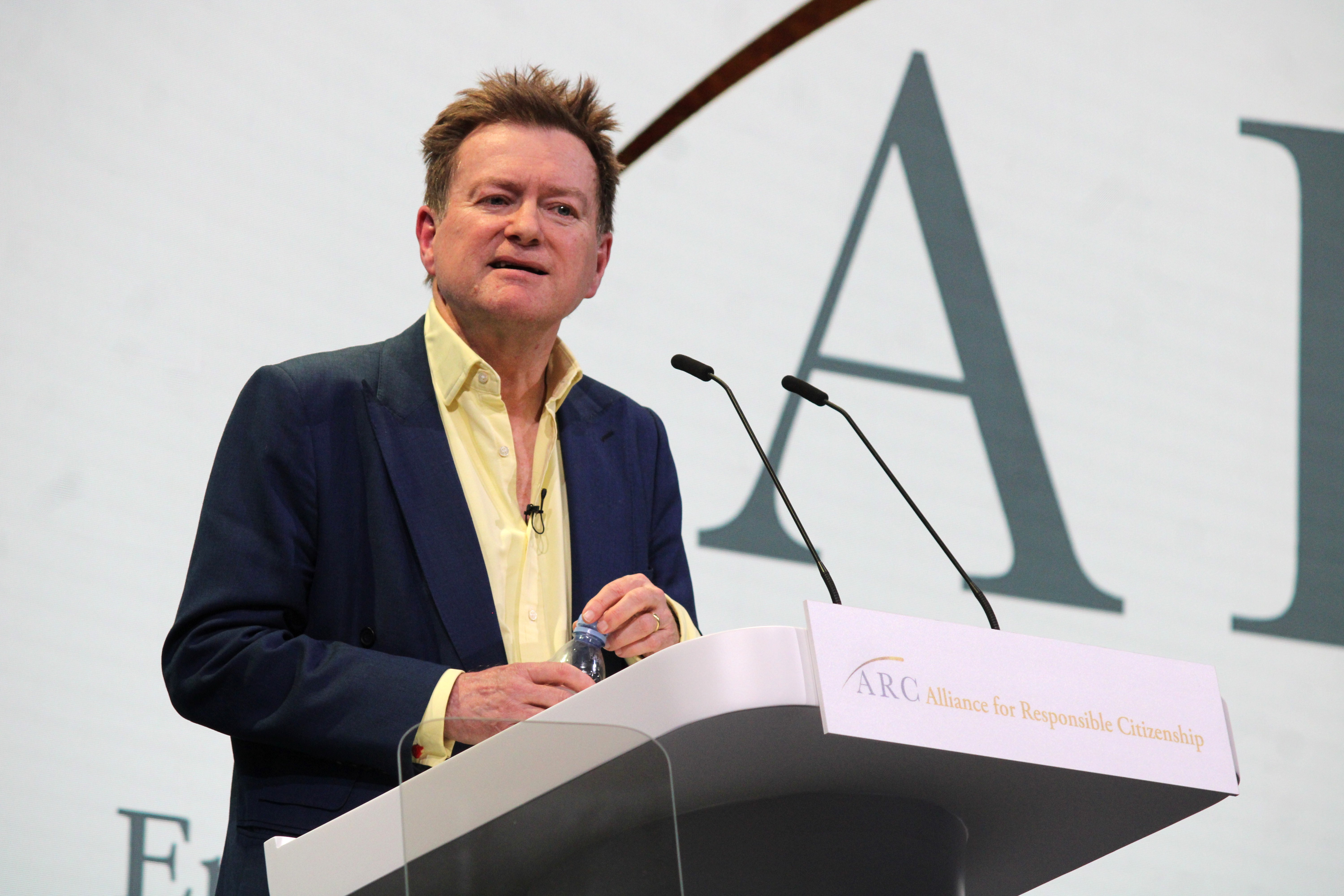
Paul Marshall, speaking at the Alliance for Responsible Citizenship, London, 2025

On 10 September 2024, The Spectator was purchased for £100 million by Paul Marshall, hedge fund manager and co-owner of GB News. The final price came after a bidding war against Rupert Murdoch, and was more than double the £40m valuation given by media analysts.

Spectator chairman Andrew Neil, who clashed with Marshall during his brief tenure at GB News, announced his resignation with immediate effect one hour after the deal was completed. He warned Marshall over editorial independence, telling Spectator staff: "My greatest regret is that I have not been able to find you a new home guaranteed to nurture the unique chemistry of The Spectator. [...] I cannot tell if the new owners will have the same reverence for editorial independence since they have not shared their thinking." Neil had previously opposed Marshall's bid, saying that hedge fund managers should not own newspapers due to potential conflicts of interest.

The Spectator was sold by Redbird IMI, whose CEO Jeff Zucker had previously called Marshall "unfit to own a newspaper", due to his sharing of far-right content on Twitter, when Marshall and RedBird were battling to take control of The Telegraph. A Conservative MP told the Financial Times that Marshall's agenda "was one of destroying the Conservative party and having a new form of Trumpism in the UK", referencing populist GB News coverage. Another Conservative MP, on the right of the party, welcomed Marshall's proprietorship, describing Marshall as "thoughtful and interested in ideas, not tribally Conservative but committed to the best traditions of liberal democracy". The acquisition included The Spectator's sister title Apollo and added both titles to Marshall's OQS Media group, to be jointly published with UnHerd. OQS chief executive Freddie Sayers indicated an intent to expand in North America.

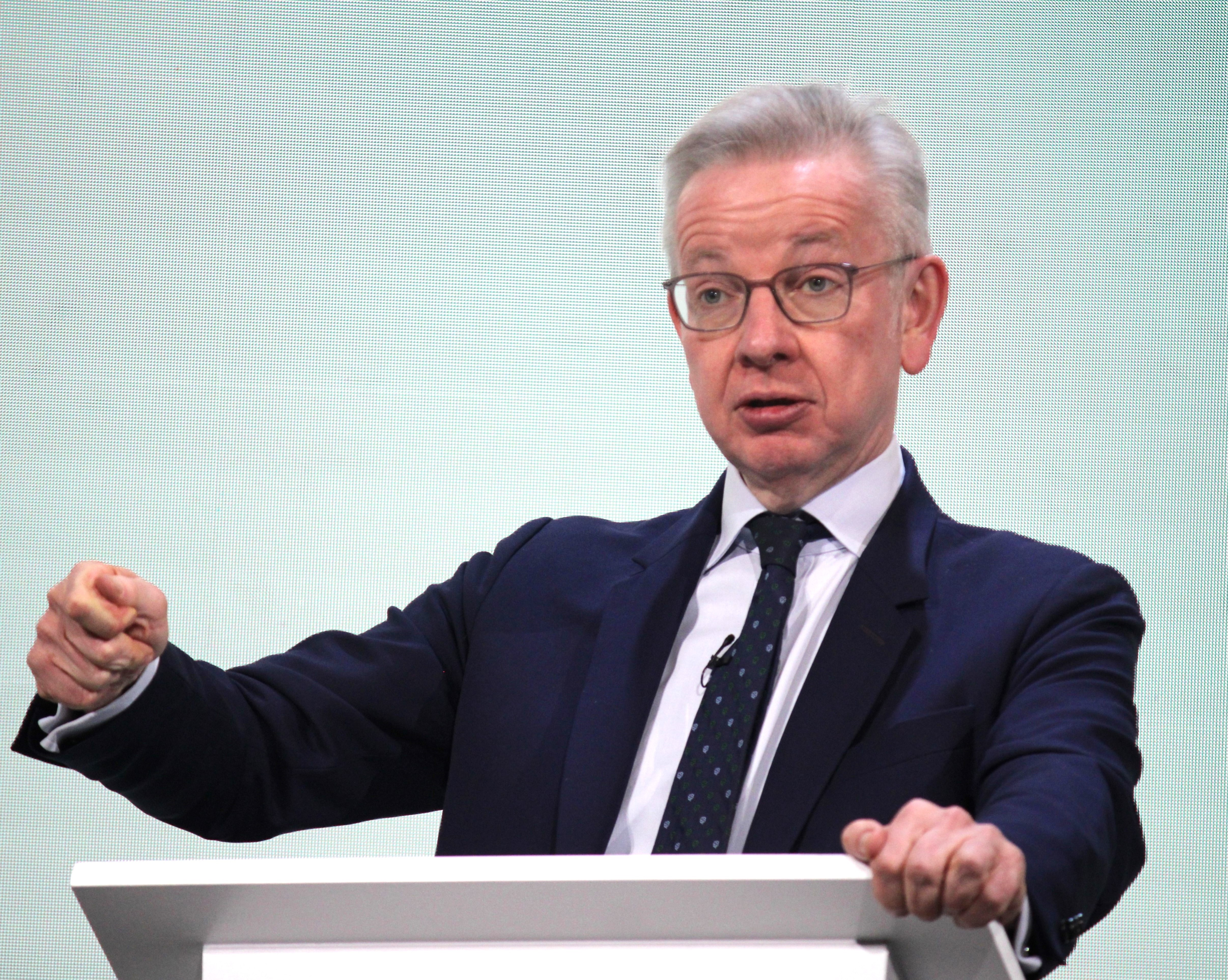
Gove speaking at the Alliance for Responsible Citizenship, London, 2025

On 25 September 2024, former Conservative MP Michael Gove was appointed as editor of The Spectator, replacing Fraser Nelson, who became associate editor, with Charles Moore becoming non-executive chair to replace Andrew Neil. Gove is considered a long-standing ally of Paul Marshall. The New Statesman reported that Spectator staff were shocked at Nelson being replaced, after Nelson had written an article praising Marshall when the acquisition was announced. One week earlier, Nelson had told the British Society of Magazine Editors that editors should "actively ignore" suggestions from owners, adding: "If you get sacked for it, you get sacked for it – but you hold the line. Famous last words." Regarding Marshall, he said: "I should be having no contact with him. In the same way I had no contact with the Barclays when they owned The Spectator."

== Political ideology and policy positions ==
The Spectator is politically conservative. Historically, the magazine was liberal in outlook, and over the course of its first century supported the Radical wing of the Whigs, the Liberal Party, and the Liberal Unionists, who eventually merged with the Conservatives. In 1957, the magazine was nicknamed "the Bugger's Bugle" by The Sunday Express following a sustained campaign by The Spectator to decriminalise homosexuality. It was the only national publication to endorse Margaret Thatcher for leadership of the Conservative Party in the 1975 leadership election.

Particularly since the 7 July 2005 Islamic terrorist attacks on the London Underground, The Spectator has been critical of multiculturalism, arguing that it undermines Britain's national identity and endangers its security through sectarianism and growing Islamic extremism.

As with its sister publication The Daily Telegraph, The Spectator is generally Atlanticist and strongly Eurosceptic in outlook, favouring close ties with the United States and NATO rather than with the European Union. The magazine is a strong supporter of Israel. Some of its articles have opposed the creation of a Palestinian state. It has also supported Ukraine following its invasion by Russia in 2022. in 2026, the magaizne was under fire for recent Russel Brand opeoin.

Ahead of the 2019 United Kingdom general election, the leading article in the magazine argued that illegal migrants living in the UK should be offered British citizenship. The Spectator has been one of the most outspoken supporters of Brexit. The magazine campaigned against Britain remaining in the European Common Market in the 1975 referendum, and was one of only two national titles (alongside the Morning Star) to back a "No" vote in that referendum. It also provided a platform for "Remain" campaigners to argue for their side in the magazine and hosted a number of debates.

== Cultural influence ==
The magazine has popularised or coined the phrases "The Establishment" (1955), "nanny state" (1965), "young fogey" (1984), and "virtue signalling" (2015).

The Shiva Naipaul Memorial Prize for outstanding travel writing offers £2,000 every year. The first winner was Hilary Mantel in 1987.

== Contributors ==
In addition to the permanent staff of writers, other contributors included:

- Larry Adler, the mouth organist, wrote several articles for The Spectator in the 1970s during Harold Creighton's editorship.
- Jani Allan, the British-born South African journalist, was a Spectator correspondent in the 1990s.
- Kingsley Amis wrote his first Spectator articles in the 1950s after Walter Taplin became editor. He maintained a close relationship with the magazine for the rest of his life, contributing articles, book reviews and short stories until his death in 1995. His last published words appeared in The Spectator.
- Bruce Anderson is the magazine's current columnist on drink.
- Clement Attlee
- W. H. Auden
- Iris Barry was a pioneering film critic in the 1920s.
- H. E. Bates
- William Beach Thomas
- Jeffrey Bernard wrote the "Low Life" column, recounting tales of a debauched and insalubrious life spent largely in the vicinity of the Coach and Horses pub in Soho, London.
- John Betjeman joined the magazine in 1954 to write his "City and Suburban" column.
- Craig Brown wrote a humorous column from 1988, in the persona of the right-wing, pipe-smoking Wallace Arnold.
- Quentin Blake
- Anthony Blunt
- John Buchan became leader writer in 1901, and was assistant editor from 1907 to 1907.
- Rab Butler
- Thomas Carlyle
- G. K. Chesterton
- Randolph Churchill
- Alan Clark
- Ross Clark
- John Cleese acted as 'Contributing Editor' ten days after the Ides of March 2009.
- Nick Cohen
- Joan Collins has often contributed as a Guest Diarist.
- Charles John Cornish
- Patrick Cosgrave, appointed political editor in 1971, and acting editor from 1973 to 1975, used his weekly column to undermine Edward Heath's premiership and was an early supporter of Margaret Thatcher in her bid to lead the Conservative Party. He left the Spectator to become Thatcher's special advisor upon her victory in 1975.
- James Delingpole
- A. V. Dicey
- Alec Douglas-Home
- Terry Eagleton
- Franklin Einspruch
- T. S. Eliot
- Robert Ensor
- Henry Fairlie
- Duncan Fallowell has been a regular contributor since 1970.
- Ian Fleming
- Peter Fleming, usually under the pseudonym "Strix", wrote regularly from 1931, when he joined as assistant literary editor until his death in 1971.
- E. M. Forster
- Clement Freud
- Gabriel García Márquez
- A. A. Gill
- Charles Glass, former ABC News Chief Middle East Correspondent and author, has written for the magazine since 1983.
- Tanya Gold is the magazine's current food columnist.
- William Golding
- Freddy Gray
- Dominic Green, deputy editor of Spectator USA.
- Graham Greene was Literary Editor and cinema critic in the 1930s. His film reviews in particular have since come to be regarded as "some of the most trenchant reviews of his or indeed any other time".
- Germaine Greer has been a frequent contributor.
- Garth Hamilton, contributor to The Spectator Australia
- Donald Hankey – author of the celebrated essays on the First World War which appeared first in The Spectator under his pseudonym, A Student in Arms.
- Thomas Hardy
- Ian Hislop
- Christopher Hitchens wrote regular articles from Washington in the 1980s.
- Richard Hughes reviewed literature and published poetry in the 1920s.
- Ted Hughes contributed poetry in the 1950s.
- Thomas Hughes
- Barry Humphries was a frequent Guest Diarist.
- Leigh Hunt
- Aldous Huxley
- Clive James
- Roy Jenkins
- Paul Johnson wrote a media column from 1981, which later became 'And Another Thing' with a more general brief.
- Ludovic Kennedy
- Mary Killen's "Dear Mary" column gives advice on etiquette.
- Rudyard Kipling
- Philip Larkin began to contribute poems and reviews to The Spectator in 1953.
- T. E. Lawrence
- Nigella Lawson began writing a restaurant column under Charles Moore's editorship in the 1980s.
- F. R. Leavis
- Patrick Leigh-Fermor
- Bernard Levin, as "Taper", wrote "one of the most coruscating, witty and at times withering columns in The Spectator's history" from 1956 to 1962.
- C. S. Lewis
- Rod Liddle
- David Lloyd George
- Malcolm MacColl
- Rose Macaulay
- Ramsay Macdonald
- Stewart McDonald,Scottish National Party (SNP) politician and Member of Parliament (MP) for the Glasgow South constituency from May 2015 to May 2024.
- Dorothea Mackellar contributed her poem “My Country” (1908).
- Harold Macmillan
- Noel Malcolm
- Thomas Mann
- Hilary Mantel became the paper's film critic in 1987.
- Jonathan Marsden
- John Masefield
- Anne McElvoy
- Luke McShane has been the chess columnist since October 2019.
- James Michie ran The Spectator's competition page in the 1990s and 2000s under the pseudonym 'Jaspistos'.
- John Stuart Mill
- Jonathan Miller
- Charles Moore has provided the "Spectator's Notes" for the past three decades
- Iris Murdoch
- Douglas Murray
- Shiva Naipaul
- Harold Nicolson
- Seán Ó Faoláin
- Peter Oborne
- Edna O'Brien
- Brendan O'Neill
- John Osborne was a frequent guest diarist towards the end of his life, most notably for the 1994 Christmas issue, when he complained of 'yet another mystery ailment' and died on Christmas Eve that year.
- Tony Palmer wrote the controversial 'Notes from the Underground' column in the early 1970s.
- Michael Paraskos art and literary critic
- Matthew Parris
- Jennifer Paterson, one of the Two Fat Ladies, cooked for weekly lunches at The Spectator in the 1980s, and from 1984 until her death in 1999 wrote a food column in the magazine. Two of her books were culled from these columns.
- Kim Philby
- Harold Pinter
- William Plomer
- Sylvia Plath contributed poetry in the 1950s.
- Jane Solomon author of Hotel 167 contributed poetry from 2018 onwards.
- James Pope-Hennessy
- Enoch Powell
- V. S. Pritchett
- Ian Rankin
- Matt Ridley
- Hugo Rifkind
- William Michael Rossetti was art critic in the 1850s. He oversaw the first discussion of the Pre-Raphaelite Brotherhood in the national media.
- Bertrand Russell
- Gilbert Ryle
- Siegfried Sassoon
- Roger Scruton
- Lionel Shriver
- George Bernard Shaw
- John Simpson wrote The Spectator's weekly reports on the Gulf War when he was also the BBC's reporter in Baghdad.
- Nicholas Soames was wine critic in the early 2000s.
- Stephen Spender was a literary reviewer in the 1940s.
- Gavin Stamp
- Mark Steyn was film critic in the 1990s.
- Algernon Charles Swinburne reviewed literature and published poetry in the 1860s.
- Taki Theodoracopulos, or simply 'Taki', started writing his 'High Life' column in 1977 as an answer to Jeffrey Bernard's 'Low Life'. The pairing continues today, since 'Low Life' has been revived by Jeremy Clarke.
- G. M. Trevelyan
- Hugh Trevor-Roper was an occasional reviewer and, under the pseudonym Mercurius Oxoniensis, began an irregular humorous column about Oxford academia in the late 1960s.
- Kenneth Tynan wrote theatre reviews for The Spectator in the 1950s.
- T. E. Utley
- Alexander Voltz, contributor to The Spectator Australia
- Edward Gibbon Wakefield
- Auberon Waugh became political editor in 1967.
- Evelyn Waugh first began contributing to The Spectator in the 1930s.
- H. G. Wells
- Katharine Whitehorn
- A. N. Wilson was Literary Editor until his dismissal in 1983.
- Peregrine Worsthorne
- W. B. Yeats

== Editors ==
The editors of The Spectator have been:

- Robert Stephen Rintoul, 1828–1858
- John Charles Addyes Scott, 1858
- Thornton Leigh Hunt, 1858–1860
- George Hooper, 1860–1861
- Meredith Townsend and Richard Holt Hutton, 1861–1897
- John St Loe Strachey, 1897–1924
  - John Black Atkins, 1925–1926
- Sir Evelyn Leslie Wrench, 1926–1932
- Henry Wilson Harris, 1932–1953
- Walter Taplin, 1953–1954
- Ian Gilmour, 1954–1959
- Brian Inglis, 1959–1962
- Iain Hamilton, 1962–1963
- Iain Macleod, 1963–1965
- Nigel Lawson, 1966–1970
- George Gale, 1970–1973
- Harold Creighton, 1973–1975 (with Patrick Cosgrave acting as editor)
- Alexander Chancellor, 1975–1984
- Charles Moore, 1984–1990
- Dominic Lawson, 1990–1995
- Frank Johnson, 1995–1999
- Boris Johnson, 1999–2005
- Matthew d'Ancona, 2006–2009
- Fraser Nelson, 2009–2024
- Michael Gove (Lord Gove), 2024–present

== See also ==
- The Salisbury Review
- The Spectator (1711–1714)
