= Iain Hamilton (journalist) =

Scottish journalist, author and poet

Iain Bertram Hamilton (3 February 1920 – 15 July 1986) was a Scottish journalist, author and poet.

Hamilton was educated at Paisley Grammar School, and initially worked as a reporter on the Daily Record in Glasgow before heading south to London to work on the staff of The Guardian. From 1952, he was associated with the weekly journal The Spectator, and after several promotions through the ranks he was appointed Editor in 1962, staying in that position for a year. He was editorial director of the Hutchinson group of publishing companies from 1958 to 1962, and after leaving The Spectator became managing director of Kern House Enterprises (1970–5). He was Director of Studies at the Institute for the Study of Conflict, London, during 1975–1977. In addition, he wrote a good many articles for the Illustrated London News and the high-brow current affairs magazine Encounter.

The best known of Hamilton's literary works is his biography of Arthur Koestler, published by Secker & Warburg, London, in 1982 (a year before Koestler's death). His other books were:

- Spectrum: A Spectator Miscellany (1956), ed. with Ian Gilmour
- Scotland the Brave (1957)
- Half a Highlander: An Autobiography of a Scottish Youth (1958)
- The Foster Gang (1966), with H. J. May
- Embarkation for Cythera (1974)
- The Kerry Kyle (1980)

He also wrote a play early in his career, The Snarling Beggar (1951).

== Reviews ==
- Ross, Robert (1982), review of Koestler, in Hearn, Sheila G. (ed.), Cencrastus No. 10, Autumn 1982, p. 48, ISSN 0264-0856
