= George Gale (journalist) =

British journalist and editor

George Stafford Gale (22 October 1927 – 3 November 1990) was a British journalist who was editor of the British political magazine The Spectator from 1970 to 1973.

== Life ==
The son of George Pyatt Gale, a clerk in the National Insurance Audit Department and second lieutenant in the Royal Northumberland Fusiliers during World War I, and Annie Watson (née Wood), Gale was descended from the Gale family of Scruton Hall, Yorkshire; he was raised a Presbyterian. Gale was educated at the independent Royal Grammar School, Newcastle, and Peterhouse, Cambridge, where he graduated with a double-first in history. He also studied at the University of Göttingen, retaining an interest in German philosophy throughout his life.

In 1951 Gale joined the Manchester Guardian as a leader writer and reporter on Labour Affairs. On assignment in 1954 to cover the British Labour Party Delegation on its visit to China, he logged his own critical impressions of the emerging bureaucratic style under Mao Zedong's post-revolution regime. These observations would become the basis for his 1955 book, No Flies In China.

In 1955 Gale moved to the Daily Express where he remained until 1967 (he returned there 1976–86) when he joined the Daily Mirror for three years until he took up the position at The Spectator.

His time at The Spectator is best remembered for his support of Enoch Powell and his appointment of Peter Ackroyd as its literary critic. After Auberon Waugh changed Gale's name in the published list of contributors to "Lunchtime O'Gale" ("Lunchtime O'Booze" was the Private Eye term for the archetypal drunken journalist), Waugh was sacked from The Spectator by its then editor Nigel Lawson. Gale, ironically, invited Waugh back after he had become editor.

He also enjoyed a long stint as a columnist on the Daily Express and in the mid-1980s was a regular panellist on the revived version of television's What's My Line. Gale's fondness for alcohol was also reflected in Private Eye's habit of referring to him as "George G. Ale".

In 1987 Gale called for the recriminalisation of homosexual relations, stating: "Aids should be made a notifiable disease and buggery, almost certainly the main way of transmitting it, should once more become a criminal offence.” This was in the context of the then rampant AIDS epidemic.

Gale also presented a morning phone-in programme from 1973 until about 1976 for LBC, a commercial radio station in London.

In 1951 Gale married his first wife, Patricia, daughter of cable manufacturer Charles Francis Holley and later the wife of the historian Maurice Cowling. There were four sons of their 32-year marriage. His second wife was Mary Dillon-Malone, formerly film critic at the Daily Mirror.

Media offices
Preceded by Nigel Lawson	Editor of The Spectator; 1970–1973	Succeeded by Harold Creighton
