= Harold Creighton =

British businessman

Harold Digby Fitzgerald Creighton
- Born: 11 September 1927
- Died: 3 June 2003 (aged 75)
- Occupations: Industrialist, magazine proprietor
- Known for: Proprietor and editor of The Spectator
- Spouse: Harriet Wallace
- Children: Four
- Military career
- Allegiance: United Kingdom
- Branch: British Army
- Rank: 2nd lieutenant
- Unit: Royal Armoured Corps

Harold Digby Fitzgerald Creighton (11 September 1927 – 3 July 2003) was a British businessman and machine tool pioneer, who bought The Spectator magazine in 1967 for £75,000.

In 1947, he was commissioned as a 2nd lieutenant in the Royal Armoured Corps and served in Egypt and the Far East. After completing his National Service, he joined a tin-smelting business in Malaya (now known as Malaysia) and returned to Britain, where he eventually became Chairman of the Scottish Machine Tool Corporation of Glasgow.

In 1967, bought The Spectator, a politically conservative, weekly magazine. In 1973, he took over as editor although he had no prior experience as a journalist, after sacking the incumbent editor, George Gale. He edited the magazine until 1975, when he sold it for £75,000 to Henry Keswick. During his tenure, the magazine fervently opposed British entry into the European Economic Community.

== Education ==
Creighton was educated at Haileybury and Imperial Service College, an independent school for boys (now co-educational), at Hertford Heath, near to the county town of Hertford in Hertfordshire.

Media offices
Preceded by George Gale	Editor of The Spectator; 1973 – 1975	Succeeded by Alexander Chancellor
