= Thornton Leigh Hunt =

First editor of The Daily Telegraph

- Born: 10 September 1810; Hampstead, London, England
- Died: 25 June 1873 (aged 62); Kilburn, London, England
- Burial place: Kensal Green Cemetery
- Occupations: Journalist and editor
- Employer(s): The Daily Telegraph; The Spectator
- Political party: Liberal
- Spouse: Katharine Gliddon (m. 1834–1873)
- Partner: Agnes Jervis Lewes
- Children: 14
- Family: Leigh Hunt (father); Marianne Hunt (mother)

Thornton Leigh Hunt (10 September 1810 – 25 June 1873) was the first editor of the British daily broadsheet newspaper The Daily Telegraph.

== Early life ==
Hunt was the son of the writer Leigh Hunt and his wife Marianne, née Kent. As a child he lived in Hampstead until the age of twelve, when his father moved the family to Italy for three years in order to edit The Liberal. Though he aspired to become a painter, an allergy to the pigments he was using thwarted Hunt's ambitions, though he did provide eight woodcuts to illustrate his father's poem 'Captain Sword and Captain Pen'.

== Journalist ==
Hunt took up a career in journalism. He was employed as a sub-editor for the Radical publication The Constitutional from 1837 until 1838, where he worked alongside William Makepeace Thackeray and Douglas Jerrold. In 1838 he went north where he worked as an editor for first the Cheshire Reformer, then the Glasgow Argus. He returned to London in 1840, where for the next several years he contributed to a variety of periodicals, co-founded The Leader with George Henry Lewes, and wrote a novel, The Foster-Brother: A tale of the War of Chiozza (1845).

In 1855, he was asked by Joseph Moses Levy to co-edit The Daily Telegraph with his son Edward Levy-Lawson. Hunt accepted and despite the initial arrangement he soon emerged for all practical purposes as the editor of the paper, a position he held until his death.

=== Political movements ===
A Liberal, Hunt was cultivated by Lord Palmerston, and developed a close relationship to William Ewart Gladstone, serving as his journalistic amanuensis during much of the 1860s. The two men corresponded on a variety of political issues, and were in close contact during the Reform Bill crisis in the 1860s.

Hunt was also editor of The Spectator from around 1859 to January 1861. James Buchanan was at that time President of the United States and was attempting to counter civil war over the issue of slavery, mostly by adopting a vacillatory position. Two Americans based in London - a businessman called John McHenry and an Assistant Secretary to ambassador George M. Dallas, called Benjamin Moran - determined to use the magazine as a counter to the generally anti-Buchanan position of the British press. Hunt had assisted Robert Stephen Rintoul at The Spectator and appears to have stayed on after Rintoul's death in April 1858. A short period under ownership by another person preceded the American purchase around December 1858. The nationality of those behind the purchase was disguised by dint of the co-financiers using Hunt as an intermediary, and he was installed as editor. The American owners dramatically altered the tone of the magazine, its circulation declined substantially and there were several occasions when Moran had to pump additional funds into the venture. Having paid £4200 for it, they sold for £2000 in January 1861; soon afterward, Abraham Lincoln had taken over from Buchanan.

Throughout his life Hunt was often associated with liberal political movements. He was a charter member of the Association for the Promotion of the Repeal of the Taxes on Knowledge and campaigned with the Chartists and the People's International League. Hunt also engaged in unorthodox social arrangements such as communal living in a phalanstère.

== Personal life ==
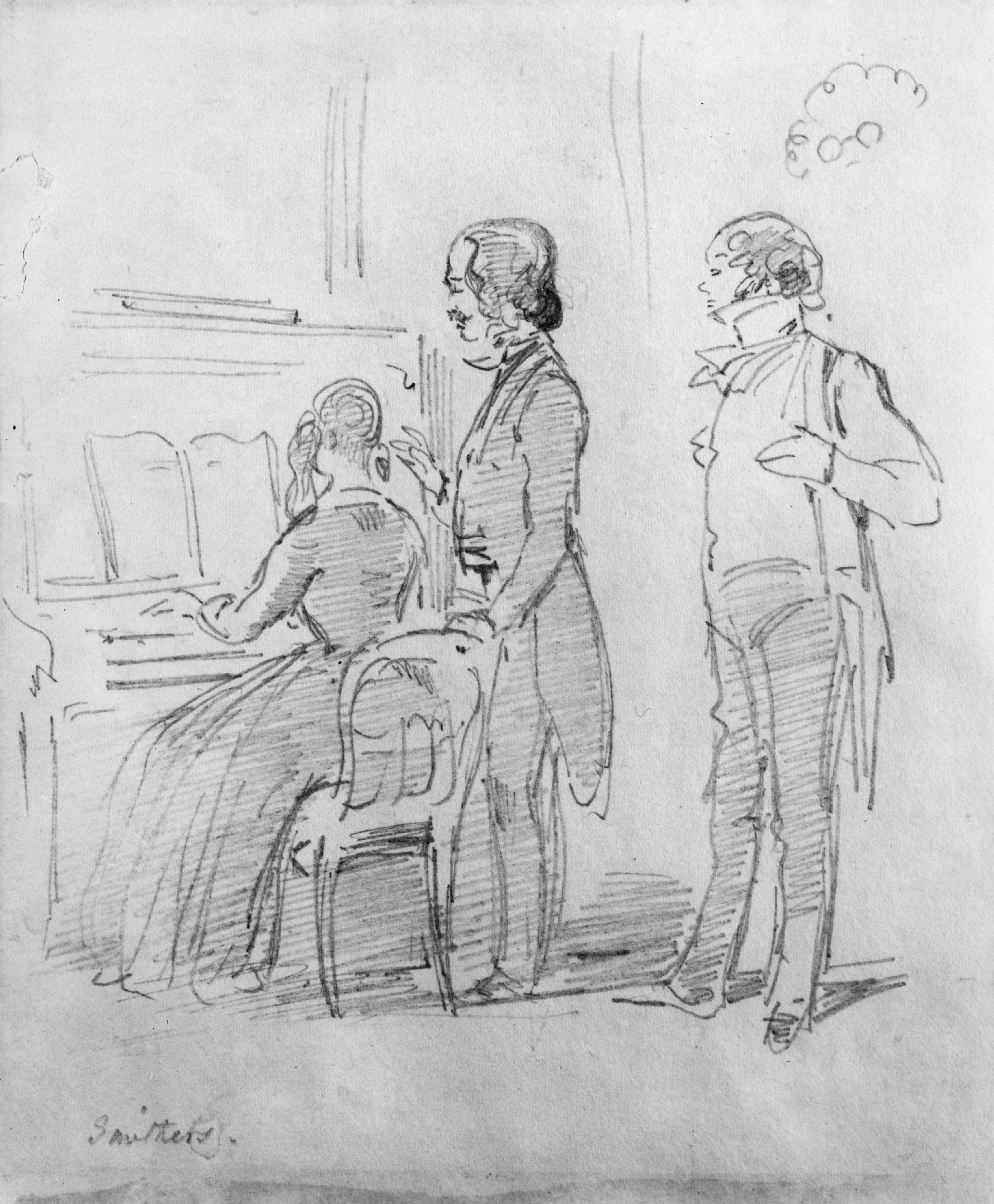
William Makepeace Thackeray, Mr and Mrs George Henry Lewes with Thornton Leigh Hunt, date unknown, National Portrait Gallery, London

Hunt married Katherine Gliddon in 1834 and they remained together until his death. They lived a communal, apparently free love, lifestyle in Bayswater with two other married couples. One couple was Kate's brother and Hunt's sister. The other couple was Kate's cousin (or adopted sister, Anastasia Gliddon), and Samuel Laurence, a painter. Single women, who were probably related to the residents, lived in the house, too.

Hunt became the lover of Agnes Jervis Lewes, the wife of his collaborator George Henry Lewes on The Leader, and fathered four children with her.

Hunt died in Kilburn, London on 25 June 1873. He is buried in Kensal Green Cemetery next to his father.

Media offices
Preceded by New position	Editor of The Daily Telegraph; 1855–1873	Succeeded by Edwin Arnold
