= Bruce Anderson (columnist) =

British political columnist (born 1949)

Bruce Anderson (born 1949) is a British political columnist, currently working as a freelancer. Formerly a political editor at The Spectator and contributor to the Daily Mail, he wrote for The Independent from 2003 to September 2010, and ConservativeHome until 2012.

== Early life and education ==
Anderson was born in Orkney, and was educated at Campbell College, Belfast, and Emmanuel College, Cambridge, where he read history. He was a contemporary of the historian Paul Bew at both school and university.

== Politics ==
In his youth he was a Marxist, and it was as a member of the radical organization People's Democracy (alongside Bew) that he first became involved in the civil rights campaign in Northern Ireland. Anderson participated in the most "dramatic moment in the story of People's Democracy": a four-day 'freedom walk' from Belfast to Derry, which began on New Year's Day 1969. On 4 January he and his fellow marchers were attacked by approximately 200 loyalists at Burntollet Bridge, just outside Derry.

He still writes regularly for The Spectator, where his contributions are distinguished by their unstinting support for Britain's former Prime Minister David Cameron, whom he identified as a future Conservative Party leader in 2003. Following the outcome of the referendum on Britain's membership of the European Union in June 2016, Anderson commented that:

It is the sovereign people who have got everything catastrophically wrong. I would not be surprised if there is a surge in demand to recall David Cameron, in months rather than years. Not so much 'Come back, all is forgiven' as 'Come back, and forgive us.'
