= Benjamin Moran =

American diplomat

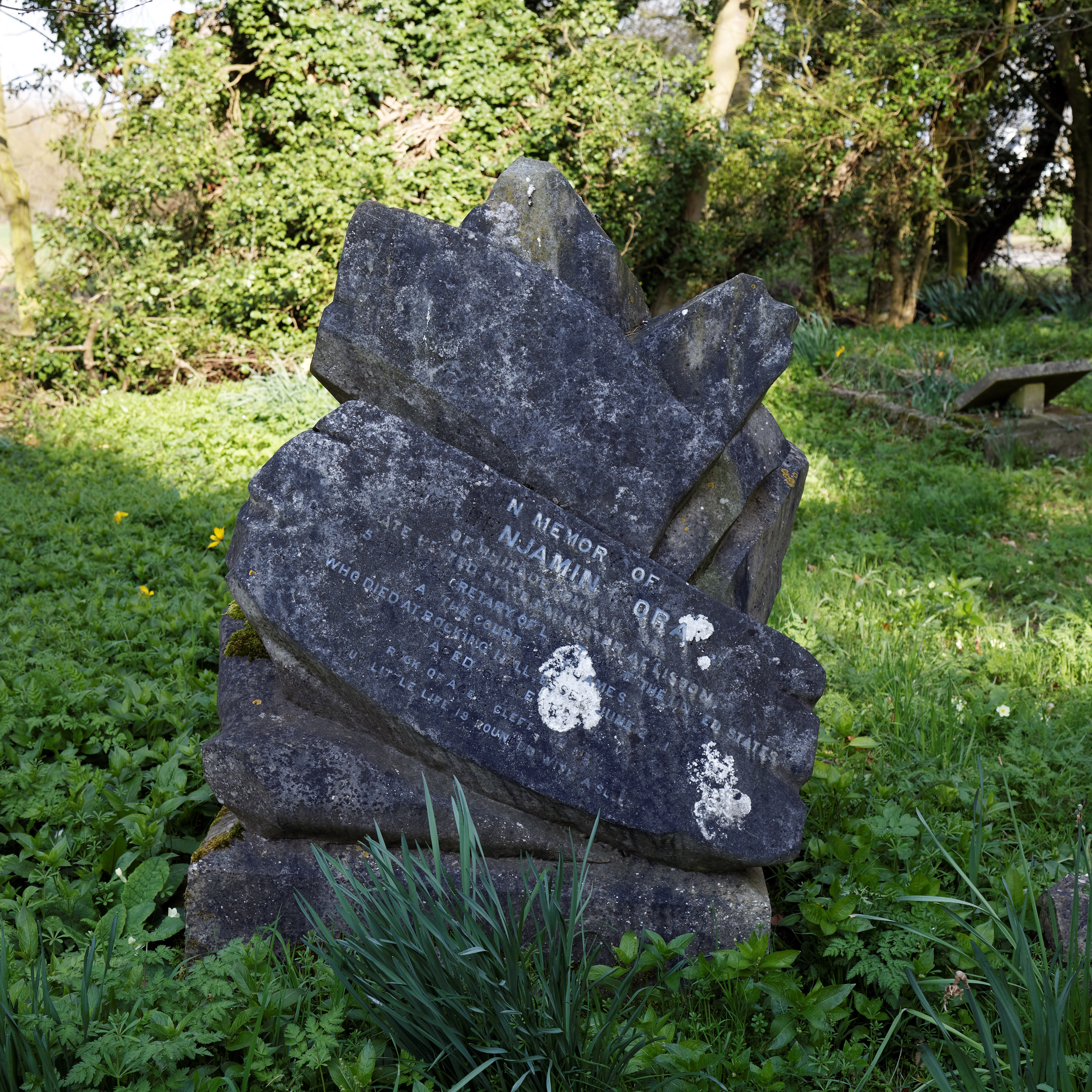
Benjamin Moran's grave at St Mary and St Christopher's Church, Panfield, Essex.

Benjamin Moran (b. Franklin County, Pennsylvania, 1820 – d. Braintree, Essex, on 20 June 1886) was an American diplomat who worked at the United States Legation (later the US Embassy) in London from 1853 to 1874.

Moran first visited England in 1851. In 1853, around the time that James Buchanan, who was from the same county in Pennsylvania as Moran, became US ambassador in London, Moran returned to England, becoming a temporary clerk at the legation. In 1854, he gained a permanent post and, in 1857, he was appointed Assistant Secretary, a post he kept until 1864, when he was promoted to Secretary, serving until 1875. From 1857, he kept a private diary which was subsequently published; the diary is of interest mainly because it documents how the US Civil War was seen in the UK.

Buchanan was elected president and George M. Dallas became Ambassador in London, where Moran stayed. From the end of 1858, Moran was co-owner of the London-based Spectator magazine, which he used to promote Buchanan's views against a generally hostile, anti-slavery British press. His co-owner was John McHenry, an American businessman who was also based in London, and they arranged the purchase through a nominee, Thornton Leigh Hunt, to disguise their connection. They dramatically altered the tone of the magazine, its circulation declined substantially and there were several occasions when Moran had to pump additional funds into the venture. Having paid £4200 for it, they sold for £2000 in January 1861, by which time Abraham Lincoln had taken over from the vacillating Buchanan.

In 1875, he was made Minister Resident to Portugal and, since this was the first instance of this kind of promotion in US diplomatic history, some regard him as the first American career diplomat. When the office of Minister Resident was discontinued in 1876, Moran was made Chargé d'Affaires at Lisbon, serving until 1882 when ill health forced him to resign and return to England. He never went back to the US, settling, instead, at Braintree in Essex, where he died at nearby Bocking Hall.
