= Walter Taplin =

Walter Taplin (1910–1986) was editor of The Spectator between 1953 and 1954.

== Life ==
Taplin was born and educated in Southampton. He graduated at the University of Oxford and went straight into journalism. He also took the degree of Bachelor of Commerce at the University of London.

Taplin was on the staff of The Economist in 1939–40. He then worked during World War II in the Ministry of Food and Central Statistical Office. From 1946, he was on the staff of The Spectator. He also wrote much for the Information Research Department. In 1955, he had a temporary position at the BBC as a Talks Producer, then moved to the Iron and Steel Board, working as an economist to 1956. From 1957 to 1961, he was a Research Fellow of the London School of Economics, studying advertising. He then edited Accountancy (1961 to 1971) and Accounting and Business Research (1971 to 1975).

== Bibliography ==
- Advertising: A New Approach (1960)
- History of the British Steel Industry (1962)

Preceded by Wilson Harris	Editor of The Spectator; 1953 - 1954	Succeeded by Ian Gilmour
