= Mary-Ellen B. Taplin =

American research oncologist

Mary-Ellen Taplin
- Born: 1960 (age 65–66)
- Education: University of Massachusetts, Worcester
- Occupations: Institute Physician and Director of Clinical Research for the Lank Center for Genitourinary Oncology
- Medical career
- Sub-specialties: Oncology

Mary-Ellen Taplin (born 1960), is a research oncologist at Dana Farber Cancer Institute and Brigham and Women's Hospital in Harvard's Longwood Medical and Academic Area.

Taplin is Institute Physician and Director of Clinical Research for the Lank Center for Genitourinary Oncology at Dana Farber Cancer Institute and at the Brigham and Women's Hospital’s Cancer Center. At the Harvard Medical School, also in the Longwood Medical Area, she is Professor of Medicine. She has been an investigator on many projects, including the Prostate Cancer Clinical Trial Consortium, Dana-Farber SPORE grant, Stand Up 2 Cancer, and several Prostate Cancer Foundation Challenge Grants.

At the Dana–Farber Cancer Institute, she chairs the Executive Committee for Clinical Research, and is Director of Clinical Research at the Lank Center for Genitourinary Oncology.

== Career ==
Taplin received her MD in 1986 from the University of Massachusetts Medical School. She completed a residency in internal medicine and chief residency at the University of Massachusetts Medical Center and an oncology-hematology fellowship at Beth Israel Hospital and Harvard Medical School in the Longwood Medical and Academic Area of Boston.

Taplin was on staff in medical oncology-hematology, first as an assistant and then associate professor of medicine at the University of Massachusetts from 1993 to 2003, when she joined Dana–Farber Cancer Institute.

=== Education ===
- Mount Holyoke College, 1982 (biochemistry)
- University of Massachusetts Medical School
- University of Massachusetts Medical Center, Chief Medical Resident
- University of Massachusetts Medical Center, Internal Medicine
- Beth Israel Deaconess Medical Center, Hematology/Oncology

== Personal life ==
Taplin's husband, whom she had met during their years in medical school, died from a brain tumor in 2005. Their medical residencies were in the same city, and their first daughter was born during that time. She lives with their two daughters in Boston.
