= John Ferguson Taplin =

John Ferguson Taplin (May 26, 1914 – April 10, 2008) was an American inventor and businessman and repeated donor to Harvard Medical School.

He was married to Virginia Baldwin Taplin (1919?-July 5, 2016), and their gifts were occasionally given in both names.

== Personal life ==
Taplin was one of five children born in Wellesley, Massachusetts to Harry Blake Taplin and Helen Hood Taplin. His brother Gardner B Taplin was the author of "The life of Elizabeth Barrett Browning" His sister, Jeannette Taplin Allison, lived in Wellesley, Massachusetts, United States, and his brother, Franklin Taplin, lived in South Hadley, Massachusetts Another brother died at a young age.

Soon after his graduation, Taplin married Virginia Baldwin. The couple had five children. At his death in 2008, they had been married for 69 years. In 2016, Virginia Taplin died at age 97 after a life of voluntary community service and active charity.

== Professional life ==
Taplin studied engineering at the Massachusetts Institute of Technology.

During his career as an engineer, Taplin invented devices for controlling cabin pressures in jet aircraft, speed controls for aircraft engines, and leak-free piston seals to reduce air pollution from vehicles.
