= George Henry Lewes =

British philosopher (1817–1878)

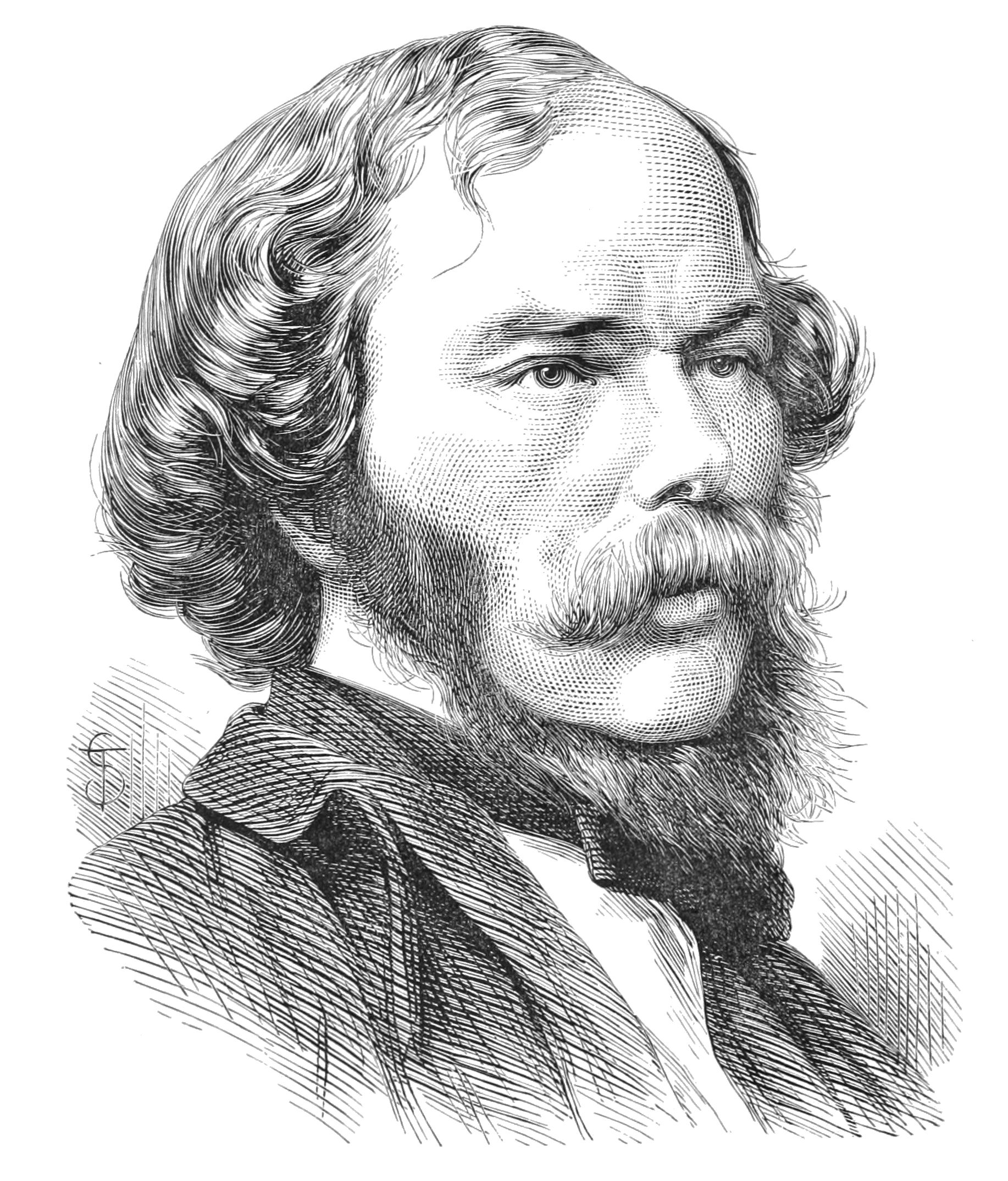
- Born: 18 April 1817; London, England
- Died: 30 November 1878 (aged 61); London, England
- Resting place: Highgate Cemetery
- Occupations: Philosopher, critic
- Spouse: Agnes Jervis (m. 1841; sep. 1854)
- Partner: George Eliot (1854–1878)

Philosophical work
- Era: Modern philosophy: 19th-century philosophy
- Region: Western philosophy: British philosophy
- School: Positivism

George Henry Lewes (/ˈluːɪs/; 18 April 1817 – 30 November 1878) was an English philosopher and critic of literature and theatre. He was also an amateur physiologist. American feminist Margaret Fuller called Lewes a "witty, French, flippant sort of man". He became part of the mid-Victorian ferment of ideas which encouraged discussion of Darwinism, positivism, and religious skepticism. However, he is perhaps best known today for having openly lived with Mary Ann Evans, who wrote under the pen name George Eliot, as soulmates whose lives and writings were enriched by their relationship, though they never married each other.

== Personal life ==
=== Early life ===
Lewes, born in London, was the illegitimate son of the minor poet John Lee Lewes and Elizabeth Ashweek, and the grandson of comic actor Charles Lee Lewes. His mother married a retired sea captain when he was six. Frequent changes of home meant he was educated in London, Jersey, and Brittany and finally at Dr Charles Burney's school in Greenwich. Having abandoned successively a commercial and a medical career, he seriously thought of becoming an actor and appeared several times on stage between 1841 and 1850. Finally he devoted himself to literature, science and philosophy.

As early as 1836, he belonged to a club formed for the study of philosophy, and had sketched out a physiological treatment of the philosophy of the Scottish school. Two years later he went to Germany, probably with the intention of studying philosophy.

Lewes undertook studies on nutrition and physiology; he explored the question whether sugar was injurious to teeth. He conducted experiments on the reflexes and the nervous system of living animals, especially frogs, using ether and chloroform out of consideration for their pain.

He became friends with Leigh Hunt, and through him he entered London Literary Society and met John Stuart Mill, Thomas Carlyle and Charles Dickens.

=== Marriage to Agnes Jervis ===
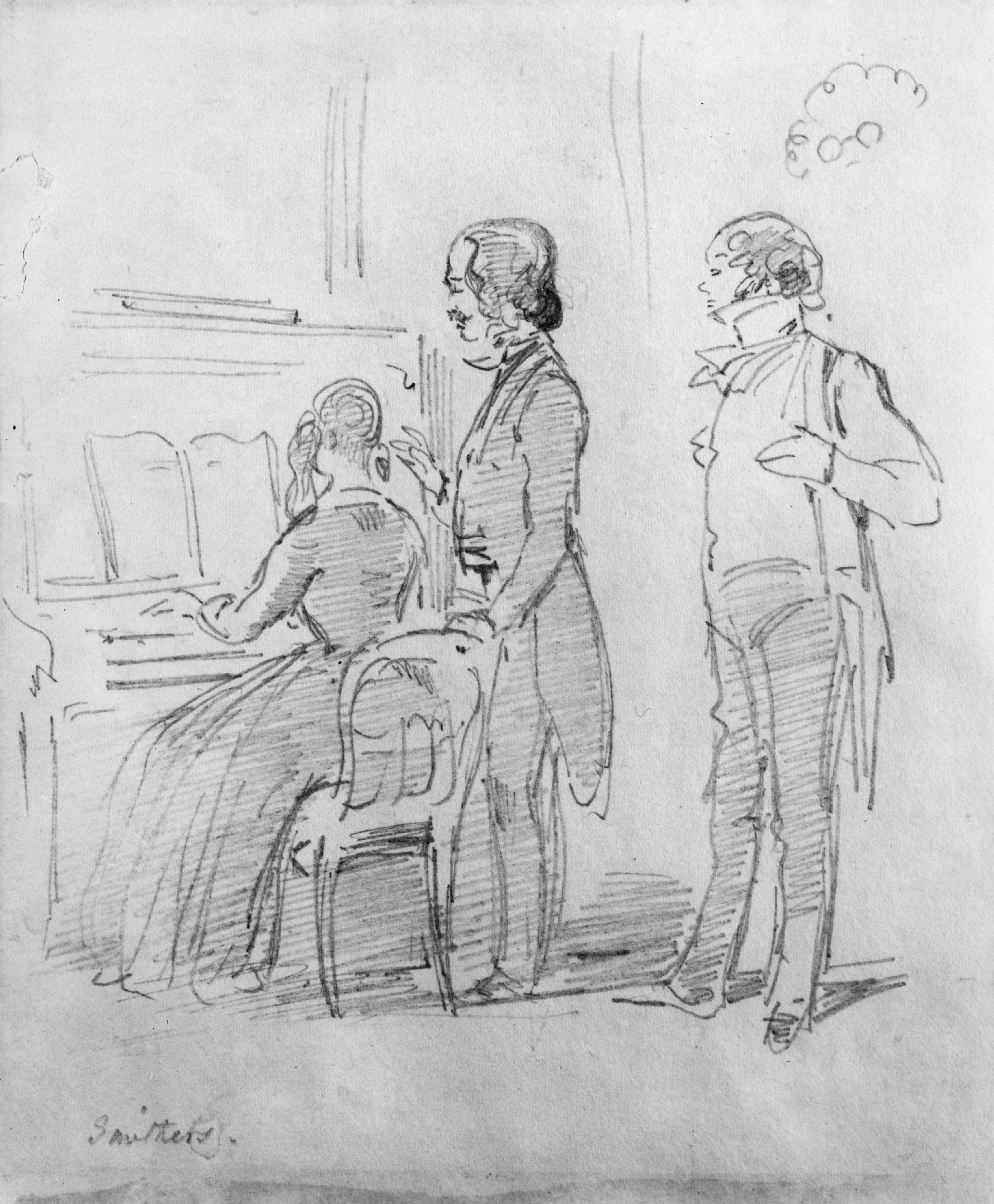
William Makepeace Thackeray, Mr and Mrs George Henry Lewes with Thornton Leigh Hunt, date unknown, National Portrait Gallery, London

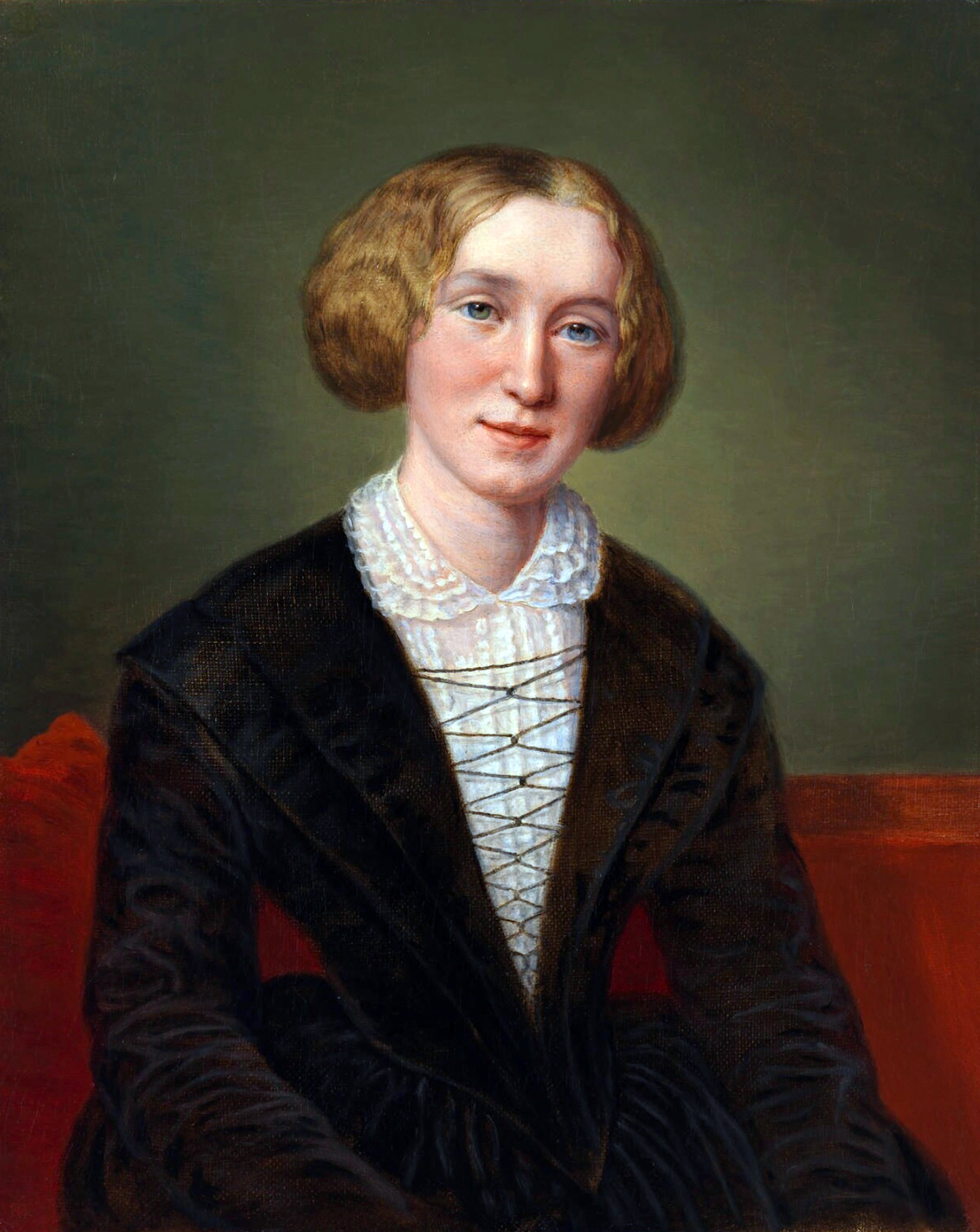
Replica by François D'Albert Durade, George Eliot (Mary Ann Evans), oil on canvas, 1849–1886, National Portrait Gallery

On 18 February 1841, Lewes married 19-year-old Agnes Jervis, daughter of Swynfen Stevens Jervis, who gave written permission for the marriage and witnessed the wedding. There are several theories about how they met, such as Lewes working for Swynfen Jervis as a secretary or tutor for his sons. They may have met through Thornton Hunt's circle of friends. Jervis was young, and considered "lovely", "charming", and intelligent. She took positions as a translator to augment the family's income.

The couple lived in Kensington in the houses of Lewes's mother and others. Lewes and Agnes Jervis agreed to have an open marriage. Between 1842 and 1848, Lewes and his wife had four sons together, Charles Lee, Thornton Arnott, Herbert Arthur, and St Vincent Arthy. Agnes also had four children by Lewes's best friend (Thornton Hunt), the son of Leigh Hunt. Because Lewes was named on the birth certificate as the father of one of these children despite knowing this to be false, he was considered complicit in adultery and was not able to divorce Agnes. Lewes left his wife in 1854 to live with Mary Ann Evans.

Of his sons only one, Charles (1843–1891), survived him. He was elected as the first London County Councillor (1888) for St Pancras North. He was also much interested in the Hampstead Heath extension. Charles married Gertrude Hill, granddaughter of Thomas Southwood Smith and sister of the social reformers Miranda Hill and Octavia Hill, the latter of whom jointly founded the National Trust.

=== Relationship with Mary Ann Evans ===
Lewes met writer Mary Ann Evans, later to be famous as George Eliot, in 1851, and by 1854 they had decided to live together. As a result, the couple lived with scandal for some time and Evans's family spurned them. They lived together as husband and wife, although never married, for 25 years. Lewes died in 1878. In about two years, Evans had married John Cross and after seven months of marriage she died suddenly in December 1880. She was buried next to Lewes at Highgate Cemetery.

== Literature ==
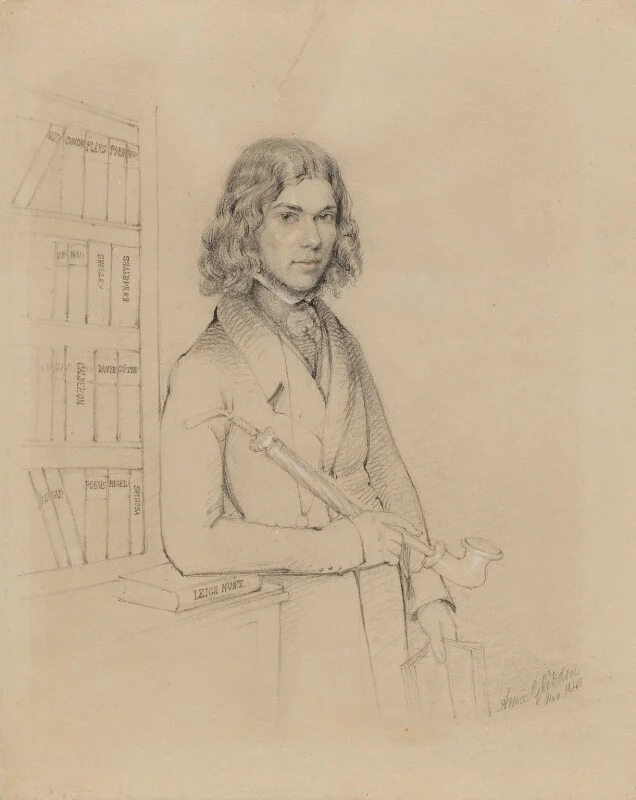
Anne Gliddon, George Henry Lewes, 1840, graphite and watercolor. Lewes, age twenty three, "the most amusing little fellow in the whole world—if you only overlook his unparalleled impudence, which is not impudence at all but man of genius bonhomie (Mrs Carlyle, Letters, 5 February 1849)

From 1840 to 1850, Lewes supported himself by contributing to quarterly and other reviews, articles discussing a wide range of subjects, often imperfect but revealing acute critical judgment enlightened by philosophic study. The most valuable are those on drama, afterwards republished under the title Actors and Acting (1875), and The Spanish Drama (1846).

In 1845–46, Lewes published The Biographical History of Philosophy, an attempt to depict the life of philosophers as an ever-renewed fruitless labour to attain the unattainable. In 1847–48, he published two novels – Ranthorpe, and Rose, Blanche and Violet – which, though displaying considerable skill in plot, construction, and characterisation, have taken no permanent place in literature. The same is to be said of an ingenious attempt to rehabilitate Robespierre (1849). In 1850, he collaborated with Thornton Leigh Hunt in the foundation of The Leader, of which he was the literary editor. In 1853, he republished under the title of Comte's Philosophy of the Sciences a series of papers which had appeared in that journal.

The culmination of Lewes's work in prose literature is the Life of Goethe (1855), probably the best known of his writings. Lewes's versatility, and his combination of scientific with literary tastes, eminently fitted him to appreciate the wide-ranging activity of the German poet. The work became well known in Germany itself, despite the boldness of its criticism and the unpopularity of some of its views (e.g. on the relation of the second to the first part of Faust).

=== Science ===
From about 1853, Lewes's writings show that he was occupying himself with scientific and more particularly biological work. He always showed a distinctly scientific bent in his writings, though he had not had technical training. More than popular expositions of accepted scientific truths, they contain able criticisms of conventionally accepted ideas and embody the results of individual research and individual reflection. He made several suggestions, some of which have since been accepted by physiologists, of which the most valuable is that now known as the doctrine of the functional indifference of the nerves – that what were known as the specific energies of the optic, auditory and other nerves are simply differences in their mode of action due to the differences of the peripheral structures or sense-organs with which they are connected. This idea was subsequently proposed independently by Wundt.

=== Philosophy ===
In 1865, when The Fortnightly Review began publication, Lewes became its editor, but he retained the post for less than two years, when he was succeeded by John Morley.

This marks the transition from more strictly scientific to philosophic work. Lewes had been interested in philosophy from early youth; one of his earliest essays was an appreciative account of Hegel's Aesthetics. Under the influence of the positivism of Auguste Comte and John Stuart Mill's A System of Logic, he abandoned all faith in the possibility of metaphysics, and recorded this abandonment in his History of Philosophy. Yet he did not at any time give unqualified assent to Comte's teachings, and with wider reading and reflection his mind moved further away from the positivist stance. In the preface to the third edition of his History of Philosophy he avowed a change in this direction, and this movement is even more plainly discernible in subsequent editions of the work.

The outcome of his intellectual progress is The Problems of Life and Mind. His sudden death cut short the work, yet it is complete enough to allow a judgment on the author's matured conceptions on biological, psychological and metaphysical problems.

The first two volumes on The Foundations of a Creed laid down Lewes's foundation – a rapprochement between metaphysics and science. He was still positivist enough to pronounce all inquiry into the ultimate nature of things fruitless: what matter, form, and spirit are in themselves is a futile question that belongs to the sterile region of "metempirics". But philosophical questions may be susceptible to a precise solution through scientific method. Thus, since the relation of subject to object falls within our experience, it is a proper matter for philosophic investigation.

His treatment of the question of the relation of subject to object confused the scientific truth that mind and body coexist in the living organism and the philosophic truth that all knowledge of objects implies a knowing subject. In Shadworth Hodgson's phrase, he mixed up the genesis of mental forms with their nature (see Philosophy of Reflexion, ii. 40–58). Thus he reached a monistic doctrine that mind and matter are two aspects of the same existence by attending simply to the parallelism between psychical and physical processes as a given fact (or probable fact) of our experience, leaving out of account their relation as subject and object in the cognitive act.

His identification of the two as phases of one existence is open to criticism not only from the point of view of philosophy but from that of science. In his treatment of such ideas as "sensibility", "sentience" and the like, he does not always make it clear whether he is speaking of physical or of psychical phenomena. Among other philosophic questions discussed in these two volumes the nature of causal relation is perhaps the one which is handled with most freshness and suggestiveness.

The third volume, The Physical Basis of Mind, further develops the writer's views on organic activities as a whole. He insists on the radical distinction between organic and inorganic processes and the impossibility of explaining the former by purely mechanical principles. All parts of the nervous system have the same elementary property; sensibility. Thus sensibility belongs as much to the lower centres of the spinal cord as to the brain, the former, more elementary, form contributing to the subconscious region of mental life, while the higher functions of the nervous system, which make up our conscious mental life, are more complex modifications of this fundamental property of nerve substance.

The nervous organism acts as a whole, particular mental operations cannot be referred to definite regions of the brain, and the hypothesis of nervous activity by an isolated pathway from one nerve cell to another is altogether illusory. By insisting on the complete coincidence between the regions of nerve action and sentience, that these are but different aspects of one thing, he was able to attack the doctrine of animal and human automatism which affirms that feeling or consciousness is merely an incidental concomitant of nerve action in no way essential to the chain of physical events.

Lewes's views on psychology, partly explained in the earlier volumes of the Problems, are more fully worked out in the last two (3rd series). He discussed the method of psychology with much insight. Against Comte and his followers he claimed a place for introspection in psychological research. As well as this subjective method there must be an objective one, a reference to nervous conditions and socio-historical data. Biology would help explain mental functions such as feeling and thinking, it would not help us to understand differences of mental faculty in different races and stages of human development. The organic conditions of these differences will probably for ever escape detection, hence they can be explained only as the products of the social environment. The relationship of mental phenomena to social and historical conditions is probably Lewes's most important contribution to psychology.

He also emphasised the complexity of mental phenomena. Every mental state is regarded as compounded of three factors in different proportions – sensible affection, logical grouping and motor impulse. But Lewes's work in psychology consists less in discoveries than in method. His biological experience prepared him to view mind as a complex unity of which the highest processes are identical with and evolved out of the lower. Thus the operation of thought, or "the logic of signs", is a more complicated form of the elementary operations of sensation and instinct or "the logic of feeling".

== Death ==
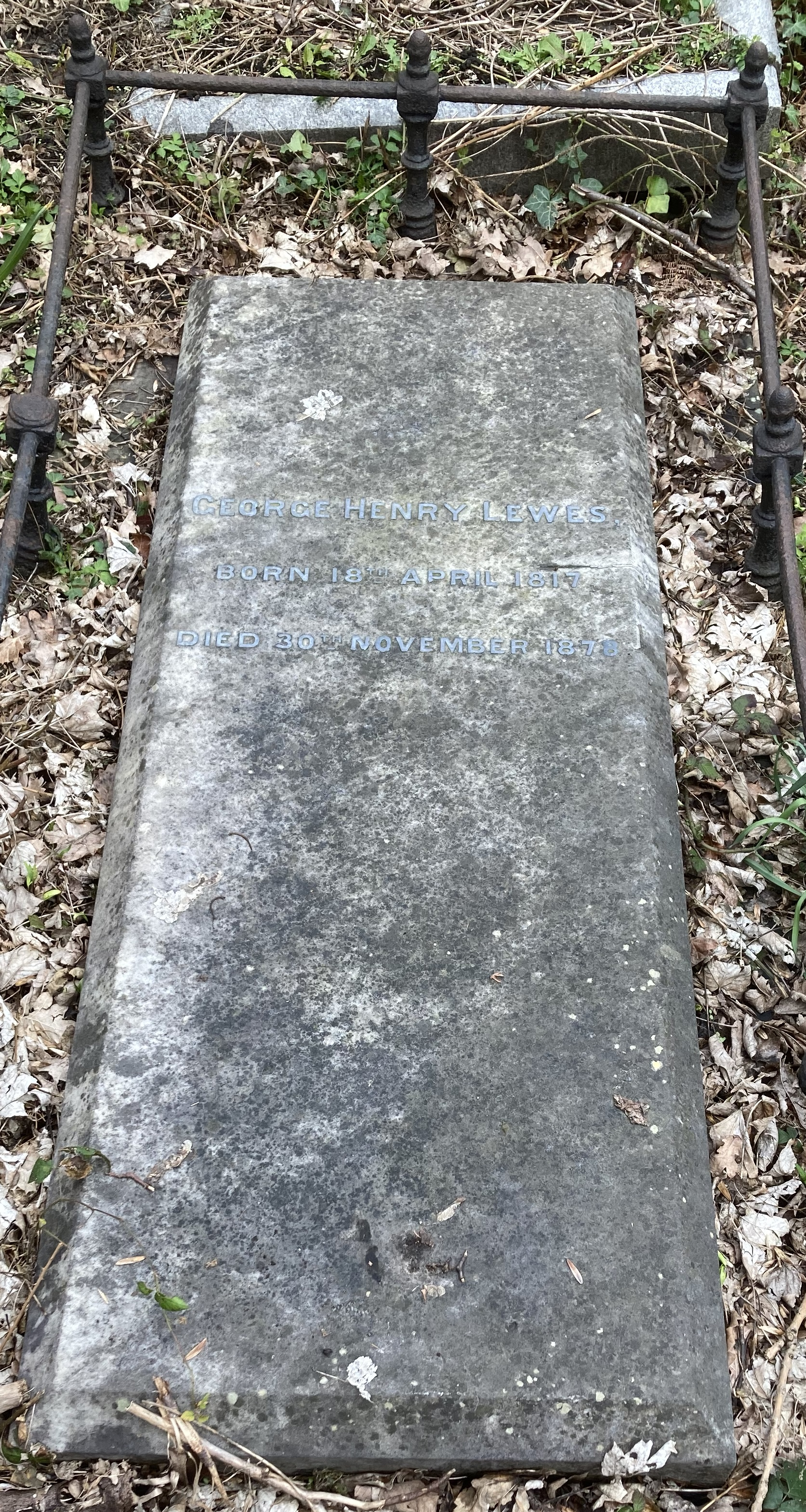
Grave of George Henry Lewes in Highgate Cemetery

Lewes died on 30 November 1878 and is buried on the eastern side of Highgate Cemetery, diagonally across from the grave of his common-law wife Mary Ann Evans, known best by her pen name George Eliot. She died 22 December 1880, and was buried as Mary Ann Cross, her remarried name.

== Publications ==
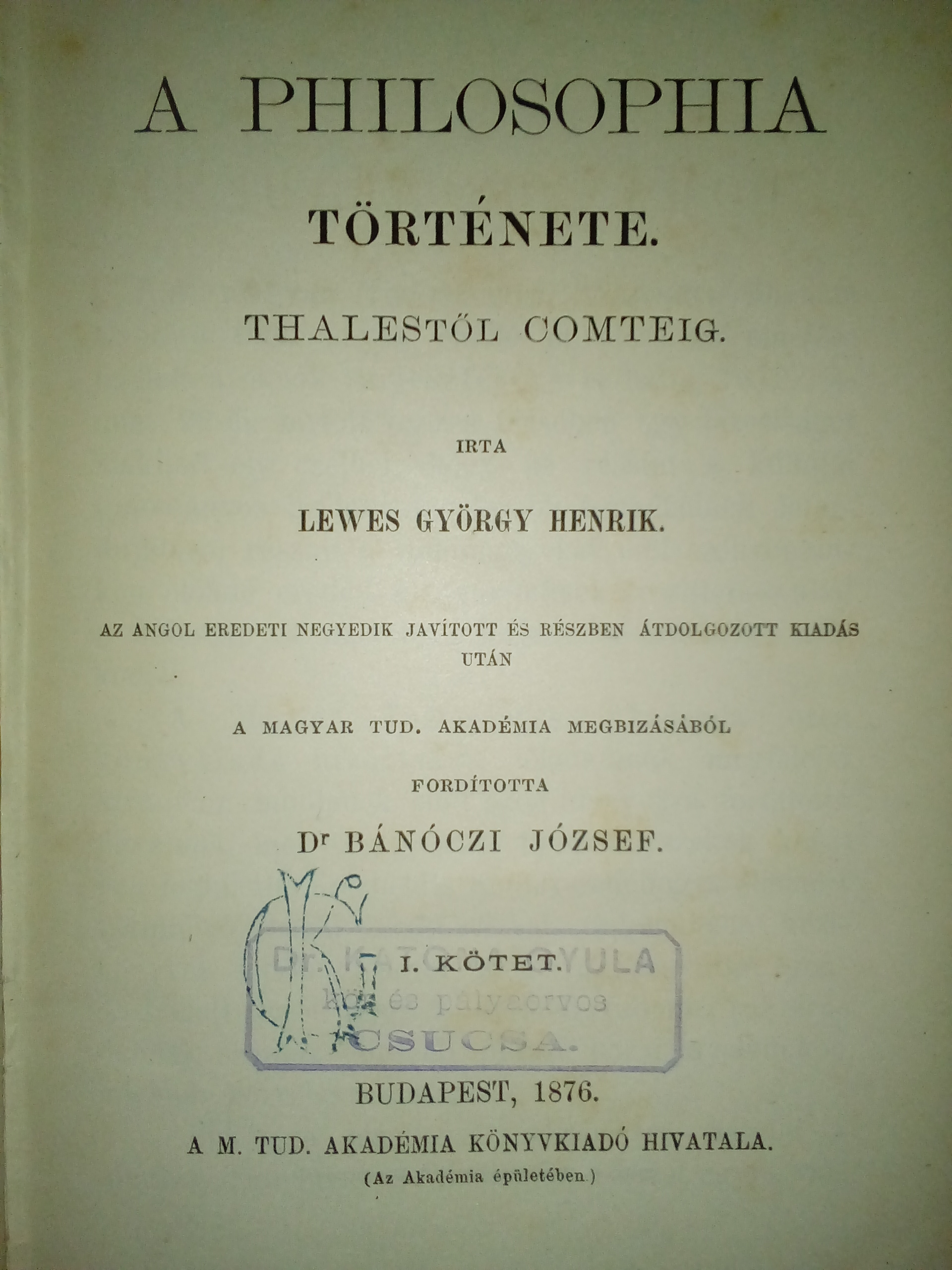
History of Philosophy (Hungarian edition, 1876)

- The Biographical History of Philosophy (1846). Adamant Media 2002: ISBN 0-543-96985-1
- The Spanish Drama (1846)
- Ranthorpe (1847)
- Rose, Blanche and Violet (1848)
- Robespierre (1849)
- Comte's Philosophy of the Sciences (1853). Adamant Media 2000: ISBN 1-4021-9950-3
- Life of Goethe (1855). Adamant Media 2000: ISBN 0-543-93077-7
- Seaside Studies (1858)
- Physiology of Common Life (1859)
- Studies in Animal Life (1862)
- Aristotle, A Chapter from the History of Science (1864). Adamant Media 2001: ISBN 0-543-81753-9
- Actors and Acting (1875)
- The Problems of Life and Mind (five volumes)
  - First Series: The Foundations of a Creed, Volume 1 (1874)
  - First Series: The Foundations of a Creed, Volume 2 (1874)
  - Second Series: The Physical Basis of Mind (1877)
  - Third Series, Volume 1: The Study of Psychology: Its Object, Scope, and Method (completed by George Eliot and published posthumously in 1879)
  - Third Series, Volume 2: Mind as a Function of Organism (completed by George Eliot and published posthumously in 1879)
- New Quarterly (London, October 1879)
- J. W. Cross, George Eliot's Life as Related in Her Letters and Journals (three volumes, New York, 1885)

== See also ==
- Emergence
- G. E. Moore
