= Matthew James Higgins =

British writer (1810–1868)

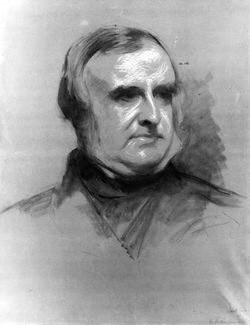
Higgins portrayed by Samuel Laurence.

Matthew James Higgins (4 December 1810 – 14 August 1868) was a British writer who used the pen name Jacob Omnium, which was the title of his first magazine article. He was born in County Meath, Ireland to a landed family. He owned an estate in British Guiana, which he visited twice.

Higgins became well known for his aggressive, campaigning journalism. His first essay was a satire on dishonest business practices, entitled "Jacob Omnium, the Merchant Prince". It was published in New Monthly Magazine in 1845. Though the name was that of the villain, he adopted it as his main pen-name. Nevertheless, he also used other names such as "Civilian", "Paterfamilias", "West Londoner", "Belgravian Mother", "Mother of Six" and "John Barleycorn".

He was particularly active on behalf of sufferers from the Great Famine in 1847, demanding more decisive action and volunteering as an agent of the British Relief Association. His The real bearings of the West India question (1847) advocated support for West Indian plantation owners who, he argued, could not compete against slave-owning countries which bore no wage costs.

He contributed regularly to the Peelite newspaper The Morning Chronicle and also to The Times, the Pall Mall Gazette and the Cornhill Magazine (under Thackeray's editorship). His letters in The Times were instrumental in exposing many abuses. Like his friend Thackerary, he was active in gentlemen's social clubs, being a member of many London clubs and societies, including the Philobiblon Society and the Cosmopolitan Club. He was married to Emily Joseph, daughter of Sir Henry Joseph Tichborne.

Thackeray dedicated to him his novel The Adventures of Philip, and one of his ballads, Jacob Omnium's Hoss, deals with an incident in Higgins's career.

Some of his articles were published in 1875 as Essays on Social Subjects.
