= New West End Synagogue =

Synagogue in London, England

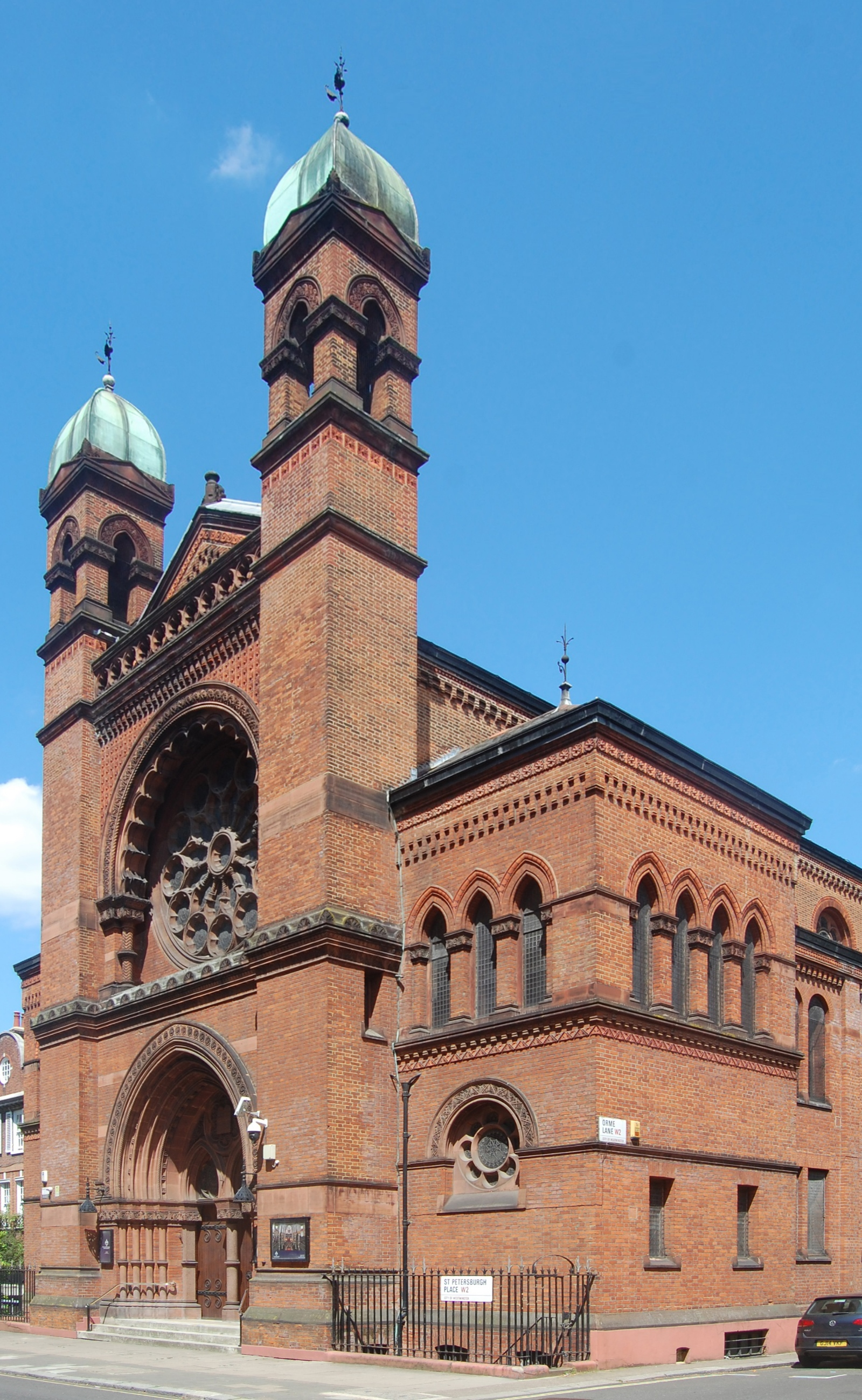
- The synagogue façade from St. Petersburgh Place

- Location of the synagogue in the City of Westminster

Religion
- Affiliation: Orthodox Judaism
- Rite: Nusach Ashkenaz
- Ecclesiastical or organisational status: Synagogue
- Leadership: Rabbi Aaron Lipsey
- Year consecrated: 1879; 147 years ago
- Status: Active

Location
- Location: St. Petersburgh Place, Bayswater, City of Westminster, London, England, W2 4JT
- Country: United Kingdom
- Coordinates: 51°30′40″N 0°11′26″W

Architecture
- Architects: George Audsley; William James Audsley; Nathan S. Joseph
- Type: Synagogue architecture
- Style: Creative Eclecticism
- Completed: 1879
- Construction cost: £24,980 (1879)

Website
- newwestend.org.uk

Listed Building – Grade I
- Official name: New West End Synagogue
- Designated: 27 June 1975
- Reference no.: 1264769

The New West End Synagogue is an Orthodox Jewish congregation and synagogue, located in St. Petersburgh Place, Bayswater, in the City of Westminster, London, England, in the United Kingdom. The congregation has been a member of United Synagogue since 1879.

Completed in 1879, the synagogue building is one of the oldest synagogues in the United Kingdom in use and was designated as a Grade I listed building by Historic England in 1975. Styled in the form of Creative Eclecticism, the architectural style of the building show symbolic references to the Islamic, Japanese, Gothic Revival, Saracenic and Classical Revival styles.

== History ==
Designed by George Audsley of Scotland in collaboration with Nathan S. Joseph, its foundation stone was laid on 7 June 1877 by Leopold de Rothschild in the presence of the Chief Rabbi, Dr. Nathan Marcus Adler, and the building was formally opened on 30 March 1879. It can seat 800 people.

The synagogue's first rabbi was Simeon Singer, who translated and edited the ‘’Authorised Daily Prayer Book‘’, which is still used in Orthodox synagogues across Great Britain.

Perhaps the best known rabbi of New West End Synagogue was Louis Jacobs, whose ties with the synagogue were severed in what became known as the Jacobs affair, and who went on to found the Masorti movement. Jacobs' supporters left to found the New London Synagogue in Abbey Road, St John's Wood.

In August 2007, the New West End Synagogue was declared a national monument (Grade 1 listing status).

== Music ==
The New West End has a long heritage of choral music. The first choirmaster was David M. Davis, the compiler of The Voice of Prayer and Praise, known as the Blue Book, and the standard work on Anglo-Jewish minhag (customs). Davis spend 50 years as choirmaster, from 1879.

Mosaic Voices, the choir at New West End, was founded and is conducted by Michael Etherton, who studied cello at Trinity College of Music and conducting at the Jerusalem Academy of Music and Dance. He is also Chief Executive of UK Jewish Film. Most of the Mosaic Voices choristers are either professional singers or musicians. The choir's repertoire spans 400 years from works by Salmone di Rossi to new works commissioned by current or recent choristers such as Benjamin Till and Toby Young. Mosaic Voices' CD The Blue Book was released in 2019.

Benjamin Till is the synagogue's composer-in-residence.

== Architecture ==
The building was designed by George Ashdown Audsley and William James Audsley of Liverpool. Their output was primarily Protestant churches, but this project and that for the Old Hebrew Congregation, Prince's Road, Liverpool were two exceptions. Other activities included the publication of books on ornament and Japanese art. Both brothers eventually moved to the New York City area. George became a designer of pipe organs and published notable works on pipe organs.

The Audsleys were particularly fond of historical ornament from various sources. Their churches were High Victorian Gothic Revival, but their secular buildings and synagogues could feature elements of Egyptian, Greek, Saracenic, and Hindu architecture.

Particularly notable is the splendid Torah ark. Designed by Joseph, it closely resembles the ark he designed for Glasgow's Garnethill Synagogue; both arks are raised on platforms, approached by a series of circular marble steps, and project into the room in the form of a multi-domed and arched building.

The building was described as “the architectural high-water mark of Anglo-Jewish architecture”.

== See also ==
- History of the Jews in England
- List of Jewish communities in the United Kingdom
- List of synagogues in the United Kingdom
- Oldest synagogues in the United Kingdom
