= Sandys Row Synagogue =

Grade II listed synagogue in London Borough of Tower Hamlets, England

Sandy's Row Synagogue
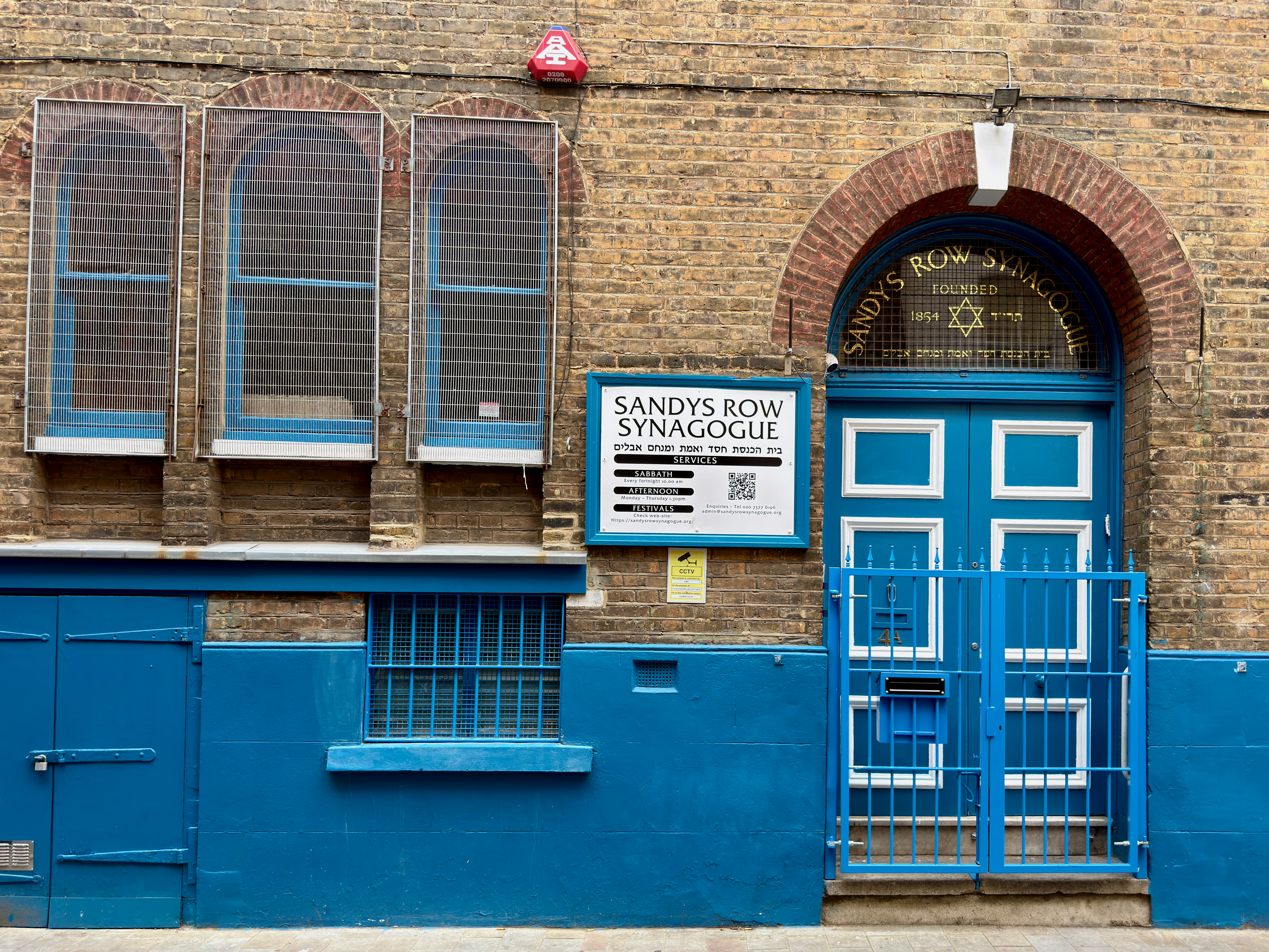
- The synagogue in 2026

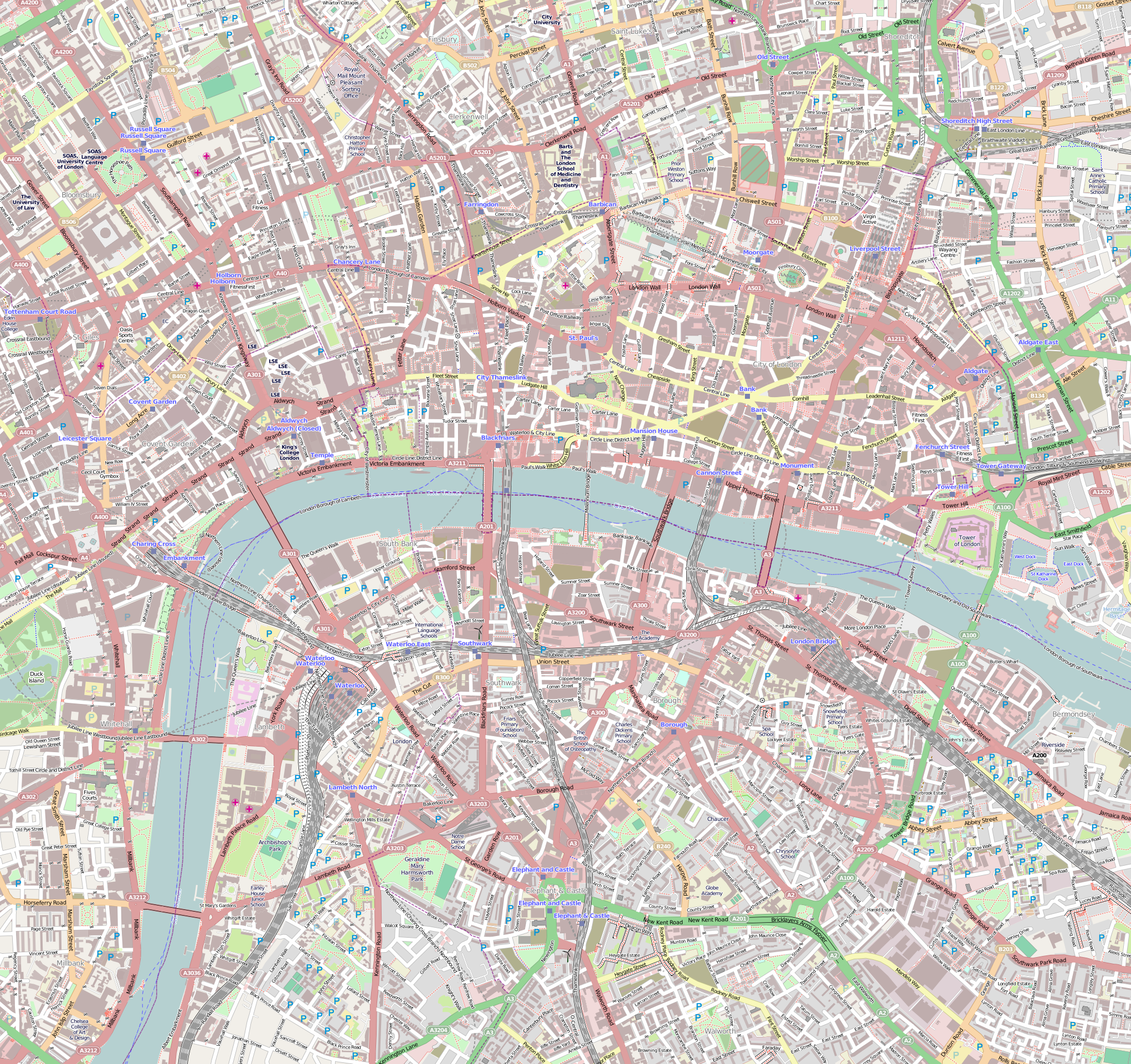
- Location of the synagogue in Central London

Religion
- Affiliation: Orthodox Judaism
- Rite: Nusach Ashkenaz
- Ecclesiastical or organisational status: Church (1766–1867); Synagogue (since 1867)
- Status: Active

Location
- Location: Sandys Row, corner Middlesex Street, Bishopsgate, East End, Borough of Tower Hamlets, London, England E1 7HW
- Country: United Kingdom
- Coordinates: 51°31′06″N 0°04′40″W

Architecture
- Architect: Nathan S. Joseph (1867)
- Type: Church
- Style: Neoclassical architecture
- Established: 1853 (as a congregation)
- Completed: 1766 (as a church); 1867 (as a synagogue)

Specifications
- Length: 15 metres (48 ft)
- Width: 11 metres (36 ft)

Listed Building – Grade II
- Official name: Sandys Row Synagogue
- Type: Listed building
- Designated: 20 July 1987
- Reference no.: 1260323

Sandy's Row Synagogue is an Orthodox Jewish congregation and synagogue, located on Sandys Row, on the corner of Middlesex Street in Bishopsgate, in the East End, Borough of Tower Hamlets, London, England, in the United Kingdom.

The building was built by refugee French Huguenots in 1766 as a church, it was later converted into a Baptist chapel, and in 1867 was acquired by a Jewish congregation. Historic England added the building as a Grade II listed building in 1987. It is the oldest surviving Ashkenazi synagogue in London.

== History ==
The building was constructed in 1766 by refugee French Huguenots as a community church, named L'Eglise de l'Artillerie (the Artillery Church), on a small street called Parliament Court, Artillery Street, in Bishopsgate. The church took its name from the street, which in turn took its name from the fact that in the time of Henry VIII, the artillery practiced there.

With changing demographics, the church passed into the hands of the Universalist Baptists, the Unitarian Baptists, the Scottish Baptists, and the Salem Chapel. In the mid-19th century, it was purchased by a Jewish society, the Hevrat Menahem Avalim Hesed v'Emeth (Heb: The Comforters of Mourners Kindness and Truth Society). The society had been founded by immigrants in 1853 as a mutual aid and burial insurance society, but evolved into a synagogue. The members were workingmen of Dutch Ashkenazi background, employed as cigar makers, diamond cutters and fruit traders. They acquired the building in 1867.

The building renovation was opposed by London's established synagogues, whose officials believed that new immigrants ought to join one of the established congregations. The poor, immigrant Jews of London's East End, however, felt so strongly about having a synagogue of their own that, rather than sitting in the free or cheap seats reserved for the poor in the established synagogues, they raised money to purchase and renovate the building at the rate of a penny per family per week. The Chief Rabbi of London, Nathan Marcus Adler, refused to preside over the dedication ceremonies. The total cost of the renovation came to £1,000. The building contractor held a mortgage for most of the cost, which the congregation paid off at the rate of £70 per year.

By 1881 Sandys Row was among the largest congregations in the East End, with a membership of over 460 families and adult men.

=== Recent history ===
After the Great Synagogue of London, the city's first Ashkenazi congregation, was destroyed by German bombing in the London Blitz on 10 May 1941, Sandys Row became the oldest surviving Ashkenazi synagogue in London.

In May 2009 English Heritage awarded a grant of £250,000 for the restoration of the synagogue's Huguenot roof. In November 2010, building work began and the new roof is now in place.

Today, the synagogue is the last remaining Jewish place of worship in Spitalfields. As of 2017, it is in use for weekday afternoon prayers, for Sabbath services every other week, for Jewish festivals, and for tours of the historic building. A plan for using the historic synagogue to house a museum or heritage centre celebrating the Jews of London's East End received funding in 2009, and remained under consideration in 2026.

== Architecture ==
The congregation hired architect Nathan S. Joseph to remodel the former church. The building is rectangular and measures 15 by 11 metres (48 by 36 ft). A women's gallery runs along the north, west, and south walls. The difficulty was that the entrance was on the south east corner of the building. Jews traditionally pray in the direction of Jerusalem, which, in London, in towards the southeast. Joseph's solution was to brick up the former entrance, place the Torah Ark on the southeast wall, and open a new door on the northwest wall, opening onto Sandys Row.

Solomon modeled the handsome Georgian interior after the style of the Great Synagogue of London in Duke's Place. Like the Great Synagogue, Sandys Row has a coved ceiling, cornice, clerestory windows and a Neo-classical Torah Ark set into an apse. The pews are of pine and the Torah Ark of mahogany. The interior is almost unaltered since its construction in the nineteenth century.

== Popular culture ==
The synagogue was the central location for The Tenth Man, a 2006 short film directed by Sam Leifer and starring Warren Mitchell and Steven Berkoff.

== See also ==
- Chuts
- History of the Jews in England
- List of Jewish communities in the United Kingdom
- List of synagogues in the United Kingdom
