= Kehillat Kernow =

Reform Jewish community in Cornwall, England

Kehillat Kernow (The Jewish Community of Cornwall)

Religion
- Affiliation: Reform Judaism
- Ecclesiastical or organizational status: Congregation
- Status: Active

Location
- Location: Truro, Cornwall, England
- Country: United Kingdom

Architecture
- Established: 1999 (as a congregation)

Website
- kehillatkernow.com

Kehillat Kernow is a Reform Jewish congregation, that worships from various locations in Truro, Cornwall, England, in the United Kingdom. Founded in 1999 as the Jewish Community of Cornwall, the name of the congregation is a combination of the Hebrew word kehillat (community) and the Cornish word Kernow, meaning Cornwall.

The congregation is a member of the Movement for Reform Judaism and had approximately 100 members in 2014.

== Services ==
Logo of the congregation

Services take place fortnightly on Shabbat mornings at 10:30 and are held in a local school, with alternative venues for High Holidays and some festivals. They are led by members of the community and, occasionally, by visiting student rabbis from Leo Baeck College.

The community uses a Torah scroll on permanent loan from Exeter Synagogue and also one that it received from the Royal Cornwall Museum in Truro. The scroll was previously used by Falmouth Synagogue, which closed in 1882. It was officially handed over by the Duke of Gloucester to Kehillat Kernow at a ceremony in the Royal Cornwall Museum on 28 May 2004.

The community runs a cheder for children and young people aged 2 to 15.

The congregation publishes three times a year a newsletter called Kol Kehillat Kernow.

== See also ==
- History of the Jews in England
- List of Jewish communities in the United Kingdom
- List of synagogues in the United Kingdom
