= Plymouth Synagogue =

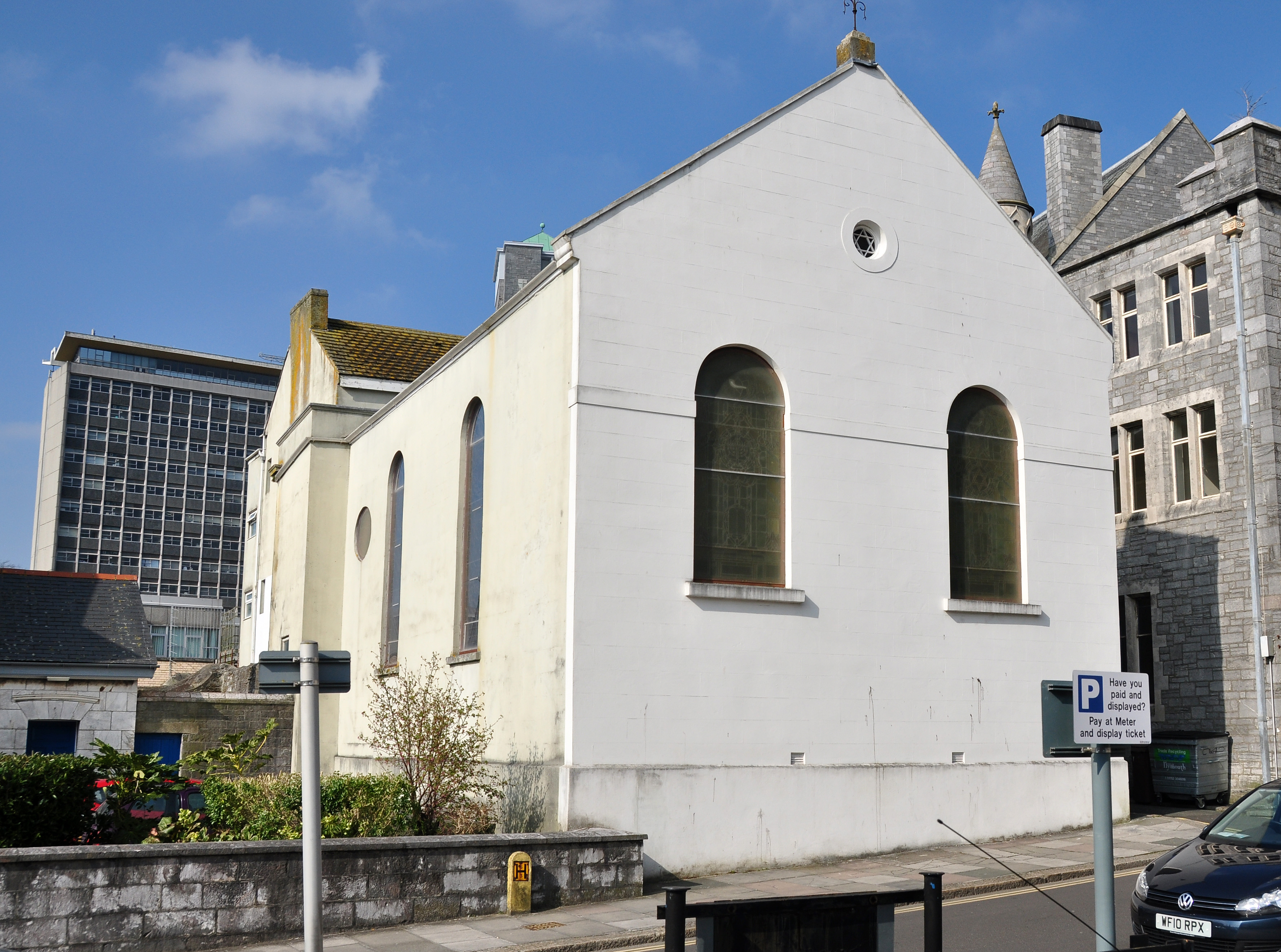
- The synagogue in 2011

- Location of the synagogue in Devon

Religion
- Affiliation: Orthodox Judaism
- Rite: Nusach Ashkenaz
- Ecclesiastical or organizational status: Synagogue
- Status: Active

Location
- Location: Catherine Street, Plymouth, Devon, England PL1 2A
- Country: United Kingdom
- Interactive map of Plymouth Synagogue
- Coordinates: 50°22′10″N 4°08′27″W

Architecture
- Established: c. 1740s (as a congregation)
- Groundbreaking: 1762
- Completed: 1764
- Materials: Stucco; slate roof

Website
- https://www.plymouthsynagogue.co.uk/

Listed Building – Grade II*
- Official name: Synagogue, Catherine Street, Plymouth
- Type: Listed building
- Designated: 25 January 1954
- Reference no.: 1130015

The Plymouth Synagogue, also called the Plymouth Hebrew Congregation, is an Orthodox Jewish congregation and synagogue, located on Catherine Street, in the city of Plymouth, Devon, England, in the United Kingdom. The congregation was formed in c. 1740s and worships in the Ashkenazi rite.

The synagogue building was commenced in 1762 and completed in 1764, making it the oldest extant synagogue built by Ashkenazi Jews in the English speaking world. The synagogue building was listed as a Grade II* building in 1954.

== History ==
A Jewish community was present in Plymouth by the mid-18th century. The members were immigrants, primarily from the German lands and the Netherlands. Most were members of an extended family with the surname Emden.

They are known to have been meeting regularly for services in private homes by 1745, at some point the services moved to rented rooms. Plans for building a synagogue had begun by 1759. In 1762 building land was leased, but the lease was signed by a Christian named Samuel Champion since it was not clear that leases signed by Jews were legal. The Congregation bought the freehold in 1834.

== Architecture ==
No architect's name is recorded, and it is assumed that the rectangular, pitched-roof structure was designed and erected by a local master builder. The building is of whitewashed brick and stone with a roof of Cornish slate. The street front is the eastern end of the synagogue, so the door is placed on the western front, in what is effectively the back garden. The building is tucked on a side-street, Sharman Kadish, the leading expert on Jewish buildings in Britain, believes that an unobtrusive location was chosen to avoid provoking the destructive riots that non-Anglican houses of worship often provoked in the eighteenth century. Nothing on the exterior distinguishes the building from the meeting houses of Nonconformist Protestants.

Kadish believes that the corniced entrance, the date and Psalms 95:6 (O come, let us worship and bow down: let us kneel before the LORD our maker) written in Hebrew dates from the renovation of 1863–1864. The cornerstone of the adjacent three-storey building housing various synagogue offices is dated with the Jewish year 5634 (1874). There is a mikveh in a room off the vestry (hall) and it is open to viewing. It is of white tiling and is no longer in use. The water has been diverted partly due to an irreparable leak and also to logistics.

The vestibule is floored with Minton terracotta tile dating from a Victorian era renovation, the present stairs to the women's galleries were built at the same time. The vestibule appears to be a Victorian addition to a prayer hall that was originally entered without a vestibule, the women's galleries probably had external staircases as was once common.

As was usual in British synagogues, there is a prayer board with the Hebrew prayer for the welfare of the British Royal family. The prayer board at Plymouth dates from 1762. It was usual for the name of each new king to be painted over the names of previous monarchs. At present the names being prayed for are listed as George V and Queen Mary (Mary of Teck).

The interior is simple, with the exception of the elaborate Torah ark. The building has a flat ceiling and a women's gallery along three walls. Originally, the women's gallery was confined to the west end. The windows were originally clear glass. The present stained glass was a 20th-century addition. The pair of windows that flank the Torah ark and open onto the street were added in 1874. Kadish believes that putting synagogue windows on a public street may have been judged unwise in the religious climate of the eighteenth century.

== Torah Ark ==
The elaborate, Baroque Torah Ark rises two storeys, the full height of the building. It features fluted Corinthian columns, a broken pediment, carved finials and urns in gold leaf. On the second storey are a pair of tablets of the Ten Commandments, in gold leaf on a royal blue ground. Inscribed on the cornice is the Hebrew date 5522 (1761–62) and a passage form Psalms 5:8 (Lead me, O LORD, in thy righteousness because of mine enemies; make thy way straight before my face).

The Holy Ark, crafted by cabinetmakers in the Netherlands or Germany, is a free-standing piece of cabinet work, transported from the Netherlands flat-packed, and rebuilt in situ. For many years the Ark had "a gentle golden patina." In 2002, the Ark was restored with gold leaf, white and blue paint, which stands in sharp contract to the plain wood of the rest of the building.

== See also ==
- History of the Jews in England
- List of Jewish communities in the United Kingdom
- List of synagogues in the United Kingdom
- Oldest synagogues in the United Kingdom
