= Nathan S. Joseph =

English philanthropist, social reformer, architect, and Jewish communal leader

Nathan Solomon Joseph (London, 17 December 1834 – 1909) was an English philanthropist, social reformer, architect, and Jewish communal leader.

Joseph collaborated on the design of a number of important synagogues, including the Garnethill Synagogue, New West End Synagogue, and Hampstead Synagogue. He was also noted for his work in designing improved housing for the poor.

Joseph published widely on Jewish and social reform issues. Among his books are Religion Natural and Revealed: A Series of Progressive Lessons for Jewish Youth (1879) and The Persecution of the Jews in Russia (1890). He signed his published work N.S. Joseph.

He is buried in Willesden Jewish Cemetery.

== Buildings ==
=== Collaborations ===
- Garnethill Synagogue
- New West End Synagogue
- Hampstead Synagogue

=== Lead architect ===
- Sandys Row Synagogue
