= Falmouth Synagogue =

Former Jewish synagogue in Conwall, England

- Location of the former synagogue in Cornwall

Religion
- Affiliation: Orthodox Judaism (former)
- Rite: Nusach Ashkenaz
- Ecclesiastical or organizational status: Synagogue (1806–1882)
- Status: Closed; and sold

Location
- Location: 1 Gyllyng Street, Falmouth, Cornwall, England TR11 3EH
- Country: United Kingdom
- Interactive map of Falmouth Synagogue
- Coordinates: 50°09′15″N 5°04′11″W

Architecture
- Established: 1766 (as a congregation)
- Completed: 1806
- Direction of façade: East

Listed Building – Grade II
- Official name: The Old Jewish Synagogue
- Type: Listed building
- Designated: 30 September 1975
- Reference no.: 1270005

The Falmouth Synagogue was a former Orthodox Jewish congregation and synagogue, located at 1 Gyllyng Street in Falmouth, Cornwall, England, in the United Kingdom. Established in 1766, the congregation worshiped in the Ashkenazi rite.

The synagogue building was completed in 1806 and in use until its closure in 1879 and eventual sale in 1881. The former synagogue building overlooked the harbour and was listed as a Grade II building on 30 September 1975; its history is commemorated by a plaque. A Jewish cemetery (next to the Congregationalist Cemetery, Ponsharden) also remains, and is a scheduled monument.

== History ==
By 1766 there were enough Jewish families in Falmouth to make possible the construction of a synagogue, and a second synagogue was completed in 1806 on Smithick Hill as the community grew. Its commanding location, with a fine view of Falmouth harbour, is said to have been so that Jewish merchants could observe their ships entering and leaving the harbour. For so small a community, it is perhaps surprising that it was able to employ a rabbi, and the earliest recorded minister of the community, known as Rabbi Saavil (died 1814), is buried at the town's Jewish cemetery. The last known rabbi was Samuel Herman, recorded in 1851. Shochtim are also recorded as present in the town until as late as 1872.

The synagogue, built in a German style, was closed in 1879 due to the dwindling numbers of the community and in 1892 the Chief Rabbi ordered its sale. The last representative of the community, Samuel Jacob, had left in 1881 and after his death, his widow deposited the Torah scrolls in the Royal Institution of Cornwall in Truro. One of the scrolls, previously held at the Royal Cornwall Museum, is now used by Kehillat Kernow (the Jewish Community of Cornwall).

Other remnants from this community include two yadim and a set of rimmonim, now in the Jewish Museum London.

The former synagogue building was converted into a flat and studio, known as Summerhill Studio.

== See also ==
- History of the Jews in England
- List of former synagogues in the United Kingdom
- Religion in Cornwall
