= Great Synagogue (Łomża) =

Destroyed synagogue in Łomża, Poland

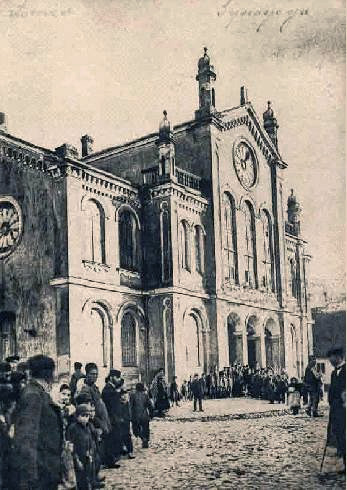
- The former synagogue, undated

- Location of the destroyed synagogue in Podlaskie Voivodeship

Religion
- Affiliation: Orthodox Judaism (former)
- Ecclesiastical or organizational status: Synagogue (1889–c. 1940)
- Status: Destroyed

Location
- Location: Giełczyńska and Senatorska Streets, Łomża, Podlaskie Voivodeship
- Country: Poland
- Interactive map of Great Synagogue
- Coordinates: 53°10′42″N 22°04′54″E

Architecture
- Architect: Enrico Marconi
- Type: Synagogue architecture
- Style: Rundbogenstil
- Founder: Rabbi Eliezer-Simcha Rabinowicz
- Established: 15th century (as a congregation)
- Groundbreaking: 1878
- Completed: 1889
- Destroyed: 1939 or 1941
- Materials: Brick

The Great Synagogue was a former Orthodox Jewish congregation and synagogue, that was located at the southeastern corner of the Main Square, at the intersection of today's Giełczyńska and Senatorska Streets, in Łomża, in the Podlaskie Voivodeship of Poland. Designed by Enrico Marconi in the Rundbogenstil style and completed in 1889, the synagogue served as a house of prayer until World War II when it was destroyed by Nazis between 1939 and 1941.

== History ==
A wooden synagogue was established by the congregation, that dated from the 15th century.

It was built from 1878 to 1889 on the initiative of Rabbi Eliezer-Simcha Rabinowicz, and it was designed by Italian-Polish architect Enrico Marconi from Congress Poland.

From 1918 to 1922, the synagogue's chief cantor was Isaac Hirshow.

The Great Synagogue was destroyed by the invading Germans either in September 1939, at the very beginning of World War II, or in September 1941, soon after the German attack on the Soviet Union and the creation of the Łomża Ghetto for the Jews from surrounding villages and towns. Most likely the Great Synagogue was destroyed in stages, first burned down, and levelled out later.

A memorial plaque marks the site of the former synagogue, with an inscription in Polish and Hebrew, which reads:

From July 1941 to November 1942 in the streets: Dworna – now 22-go Lipca, Senatorska, Woziwodzka, Zielona, Żydowska – now Zatylna, and Rybaki, the Nazis set up a ghetto, where they exterminated 9,000 Poles of Jewish ethnicity. 3,500 of them were shot in the woods near the villages of Giełczyn and Sławiec. The German occupiers established 15 ghettos in the towns of Łomża region. The tragic fate of around 40,000 people living in them led to the extermination camp in Treblinka. May the memory of them and of those who were helping them in those terrible days last.

== See also ==
- History of the Jews in Poland
- List of active synagogues in Poland
