= Richard Cope =

Richard Cope (1776–1856) was an English congregationalist minister and religious writer.

Cope was educated at Hoxton Theological College, 1798–9. He was then minister and proprietor of a boarding-school at Launceston, from 1800 to 1820, receiving an honorary M.A. from Aberdeen University in 1819. He was then minister in Wakefield 1822–9, Abergavenny 1829–36, and Penryn, Cornwall, 1836–56. He published sermons, tracts, and verses.

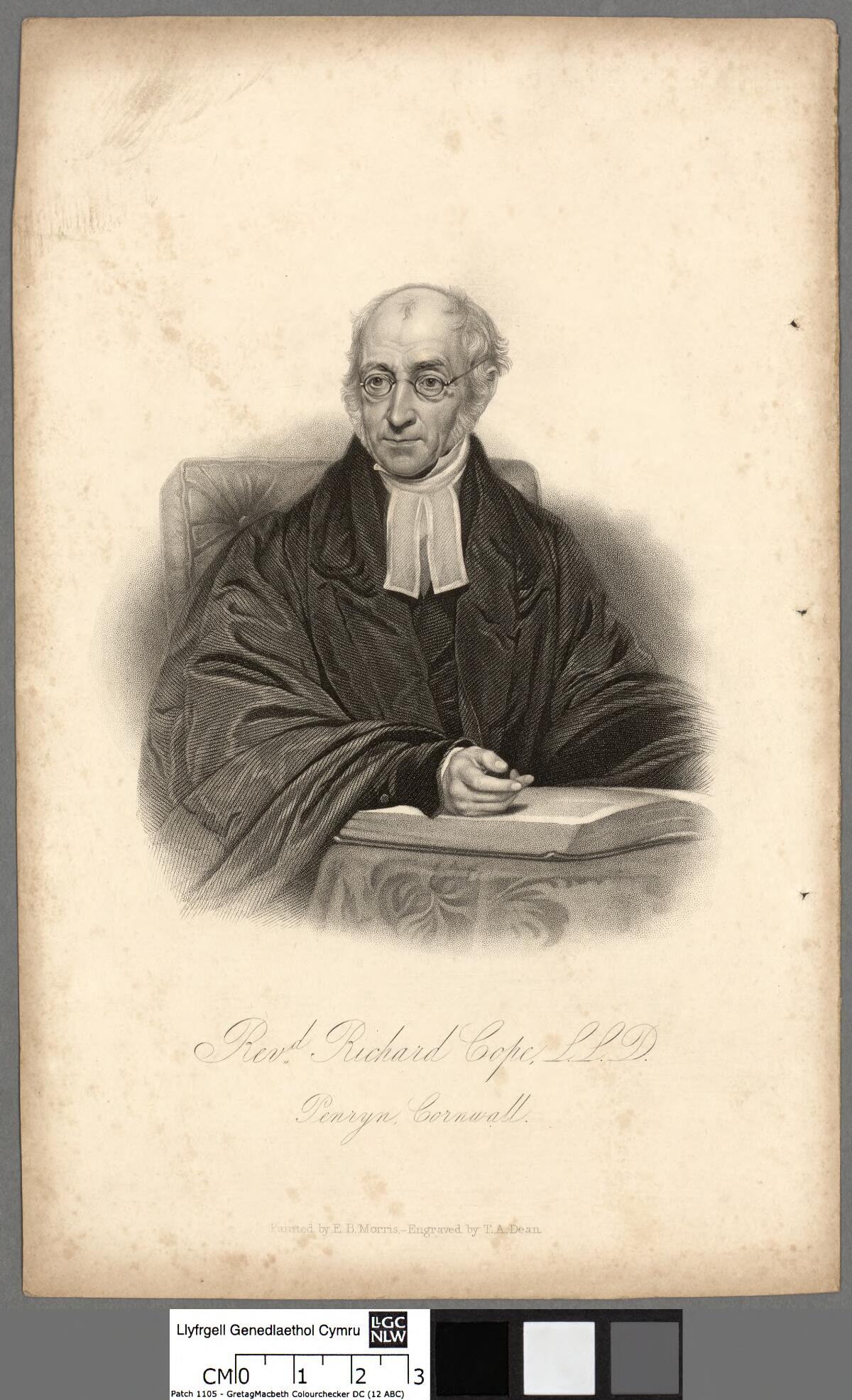
Portrait of Richard Cope, was a religious writer.

== Life ==
He was born near Craven Chapel, Regent Street, London, on 23 August 1776. When less than twelve years old he went into trade; but he became a student at the Theological College, Hoxton, in March 1798. After more than two years there, he received an invitation from the independent congregation at Launceston in Cornwall. He preached his first sermon there (28 June 1800), remained on trial for twelve months, was ordained in the church on 21 October 1801, and remained in that position until 24 June 1820, having for twenty years kept a boarding school, attended by the sons of dissenters throughout the county.

From 1820 to 1822 Cope filled the post of tutor in the Irish Evangelical College, Manor Street, Dublin; but the appointment proved unsatisfactory. Cope returned to preaching. He was minister of Salem Chapel, Wakefield, from 1822 to 1829; of Quebec Chapel, Abergavenny, from 1829 to 1836; and of New Street Independent Chapel at Penryn, in Cornwall, from April 1836 until his death.

Cope died at Penryn on 26 October 1856, and was buried on 31 October in the (now disused) Congregationalist Cemetery at Ponsharden, in Falmouth, Cornwall. His headstone still survives today. The degree of M.A. was conferred upon him at Marischal College, Aberdeen, on 12 March 1819, and he was elected Fellow of the Society of Antiquaries of London on 13 February 1824.

== Works ==
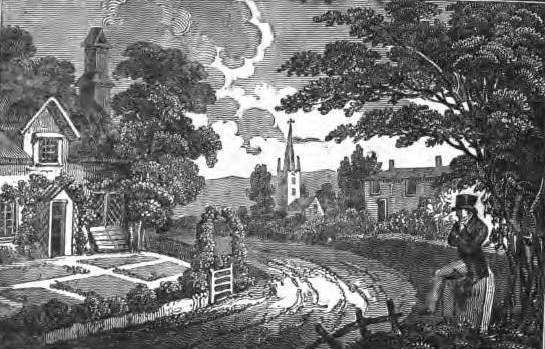
Illustration from Robert Melville, or Characters contrasted (1827)

Cope's Autobiography and Select Remains, edited by his son, R. J. Cope, in 1857, included poems from the Evangelical Magazine (1815–17), and Youth's Magazine (1816). Cope published:

- The object accomplished by the Abolition of the Slave-trade, a sermon, 1807.
- Adventures of a Religious Tract, anonymous (1820, 1825).
- Robert Melville, or Characters contrasted, Abergavenny, 1827.
- Pulpit Synopsis, outlines of sermons, 1837.
- Entertaining Anecdotes, 1838.
- Pietas Privata, 1857.

== Family ==
Cope married Miss Davies at St. James's Church, Piccadilly, on 30 June 1801. Richard Cope Morgan, the editor and publisher, was the son of their daughter Emily, who married James Hiley Morgan.
