= Isaac Hirshow =

British cantor

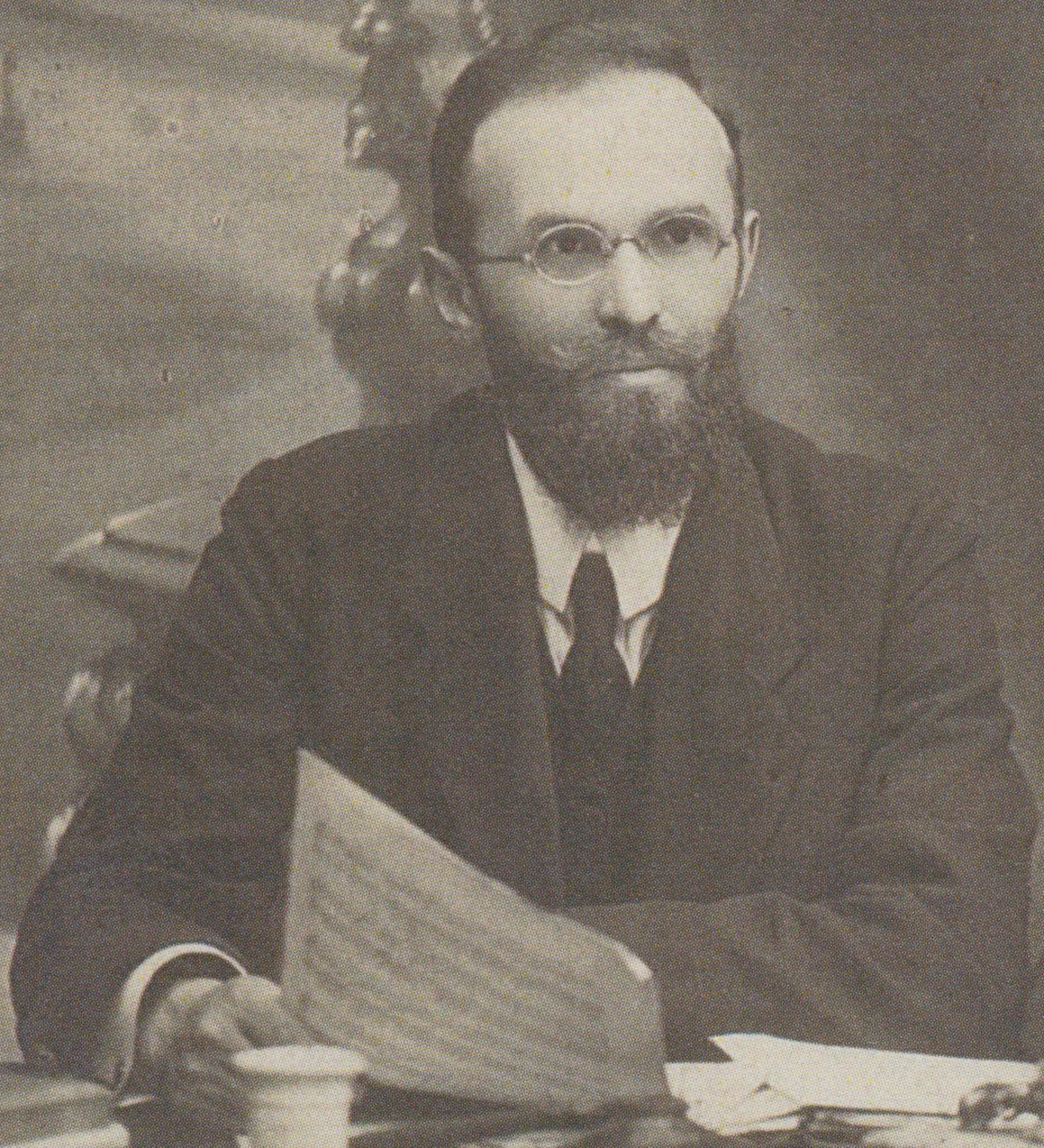
- Born: Yitzak Gershov; 1883; Russian Empire
- Died: 1956 (aged 72–73)
- Alma mater: University of Glasgow
- Occupation: Cantor, composer

Isaac Hirshow (born Yitzak Gershov, 1883; died 1956) was a Russian-born, naturalised British, cantor who in 1939 became the first person to obtain a Bachelor of Music degree at the University of Glasgow. He served at Garnethill Synagogue for thirty years.

== Early life ==
Yitzak Gershov was born in Velizh, Russia in 1883, the son of a merchant named Simon. At the age of fifteen, following his mother's death, he moved to Warsaw, where he was choirmaster at Adas Yeshurunhe Synagogue, and from 1905 a cantor there. In 1918, he became chief cantor at the Great Synagogue of Łomża.

He and his family migrated to Scotland in 1922, and he became a British citizen in 1931.

== Career ==
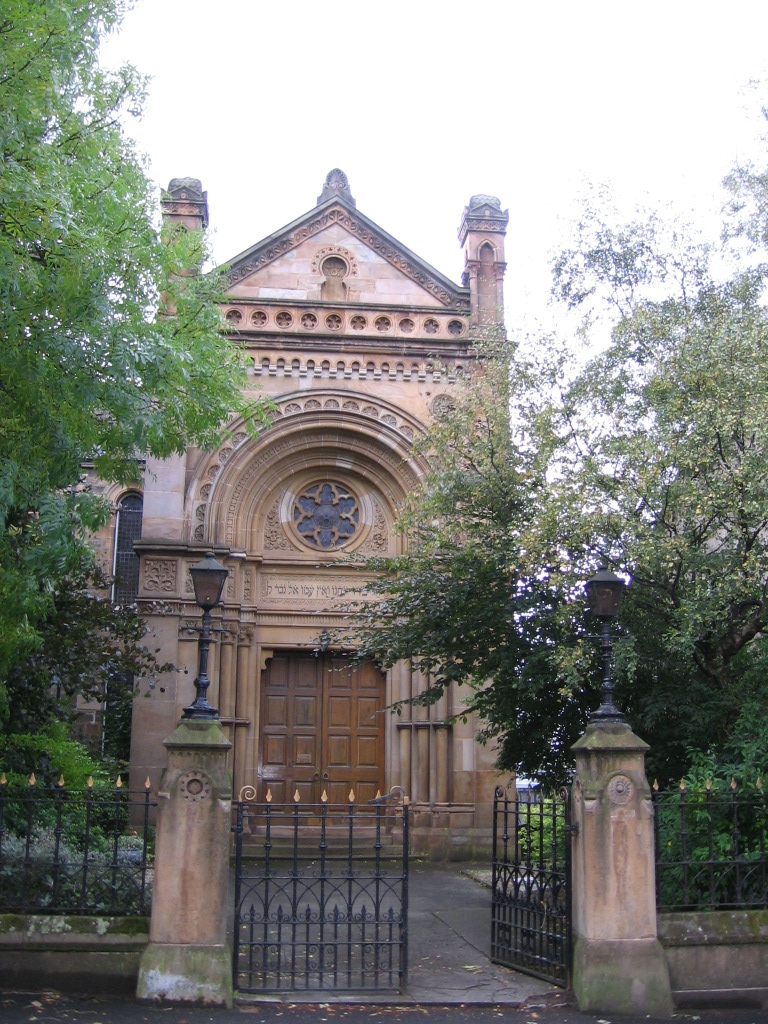
Garnethill Synagogue in 2005

On arrival in Glasgow, Hirshow took up the position of cantor at the Chevra Kadisha synagogue in the Gorbals area of Glasgow. In 1925, he moved to Garnethill Synagogue, where he served for the next thirty years.

He also gave public concerts in Glasgow during the 1920s. The BBC have said that these concerts "helped define Scottish-Jewish identity".

Hirshow graduated with an MA from the University of Glasgow in 1929, and obtained the degree of Bachelor of Music from the same institution in October 1939 (at the same time, his son was also a student there, studying medicine). As he was the first person to do so, he was asked to choose the academic colours for the new qualification, settling on blue and white.

Hirshow also worked as a composer. His compositions include settings of Hebrew poetry. A number of his works are lost.

== Legacy ==
Hirshow died on 23 March 1956 and was interred at Garnethill Hebrew Burial Ground. A memorial service in his honour was held at Garnethill Synagogue on 14 April 1956. At the time of his death there were plans to invite him to lecture at Jews' College.

He is one of several composers who are the subjects of a collaboration between BBC Radio 3 and the Arts and Humanities Research Council, launched in 2020, to research ethnically diverse composers. One outcome of the project was that what is understood to be the first full performance of his The Hope of Israel, written as his final degree piece, was premiered on Radio 3's "Afternoon Concert" programme, performed by the BBC Philharmonic Orchestra, and discussed in an 8 February 2022 documentary. University of Edinburgh postdoctoral research fellow Phil Alexander, who is funded to study Hirshow's life and works as part of the initiative, has said of him "His music and his musical life kind of straddles east and west."

A number of his musical manuscripts and other papers, donated by his granddaughter, are held at the Scottish Jewish Archives Centre. His handwritten notebooks are in the National Library of Israel.

A memorial plaque to Hirshow is displayed in the main hallway at Garnethill Synagogue. It is modelled on his headstone.

The University of Edinburgh have a short film about Hirshow in their Points of Arrival series.

== Works ==
- The Hope of Israel 1938 (cantata for solo voices, chorus and chamber orchestra; 25 minutes)
  - A version for voices and two pianos, arranged by Frederick Frayling-Kelly, was commissioned in 1960.
