= Oldest synagogues in the United Kingdom =

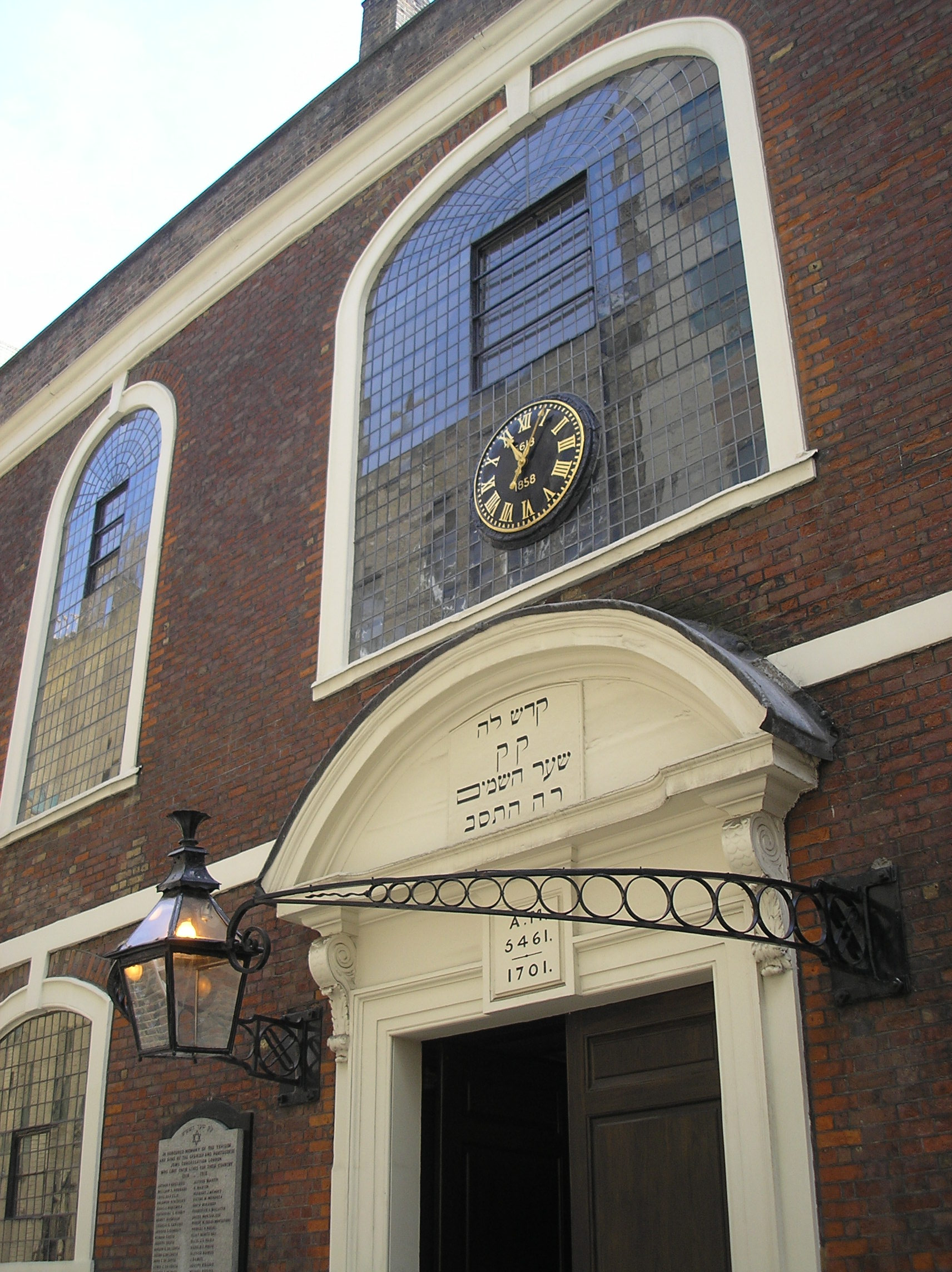
Bevis Marks Synagogue in London, built in 1701

Synagogues may be considered "oldest" based on different criteria. A number of synagogues that predate the expulsion of the Jews from England have been discovered by archaeologists or by historians in buildings that have been in use for other purposes for many centuries. A second set of synagogues post-dates the legal return of Jews to England in the seventeenth century. Some synagogues have been destroyed or demolished and rebuilt on the same site, so that, while the site or congregation may be very old, the building may be modern. Still other old synagogue buildings exist, but were sold by the congregation and are now used for other purposes, some as churches or mosques, others for everything from residences to school recital halls. And some very old synagogues have been in continuous use as synagogues for many centuries.

== England ==
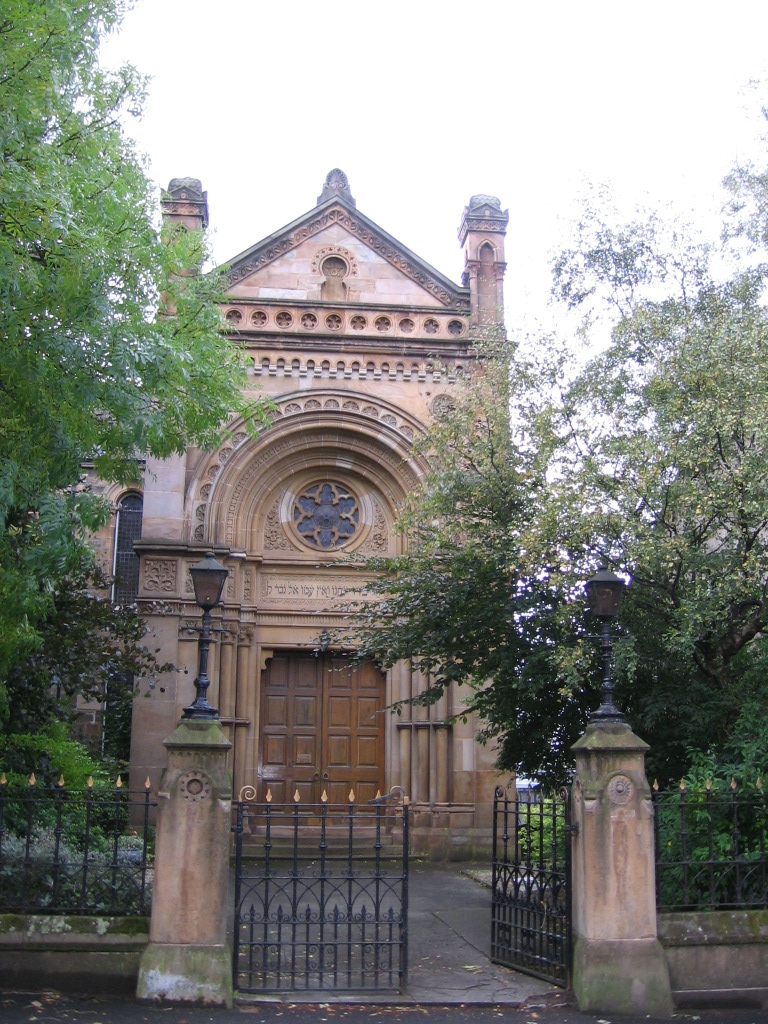
Garnethill Synagogue in Glasgow, Scotland

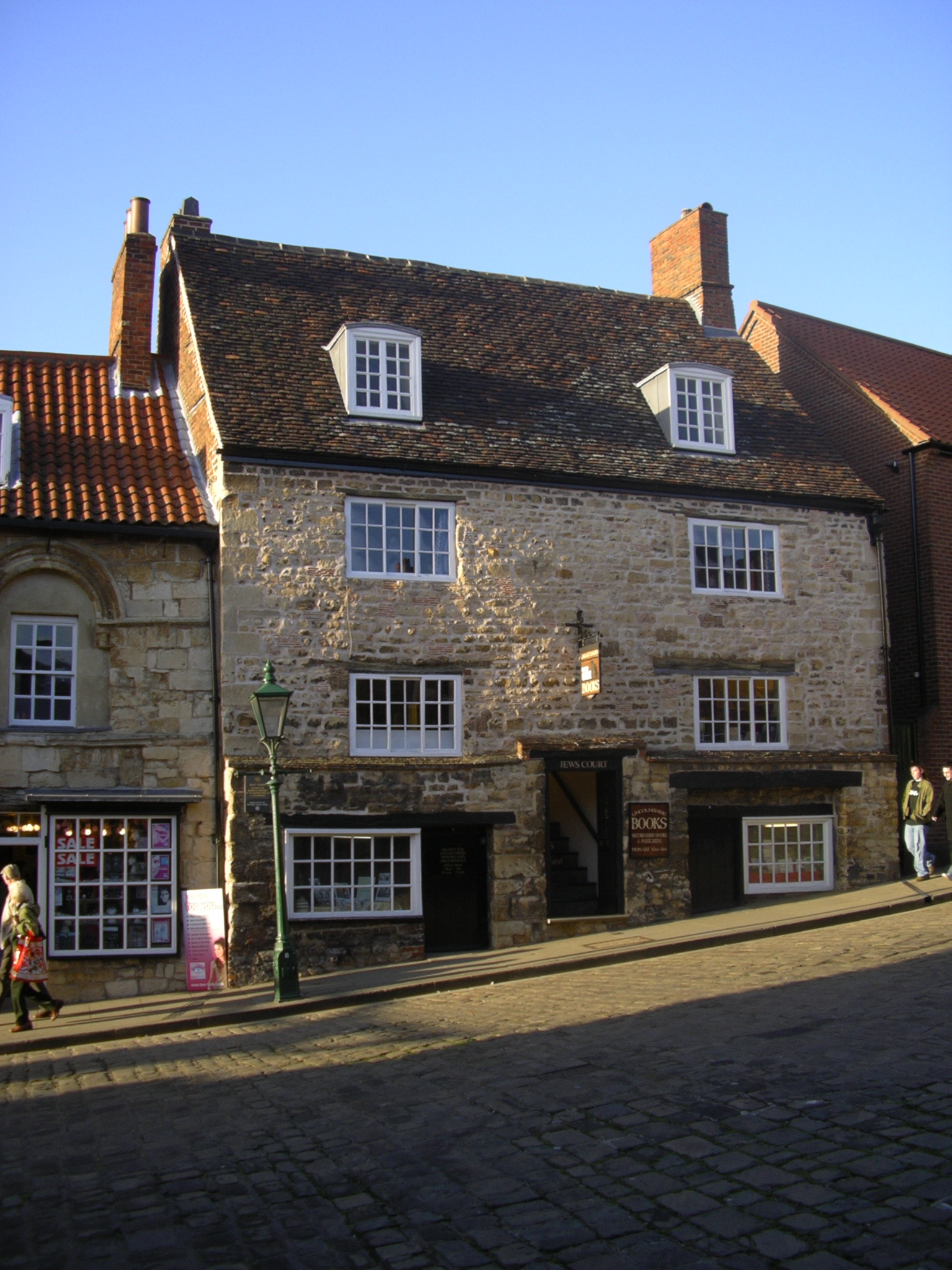
Frontage of Jews' Court, Lincoln

- Jews' Court, Lincoln, built between 1150 and 1180. A recent architectural survey of the existing building has shown that there is very little medieval stonework above basement level in the existing building. Documentary evidence of 1290 when the Jewish community of Lincoln were expelled now shows that the Jews' Court has always been divided into two houses. A charter of 1316 mentions that a Jewish scola or synagogue had stood to the west in the tenement behind these two houses. Since 1992 The 'Lincolnshire Jewish Community' has held its services here.
- Guildford Synagogue, built around 1180.
- Great Synagogue of London was built about 1690 and destroyed during the Blitz on the night of 10/11 May 1941.
- Bevis Marks Synagogue in London, built in 1701 is the oldest synagogue building in the United Kingdom in continuous use.
- The Plymouth Synagogue, built in 1762, is the oldest Ashkenazi synagogue building in the English-speaking world.
- The Exeter Synagogue, built in 1763 originally for a Sephardic Congregation.
- The Falmouth Synagogue, built in 1806, now inactive
- Bayswater Synagogue, built in 1863, was demolished in 1965.
- Chatham Memorial Synagogue, built in 1867
- West London Synagogue, built in 1870
- Princes Road Synagogue, Liverpool, built in 1872-1874
- New West End Synagogue, built in 1877–1879

== Northern Ireland ==
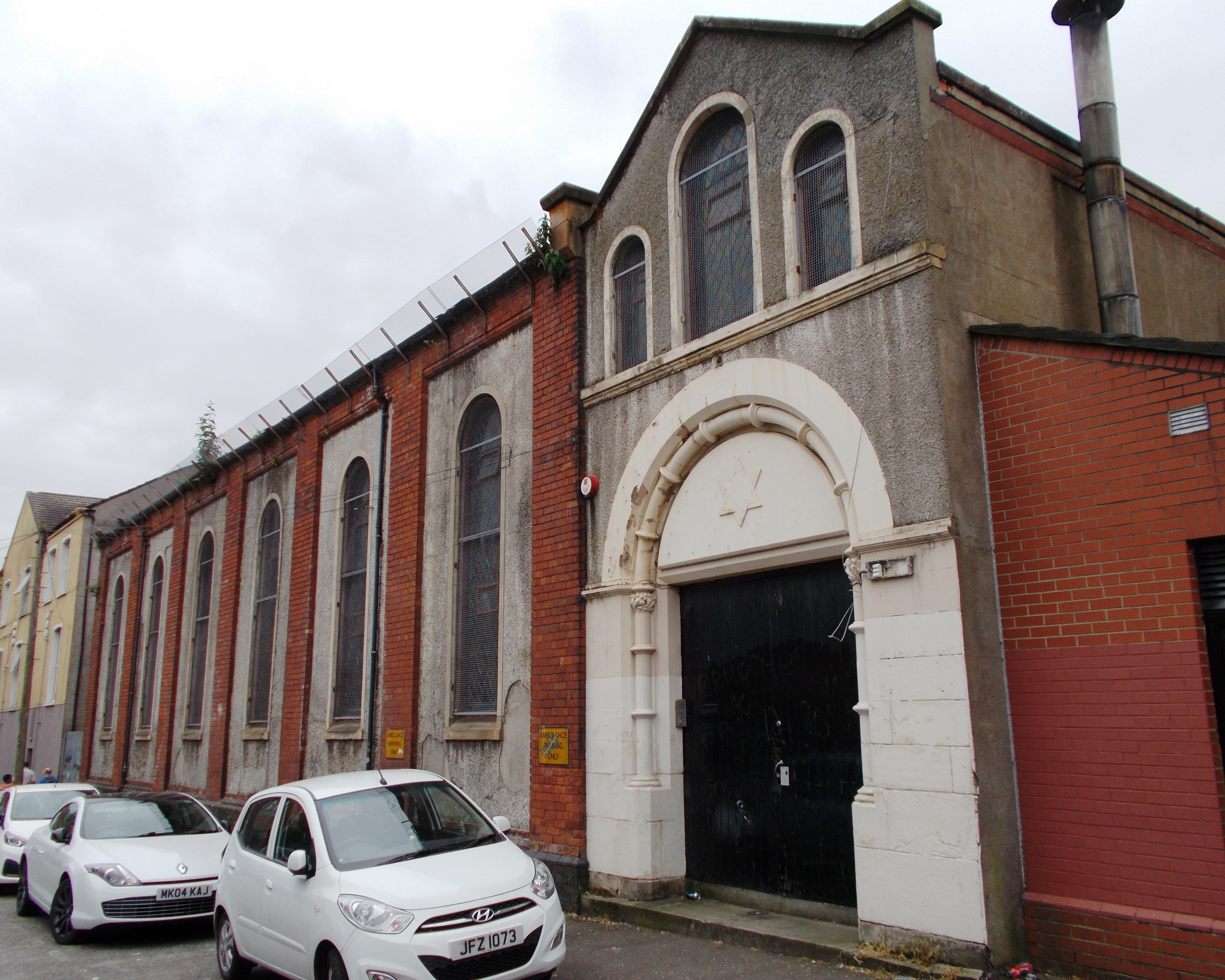
1904 synagogue on Annesley Street, Belfast

- Synagogue established by Daniel Jaffe on Great Victoria Street, Belfast, built 1870; first synagogue established in what was to become Northern Ireland
- Annesley Street Synagogue, Belfast, built in 1904, closed 1965; oldest surviving synagogue in Northern Ireland

== Scotland ==
- Garnethill Synagogue, built 1879–1881

== Wales ==
The Merthyr Synagogue (1872) in Merthyr Tydfil, Wales, is thought to be the oldest purpose-built synagogue still standing in Wales.

== See also ==
- Oldest synagogues in the world
- Oldest synagogues in Canada
- Oldest synagogues in the United States
