= South Portland Street Synagogue =

Former synagogue in Glasgow, Scotland

- Approximate location of the former synagogue in Scotland

Religion
- Affiliation: Orthodox Judaism (former)
- Rite: Nusach Ashkenaz
- Ecclesiastical or organizational status: Synagogue (1901–1974)
- Status: Closed and demolished

Location
- Location: 85–89 South Portland Street, Gorbals, Glasgow, Scotland
- Country: United Kingdom
- Interactive map of South Portland Street Synagogue
- Coordinates: 55°51′14″N 4°15′23″W

Architecture
- Architect: James Chalmers
- Type: Synagogue architecture
- Style: Moorish Revival
- Established: 1881 (as a congregation)
- Completed: 1901
- Demolished: 1974

South Portland Street Synagogue was a former Orthodox Jewish synagogue, that was at 85-89 South Portland Street in the Gorbals area of Glasgow, Scotland, in the United Kingdom.

From its establishment in 1901 until its closure in 1974, it was regarded as the centre of Jewish religious in Glasgow. The building, designed by James Chalmers, was known by several names during its lifespan including the South Side Synagogue, the Great Synagogue and the Great Central Synagogue.

== History ==
On opening in 1901, the religious leaders of the congregation were Reverend Abraham Cantor and Reverend Isaac Bridge. At the time of opening, South Portland Street was the largest synagogue in Scotland, with seating for 1,000 people and the option for up to 1,600 people to access services in the Prayer Hall with the opening of folding doors.

The synagogue was in a union with Garnethill Synagogue from 1886/7 to 1898 and from 1896 until 1906 was part of the United Synagogue of Glasgow. In 1956, the building merged with the congregation of the New Central Synagogue in Hospital Street to form the Great Central Synagogue.

In the first decade of the 20th century the South Portland Street Synagogue purchased and operated a burial ground at Riddrie, immediately adjoining Riddrie Park Cemetery.

The synagogue was the longest-surviving synagogue in the Gorbals and was considered to be the last Jewish building in the area, and was the centre of traditional Jewish life until it closed in 1974.

== Congregation ==
The congregation, who worshipped in the Ashkenazi rite, was formed in 1881 in response to the large numbers of Jewish immigrants who were moving to the Gorbals area. As a result of this immigration, a number of synagogues were established in the Gorbals, of which South Portland Street was the largest.

== See also ==
- List of former synagogues in the United Kingdom
- List of Jewish communities in the United Kingdom
- History of the Jews in Scotland
