= St Petersburgh Place =

Street in Bayswater, London

Coordinates: 51.51126°N 0.19063°W

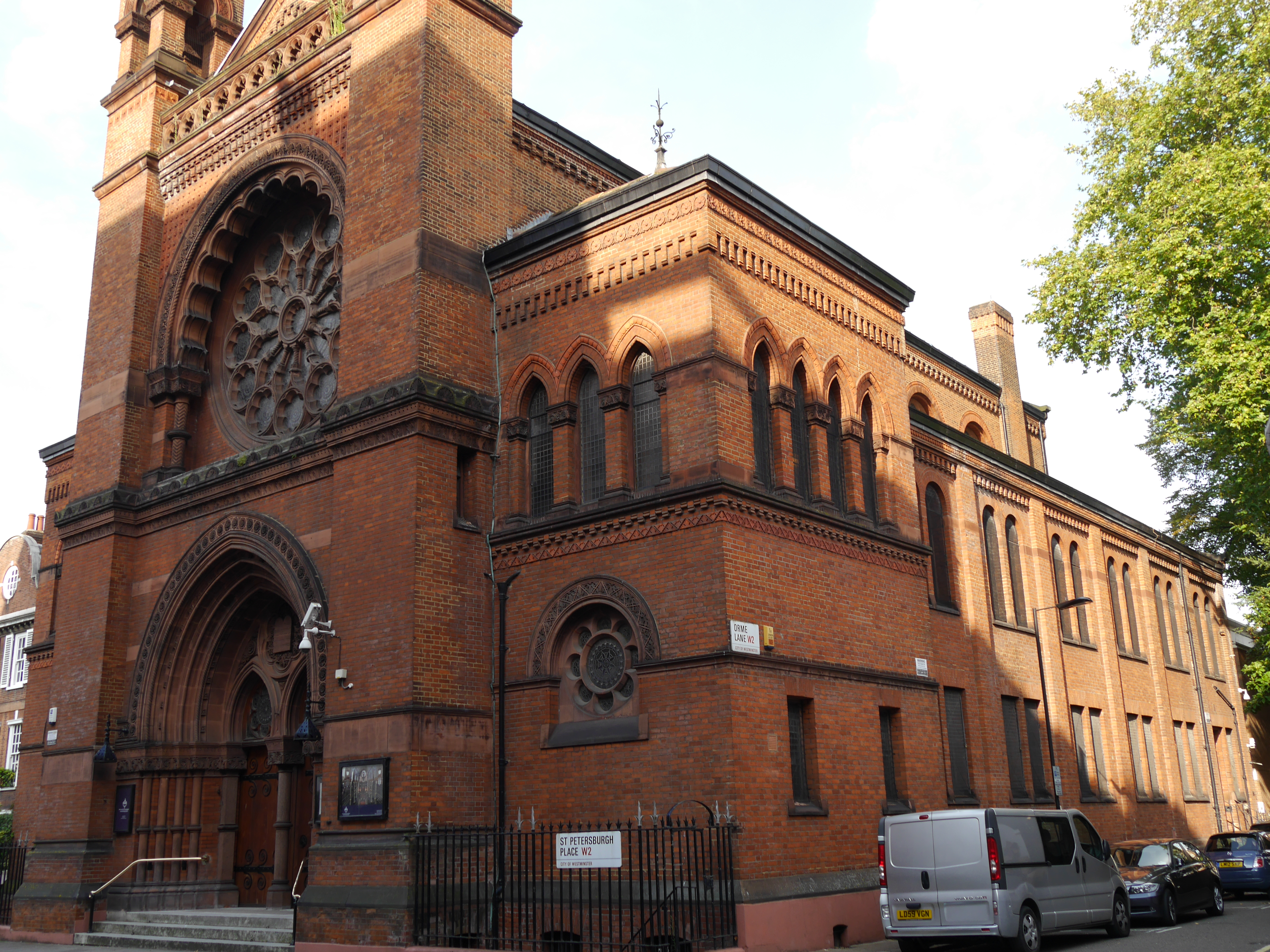
New West End Synagogue

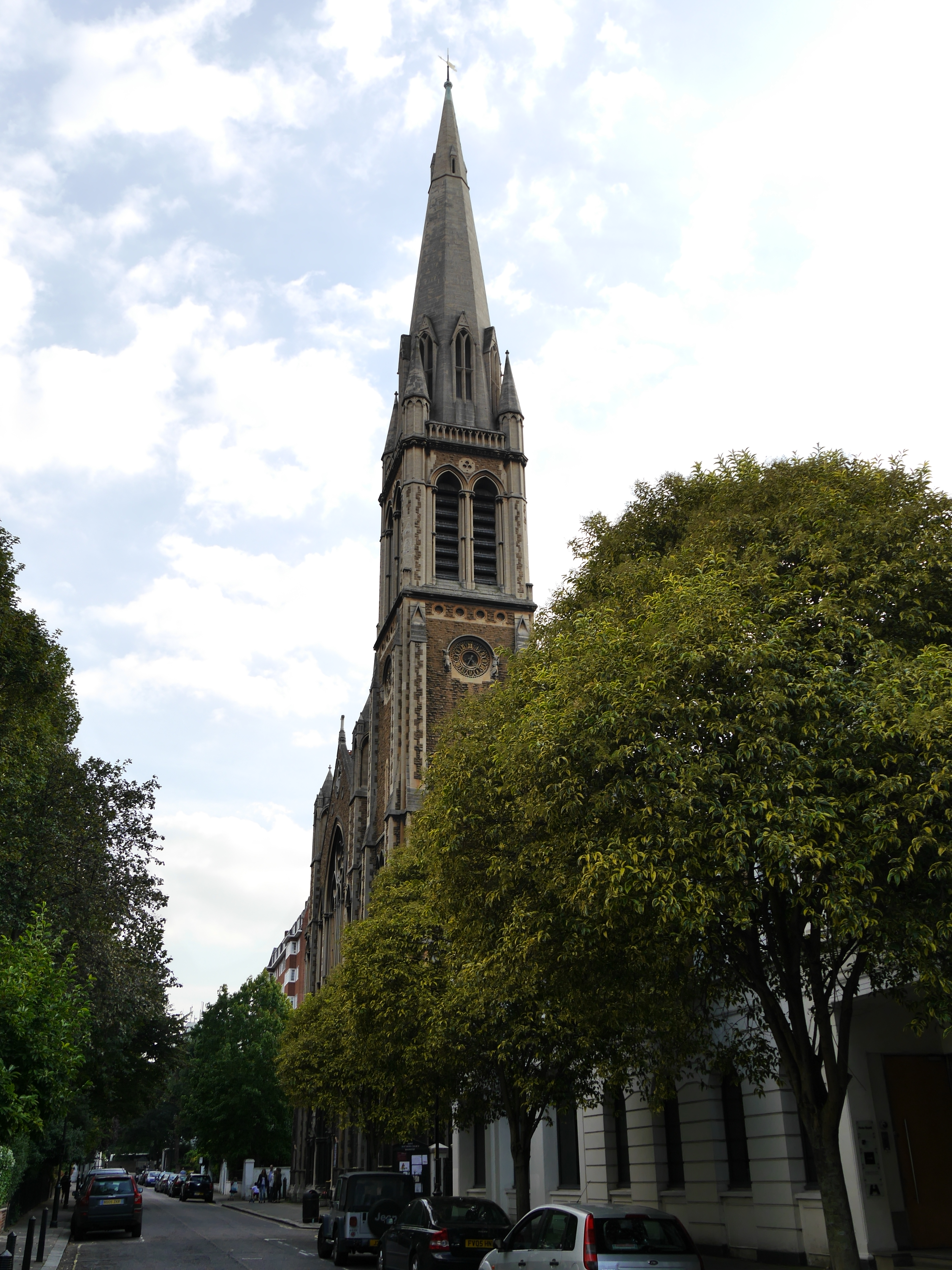
St Matthew's, Bayswater

St Petersburgh Place is a street in the Bayswater area of London, located in the City of Westminster. It runs north to south from Moscow Road to Bayswater Road, close to the northwestern entrance to Kensington Gardens. It was constructed by the property developer and painter Edward Orme during the Regency. As with Moscow Road its name commemorates the visit of Alexander I of Russia to London in 1814 as part of the Allied celebrations following the victory in the Napoleonic Wars. It was originally known simply as Petersburgh Place, but this was later changed to St Petersburgh Place, an alternative spelling of Saint Petersburg, the then-capital of the Russian Empire. In 1818 Orme constructed a Bayswater Chapel for the growing number of inhabitants. From 1823 to 1826 Orme also developed the nearby Orme Square. Adjacent to the street is the smaller St Petersburgh Mews, which runs parallel northwards to Moscow Road.

St Petersburgh Place is noted for its two places of worship, the Anglican parish church of St Matthew's, Bayswater, and the Jewish New West End Synagogue, both of which are listed buildings. The street also features Lancaster Close, a 1920s Art Deco apartment block.

Unlike Rue de Saint-Pétersbourg in Paris, St Petersburgh Place and Mews both kept their names throughout the twentieth century when the Russian city's name changed in 1914, 1924, and 1991.

== Bibliography ==
- Cockburn, J. S., King, H. P. F. & McDonnell, K. G. T. & A History of the County of Middlesex. Institute of Historical Research, 1989.
- Mills, David Anthony. A Dictionary of London Place Names. Oxford University Press, 2010.
