= Congregationalist Cemetery, Ponsharden =

Cemetery in Cornwall, England

Coordinates: 50.1639°N 5.0899°W

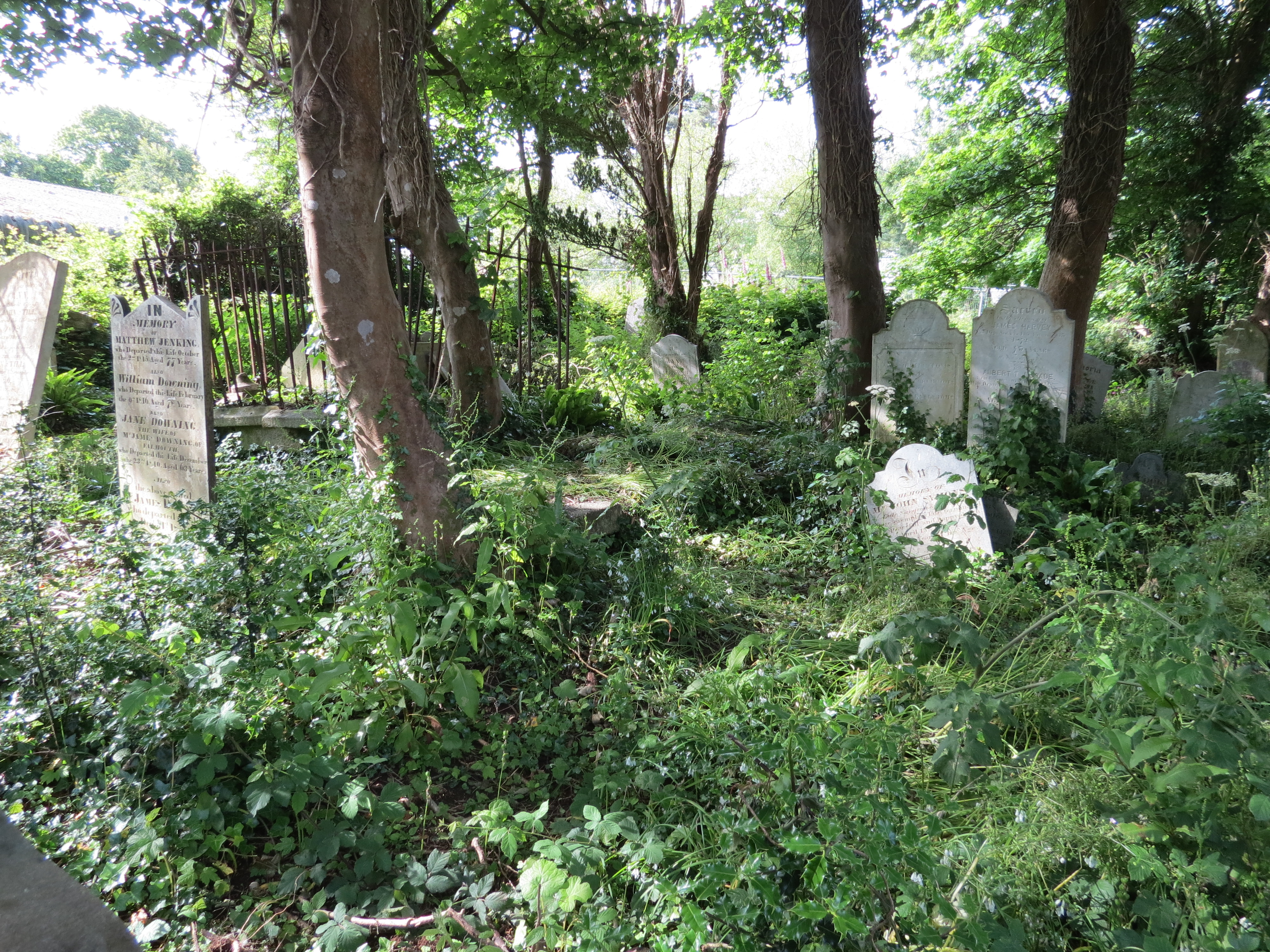
A view of the cemetery in 2012, before restoration work commenced

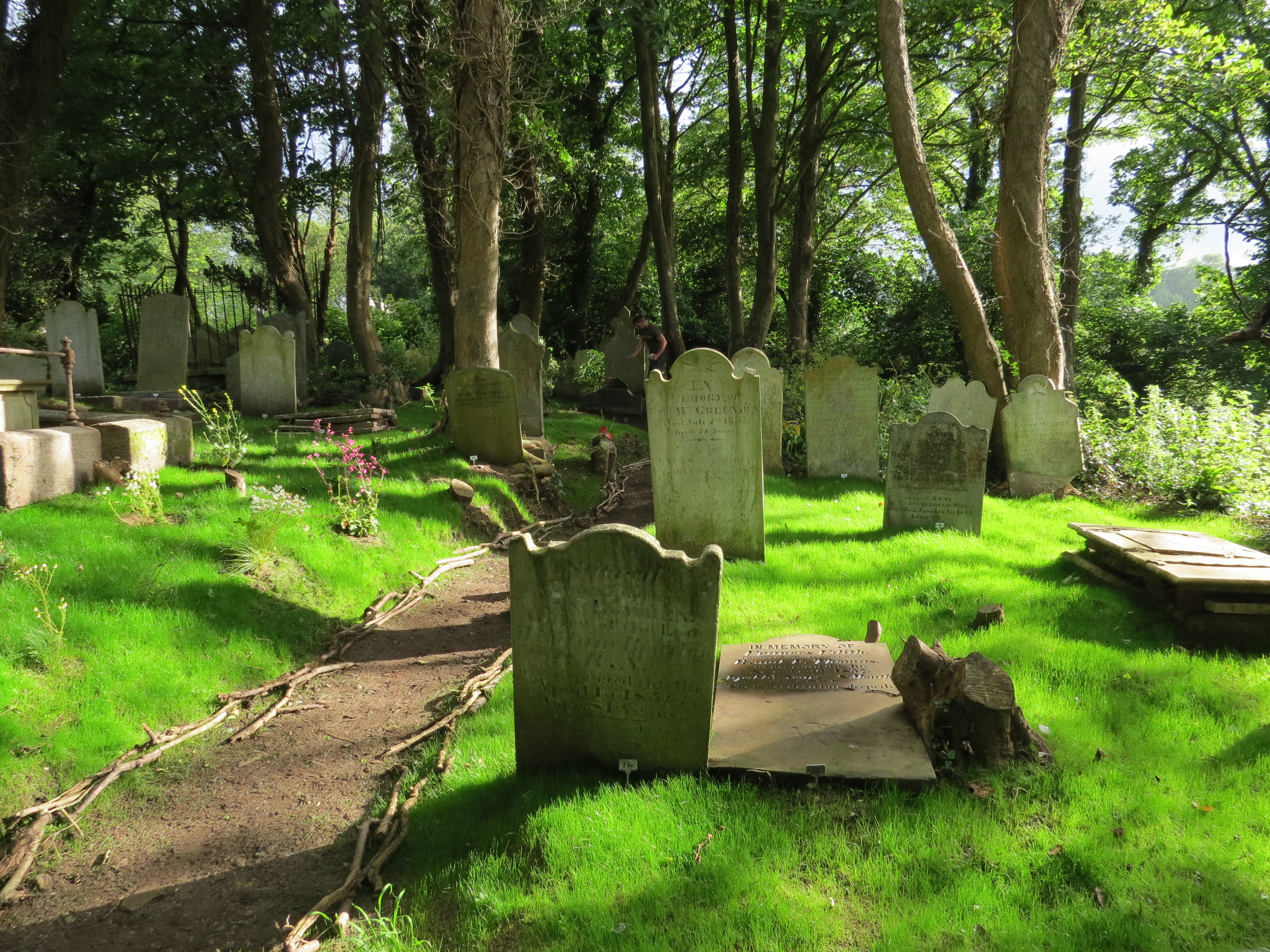
A section of cemetery seen in summer 2012 after tidying

The Congregationalist Cemetery (also known as the "Independent Burial Ground" or the "Dissenters Burying Ground") at Ponsharden, Cornwall was opened in 1808 to serve the Dissenting Christian congregations of Falmouth and Penryn. It received approximately 587 burials over a period of 120 years, before being abandoned in the 1930s. During the 20th century the site experienced significant neglect and extensive vandalism. In May 2012 a volunteer group began to restore the burial ground which (combined with an adjacent Jewish cemetery) is now a protected Scheduled Monument of national importance. The place-name Ponsharden is recorded in 1677 as "Ponshardy"; its meaning is Hardy's bridge.

== Location and setting ==
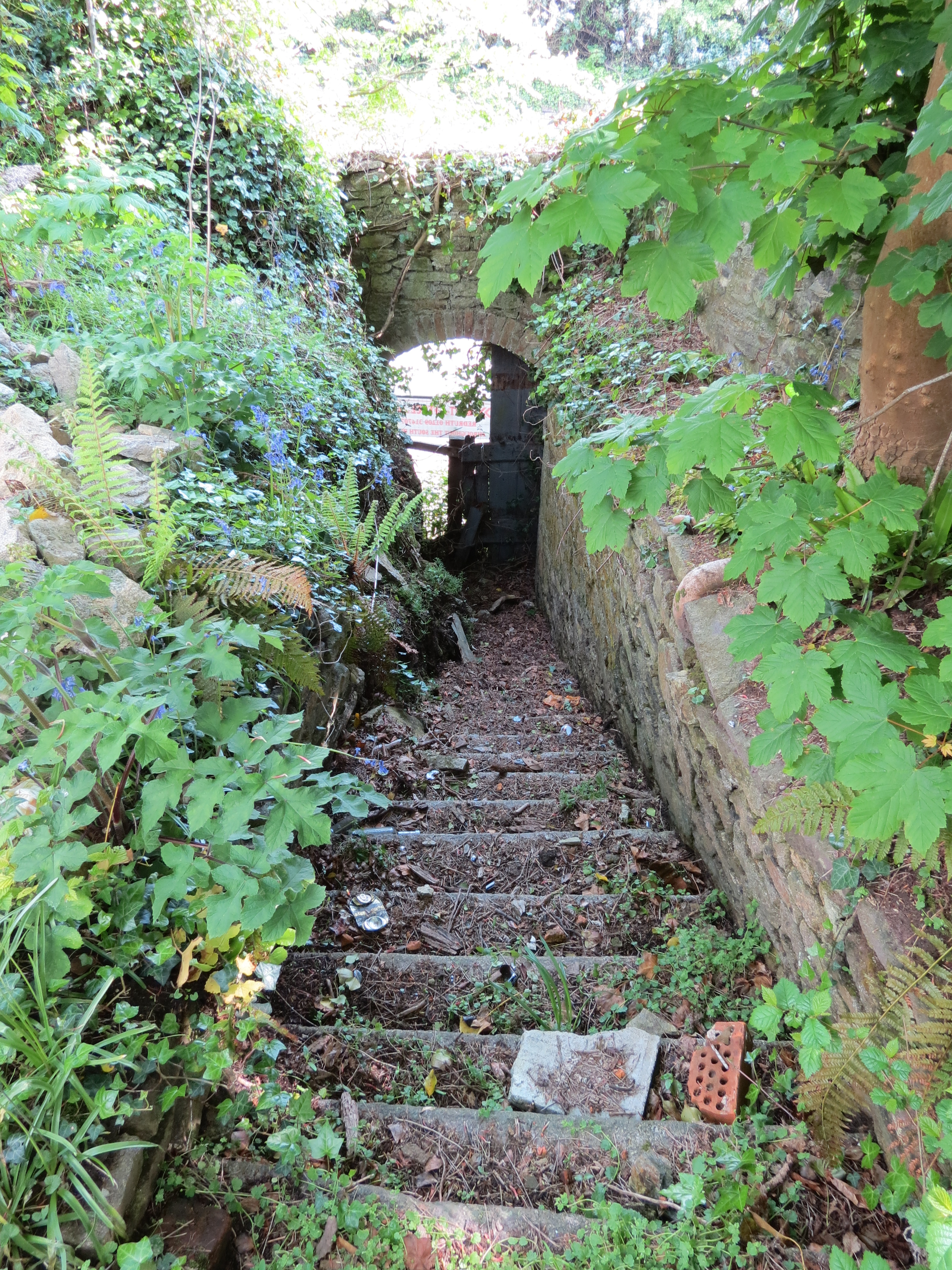
The cemetery's tunnel-like entrance, constructed in 1827 through donations from the Dissenting congregations of Falmouth and Penryn

The Congregationalist cemetery is located at Ponsharden, between the towns of Falmouth and Penryn on the south coast of Cornwall. The cemetery sits at the lower end of a small spur of land which runs down to the Penryn River (a branch of the Fal estuary). The site is bounded on the north by the A39 Falmouth Road, to the east by light industrial units, to the south by open ground and to the west by a cleared industrial site.

== Site layout and features ==
The cemetery is roughly L-shaped in plan and occupies an area of approximately 0.22 acres (913m²). The cemetery's northern end comprises a steep scarp overlooking the A39 Falmouth Road. Into this embankment is set the site's original entrance, formed from an arched gateway with cut granite steps. At the top of these steps are the remains of a badly vandalised mortuary building. The site's eastern boundary comprises a damaged but well-constructed rubble wall with chamfered granite copings. The southern and western boundaries are formed from hedge banks. Within the cemetery are the remains of 91 monuments of considerable diversity and several unmarked burial mounds. From the top of the entrance steps, a path (with traces of edging in-situ) extends through the centre of the burial ground, terminating at the southern boundary. A number of mature, self-sown sycamore trees are scattered across the site and a single yew tree stands at the cemetery's southern end, its traditional association with sorrow and death indicating it is a deliberate ornamental feature.

== History ==
=== Opening of cemetery ===
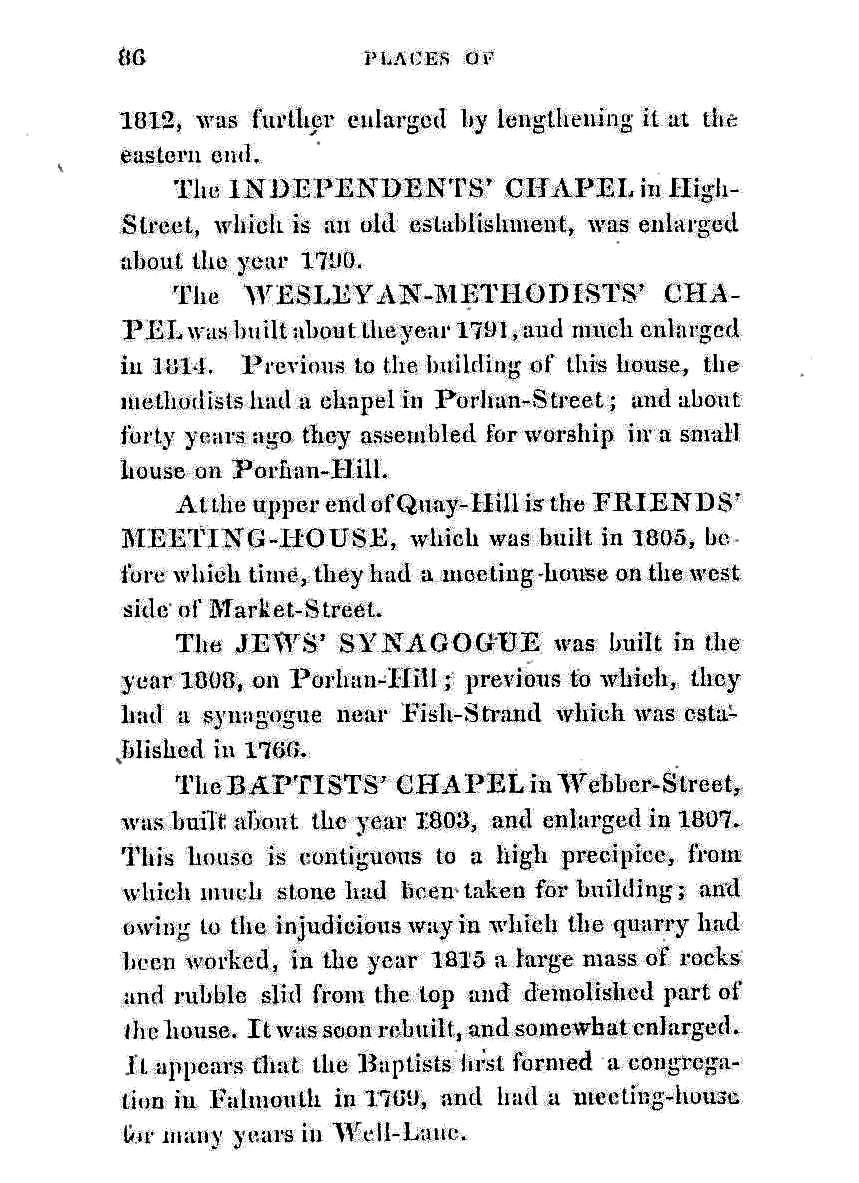
Some of Falmouth's diverse religious groups seen listed in a guidebook from 1827

From the late 17th century Falmouth (and to a lesser extent Penryn) supported a significant number of nonconformist religious groups, including Congregationalists (also known as Independents), Methodists, Baptists, Presbyterians and Quakers. A significant Jewish population could also be found in the town. Dissenting Christian congregations often had their own place of worship, but unless they owned a private burial ground they were usually buried in the local parish churchyard (often in unconsecrated ground).

The Dissenters of Falmouth and Penryn acquired their first (and only) dedicated burial ground in early 1808, when they were given a plot of land at Ponsharden ‘through the kindness and liberality of Mr Samuel Tregelles, a reputable Merchant in Falmouth’. The new burial ground stood adjacent to an older Jewish cemetery ‘in the corner of the lower field, adjoining the Turnpike Road’. It was given to the Dissenters free of cost ‘on the simple condition of the ground being enclosed by a good stone wall, to encompass the Jew’s Burial Ground’.

=== Active years ===
Falmouth and Penryn's Dissenters began using the new cemetery almost immediately after enclosing it in the summer of 1808. The first of Penryn's congregation to be buried was Abia, the daughter of John and Dolly Nicholls of Gwennap. Abia died on 18 August 1808 and was buried ‘amid a vast concourse which had filled the Ground from the novelty of a Burial amongst Dissenters’ (over 700 people attended the funeral). Falmouth's first burial was that of Mrs Christiana Daubuz ‘a Lady of eminent piety & one of the chief supporters of the Independent Chapel’ who in November 1808 was interred ‘amid a very large concourse of persons'. The cemetery's burial registers have mostly survived, although the entries are incomplete between the years 1880–1893 and 1906–1935. The volumes offer valuable information on the intensity of use that the cemetery experienced, as follows:

Period	Burials
1808–1819	55
1820–1829	66
1830–1839	68
1840–1849	93
1850–1859	79
1860–1869	81
1870–1879	68
1880–1889	10
1890–1899	11
1900–1905	12

This gives a total of 543 recorded burials. However, there are an additional 22 headstones at the cemetery representing names that do not appear in the official registers. These unlisted burials, combined with the above registers, give a total figure of circa 587 interments on site, of which approximately 382 lie in unmarked graves.

=== Decline and neglect ===
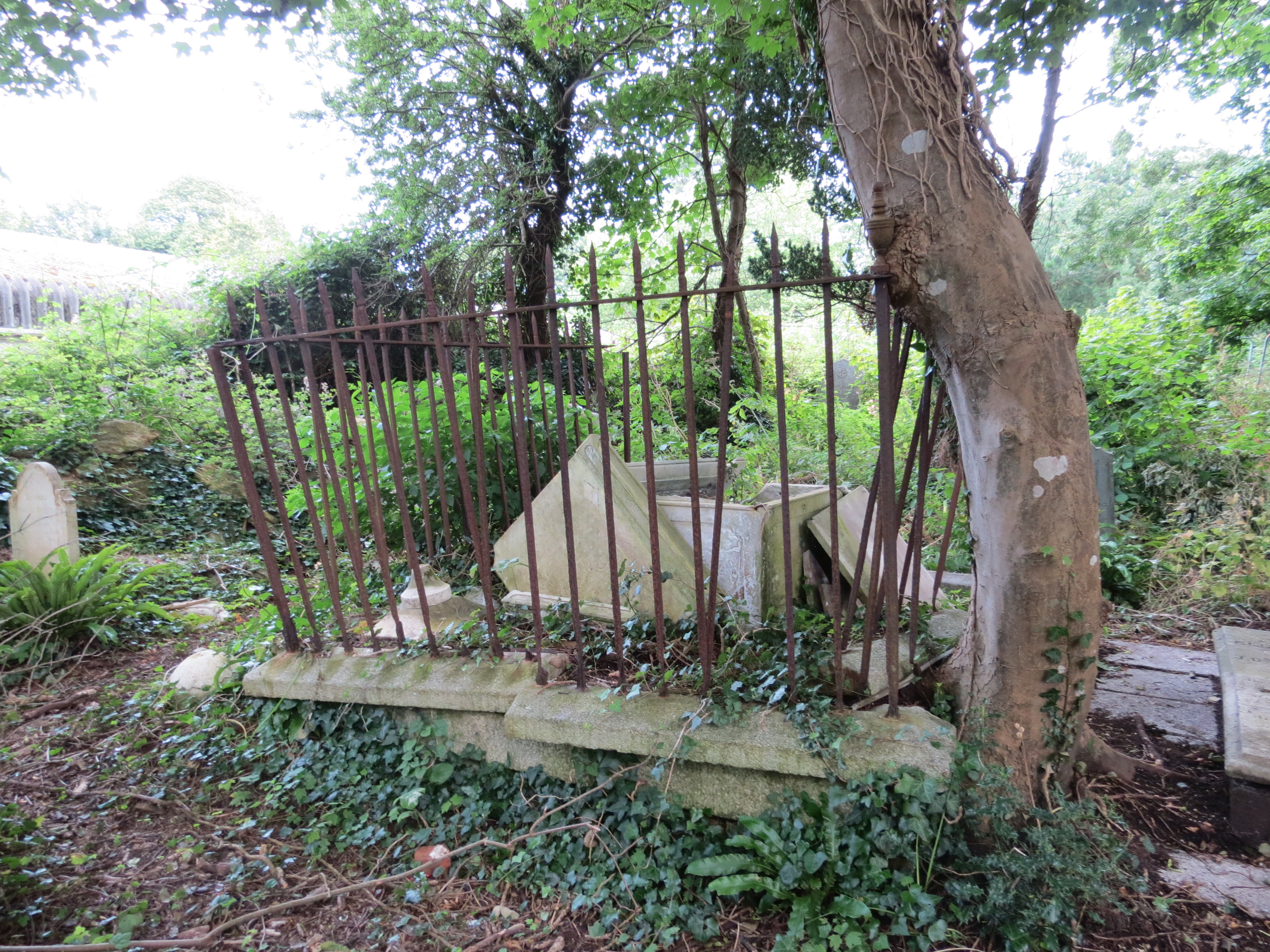
The vandalised Glasson family vault, which has been almost entirely destroyed

There are no existing records to indicate that the Congregationalist cemetery was ever officially closed, and the circumstances surrounding its decline and abandonment are presently unclear. The last entry in the burial registers is dated November 1905 but existing headstones show that several interments took place after this, including that of Elizabeth Tully Cook in 1912 and four members of the Newcombe family of Penryn in the 1920s and 1930s. The latest known burial on site is that of Mary Elizabeth Newcombe, in April 1935. These late interments involved re-opening established family plots, and it appears no new ground was used during the cemetery's latter days.

The large number of burials that took place at Ponsharden might have been a factor in its closure. The cemetery is only 0.22 acres in size (913m²) and the 587 burials would have stretched its limited capacity. Additionally, in 1854 a new municipal cemetery was opened near Swanpool, Falmouth, complete with a chapel and burial area specifically set aside for Dissenters. The attraction of this spacious new site must also be considered when contemplating the Congregationalist cemetery's decline, although the Ponsharden burial registers do not start to show reduced figures until 20 years after the cemetery at Swanpool was opened.

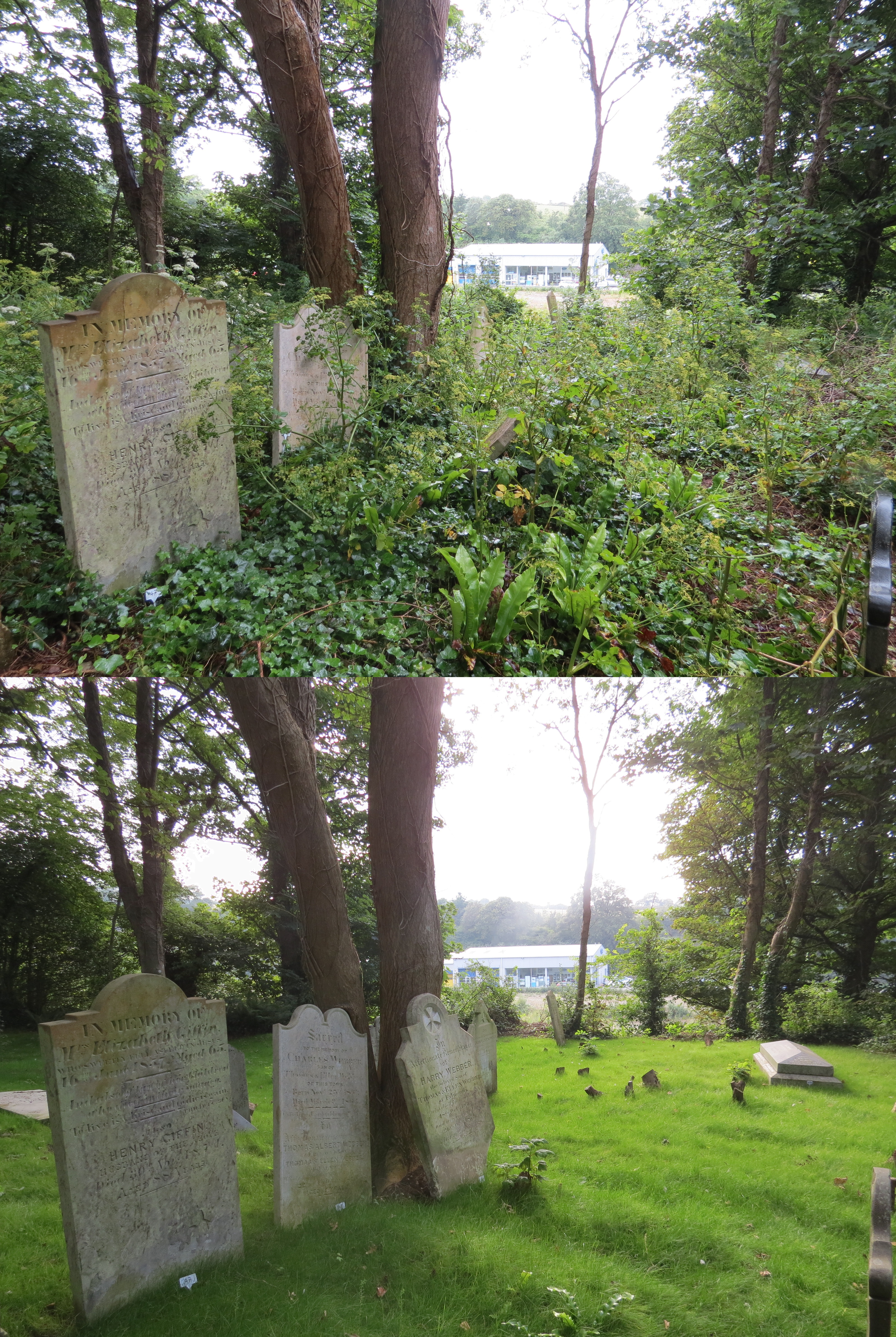
A view of the cemetery (looking west) before and after clearance work took place

Once disused, the site was left unattended for a period of almost 80 years. Gradually the cemetery was engulfed by self-sown trees, which caused extensive damage as they grew between (and through) the monuments. Dense brambles, ivy and scrub spread across the burial ground, obscuring a large number of low-lying monuments from view. The overgrown nature of the site meant it was difficult to monitor any activity taking place there, and during the 20th century it experienced extensive vandalism (at least 33 monuments were seriously damaged), which included the smashing of headstones, the deliberate destruction of family vaults, the robbing of slate and granite from monuments and the excavation of at least two graves.

=== Recent activity ===
In 2002 English Heritage recognised the national importance of the Congregationalist cemetery and an older Jewish burial ground which adjoins it, and both sites were designated a single Scheduled Monument (English Heritage Ref No.15581). A Cornwall Council Archaeological Report of 2010 summarised the importance of the cemeteries, stating that "their time spans, rare features, group value, siting, varied evidence of past religious, social and economic life, complexity and natural diversity combine to make them highly significant". However, the report also noted that 'the condition of the Congregationalist's site is very poor and deteriorating, and indeed can be described as deplorable. The cemetery has many interrelated active and potential risks, affecting highly sensitive and unrecorded graves and associated features'.

In May 2012 Falmouth Town Council and English Heritage granted permission for a volunteer group to clear the scrub from the cemetery and undertake a survey of all the surviving monuments (see Site Survey, below). In parallel with the survey, the volunteers also reseeded the site with grass, and efforts were made to re-establish the few examples of native flora (such as the Early Purple Orchid) that had survived amongst the dense brambles and ivy.

In 2013 the volunteers were granted custodianship of the graveyard. Presently, their responsibilities include stabilising its decline, regular tidying and gardening and raising local and national awareness of the cemetery's existence. The volunteers' long-term objectives include raising funds to repair the damaged monuments, entrance-way and boundary walls, as well as officially opening the cemetery as a historic landmark.

== Site survey (2012–2013) ==
Until 2012, minimal information existed about the site in terms of burial figures, the quantity of surviving headstones, the families they represent and an understanding of the congregations that utilised the cemetery. Cornwall Council's archaeological report of 2010 highlighted that many of the monuments were deteriorating so rapidly there was a risk the inscriptions would be irretrievably lost before any record of them had been made. However, decades of neglect meant that survey work would be hampered by the invasive vegetation that blanketed the site. It was noted that if an accurate study was to be made, the cemetery would first require methodical clearance by hand to expose the numerous fallen, low-lying or obscured headstones and tombs.

In May 2012 residents of Falmouth formed a volunteer group and approached Falmouth Town Council and English Heritage with the proposal to tidy the site and undertake the urgently required survey. As the cemetery is protected, the works required Scheduled Monument Consent from the Secretary of State. Permission was granted, and between May 2012 and August 2013 the site was completely cleared and a record made of the quantity, style, dimensions and condition of every existing monument, complete with a full transcription of all surviving monumental inscriptions.

The survey represented the most detailed examination of the cemetery to date. Whilst its results have established definitive statistics regarding the quantity, style and condition of surviving monuments, its demographic findings only cover those persons whose names are listed on surviving monuments (202 people), meaning that little is still known about the cemetery's 380+ unmarked graves.

=== Existing monuments ===
The survey recorded a total of 91 monuments surviving at the cemetery, representing a diverse range of styles from simple slate headstones to ornate vaults with iron railings and stone urns. They record the lives of 202 people (approximately 34% of the total burials registered at Ponsharden) which indicates that the ground contains approximately 383 unmarked graves.

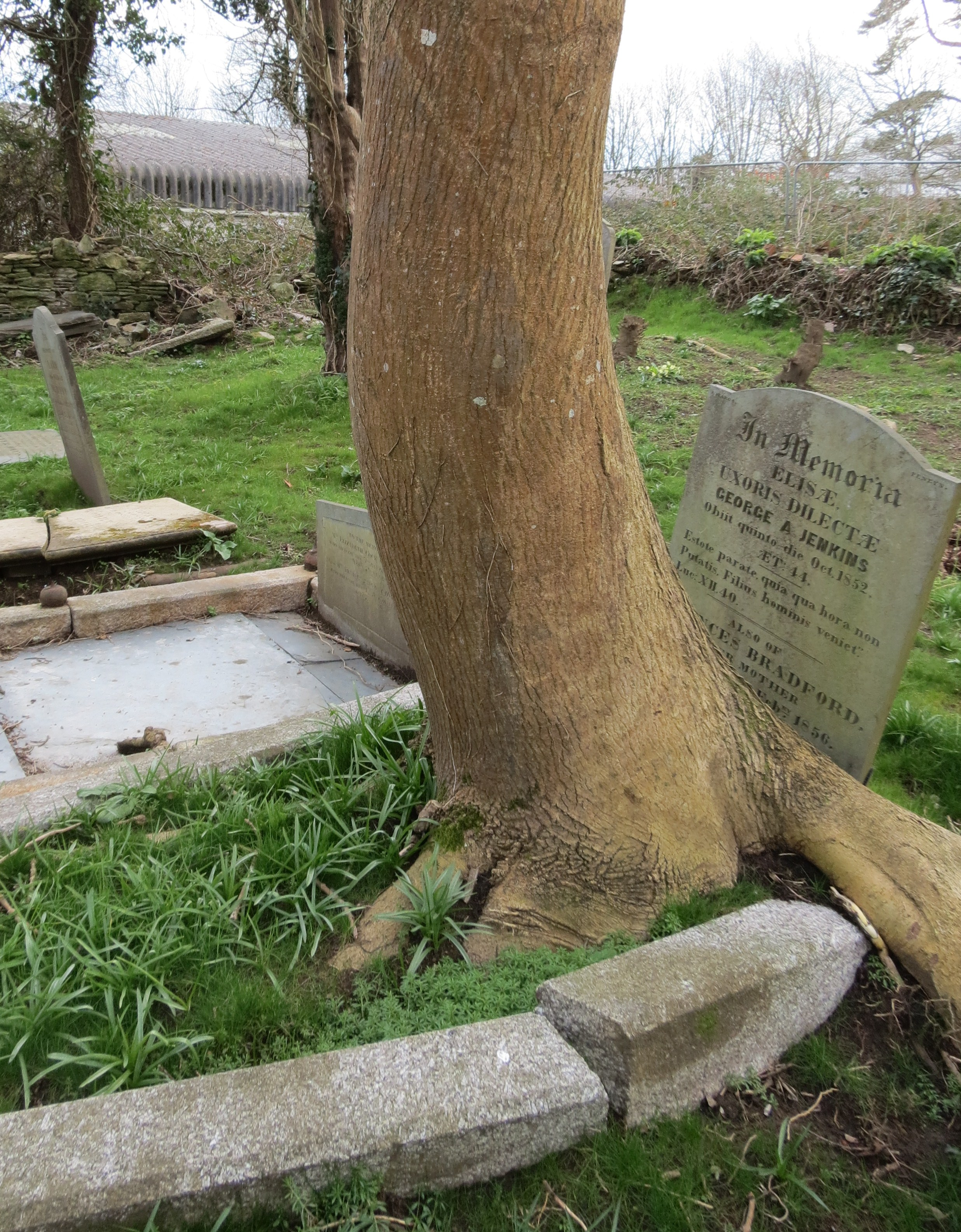
A self-sown tree gradually destroying one of the graves at Ponsharden

The monuments survive in varied conditions:

- 7 are displaced, and their original location unknown
- 11 have inscriptions that are badly weathered
- 33 have been damaged by deliberate acts of vandalism
- 17 have been (or are still being) damaged by self-sown trees

In terms of monument types there are:

- 57 headstones (with no additional features)
- 19 headstones combined with some form of grave lining/capping
- 9 ledger or raised (chamfered) tombs
- 4 pedestal tombs/vaults
- 2 unknown monumental forms (due to vandalism)

The following stone types were recorded:

- Limestone (44 monuments)
- Slate (29 monuments)
- Sandstone (10 monuments)
- Granite (6 monuments)
- 2 monuments have had been totally destroyed, leaving a footprint in the ground but nothing else. It is therefore not possible to establish the original stone type used

Twenty-nine monuments are inscribed with the name of the mason who erected them, most of whom were members of the congregation and are also buried on site. The majority (80%) of the monuments represent people who either lived or died in Falmouth. The residents of Penryn are only commemorated on 16% of the headstones, despite the cemetery being used by the congregations of both towns. Existing burial registers indicate that the majority of Penryn's residents lie in unmarked graves. A further 4% of monuments are linked to persons who died elsewhere, such as Budock, Mylor or Flushing.

=== Demography ===
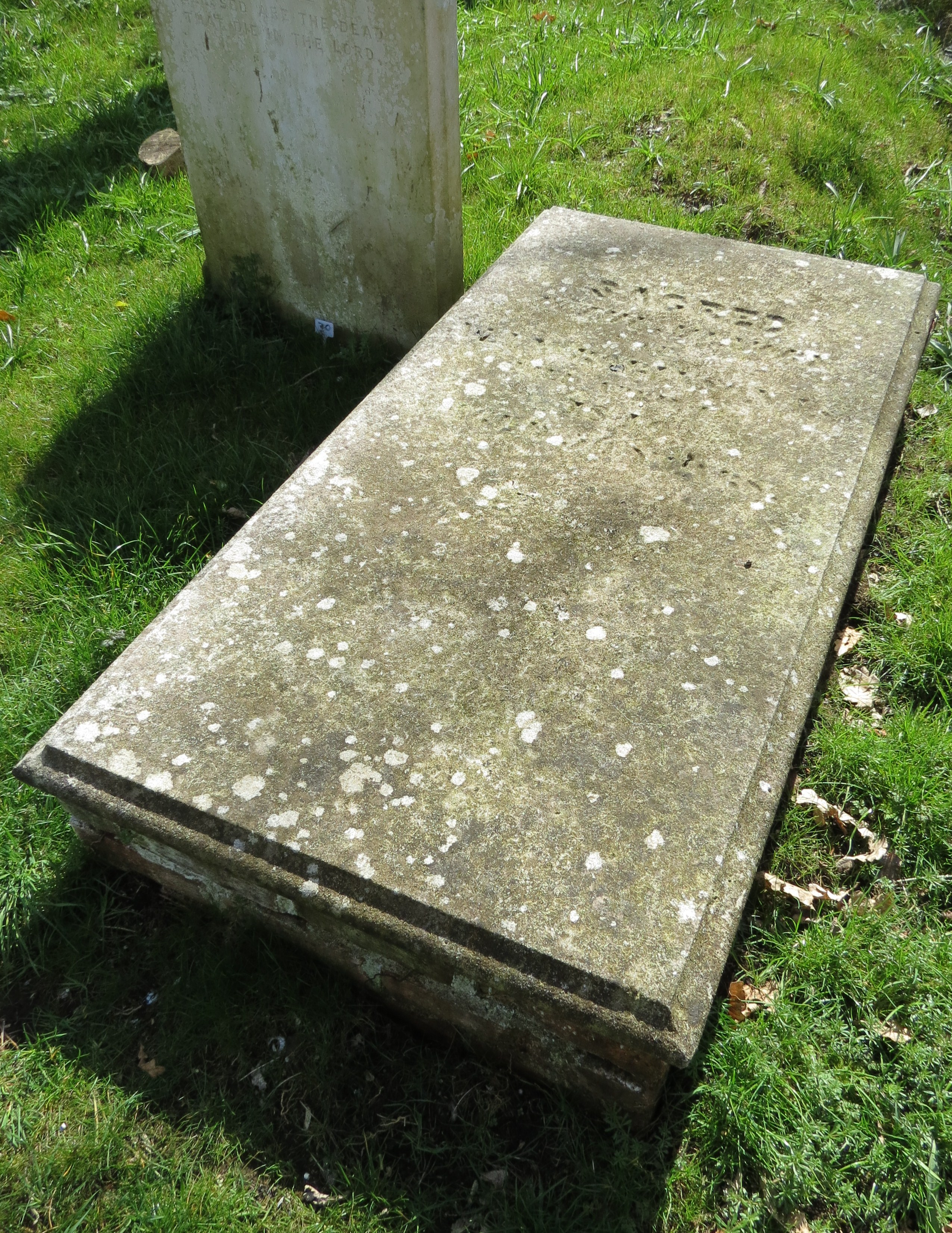
The vault of Alexander Robinson, Wine Merchant of Regent St, London

The data collected during the survey is still being processed, and current information only covers the place of birth and professions of those persons listed on the monuments. The volunteers have stated that data relating to gender, age and cause of death will be released towards the end of 2014.

==== Birthplace ====
The survey highlighted a wide range of birthplaces, a direct result of the graveyard serving two busy ports (Falmouth then being a major gateway to the overseas Empire). A large number of local residents from Falmouth, Penryn and Budock are represented on site, but families from across Cornwall can also be found at Ponsharden, including those from Calstock, Crowan, Gerrans, Gorran, Grade, Illogan, Launceston, Mevagissey, Mullion, Nancarrow, Redruth, Ruan Minor, St Agnes, St Austell, St Columb, St Ives, St Keverne, Sancreed, Stithians, Talland, Wadebridge and Wendron.

The cemetery also holds the remains of many people born outside of Cornwall, including natives of Scotland and Wales as well as Devon, Dorset, Dover, Essex, Liverpool, London, Somerset, Suffolk and Wiltshire. Several of the deceased were travellers who died whilst passing through Falmouth or Penryn; Walter Morris, a Welshman, died at the Greenbank Hotel after returning from a voyage to Madeira (where he was trying to restore his health) and one vault contains the remains of Alexander Robinson, a wine merchant from Regent Street, London who died whilst in Falmouth. When Robinson's wife (also a Londoner) died twelve years later, her body was brought from the capital to Ponsharden and laid to rest alongside her husband.

==== Trades and professions ====
A broad spectrum of trades and professions were found to be represented on site, many of which reflect Ponsharden's proximity to the sea. The cemetery contains numerous mariners, including a packet ship steward, naval surgeons, master mariners and officers in the Royal Navy and the Packet, Merchant and Coastguard services. Several headstones commemorate persons whose bodies were lost, but whose deaths were linked to the sea, including William Downing who died in the mid-Atlantic and Thomas Webber, who died from Yellow Fever in Rio de Janeiro. Other marine trades represented at Ponsharden include ship owners, ship builders, ship carpenters, ropers and merchants. On site can also be found tailors and drapers, boot and shoe makers, builders and carpenters, doctors, surgeons and druggists, grocers and fruit merchants, tea and spirit dealers, a lawyer, accountant and two clerks. Whilst not a trade as such, the burial ground contains numerous affluent annuitants and house proprietors who spent their entire lives living by independent means due to legacies left in wills.

== Notable burials ==
Elizabeth Elliott (c1733–1827), who is credited with introducing the printing press to Cornwall

Captain William Kirkness (c. 1783–1852), of the Queen Charlotte packet ship

The cemetery holds the remains of many interesting and important people, including:

- William Patterson Banks (1817–1848):

Born in Scotland / Surgeon in the Royal Navy, serving aboard the H.M.S. Fearless.

- Elizabeth Tully Cook (1842–1912):

Daughter of the Reverend William Dennis, Independent Minister of Wrington / Died in a mental asylum in Wales, although her body was returned to Falmouth for burial.

- Reverend Richard Cope LL.D. (1776–1856):

Doctor of Law and Independent Minister at the New Street Chapel in Penryn.

- Dr James Cornish (1792–1868):

Doctor and Surgeon / Twice Mayor of Falmouth (1829-30 & 1836) and a dominant figure in Falmouth’s political and social circles. Cornish entertained future Prime Minister Benjamin Disraeli in 1830 and was a close friend of Barclay Fox (of the philanthropic Quaker family).

- Josiah Devonshire (1796–1872):

Builder and Surveyor to Lord Wodehouse / In 1836 (and again in 1871) Devonshire was responsible for moving and rebuilding the landmark Killigrew Pyramid which can still be seen opposite Arwenack Manor in Falmouth.

- Elizabeth Elliott (c. 1733–1827):

Printer, Bookseller and Stationer / During her industrious life, Elliott is credited with introducing the printing press to Cornwall.

- William Glasson (1781–1843):

Merchant and Ship Owner / Part funded the establishment of the Classical and Mathematical School in Falmouth in 1824.

- Captain William Green (1786–1857):

Master in the Royal Navy / Captain of the H.M.S. Crane packet ship, sailing between Falmouth and South America.

- Reverend William James (1795–1853):

Independent Minister of Portscatho Chapel, whose 'one luxury in life was conveying divine truth over the threshold of the cottager's door'.

- Captain William Kirkness (c. 1783–1852):

Captain of the Queen Charlotte packet ship, whose exploits included intentionally engaging American privateers (although outnumbered), tricking the French navy and outrunning a hurricane in St Kitts.

- John McDowell (c. 1750–1825):

Mercer and Draper / Leading figure at the Independent Church in Falmouth, holding the office of Deacon. Also Treasurer of the County Auxiliary Missionary Society

- William McDowell (1794–1849):

Cabinet Maker, Upholsterer and Auctioneer / McDowell met John Stuart Mill in Falmouth c. 1840.

- James Martin (c. 1836–1896):

Grocer and Merchant / Magistrate, Alderman and Justice of the Peace in Penryn.

- Walter Morris (c.1802–1839):

Son of eminent Welsh Calvanistic Methodist preacher Ebenezer Morris.

- Richard Newcombe (1810–1893):

Lime and coal merchant / Member of the 'Star of the West' Oddfellows Lodge and Alderman of Penryn in 1864.

- John Richards (c. 1764–1842):

Parish Clerk for Mylor, and benefactor to the London Missionary Society and Foreign Bible Society.

- Alexander Robinson (1792–1849):

Wine Merchant of 194 Regent Street, London. Died whilst in Falmouth.

- Mary Snell (c.1779–1847):

Wine and Spirit Dealer with vaults at Market Strand, Falmouth.

- Alfred Sidney Stephens (1818–1887):

Draper / Alderman and later Mayor of Penryn in 1867.

- John Still (1807–1880):

‘Boot and Shoe Maker to his Majesty'.

- John Symons (c.1770–1837):

‘Surgeon and Druggist' of Penryn. Contributed funds towards the building of a wall around the cemetery.

- Samuel Tresidder (1793–1873):

Builder and Surveyor / Responsible for the construction of many of Falmouth's houses in the mid-19th century and Superintendent of the Congregationalist Sunday School in Falmouth.

- Dr James Trevosso (1764–1830):

Doctor and Surgeon / Trevosso provided free medical care to the disadvantaged through his voluntary efforts at Falmouth's Public Dispensary, founded 1806.
