= Garnethill Synagogue =

Orthodox synagogue in Glagow, Scotland

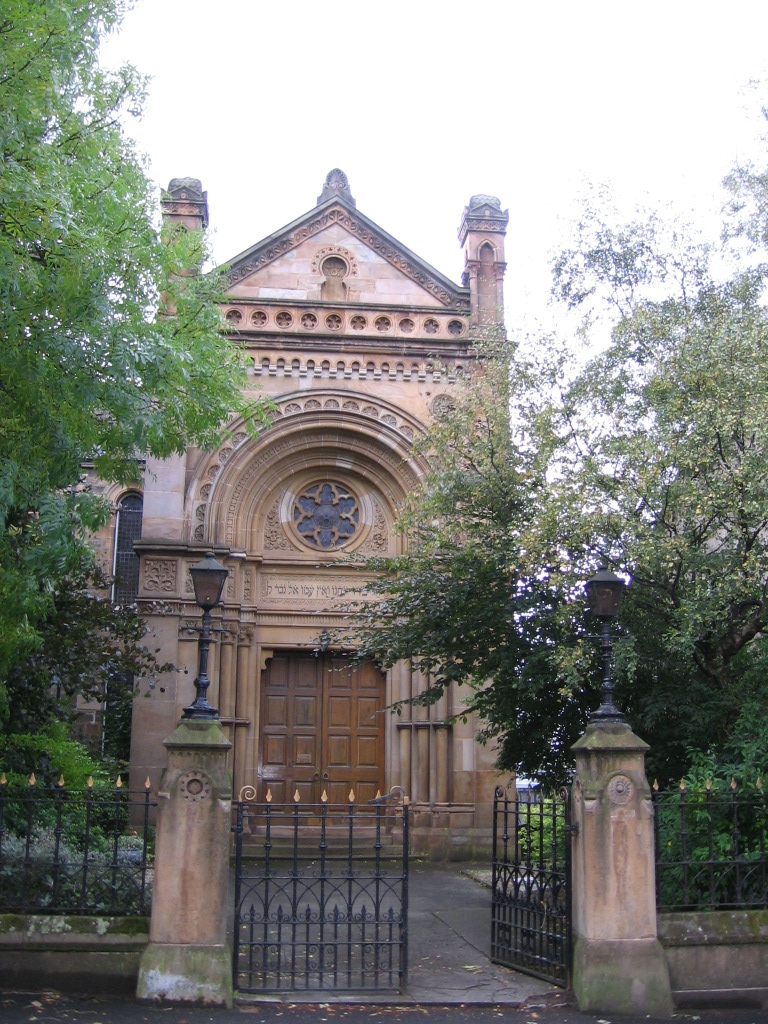
- Garnethill Synagogue in 2005

- Location of the synagogue in Scotland

Religion
- Affiliation: Orthodox Judaism
- Rite: Nusach Ashkenaz
- Ecclesiastical or organizational status: Synagogue
- Status: Active

Location
- Location: 129 Hill Street, Garnethill, Glasgow, Scotland
- Country: United Kingdom
- Interactive map of Garnethill Synagogue
- Coordinates: 55°52′2″N 4°16′4″W

Architecture
- Architects: John McLeod; Nathan Solomon Joseph
- Type: Synagogue architecture
- Style: Romanesque Revival (exterior); Byzantine Revival (interior)
- Established: c. 1823 (as a congregation)
- Groundbreaking: 1879
- Completed: 1881

Specifications
- Direction of façade: East
- Capacity: 580 worshipers

Website
- garnethill.org.uk

Listed Building – Category A
- Official name: 129 HILL STREET AND 29 GARNET STREET, HILL STREET SYNAGOGUE
- Type: Listed Building
- Designated: 27 November 1979
- Reference no.: LB33040

The Garnethill Synagogue is an Orthodox Jewish congregation and synagogues located in Garnethill, Glasgow, Scotland, in the United Kingdom. Completed in 1881, the historic synagogue is considered the "cathedral synagogue" of Scotland.

== Architecture ==
The synagogue was designed by John McLeod of Dumbarton, in conjunction with London-based architect Nathan Solomon Joseph of the United Synagogue; and built in the period of 1879-81. McLeod designed a number of churches and public buildings in Glasgow and the west of Scotland, including the Women’s Christian Association in Bath Street, Glasgow. McLeod was the architect of the fruit warehouses of Simons, Jacob & Co, headed by Benjamin Simons and his son, Michael, both leaders in the Jewish community.

The building's exterior is Romanesque Revival. The basilica-form, orientalist style interior features Byzantine Revival detail. As the main building stands between east and west, the apse in the interior stands towards the east facing Garnet Street. This accords with customs within Jewish religion to face Jerusalem in the east whilst praying. Likewise, the Torah ark is positioned at the east end of the synagogue, which is faced whilst praying. Particularly notable is the splendid Torah Ark, designed by Nathan S. Joseph, it closely resembles the Ark he designed for London's New West End Synagogue. Both Arks are raised on platforms, approached by a series of circular, marble steps and project into the room in the form is a multi-domed and arched building.

The main entrance doorway is 2.4 metres (8 ft) wide. Carved in the stone above in Hebrew, is Devarim (Deuteronomy) Chapter 32, verse 12. The English translation is "God alone let him, and there was no strange God with him". The numerical value of the Hebrew letters used in this verse adds up to the date of the foundation of the building.

The area of the building set apart for men accommodates 362 worshippers; the gallery set apart for ladies 218, giving a total of 580 seats.

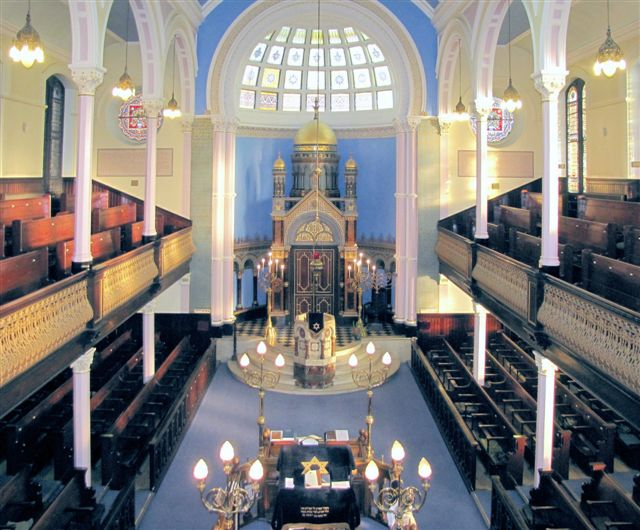
Garnethill Synagogue interior, including seating galleries, apse, and Torah Ark.

Garnethill Synagogue has been described as the finest example of high Victorian synagogue architecture north of Liverpool. It is also included within the top ten of historic synagogues in the UK by Jewish Heritage UK. It also features as a Glasgow City Council listed heritage building, described as the "Mother Synagogue of Glasgow". In 1995, Garnethill Synagogue was granted a Heritage Lottery Grant of £59,150 towards repairs of the building, reflecting its architectural importance in Scotland.

== History ==
The first Jewish community in Glasgow can be traced from c. 1823. By the 1870s, the community numbered around 1,000 and looked to build a permanent synagogue for the first time in Scotland as the converted synagogue in George Street (opened 1878) was full. This decision to build the synagogue was decided by the Special General Meeting in October 1875 and the site at the corner of Garnet Street and Hill Street was decided by a majority of votes as the location for the new synagogue. It was believed that this location was popular because many of the Jewish community were moving to the west of the city, especially many of the leading figures of the community such as Benjamin and Michael Simons. Archive records show that money began coming in through donations to help fund the building of the Synagogue on 24 November 1875. The foundation stone was set by Benjamin Simons two years later in March. Benjamin Simons was one of the trustees. The finished synagogue was officially opened on 9 September 1879 with Rabbi Hermann Adler consecrating the opening. The first service was also held on this date.

From the 1880s, a new wave of immigrant Jews from Eastern Europe, fleeing poverty and persecution, settled in Glasgow - mostly in the Gorbals area south of the river. In time, this community became the majority in Glasgow Jewry. The Synagogue was in a union with South Portland Street Synagogue in the Gorbals from 1886/7 to 1898.

The congregation has been led over the years by a number of rabbis, including Rev Eleazar Philip Phillips, son of Rev. Philip Phillips, and Rev Dr I. K. Cosgrove. Aharon Soudry was the last serving minister of Garenthill synagogue who served until 2010. Services have been led by lay members of the congregation since Soudry left. This is not unfamiliar practice within synagogues and reflects the Jewish community focus and collectiveness.

For thirty years from 1925, the synagogue's cantor was Isaac Hirshow. He is commemorated by a plaque in the synagogue's main hallway.

The synagogue has historically led the way in welfare activities for the Jewish community in Glasgow. The first Jewish welfare charities in the city were founded at Garnethill. More recently, the congregation operated a refugee hostel in its grounds in the 1930s/1940s - the Boys' Hostel

The synagogue was recognised as a Category B listed building in 1979, and upgraded to a Category A listed building in 2004.

== Services ==
The Shabbat service is delivered on Saturday mornings. There are also extra services conducted throughout the year, such as Passover celebrations. Services are delivered in Hebrew and English. Garnethill Synagogue is welcoming to families, students, and visitors. Garnethill Synagogue is a venue for weddings, priding itself in allowing couples to marry under a chuppah that has been part of the synagogue for over a hundred years.

== Outreach work ==
Garnethill Synagogue engages in the overall civic life of Glasgow, through various partnership arrangements with statutory and third sector bodies via providing information and resources into activities such as arts festivals and other forms of community engagement. For example, it is a part of Glasgow's Doors Open Days festival, where a lot of Glasgow’s most important buildings in public and private ownership, and of historical interest, are open to the general public at least once a year.

As part of its outreach work, the synagogue is involved in a number of community projects such as, "Stepping into Diversity" - an interfaith themed youth film making project, in partnership with the West of Scotland Regional Equality Council and Interfaith Glasgow.

The synagogue is open for visiting by the general public through a weekday guided tours service, which can be booked online through the Scottish Jewish Heritage Centre. Researchers can visit by special arrangement with the Scottish Jewish Archives Centre.

Due to its location within the city centre of Glasgow it is close to the prime tourist locations of the Glasgow School of Art and The Tenement House. The synagogue also features in the St Mungo Museum of Comparative Religion.

== Scottish Jewish Archive Centre ==
The synagogue houses The Scottish Jewish Archives Centre (SJAC) which was formed in 1987. It collects and preserves a wide range of material illustrating the Jewish experience in Scotland since the 18th Century. It provides information to the researchers and encourages the study of Jews in Scotland, and has worked in partnership with the universities of Glasgow and Edinburgh.

The SJAC is also home to 'A New Life in Scotland' – an exhibition featuring a timeline of Jewish history in Scotland, works by Scottish Jewish artists, themed display cases and a display on Jewish immigration to Scotland over the past 200 years.

The SJAC has the minutes of the Glasgow Hebrew Congregation for the period leading up to the building of the synagogue and also the cash book of the building fund. This provides useful primary sources to understand all aspects that pertain to the construction of the synagogue including decisions made, dealings with architects, suppliers, manufacturers of stained glass, wood, metalwork etc.

== Scottish Jewish Heritage Centre ==
The synagogue houses the Scottish Jewish Heritage Centre (SJHC) which opened in July 2021. The SJHC was created in partnership by the Garnethill Synagogue Preservation Trust and the Scottish Jewish Archives Centre. The aims of the SJHC are to:

- Increase access to Scotland’s Jewish and Holocaust-era history.
- Encourage wider and more diverse engagement with SJAC’S collections
- Expand access to Garnethill Synagogue and its heritage
- Make a lasting difference to the welfare of the heritage, the people involved, the local community and beyond

The Heritage Centre also houses the Scottish Holocaust-era Study Centre. The Study Centre contains digital resources for schools and visiting researchers and a library focussing on the Holocaust. Specially-developed resources allow pupils to explore the experience of refugees from Nazi Germany and occupied Europe who came to Scotland around the period of the Second World War.

== Academic links ==
Garnethill Synagogue has historic and contemporary links to the universities of Glasgow and Edinburgh via alumni from the synagogue's congregation. Members of the congregation have graduated from the University of Glasgow, including Asher Asher, the first Glasgow born Jewish student to complete a medical degree at the University of Glasgow in 1856 and the former cantor Rev. Isaac Hirshow. Asher was involved in a number of humanitarian programs including providing medical provision to impoverished Jews of London's east end and general advice work on the welfare of Jewish immigrants. A memorial plaque dedicated to Asher Asher stands at the entrance of the synagogue and an academic prize at the University of Glasgow is named after him. Isaac Hirshow was the first person to receive a Bachelor of Music at the University of Glasgow in October 1939.

The Scottish Jewish Archives Centre also has links with Glasgow and Edinburgh universities departments of Jewish Studies as part of the Research Network of Jewish Studies at the University of Edinburgh.

== See also ==
- List of Jewish communities in the United Kingdom
- History of the Jews in Scotland
- Oldest synagogues in the United Kingdom
