= Exeter Synagogue =

Synagogue in Exeter, England

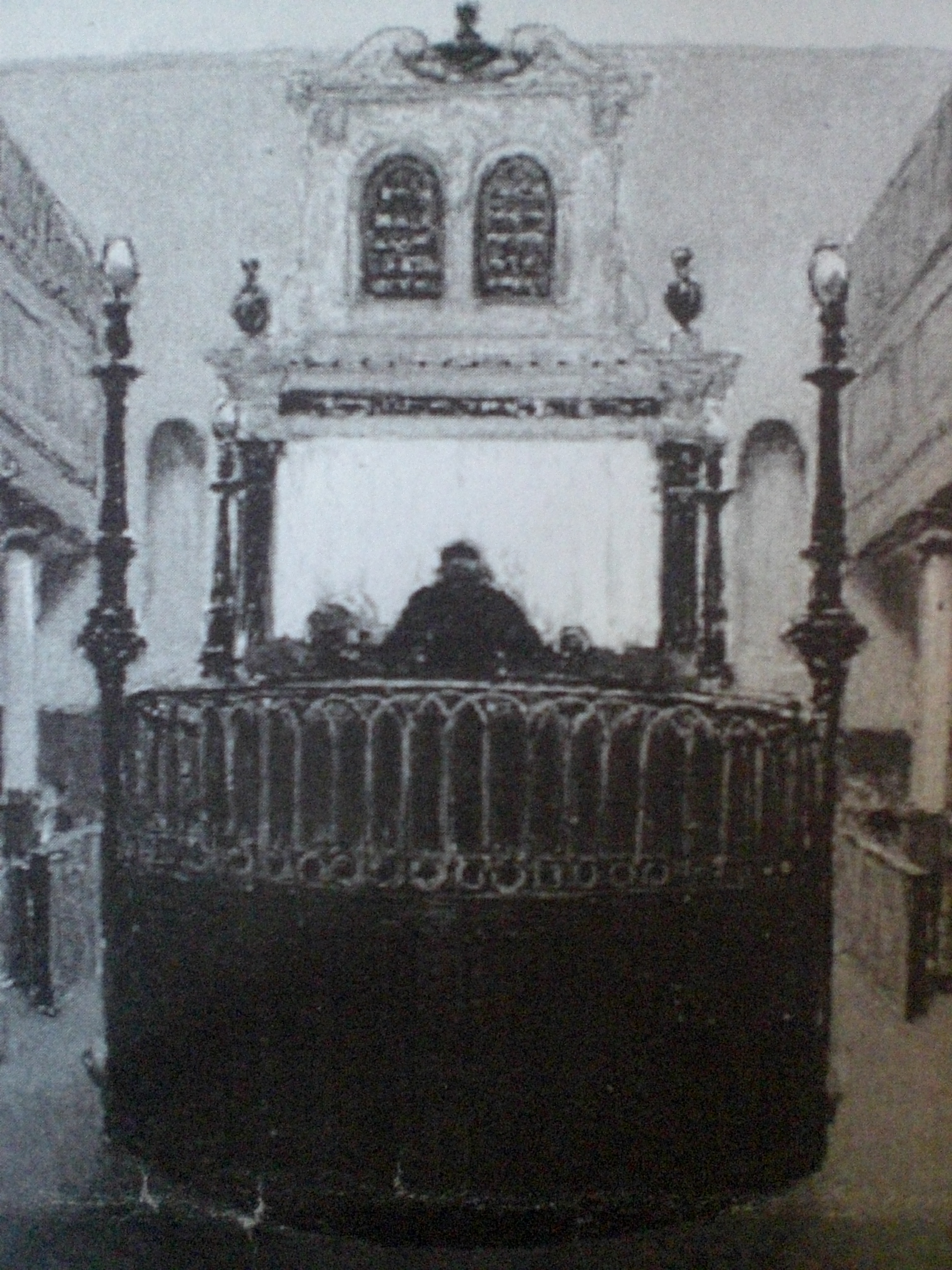
- Exeter Synagogue, an image of an 1881 painting by John White of the synagogue's interior

- Location of the synagogue in Devon

Religion
- Affiliation: Judaism
- Rite: Nusach Ashkenaz
- Ecclesiastical or organisational status: Synagogue
- Leadership: Lay-led
- Status: Active

Location
- Location: Mary Arches Street, Exeter, Devon, England
- Country: United Kingdom
- Coordinates: 50°43′21″N 3°32′02″W

Architecture
- Architect: Stephen Emanuel
- Type: Synagogue architecture
- Established: 1720s (as a congregation)
- Completed: 1763
- Direction of façade: East

Website
- exetersynagogue.org.uk

Listed Building – Grade II*
- Official name: Synagogue, Mary Arches Street
- Type: Listed building
- Designated: 29 January 1953
- Reference no.: 1273591

The Exeter Synagogue is a Jewish synagogue, located in Synagogue Place, Mary Arches Street, in the old city of Exeter, Devon, England, in the United Kingdom. Established in the 1720s as the Exeter Hebrew Congregation, an Orthodox congregation that worshiped in the Ashkenazi rite, the congregation has been led by laity since c. 1990s, and caters to all shades of Judaism including Reform, Liberal, Masorti and other Jewish denominations.

Designed by Stephen Emanuel and completed in 1763, the synagogue building is the third oldest synagogues in the United Kingdom. The synagogue was originally built as a Sephardi synagogue for Dutch Jews trading in Exeter.

== History ==
The Jews in Exeter have a long history, though there is currently little evidence to support the existence of a Jewish community in Roman Exeter. The first Jew in Exeter was mentioned in 1181, and the community is believed to have owned its own burial ground and synagogue before antisemitic rulings of Exeter's Synod in 1287, which aided the expulsion of the Jews from England in 1290.

The first Jew known to have settled in Exeter in modern times was a Mr. Jacob Monis from Padua, who advertised his services in 1724 as a Hebrew and Italian teacher. He was joined by his nephew Joseph Ottolenghi, who was employed as the community's shochet. A scandal between these two, when Joseph subsequently converted to Christianity, is the subject of many useful documents which have shed light on Exeter's Jewish history.

With the accession of the Hanoverians to the throne of England, Jews of German origin settled in Exeter; and by 1757 the community had taken lease of a burial ground at Bull Meadow, just outside the city walls. On 5 November 1763, Abraham Ezekiel and Kitty Jacobs leased land in Mary Arches—via a local non-Jew, to avoid the restrictions on Jewish ownership of land—on which the present Exeter Synagogue was consecrated on 10 August 1764. A letter found in the Devon Record Office describes the consecration, in which the Torah was carried seven times around the bimah and the national anthem was sung.

The Ezekiel family continued to lead and support the local community for 75 years, and special services were held in the synagogue for events such as the coronation of George IV and the death of Prince Albert. The community dwindled throughout the nineteenth century: in 1842 there were only about thirty families, and in 1878 there were fewer than ten. For much of the late 19th to the early 20th centuries, the Synagogue was located near the entrance to overcrowded slum dwellings one of the poorest areas of central Exeter. Regular services were abandoned in 1889.

Six years later the synagogue was revived by Charles Samuels, who was the community's leader until his death in 1944. The synagogue was damaged in the Baedecker Blitz during the Second World War. Although small in numbers, the community today is spread widely over Devon, Cornwall, Somerset and Dorset and holds regular services using a variety of traditions. Exeter Hebrew Congregation still owns and maintains the Bull Meadow Jewish cemetery.

In July 2018, extreme right-wing anti-semite Tristan Morgan set fire to the synagogue in an attempt to burn it down. Morgan was found guilty of terrorism charges and sentenced to an indeterminate hospital order before his potential release can be considered by court.

== Architecture ==
Exeter Synagogue, like most eighteenth-century synagogues, is tucked away from the main thoroughfares of the old city and is windowless, presumably as a security feature during its time of construction. The synagogue was constructed in a traditional Orthodox style, with a women's balcony, and was heavily restored throughout the 1980s. The building also currently contains room for a small cheder. Perhaps the most distinguishing feature of Exeter Synagogue (in which it resembles the synagogue in Plymouth) is its Aron Kodesh (Torah ark), a wooden structure carved to resemble marble. The ark contains a quotation from Psalms 5:8, "I will worship towards thy holy temple in fear of thee", and is believed to have been made by north German craftsmen. A building next to the synagogue which originally contained the cheder and minister's residences was demolished during the 1960s.

Major refurbishments made in 1830 uncovered vivid colours and decorations on the columns and ark of the synagogue, and in the 1980s window lighting was added in the ceiling. The wealth of colourful design in the synagogue is due to the fact that the exterior of the synagogue was subject to regulations at the time of construction, so that the most noticeable architectural features are to be found within. Replacements of wall panelling, seating, the upper galleries, and central heating all took place in 1997.

== List of rabbis ==
Exeter's Jewish community did not maintain a full complement of religious staff for the majority of its history and after 1867 with the departure of Rabbi Myer Mendlessohn for Bristol it was served by Rabbis with very short terms, and to this day Exeter's community has no rabbi (in part due to its being affiliated with neither the Movement for Reform Judaism nor the United Synagogue), with services being led by members of the congregation and visiting rabbis. The previous rabbis were:

- 1795–1839: Rabbi Moses Horowitz Levy
- 1839–1840: Rabbi Michael Levy Green
- 1841–1852: Rabbi Samuel Hoffnung
- 1852–1853: Rabbi Berthold Aldu
- 1854–1867: Rabbi Myer Mendlessohn

== See also ==
- History of the Jews in England
- List of Jewish communities in the United Kingdom
- List of synagogues in the United Kingdom
- Oldest synagogues in the United Kingdom
