= History of the Jews in North East England =

The Jewish presence in north east England is focused on a number of important towns.

== Gateshead ==
Gateshead is the home to a sizable community of what are often called ultra-Orthodox Haredi Jews. The community is acclaimed for its higher educational institutions and is often referred to as the Oxbridge of Britain’s Jewish community. Talmudic students from many countries travel to Gateshead to attend its yeshivas and kollels. Young Jewish women come to study at the Teacher Training College and Beis Chaya Rochel.

Based in the Bensham area, the community includes over 600 families as of 2020.

The community was established at the end of the 19th century when Eastern European Jewish refugees Eliezer Adler and Zachariah Bernstone chose to leave the Newcastle upon Tyne congregation, which they viewed as too lenient in religious matters, and crossed the river to set up a new synagogue. Following the Holocaust, Gateshead became home to the largest Orthodox Jewish education complex in postwar Europe, and the most significant outside of the United States and Israel. This can partly be attributed to the arrival of Orthodox Jewish refugees who were fleeing the European mainland during the Nazi era. As a result, Gateshead became an important centre of Torah Judaism.

And it was Reb Dovid Dryan in 1941, whose Torah permeated soul conceived the idea – wild impractical and heroic – of setting up a Kolel in Gateshead. In September 1941 (Elul 5740) he sent letters to 20 prominent Rabbonim in England inviting them to join him in making his latest dream a reality.

The Gateshead Talmudical College is an important and well known Haredi advanced yeshiva in Gateshead attracting students from all over the world. Gateshead has the only expanding Jewish community in the North East. It is also the largest yeshiva in Europe.

The launch of Gateshead Kehilla Kollel in 2021 led to the largest shift in community dynamics since its inception. When visionary Rabbi Zelig Kupetz, with the guidance of community leader Mr Meir Menashe Bodner launched his new project to rejuvenate the town, Gateshead Community Kollel attracted 60 new students, including the famous inventor David Gurwicz. Gateshead Community Kollel has three primary sections: The Founding Chabura, led by Rabbi Benzion Zahn; The Halacha Be'iyun Chabura, led by Rabbi efraim Abenson, formerly of Mir Yeshiva, and the newest Yeshiva Chabura led by rabbi zvi gutterman

Rabbi Shraga Feivel Zimmerman served as rov and av beis din of the Gateshead Jewish community from April 2008 until January 2020. During his tenure he provided halachic and communal leadership and oversaw the community’s religious institutions. In 2020 he left Gateshead to become rov and av beis din of the Federation of Synagogues in London Rabbi Yisroel Mantel was elected by the Gateshead Jewish community in November 2025 to serve as its chief rabbi. He had previously been offered the position in 2020 but declined at that time due to commitments in New York. His appointment followed a six-year vacancy after the departure of his predecessor. He is recognised as a senior halachic authority and assumed office following his installation in late 2025.

=== List of yeshivas in Gateshead ===
- Baer Hatorah
- Gateshead Yeshiva
- Nesivos Hatorah
- Nezer Hatorah
- Sunderland Yeshiva
- Tiferes Ya'akov
- Yagdil Torah
- Maalos Hatorah

=== List of seminaries in Gateshead ===
- Beis Chaya Rochel
- Jewish Teachers Training College - known as 'The Old Sem'

Pictures of Jewish institutions in Gateshead

== Newcastle ==
No records have been found of Jews being resident in Newcastle before 1830 although there is a tradition that the community dates from 1775. It is thought, however, that over 500 years prior to this Jews resided in Silver Street (formerly known as Jew Gate). In 1830, a cemetery was acquired and by 1831 the community number 100. On 8 October 1832 the congregation was formally established. The cathedral bells were rung when the first synagogue, in Temple Street, was officially opened on 13 July 1838. The Newcastle Courant published a headline in Hebrew.

By 1845 the congregation had grown to 33 adults and 33 children. Through the course of time nearly all the original founders either died or had left the city, but the influx of Polish and Russian immigrants had more than replaced this loss.

An imposing stone building was erected in Leazes Park Road in 1880 and consecrated by the Chief Rabbi. At that time the number of Jews in Newcastle was about 750. The congregation was in being until 1978

Sir Israel Brodie – the first Chief Rabbi to be knighted, was born in Newcastle in 1895.

There were many more developments and synagogues in Newcastle during the 20th century: Corporation Street Synagogue (1904–1924), Jesmond Synagogue (1914–1986), Ravensworth Terrace Synagogue (1925–1969), and Gosforth and Kenton Hebrew Congregation (1947–1984)

With the drift of population from the West End of Newcastle, Jesmond synagogue was consecrated in 1914 leaving the oldest, the Leazes Park Road Synagogue in the centre of the city. A third synagogue was built in Gosforth, the Gosforth and Kenton Hebrew congregation. Eventually the running of the three Orthodox Congregations was considered as being uneconomical and with a declining population in other parts of the town a new purpose built Community Centre and Synagogue was built in Gosforth at Culzean Park in an area in which the majority of Jews resided. A new Reform movement Synagogue was built in 1986 nearby and continues to flourish.

In March 2021, the 300 seat purpose built Culzean Park Synagogue was down to its last 50 members and consequently, was sold to developers. The Synagogue has now moved into the Lionel Jacobson House - Community Centre down the road on 20 Graham Park Road.

== Sunderland ==
The first Jewish settlement in Sunderland was in 1755 and the first congregation was established in about 1768. The Sunderland Congregation was the first regional community to be represented on the Board of Deputies of British Jews. Rabbi Shmaryahu Yitzchak Bloch ministered in Sunderland in the early 20th century.

At the 2001 census, 114 people of Jewish faith were recorded as living in Sunderland, a vanishingly small percentage. There was no Jewish community before 1750, though subsequently a number of Jewish merchants from across the UK and Europe settled in Sunderland. The Sunderland Synagogue on Ryhope Road (opened in 1928) closed at the end of March 2006.

The Sunderland Beth Hamedrash was established in Villiers St in about 1890 which is still standing. In 1930 it moved to a purpose-built building in Mowbray Road. It closed in 1984. The building is no longer extant.

The Sunderland Talmudical College, a Haredi yeshiva founded in the city in 1945, relocated to Gateshead in 1990.

The North-East Joel Intract Memorial Home for Aged Jews was opened in Sunderland in 1963 and closed in 1998.

The Jewish community in Sunderland has fallen to very few in recent years.

== Hartlepool ==
Hartlepool attracted a small Jewish community during the Victorian period. The community constructed a synagogue in 1871. It closed permanently in 1960 and was demolished by 1975. The nearby cemetery is called Spion Kop Cemetery. The Hartlepool council now holds all records and maintains the cemetery.
