= List of people from Sunderland =

This is a list of famous or notable people born in, or associated with, Sunderland or the wider City of Sunderland in North East England.

== Notable people from Sunderland ==
=== Arts ===
- Debbie Arnold (1955–), actor
- Griselda Allan (1905–1987), artist
- Audrey Amiss (1933–2013), artist
- Marion Angus (1865–1946), Scottish poet writing in Scots, born in Sunderland
- James Baxter, actor
- Ernie Lotinga (actor)
- James Bolam (1935–), actor
- Alan Browning actor, born Alan Brown
- Bernard Comrie (1947–), linguist
- Ida Cook (1904–1986), Righteous among the Nations; as Mary Burchell, romance novelist
- Terry Deary (1946–), author
- Mike Elliott, comedian, actor and radio presenter
- Edward Gregson, composer
- James Herriot (pen name of James Alfred Wight) (1916–1995), veterinary surgeon and author
- Melanie Hill (1962–), actress
- Nat Jackley, comedian
- Jools Jameson (1968–), game developer
- Bobby Knoxall, comedian
- Gina McKee (1964–), actress
- Gibb McLaughlin (1884–1960), actor, born George Gibb McLaughlin
- Christine Norden (1924–1988), actress, born Mary Lydia Thornton
- David Parfitt, an Oscar-winning film producer
- Sheila Quigley, novelist
- Rob Rackstraw (1965-), voice actor
- Ronald Radd (1929–1976), actor
- Callum Keith Rennie (1960–), film and television actor
- Richard Riddell (2000-), film and television actor
- Maurice Roëves (1937–2020), actor
- William Russell actor and the first actor of three actors to appear as Doctor Who Companion
- Clarkson Stanfield, painter
- Mary Stewart, novelist
- Tom Taylor, playwright and editor of Punch
- Alan Temperley born 1936, children's and young adults author, works include Harry and the Wrinkles, The Deck Boy, Scar Hill.
- Bobby Thompson, comedian, the 'Little Waster'
- William Lindon-Travers, actor, screenwriter, director and animal rights activist, known professionally as Bill Travers
- Linden Travers, actor
- Graham Wallas, author and academic
- Alison Wright (1976–), actress
- Michael Young (1966–), industrial designer

=== Industry ===
- Sir Robert Appleby Bartram (1835–1925), shipbuilder
- William Reid Clanny (1770–1850), inventor and physician
- John Cryan (born 1960), banker
- Sir Tom Cowie, entrepreneur and philanthropist
- George Daniels, horologist and inventor of the co-axial escapement
- Sir Edward Temperley Gourley, coalfitter, shipowner and politician
- Sir William Halcrow, civil engineer
- Thomas Elliott Harrison, railway engineer
- George Burton Hunter, shipbuilder and innovator
- Patrick Meik and Charles Meik, civil engineering brothers
- Sir William Mills, inventor of the Mills Bomb (hand grenade)
- William Pile, shipbuilder
- Sir Joseph Swan, inventor of the electric light bulb
- Harry Watts, shipyard worker and multiple life-saver

=== Military and services ===
- Robert Appleby Bartram (1894–1981), colonel and shipbuilder
- Gertrude Bell (1868–1926), colonial administrator
- PC Keith Blakelock (1945–1985), police officer
- Sir Lawrence Andrew Common (1889–1953), Army officer and shipping director
- Jack Crawford (1775–1831), sailor
- Sir Henry Havelock (1795–1857), Major-General
- Captain Richard Avery Hornsby, navy captain
- Joseph Robert Kayll (1914–2000), WW2 RAF flying Ace
- John Lilburne 'Free-born John', civil war figure
- Alan Parnaby (1916–1974), cricketer and British Army officer
- Ernest Vaux (1865–1925), Army Officer and Brewer
- Robert Nairac (1948–1977), Army Officer

=== Music ===
- Don Airey, musician, keyboardist with Deep Purple
- Sir Thomas Allen, baritone
- Eric Boswell, songwriter (Little Donkey)
- Mark Brydon, one half of electro outfit Moloko
- Muriel Foster, contralto
- Frankie Stubbs, Singer, Guitar player, Leatherface, punk rock band
- Frankie & The Heartstrings, indie rock band
- The Futureheads, indie rock band
- Eve Gallagher, singer
- Kenickie, 1990s pop band
- Lauren Laverne, ex-lead singer of Kenickie, later radio and TV presenter
- Jez Lowe, folk singer, songwriter and broadcaster
- Bob and Alf Pearson, singers, pianist (Bob) and variety performers
- Alan Price, singer, musician, and songwriter. Keyboard player with The Animals
- Emeli Sandé, musician
- David A. Stewart (1952–), musician and songwriter, most notably as one half of the band Eurythmics
- The Toy Dolls, punk rock band
- Baz Warne, guitarist with The Stranglers
- Faye Fantarrow (2002-2023), singer, songwriter

=== Politics ===
- Hilary Armstrong, Member of Parliament, Cabinet Office and Social Exclusion Minister, Chancellor of the Duchy of Lancaster, 2006–07
- Sir Theodore Doxford, shipbuilder and politician
- George Hudson, Member of Parliament and railway financier
- Sir Edward Temperley Gourley, coalfitter, shipowner and politician
- John Stapylton grey Pemberton (1860–1940), MP and Vice-Chancellor of Durham University
- Bridget Phillipson, Labour Party MP
- Jonathan Reynolds, Labour Party MP
- Sir Luke Thompson, coal merchant and politician
- Joseph Havelock Wilson, Trade union leader, Liberal Party politician, and campaigner for the rights of merchant seamen.

=== Sport ===
- Charles W. Alcock: Cricketer and Football administrator.
- Allan Ball (born 1943), ex-professional footballer and now Honorary Director of Queen of the South F.C.
- Gordon Bradley (1933–2008), footballer and manager
- Raich Carter (1914–1994), footballer and manager
- Nigel Clough (born 1966), former football player and manager
- Ralph Coates (1946–2010), former football player
- Kevin Dillon (English footballer) (born 1959), former football player and manager
- Randolph Galloway (1896–1964), former football player and manager of clubs like Valencia and Sporting Lisbon
- Michael Gray (born 1974), (footballer)
- Billy Hardy (born 1964), boxer who became Commonwealth featherweight champion
- Mick Harford (born 1959), former football player and manager
- Micky Hazard (born 1960), former football player
- Jordan Henderson (born 1990), footballer Sunderland A.F.C, Liverpool F.C-Current and England national football team
- Lee Howey (born 1969), footballer Sunderland A.F.C
- Steve Howey (born 1971), footballer Newcastle United
- Jordan Pickford (born 1994), footballer Sunderland A.F.C, Everton F.C-Current and England national football team
- Robert William "Bob" Jefferson (born 1882), footballer
- Tony Jeffries (born 1985), boxer, Olympic Bronze medalist
- Ernie Johnson (born 1948), jockey who won the 1969 Epsom Derby
- Alan Kennedy: Footballer, Liverpool F.C.
- Paul Kitson, ex-professional footballer
- Billy Marsden (born 1901), football player for England national football team
- Clive Mendonca, ex-professional footballer
- Jimmy Montgomery (born 1943), former football player (goalkeeper) and 1973 FA Cup winner
- Bob Paisley (1919-1996) Footballer, Three times European Cup winning manager.
- Mick Parkin (born 1995), mixed martial artist in UFC
- Alan Parnaby (1916–1974), cricketer and British Army officer
- Ross Pearson (born 1984), mixed martial artist in UFC
- Harry Potts (1920–1996), former football player and manager
- Harold Reay (1896-1959), footballer
- Giovanni Reyna (born 2002), footballer For BVB and USA National Team
- Lee Rushworth (born 1982), cricketer
- Jill Scott (born 1987), football player for England women's national football team and Manchester City L.F.C.
- Bob Willis (1949–2019), cricketer
- Stephanie Houghton (born 1988), football player for England women's national football team and Manchester City L.F.C.

=== Other ===
- Kate Adie, former BBC Chief News Reporter
- Jessica Andrews, novelist
- St Bede, monk
- George Binns, New Zealand chartist leader and poet
- St Benedict Biscop (628?–690)
- Abel Chapman (1851–1929), hunter and naturalist
- George Clarke, architect, television presenter
- James Watson Corder (1868–1953), historian of local family history
- Charlotte Crosby, television personality
- John Cryan, physicist and bank manager
- Peter Gibbs, weather forecaster
- Jane Grigson, cookery writer
- Andreas Høivold, professional poker player
- Gareth Pugh (born 1981), fashion designer
- Denise Robertson, novelist and TV agony aunt
- Gordon Scurfield, biologist and author, active in Australia, with expertise in botany and ecology
- William Shanks, amateur mathematician, worked out the value of Pi to 707 decimals
- John Sowerby, botanist, writer and early member of the Alpine Club
- Chris Steele, TV doctor
- Ernest George Frederick Vogtherr (1898–1973), a New Zealand bacon curer, businessman and art collector

== Notable residents ==
- Charlie Buchan, footballer
- Lewis Carroll, author of Alice in Wonderland
- Frank Caws, architect
- Brian Clough, footballer, manager and European Cup winner
- Steve Cram, Olympic Athlete and TV presenter
- Bernard Gilpin, Apostle of the North, Rector of Houghton-le-Spring, Archdeacon of Durham
- Sir William Herschel, composer and astronomer, discoverer of Uranus
- William Reid Clanny, Irish physicist
- Thomas Essomba, boxer
- Charlie Hurley, footballer
- Alex Kapranos, musician/singer
- Roy Kent, footballer
- Si King, television presenter, best known as one half of the Hairy Bikers
- Lola Montez, adventuress
- Chris Mullin, civil liberties campaigner and Labour MP
- Jimmy Nail, actor/singer
- Robert Nairac (1948–1977), Army Officer
- William Paley, rector of Bishopwearmouth, wrote on intelligent design as opposed to evolution
- Frank Pick, industrial designer
- Niall Quinn, footballer
- Don Revie, footballer and England manager
- George Reynolds, businessman and former chairman of Darlington FC
- William Sancroft, later Archbishop of Canterbury, was briefly Rector of Houghton-le-Spring
- Len Shackleton, footballer
- Michael Short, engineer and Professor
- Peter Smith (1956-2025), computer scientist
- Vivian Stanshall and his wife Ki Longfellow, found the Baltic Trader "Thekla" and sailed her to Bristol where she became the Old Profanity Showboat
- Shammai Zahn, rabbi of Sunderland and head of Sunderland Yeshiva
- Gareth Pugh, British fashion designer
