= List of people from Tyne and Wear =

The list of people from Tyne and Wear, in North East England, is divided by metropolitan borough:

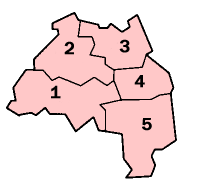
1. Gateshead
2. Newcastle upon Tyne
3. North Tyneside
4. South Tyneside
5. Sunderland
