= Rabbi Falk =

Rabbi Falk can refer to several people:

- Joshua Falk (1555–1614), Polish Halakhist and Talmudist
- Jacob Joshua Falk (1680–1756), Rabbi in Poland and Germany
- Hayyim Samuel Jacob Falk (1708–1782), British kabbalist known as the Baal Shem of London
- Pesach Eliyahu Falk, a posek in Gateshead
