= List of people from Gateshead =

Notable residents (past and present) of Gateshead, Tyne and Wear, England, United Kingdom

- Eliezer Adler – Founder of Jewish Community
- Marcus Bentley – Narrator of Big Brother
- Thomas Bewick – Engraver
- William Booth – Founder of the Salvation Army
- Catherine Booth – William's Wife. Known as 'La Marechale' she founded the Salvation Army in continental Europe
- Mary Bowes – 'The Unhappy Countess' Author and celebrity
- Ian Branfoot – Football manager
- Richard Brodie - Former footballer and current manager of Skelmersdale United
- Frank Clark – Footballer and Manager
- Harry Clasper – Oarsman
- David Clelland – Labour politician and MP
- Joseph Cowen – Radical politician
- Steve Cram – Athlete Middle distance runner
- Shanice Davidson – Trampoline gymnast
- Emily Davies – Educational reformer and feminist. Founder of Girton College Cambridge
- Daniel Defoe – Writer and government agent
- Madeleine Hope Dodds – Historian, co-founder of Progressive Players - Little Theatre Gateshead
- Jonathan Edwards – Athlete and television presenter
- Sir George Elliot – Industrialist and MP
- Pesach Eliyahu Falk – rabbi
- Paul Gascoigne – Footballer
- Robert Gilchrist (Poet) – Poet/Songwriter
- Alex Glasgow – Singer/Songwriter
- Avrohom Gurwicz – Rabbi, Dean of Gateshead Yeshiva
- Leib Gurwicz – Rabbi, former Dean of Gateshead Yeshiva
- Jill Halfpenny – Actress
- Michelle Heaton – Member of Liberty X
- David Hodgson – Football manager
- Sharon Hodgson – Member of Parliament
- Norman Hunter – Footballer, member of 1966 World Cup winning England squad
- Don Hutchison – Footballer
- Brian Johnson – Current lead singer with rock band AC/DC
- Tommy Johnson – Footballer, ex Celtic
- Howard Kendall – Footballer and football manager
- Frances King (philanthropist) (1757–1821) buried in Saint Mary's Churchyard
- Gibson Kyle - 19th century architect
- Will Lawson, Australian and New Zealand bush poet and writer.
- John Thomas Looney – Shakespeare scholar
- Justin McDonald – Actor
- Lawrie McMenemy – Soccer manager and pundit
- Robert Stirling Newall – Industrialist
- Albert Oxley – footballer
- Sebastian Payne – Political journalist
- Lord Plender – Chartered accountant and public servant
- Bezalel Rakow – Communal rabbi
- James Renforth – Oarsman
- Geordie Ridley – Composer of 'Blaydon Races'
- Chris Ryan – SAS Soldier, holder of the longest escape and evasion record in British military history
- William Shield – Composer, and Master of the King's Musick
- Githa Sowerby – English playwright
- Christina Stead – Australian novelist
- John Steel – Drummer, The Animals
- Steve Stone – Footballer
- Joseph Swan – Inventor of the electric light bulb
- Chris Waddle – Footballer
- William Wailes – Stained glass maker
- Taylor Wane – Porn star
- Robert Spence Watson – Public benefactor
- Sylvia Waugh – Author of the 'Mennyms' series for children
- John Wilson – Conductor, and founder of the John Wilson Orchestra
- Thomas Wilson – Poet, school founder
- (William) Robert Wood – Activist and Senator (migrated to Australia 1963) Selene Benedict.English Glamour Model Steve Wraith Actor.Podcast Host and Newcastle United Spokesperson
