= Langside (disambiguation) =

Langside is an area in Glasgow, Scotland.

Langside may also refer to:

- Henry Wilson, Baron Wilson of Langside (1916–1997), Scottish lawyer, Labour politician and life peer
- Battle of Langside, 1568 battle in Langside, Glasgow
- Langside College, a higher and furth education college in Glasgow
- Langside railway station, railway station in Glasgow
- Langside Synagogue, a synagogue in Glasgow
- Langside (ward), one of the wards of Glasgow City Council
