= List of former synagogues in the United Kingdom =

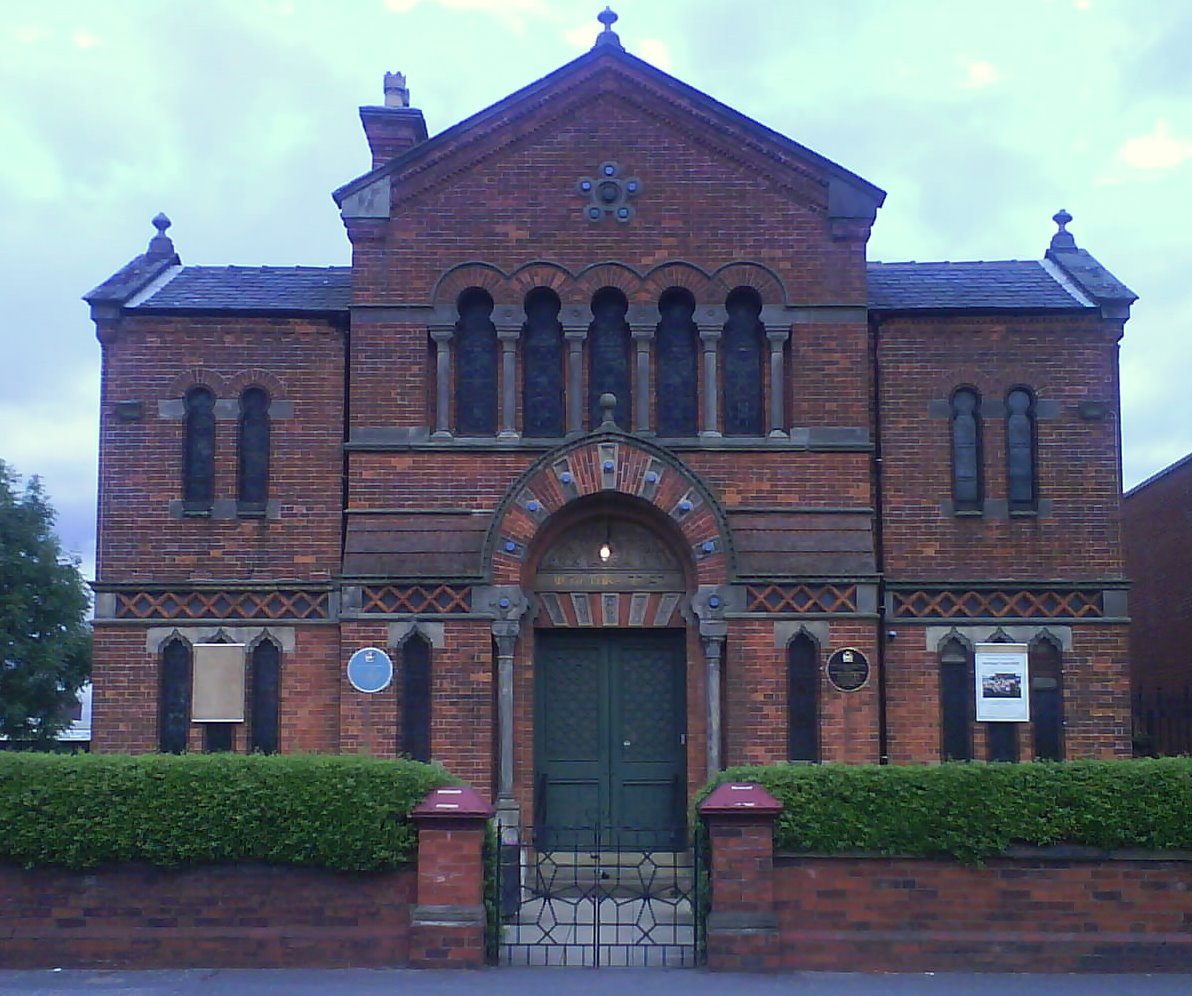
Manchester's Spanish and Portuguese Synagogue, now the Manchester Jewish Museum

This list of former synagogues in the United Kingdom consists of buildings in England, Scotland, Wales and Northern Ireland which were previously used as synagogues; for a list of current Jewish communities or congregations, see List of Jewish communities in the United Kingdom.

== England ==
=== London ===
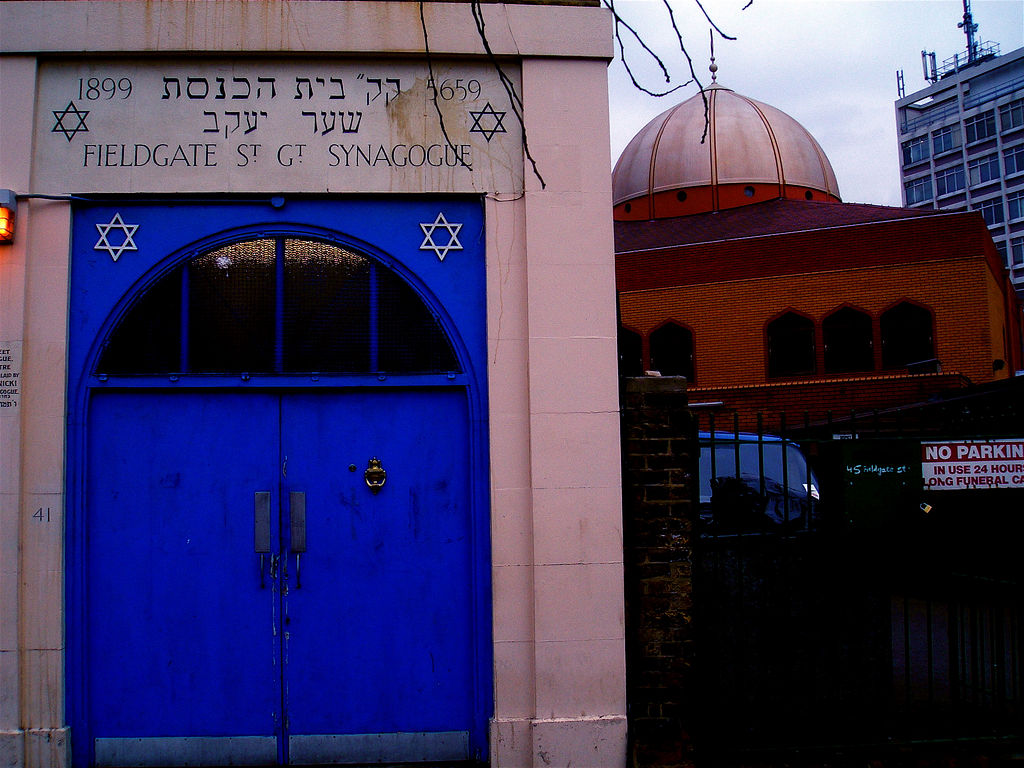
Fieldgate Street Great Synagogue

- Bayswater Synagogue, Chichester Place, Paddington, demolished in 1965 for construction of the Westway overpass and the Warwick Estate redevelopment
- Brixton Synagogue, Effra Road, Brixton
- Dalston Synagogue, Poets Road, Newington Green (c.1875–1970), demolished in 1970 and replaced by a block of council flats
- Dollis Hill Synagogue, which is now part of the Torah Temimah Primary School
- East London Central Synagogue on Nelson Street in the London Borough of Tower Hamlets, whose building opened in 1923, ceased functioning in 2020 and was put up for sale in 2026
- Fieldgate Street Great Synagogue, East End, which closed in 2014
- Great Synagogue of London, City of London, destroyed in The Blitz during World War II
- Machzike Hadath (Spitalfields Great Synagogue), East End, now the Brick Lane Mosque
- New Dalston Synagogue, Dalston, now the Shacklewell Lane Mosque (Masjid Ramadan)
- South East London Synagogue, New Cross
- Wlodawa Synagogue, Bethnal Green, which closed in 1987.

=== Elsewhere ===
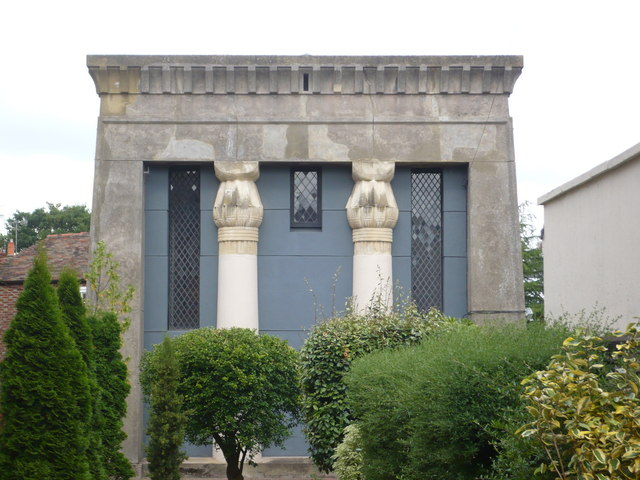
Canterbury Synagogue

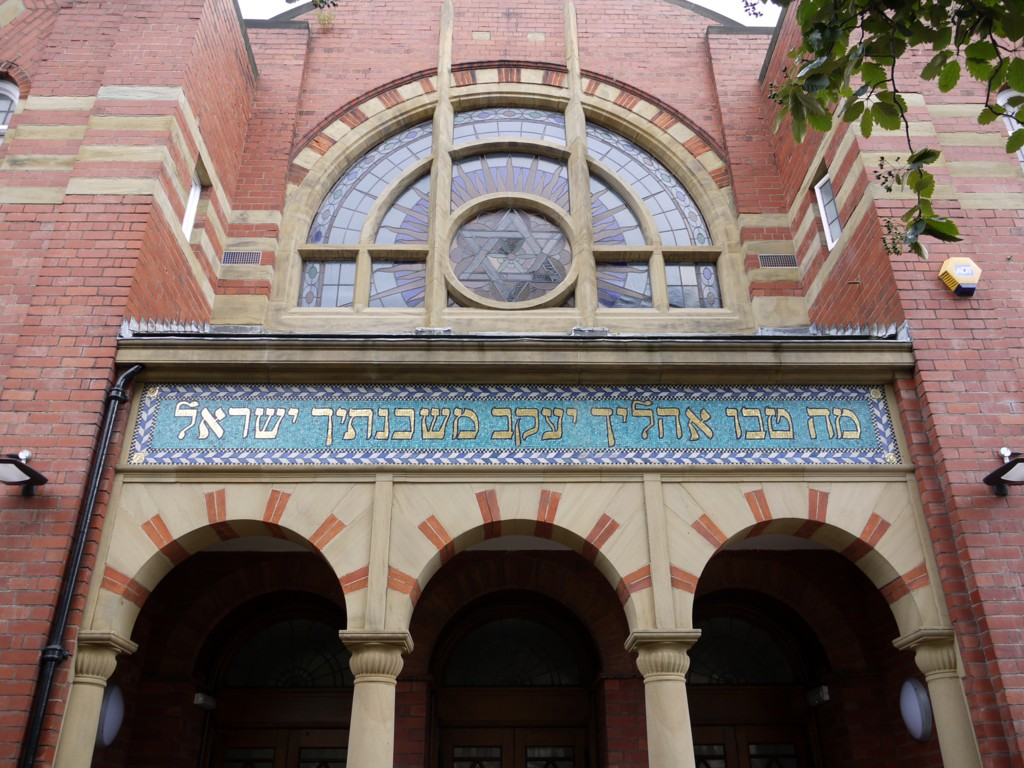
Jesmond Synagogue, Newcastle-upon-Tyne

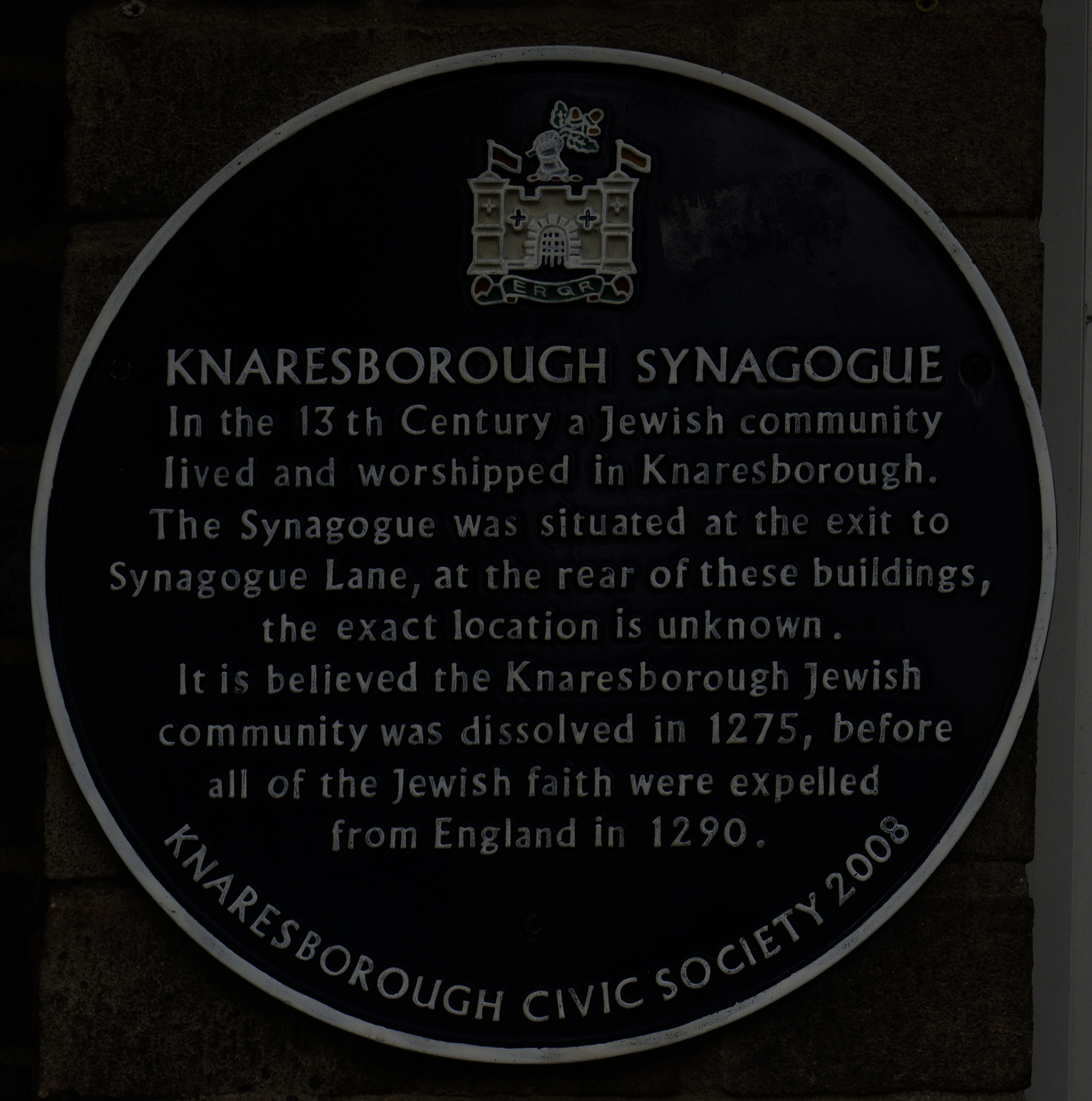
Knaresborough Civic Society plaque commemorating the 13th-century Jewish community that lived and worshipped in Knaresborough

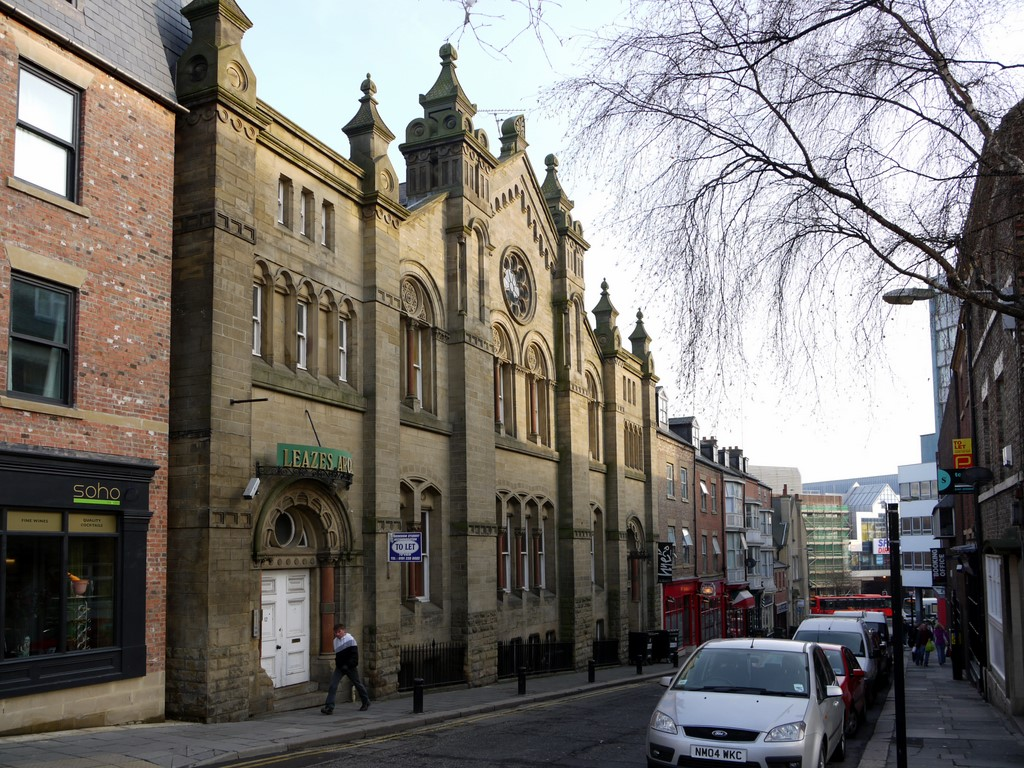
Former Leazes Park Synagogue, Newcastle upon Tyne in 2013

- Barnsley, Yorkshire – Barnsley had a synagogue at 82 Castlereagh Street that was active from 1903 to 1946
- Birmingham – Severn Street Synagogue, now the Athol Masonic Hall
- Blackpool United Hebrew Congregation
- Blackburn Hebrew Congregation
- Bolton Synagogue, at 12a Wentworth Street, Bolton, which functioned as Bolton Hebrew Congregation's synagogue from 1924 until 1960, when it was demolished
- Brighton and Hove Regency Synagogue, Devonshire Place; it is now an apartment building
- Brighton and Hove – Roof-top Synagogue, Brunswick Terrace
- Canterbury had a synagogue on King Street. Designed by Hezekiah Marshall and opened in 1848, it was acquired by The King's School in 1982 and is now used for lessons and concerts.
- Cheltenham Synagogue
- Coventry Synagogue, which was built in 1870 and is Grade II listed
- Derby Hebrew Congregation
- Falmouth, Cornwall – Falmouth Synagogue
- Guildford Synagogue (medieval)
- Hartlepool – (West) Hartlepool Synagogue – demolished in the 1970s
- Hull — Western Synagogue 1903–1994
- Knaresborough, North Yorkshire, until 1275
- Lincoln – Jew's Court Synagogue, dating from the 12th century
- Manchester – Spanish and Portuguese Synagogue, now the Manchester Jewish Museum
- Middlesbrough Hebrew Congregation, which closed in 1998
- Newcastle – Jesmond Synagogue, which closed in 1986. The exterior has been carefully conserved, and the interior was gutted and renovated for use as a school. It formed part of the Newcastle High School for Girls until 2016, when approval was granted for its conversion into flats.
- Newcastle – Leazes Park Synagogue, now used for student accommodation
- Northampton Medieval Synagogue
- Sheffield – Wilson Road Synagogue; the building is now used as a church
- Sunderland Synagogue
- Widnes Synagogue, St Paul's Chambers – closed and became a masonic lodge, later a nightclub, and is now derelict

== Scotland ==
- Dundee Synagogue
- Langside Synagogue, Glasgow

== Wales ==
- Cardiff Old Hebrew Congregation, Cathedral Road, now an office block
- Merthyr Synagogue, Merthyr Tydfil
- Newport Jewish Community and Hebrew Congregation
- Pontypridd Synagogue

== Northern Ireland ==
- Belfast – Regency Street Congregation
- Derry – Londonderry Synagogue
- Lurgan – Lurgan Hebrew Congregation, at 49 North Street, now a dry-cleaning shop

== Gallery ==
Former synagogues in the UK

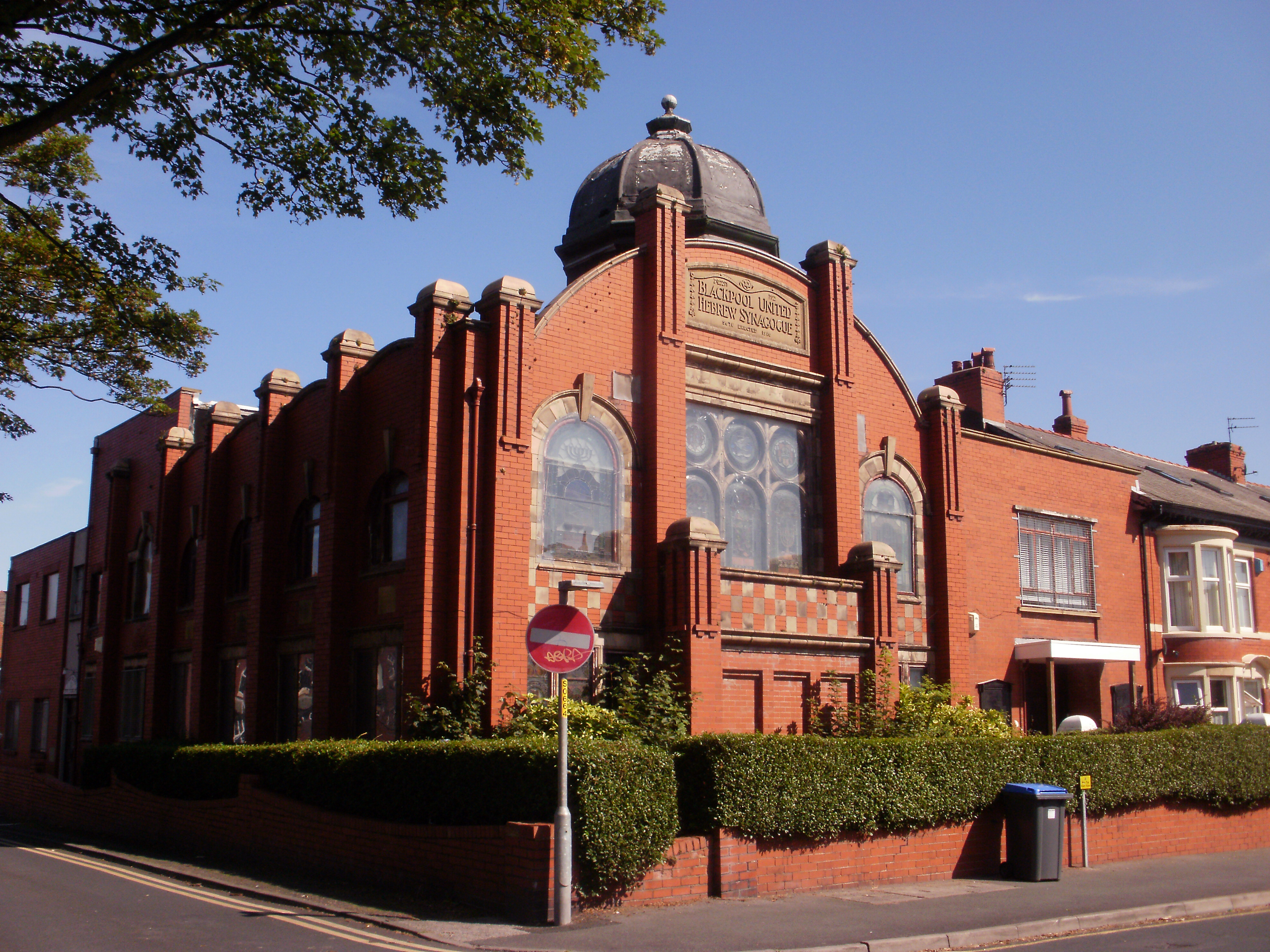
Blackpool United Hebrew Congregation's synagogue

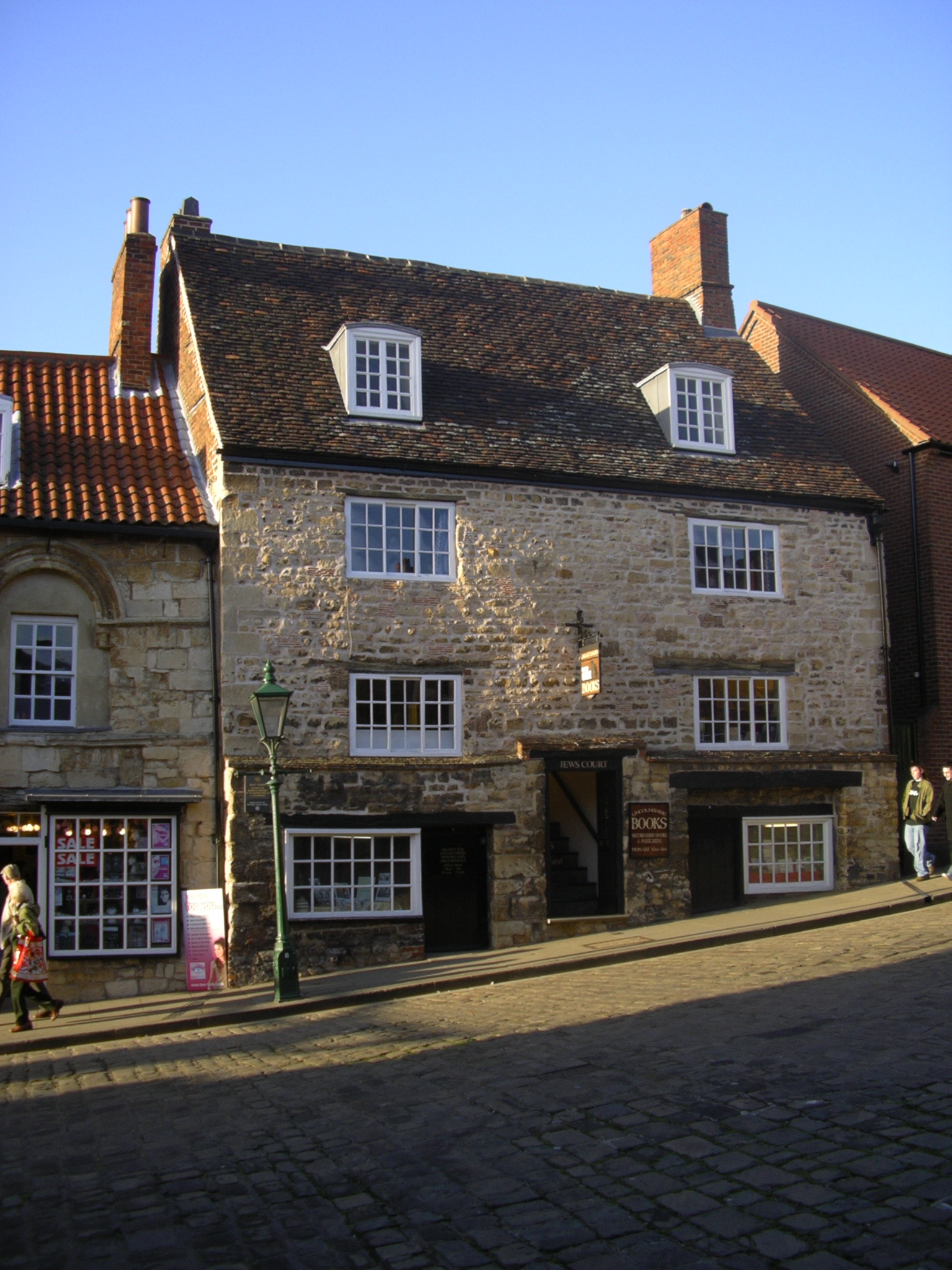
Jew's Court Synagogue, Lincoln, dating from the 12th century

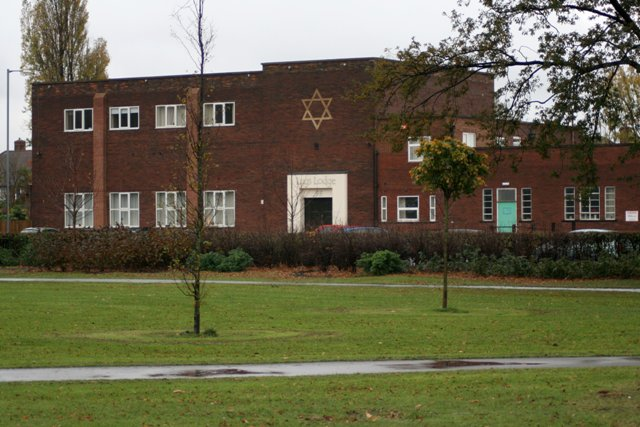
Middlesbrough Hebrew Congregation's synagogue

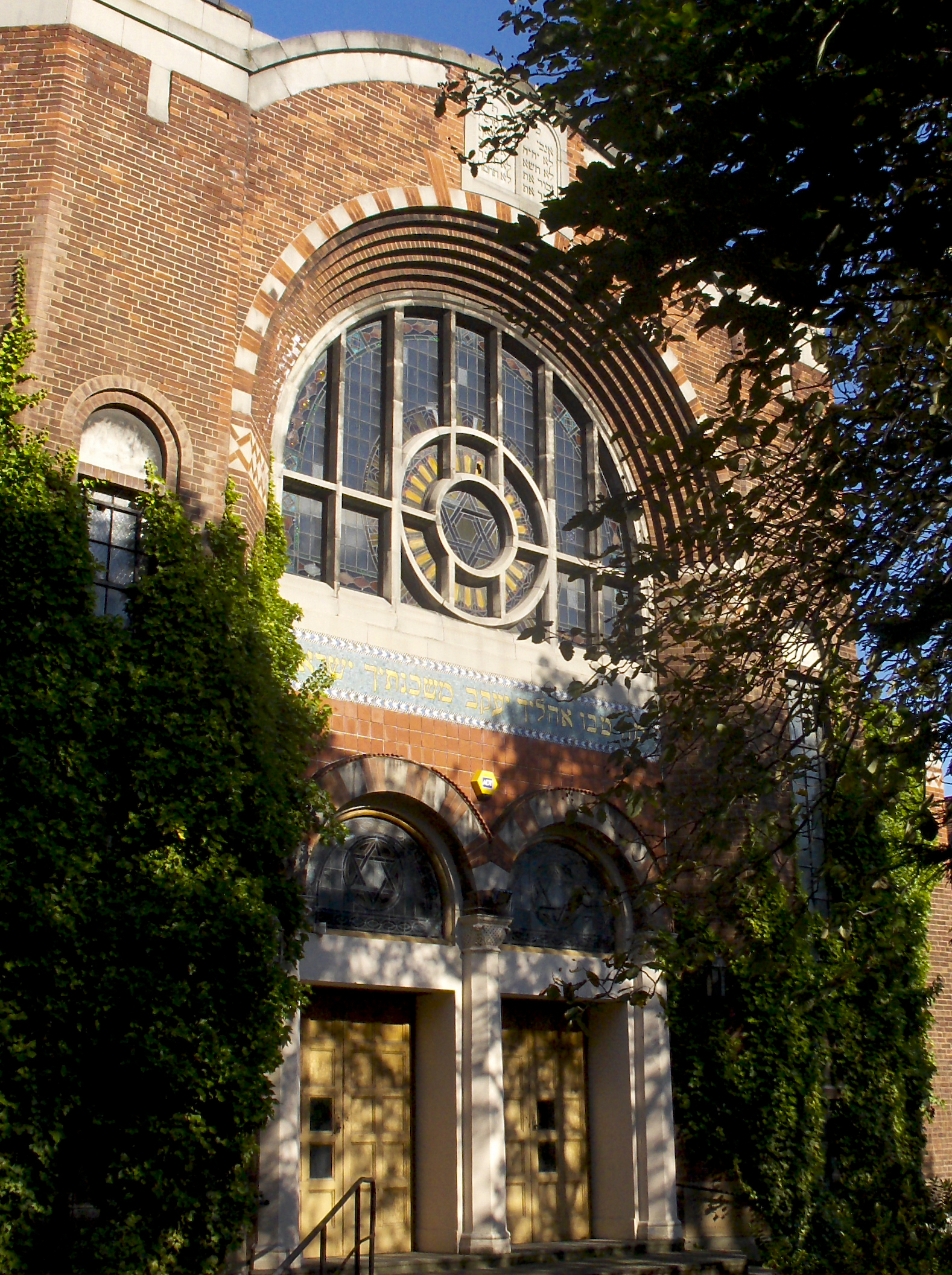
Sunderland Synagogue in 2006, the year the congregation ceased meeting

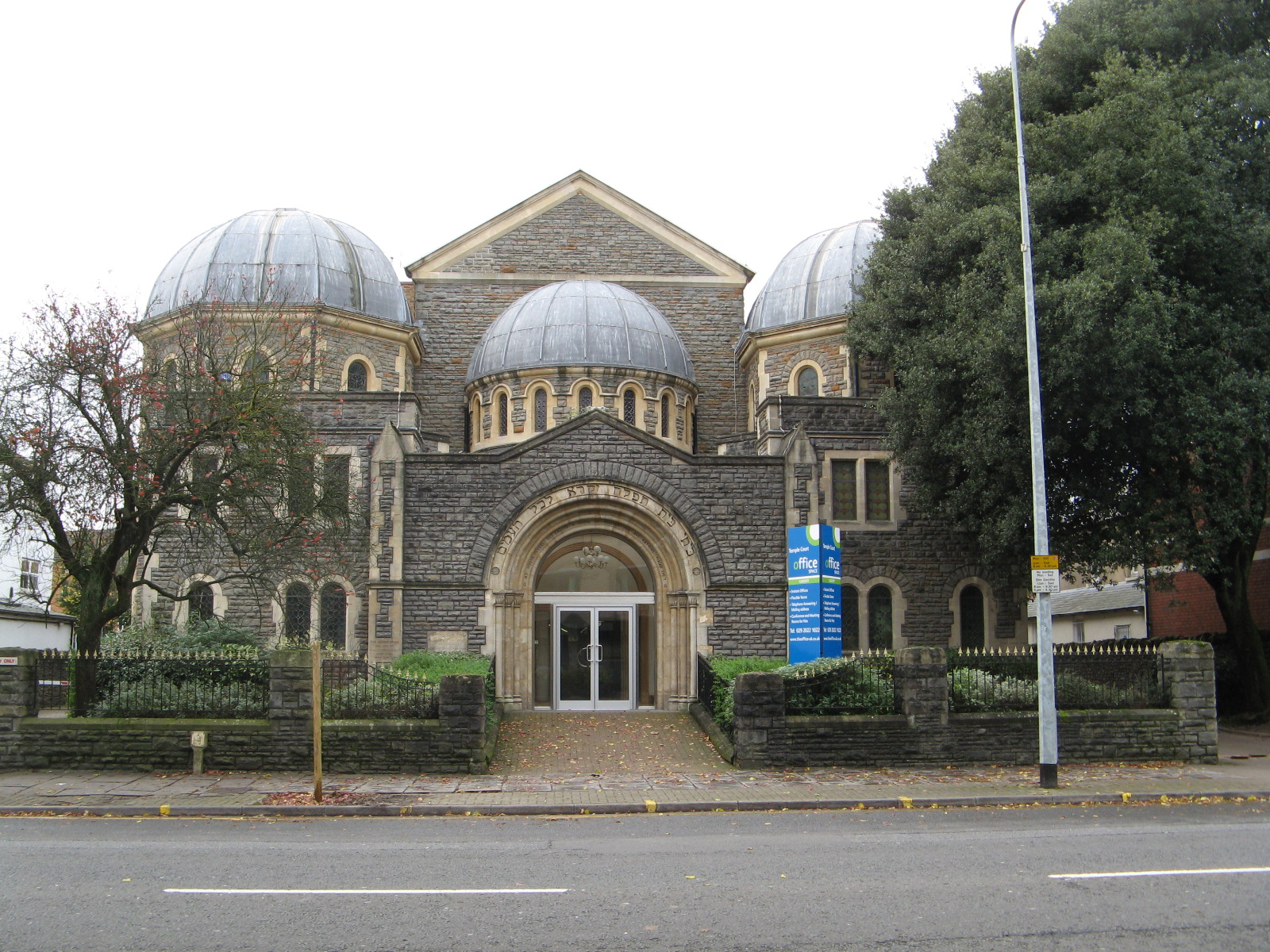
The former Cardiff Old Hebrew Congregation building on Cathedral Road, now an office block. Cardiff's Orthodox congregations have consolidated and meet in a modern building in Cyncoed Gardens

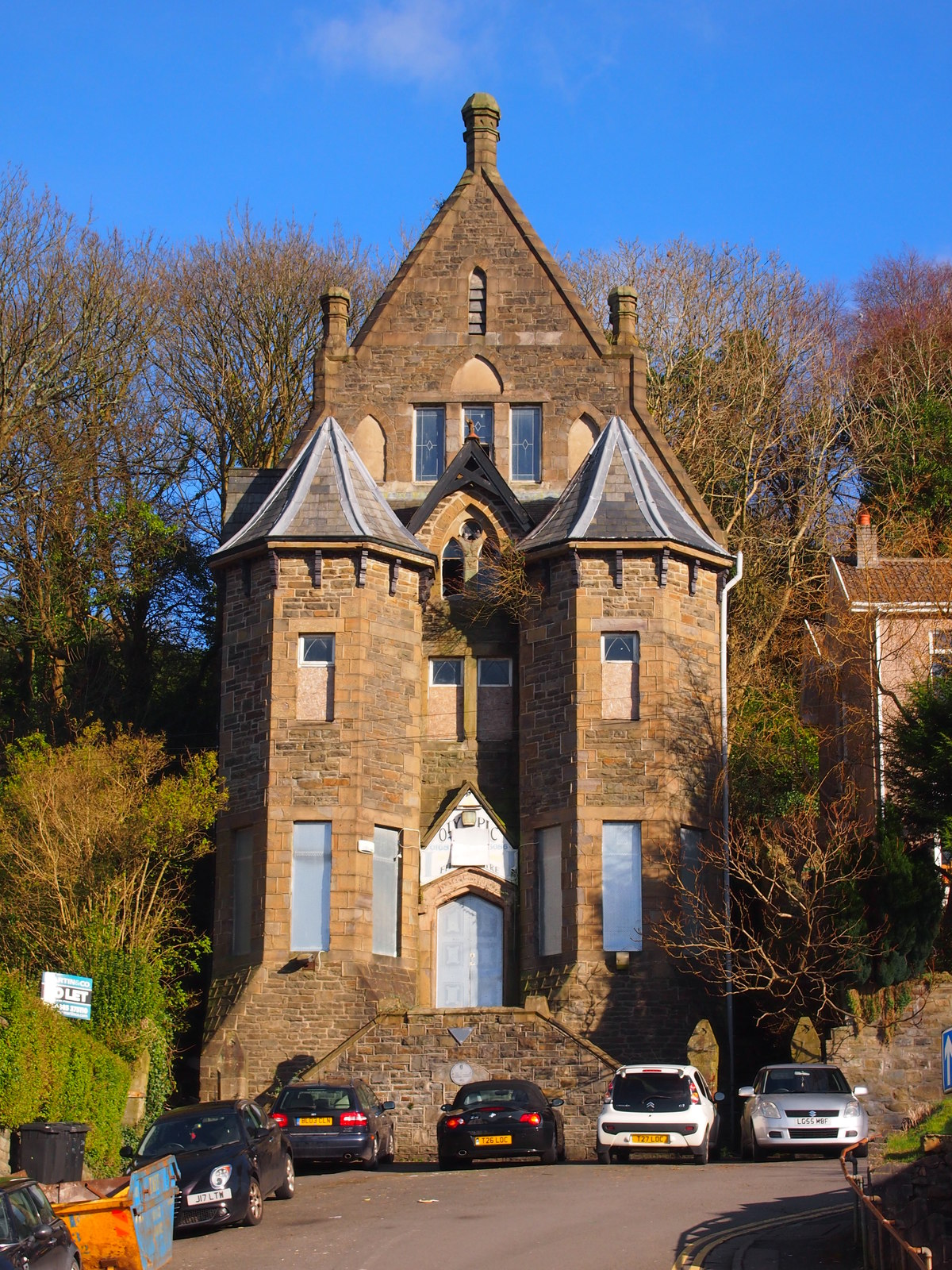
The former Merthyr Synagogue

== See also ==
- List of Jewish communities in the United Kingdom
- Oldest synagogues in the United Kingdom
