= Northampton Medieval Synagogue =

Former synagogue, now remnants, in Northampton, England

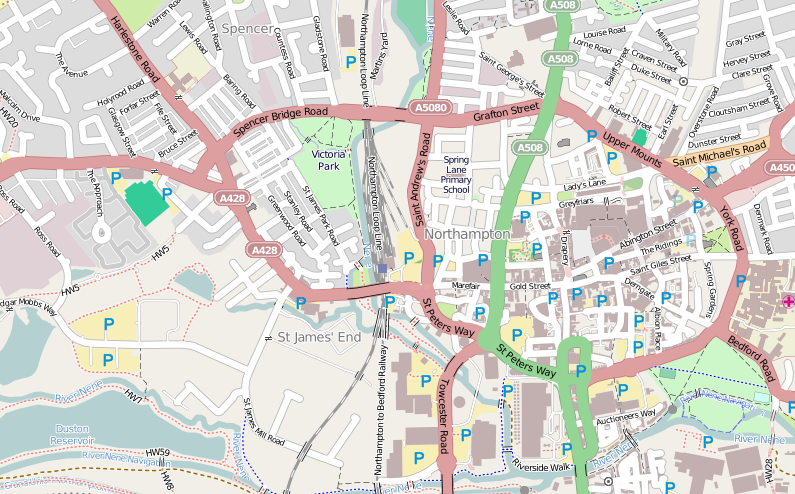
- Location of the former synagogue remnants in central Northampton

Religion
- Affiliation: Judaism (former)
- Ecclesiastical or organizational status: Synagogue (former)
- Status: Closed; remnants only

Location
- Location: Northampton, Northamptonshire, England
- Country: United Kingdom
- Interactive map of Northampton Medieval Synagogue
- Coordinates: 52°14′20″N 0°53′53″W

Architecture
- Completed: c. 1200

The Northampton Medieval Synagogue is an archaeological site that contains remnants of a medieval Jewish synagogue, located in Sheep Street, Northampton, Northamptonshire, England, in the United Kingdom.

The former synagogue site was discovered in 2010 by Marcus Roberts of National Anglo-Jewish Heritage Trail (JTrails) and Caroline Sturdy Colls, a PhD archaeology student at Birmingham University, after researching Northampton's medieval Jewish history. The synagogue appeared to have survived the expulsion of Jews in 1290 and the great fire of Northampton in 1674. Town Clerk records from 1751 described the building as "very substantial; a fair stately hall."

The remains of the medieval synagogue include stone walls and a stone staircase located 3.7 metres (12 ft) below a kebab shop, named the Kebabish takeaway, and a neighbourhood pub, named "The Bear". A wall in the cellar of the pub was part of the medieval synagogue.

Northampton was among the largest medieval Jewish communities in England. In 1992, remnants of a 12th-century Jewish cemetery were discovered by archaeologists.

== See also ==
- History of the Jews in England
- List of former synagogues in the United Kingdom
- Oldest synagogues in the United Kingdom
