= Jesmond Synagogue =

Former Orthodox synagogue in Newcastle, England

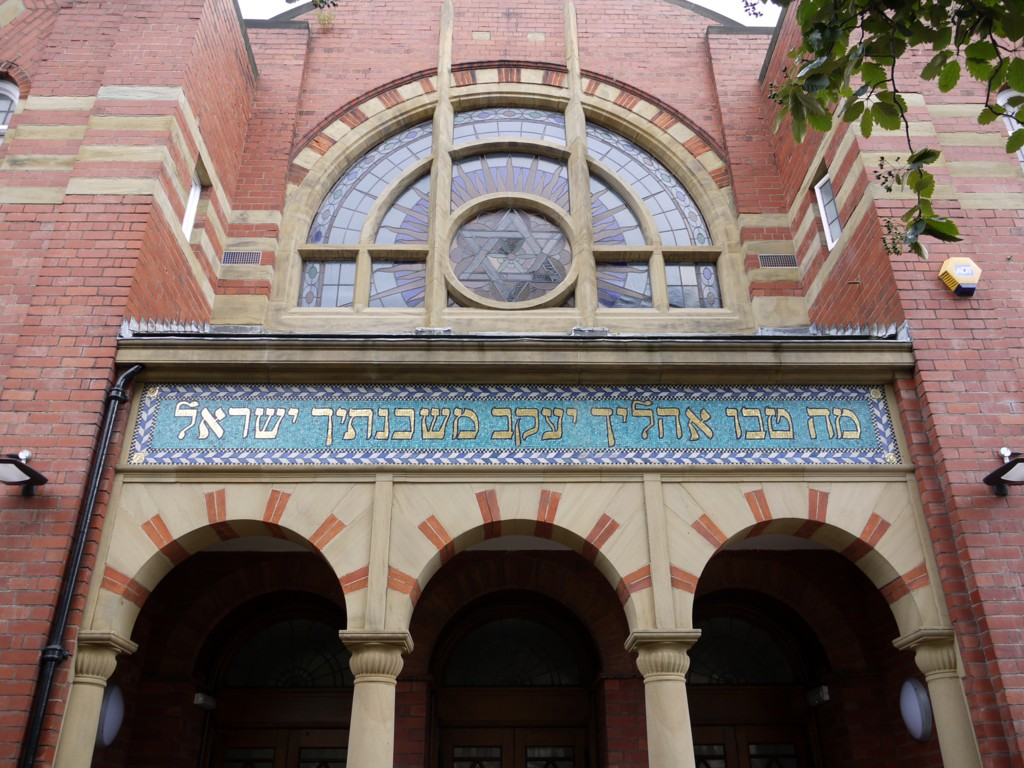
- The former synagogue, now Byzantine House, in 2013

- Location of the former synagogue in Tyne and Wear

Religion
- Affiliation: Orthodox Judaism (former)
- Rite: Nusach Ashkenaz
- Ecclesiastical or organizational status: Synagogue (1915–1986)
- Status: Closed; and repurposed

Location
- Location: Eskdale Terrace, Jesmond, Newcastle upon Tyne, Tyne and Wear, England
- Country: United Kingdom
- Interactive map of Jesmond Synagogue
- Coordinates: 54°59′08″N 1°36′26″W

Architecture
- Architect: Marcus Kenneth Glass
- Type: Synagogue architecture
- Style: Byzantine Revival; Art Deco
- Established: 1914 (as a congregation)
- Completed: 1915

Jesmond Synagogue, now known as Byzantine House, is a former Orthodox Jewish congregation and synagogue, located on Eskdale Terrace, in the Jesmond neighbourhood of Newcastle upon Tyne, in northeast England, in the United Kingdom. Established in 1914, the congregation worshiped in the Ashkenazi rite, until its closure in 1986.

The synagogue building was completed in 1915 and was used up until 1986, when a new synagogue building was completed in Culzean Park.

== History ==
It was originally conceived as a branch of the Leazes Park Synagogue for families who had moved out of the city centre, and was founded in 1914 as an independent congregation.

The synagogue, on in Jesmond, was built in 1914–15 by Marcus Kenneth Glass in an Art Deco interpretation of Byzantine Revival style.

The porch has a triple arcade and columns with lotus bud capitals. A large, sunburst, stained-glass window fills the huge Byzantine arch of the facade. The brickwork is coursed with alternating beige and red stripes.

The synagogue was closed in 1986. The exterior was carefully conserved; the interior was gutted and renovated for use as a school. It formed part of the Newcastle High School for Girls until 2016, when approval was granted for its conversion into flats.

A commemorative plaque marking the building's previous use as a synagogue was unveiled in July 2019.

== See also ==
- History of the Jews in England
- List of former synagogues in the United Kingdom
