= Dollis Hill Synagogue =

School and former synagogue in Brent, London

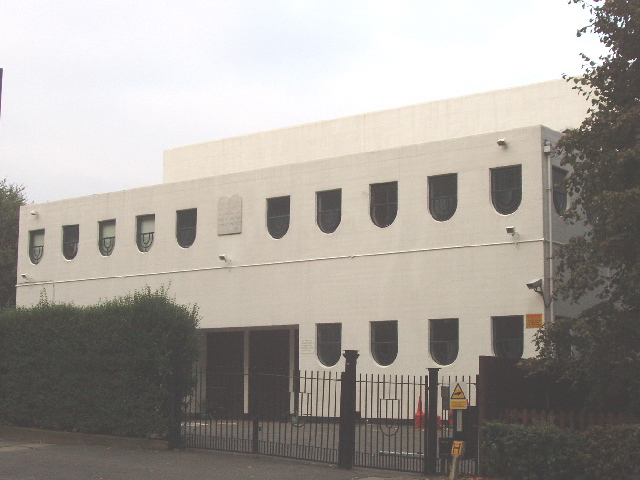
- The former Dollis Hill Synagogue in 2005; used as a school since 1995

- Location of the former synagogue in the London Borough of Brent

Religion
- Affiliation: Orthodox Judaism (former)
- Rite: Nusach Ashkenaz
- Ecclesiastical or organisational status: Synagogue (1938–2011); Primary school (since 1995)

Location
- Location: Dollis Hill Lane, Dollis Hill, Borough of Brent, London, England NW2 6RT
- Country: United Kingdom
- Coordinates: 51°33′31″N 0°13′56″W

Architecture
- Architect: Sir Owen Williams
- Type: Synagogue architecture
- Style: Modernist
- Established: c. 1930s (as a congregation)
- Completed: 1938
- Materials: Concrete

The Dollis Hill Synagogue is a former Orthodox Jewish congregation and synagogue, that is located in Dollis Hill, in the Borough of Brent, London, England, in the United Kingdom. The congregation operated from 1938 until 2011 and worshipped in the Ashkenazi rite.

== History ==
The congregation first came together in the early part of the 20th century, following an increase of Jewish immigration from the European continent to London. The congregation first met in a private house, then began to rent meeting halls in order to accommodate an increase in worshippers. The original synagogue was created in 1933 for £1,400, but the congregation quickly outgrew it and in February 1937 construction began on a larger building.

Designed by Sir Owen Williams, who served as both architect and engineer on the project, the completed two-storey concrete structure was designed to accommodate 324 men at ground level and 316 women at gallery level. The synagogue's design featured two unusual window patterns that were meant to suggest Jewish religious symbolism: a hexagon, which Williams meant to suggest the Star of David, and an inverted arch, which was inspired by the outline of a seven-candle menorah. Although the building was consecrated in 1938 as a district member of the United Synagogue, the congregation expressed displeasure with the finished structure and Williams returned a portion of his design fee in view of this dissatisfaction.

In January 1947, Dollis Hill Synagogue was one of several London synagogues that were vandalised following news of the whipping of kidnapped British troops by Jewish terrorists in the British Mandate of Palestine. Religious books were destroyed by an incensed crowd and graffiti bearing the message "You whip, we burn" was scrawled on the wall.

=== Sale of building and use as a school ===
In June 1993, Dollis Hill Synagogue was one of seven British congregations named by United Synagogue as having had “chronic deficits.” By this period, the congregation’s numbers had dropped to 300 families, with half of the congregation over the age of 70.

In February 1995, the building was sold to the organizers of the Avigdor Hirsch Torah Temimah Primary School. The synagogue's congregation moved its religious services to a smaller adjacent building. The services subsequently reverted to the use of what had since become the school hall in the original synagogue building. By 2011, and following many years of continuing declining membership, the congregation numbered approximately 130 members, mostly aged over 70, and in many cases no longer living close to the synagogue; and the congregation, which had for some time ceased holding religious services other than on Saturday mornings (the Sabbath) and holy days, found itself unable to muster a regular minyan (quorum) for services. In July 2011 the decision was taken to formally disband the congregation.

== See also ==
- History of the Jews in England
- List of former synagogues in the United Kingdom
