= Merthyr Synagogue =

Grade II listed building in Merthyr Tydfil, Wales

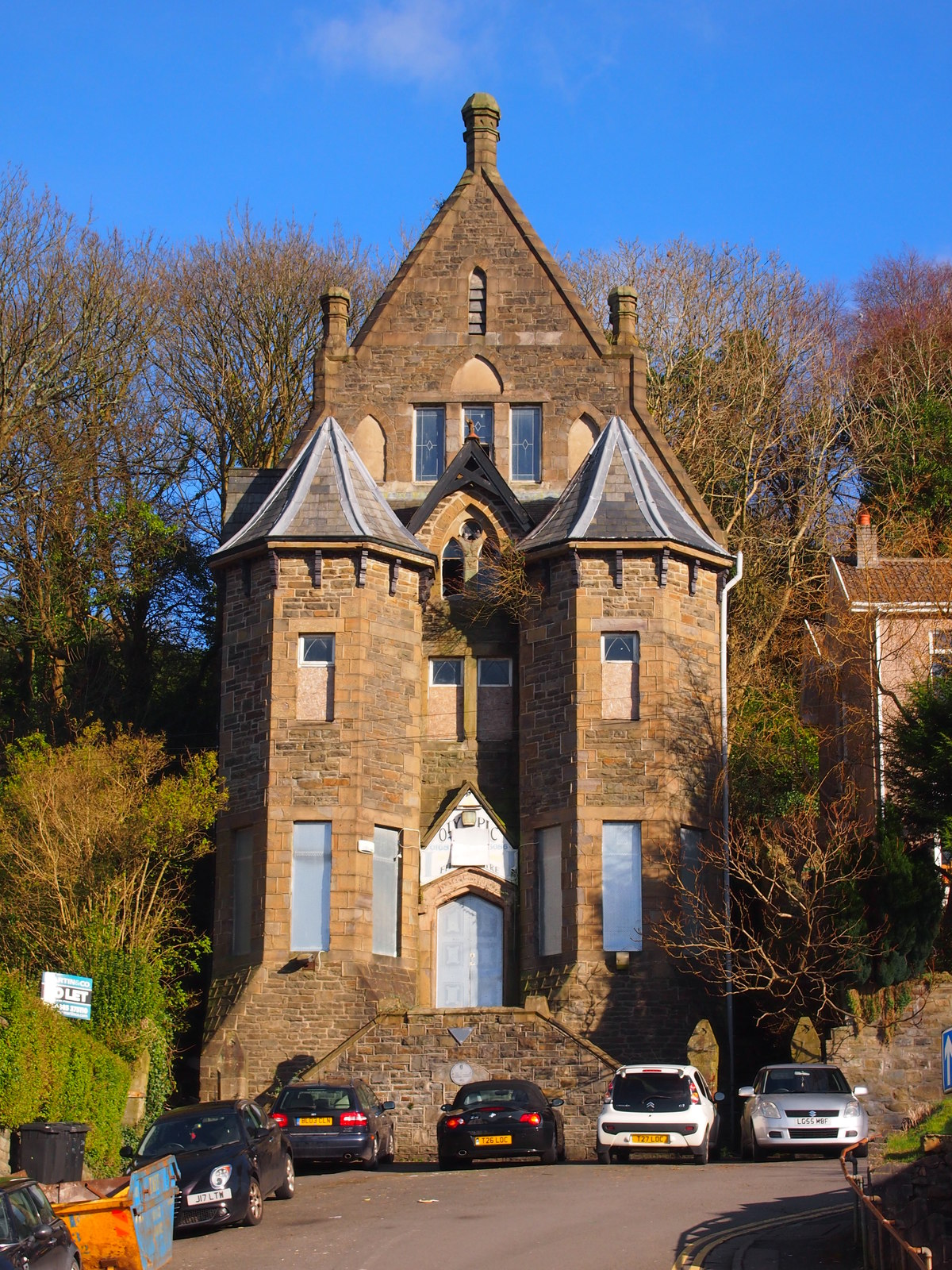
- The former synagogue

- Location of the former synagogue in Wales

Religion
- Affiliation: Judaism (former)
- Ecclesiastical or organisational status: Synagogue (1855–1980s)
- Ownership: Foundation for Jewish Heritage
- Status: Closed; repurposed; restoration commenced in 2019

Location
- Location: Bryntirion Road, Thomastown, Merthyr Tydfil CF47 0ER
- Country: Wales, United Kingdom
- Coordinates: 51°44′49″N 3°22′28″W

Architecture
- Architect: Charles Taylor
- Type: Synagogue architecture
- Style: Gothic Revival
- Established: 1848 (as a congregation)
- Completed: 1870s
- Materials: Stone

Website
- jewishheritage.wales

Listed Building – Grade II
- Official name: Merthyr Christian Centre
- Designated: 16 October 1978 (Grade II*); 1983 (Grade II)
- Reference no.: 11426

Merthyr Synagogue is a former Jewish synagogue located on Bryntirion Road in the Thomastown section of Merthyr Tydfil, Wales. It is a Grade II listed building and is the oldest purpose-built synagogue in existence in Wales.

== History ==
The Jewish congregation of Merthyr Tydfil was established in 1848 at a time when Merthyr was a centre of the Industrial Revolution and the largest town in Wales. The new congregation called itself the "Merthyr Tydfil Hebrew Congregation", and erected its first synagogue in 1852–1855 on John Street. That first building was demolished in the 1990s.

The 1855 building was replaced by the prosperous congregation with the surviving synagogue building in 1877. The congregation had 27 head-of-household members in 1900. The 2011 census recorded four.

The congregation, which had been dwindling, rededicated the synagogue in 1955. In the 1980s, the synagogue was closed and the building was sold and became the Merthyr Christian Centre. In 2006 it was in use as a gymnasium. It came out of use in 2004. In 2008 there was a plan to convert the building into eight residential apartments whilst preserving the exterior of this building.

In 2019 it was bought by the Foundation for Jewish Heritage and is planned to open as a Jewish Heritage Centre in 2025. Essential repairs were undertaken in 2021, part funded by Cadw, to make the building weather-proof.

In 2026 it was announced that, after receiving a grant worth £3.9 million from the National Lottery Heritage Fund, the former synagogue would be transformed into a Heritage Centre telling the story of Jews in Wales.

== Architecture ==
The synagogue is a stone building designed in Gothic Revival style, as were the former synagogues of Llanelli and Pontypridd. Unlike those simpler buildings, the Merthyr Tydfil synagogue is a "Disneyland" fantasy of a building. It was designed by a local architect named Charles Taylor, who was influenced by contemporary buildings such as Castell Coch. The architectural historian Sharman Kadish calls a "double-turreted Gothic folly" and considers it to be "architecturally speaking one of the most important synagogues in the UK."

The building is four storeys high, five when the raised basement is counted. It is crowned by a high gable two storeys tall, capped with stone finials. A double stone staircase rises to the Gothic entrance door. Two storeys above the door there is a pair of Gothic pointed-arch windows. Flanking the door and pointed-arch windows, a pair of hexagonal stone turrets rise three storeys and are topped with hexagonal, conical roofs pointing skyward. As of 2006, the former Torah Ark has been moved into the raised basement where it was being preserved.

The gable is complete with a Welsh dragon; Merthyr may be the only synagogue in the world to feature a dragon perched on the front gable.

In 1960 it was painted by L. S. Lowry. He had painted many places of worship and was visiting Wales at the time. The painting was sold for £277,000 in March 2022.

In 1978 the building was given Grade II* listing, changed to Grade II in 1983.

== See also ==
- History of the Jews in Wales
- List of former synagogues in the United Kingdom
- List of synagogues in the United Kingdom
- Oldest synagogues in the United Kingdom
