= Fieldgate Street Great Synagogue =

Former synagogue in the East End of London, England

- Hebrew: שער יעקב
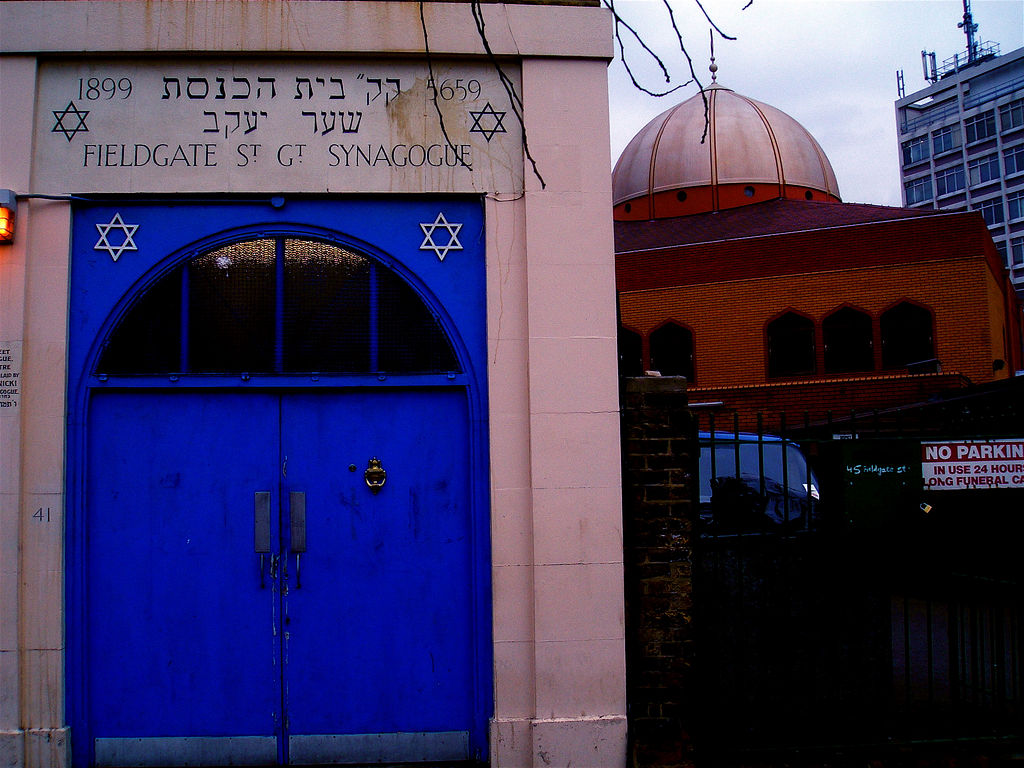
- The entrance to the former synagogue

- Location of the former synagogue in the London Borough of Tower Hamlets

Religion
- Affiliation: Orthodox Judaism (former)
- Rite: Nusach Ashkenaz
- Ecclesiastical or organisational status: Synagogue (1899–2014); Mosque (since 2015)
- Status: Closed

Location
- Location: 41 Fieldgate Street, Whitechapel, Borough of Tower Hamlets, East End, London, England E1 1JU
- Country: United Kingdom
- Coordinates: 51°31′02″N 0°03′55″W

Architecture
- Architect: William Whiddington
- Type: Synagogue architecture
- Funded by: Samuel Montagu
- Established: c. 1897 (as a congregation)
- Completed: 1899

Fieldgate Street Great Synagogue, (Hebrew: שער יעקב, romanized: Sha’ar Ya’akov, lit. 'Gate of Jacob'), is a former Orthodox Jewish congregation and synagogue, located at 41 Fieldgate Street, Whitechapel, in the Borough of Tower Hamlets, in the East End of London, England, in the United Kingdom. Established in 1899, the congregation worshiped in the Ashkenazi rite. The synagogue building was sold in 2015 and it has since operated as a mosque.

== Original building plan ==
A ‘house’ in front of the synagogue, three stories high, comprised a shop, a first-floor caretaker’s flat and a top-floor committee room. To the right of the shopfront, double iron gates opened outwards for two entrances, as a synagogue requires segregation of men and women:

The women's door led directly to a staircase accessing the gallery, and the men's led to a corridor to the main floor of the synagogue behind. The synagogue itself was in a spacious, well-lit and ventilated, long room which could accommodate for 280 men below and 240 women in the three-sided gallery. On two tiers of paired Corinthian columns, the ceiling rose to a part-glazed seven-sided central vault. The bimah (reading platform) was in the centre, flanked by high-backed benches on the long walls. Extra rows were inserted behind the bimah. The ark (containing the Torah scrolls) was set against the back wall at the north end, it had a tall upper tier with large luhot (Decalogue tablets) flanked by lions of Judah and topped by a semi-dome. Above it was a large round window. It did not point to Jerusalem as is traditional, as it was impractical to do so with the building's south orientation.

== History ==
The synagogue was built with a ninety-year lease of land previously occupied by a private house and workshop that served as a home of ginger-beer maker and a tea chest dealer. This was part of a synagogue project by the Federation of Synagogues, which oversaw the amalgamation of three small chevras through appeals that condemned existing premises as unsuitable for public worship. Building costs were estimated at £3,500, from which the Federation of Synagogues contributed £500, private members raised £700 and Samuel Montagu put down at least £200 of his own money.

Upon establishment, Montagu was made honorary president, while Nathaniel Charles Rothschild performed the opening ceremony. Solomon Michaels, a clothier, was the acting president. William Whiddington, a city-based architect, was commissioned to design the synagogue, to comply with an Ashkenazi shul tradition.

=== After WWII ===
The synagogue was badly damaged during the Blitz as many structures in the East End were. A first phase of essential repair with new steel-work and concrete roofing for the main hall was carried out in 1947–8 through Lewis Solomon & Son, architects, with S. H. & D. E. White, civil engineers, and R. H. Rhodes Ltd, builder. Work on the hall and gallery, retaining the Corinthian columns, was completed in 1952 by Ashby and Horner Ltd, builders, under the oversight of another successor firm, Lewis Solomon, Son & Joseph, and the synagogue’s chairman, Nathan Zlotnicki. The 'house' in front of the synagogue was refurbished as a ‘communal centre’ during 1959–60, Ashby & Horner giving it a reconfigured ground-floor layout and a plain front, brick above a rendered lower storey. New dedicatory inscriptions were put in place above and beside the main entrance.

Under the leadership of the Rev. Leibish Gayer, the refurbishment kept the humbleness of the old building. The passage along the east wall led into the shul where the marbled columns and some old pews survived, the remade ark bore humbler luhot and carved and gilt-painted Lions of Judah. To the left of the ark was a stone Royal Family prayer tablet, a tradition imported from seventeenth-century Amsterdam that is common in more Anglicised synagogues. Above the ark two high-level round windows were given Star of David stained glass. There were also Star of David light fittings, and a large ceiling lantern lit the whole space. Panelled gallery fronts served as donation boards, bearing commemorative inscriptions.

=== In the 2000s ===
By the early 2000s, the synagogue had a reduced capacity of just 150, and attendances continued to fall gradually as the local Jewish population in the East End declined. A movable curtained trellis mechitzah was installed at the rear of the ground floor for a dwindling number of elderly women, so that they no longer had to climb the stairs to attend at the original women section on the second level.

By November 2009, regular services were stopped, and the synagogue was open only once a month for a symbolic Shabbat services.

The Federation of Synagogues sold the building to the East London Mosque in 2015 which had by then enclosed the small synagogue building which was dwarfed by it. In a conversion of 2016 designed by Makespace Architects, furnishings were removed and a new shopfront was created for a Zakat Centre (for the receipt of donations to charity). The Fieldgate Street Great Synagogue was the last active synagogue in Whitechapel proper.

The former synagogue building was purchased by the East London Mosque in July 2015.

== See also ==
- History of the Jews in England
- List of former synagogues in the United Kingdom
