= Pesach Eliyahu Falk =

English rabbi (1943–2020)

Rabbi Pesach Eliyahu Falk
- Falk in 2008

Personal life
- Born: 1943 Manchester, England
- Died: 20 January 2020 (aged 76–77) Gateshead, England
- Buried: Har HaMenuchot
- Education: Brisk Yeshiva

Religious life
- Religion: Judaism
- Denomination: Haredi

Pesach Eliyahu Falk (1943 – 20 January 2020) was an English Haredi rabbi and posek. He was well known for his works on Jewish law concerning the laws of modesty and Shabbos.

== Biography ==
Falk was born in Manchester, England in 1943 to Avraham Tzvi and Sarah, both Holocaust survivors. He studied at the Manchester and Sunderland yeshivas, and later at the Brisk Yeshiva in Jerusalem under Rabbi Berel Soloveitchik. He married Esther Steinhaus, daughter of Shraga Steinhaus of Gateshead, and relocated to Gateshead where he studied in the Gateshead Kolel.

After several years, Falk began teaching at the Gateshead Seminary, where he delivered lectures on the laws of Shabbos and modesty and hashkafa. He also taught at Gateshead Yeshiva, giving classes on the laws of Shabbos and blessings, as well as at the Beis Chaya Rochel seminary. Over the course of a week, he would deliver on average 25 lectures.

Falk was a pioneer in the field of halachic awareness regarding insects in fruits and vegetables, a topic that was not widely understood at the time.

His book Modesty: An Adornment for Life took ten years to write and has sold over 100,000 copies in five languages.

Falk died on January 20, 2020, and was buried in Jerusalem on Har HaMenuchot.

== Family ==
Falk had 14 children. One of his children, Rabbi Moshe Falk, is a maggid shiur in Yeshivas Nachlas Tzvi in Toronto. His sister Rebbetzin Miriam Salomon was married to Rabbi Matisyahu Salomon until her death in 2016. Another sister is married to Dayan AD Dunner, a prominent rabbi and posek in Stamford Hill, London.

== Works ==
- Modesty: An Adornment for Life (1998), ISBN 978-0-87306-874-1.
- Modesty: An Adornment for Life: Educational Diagrams for the Use of Women and Girls (Supplement; 1998)
- Modesty: An Adornment For Life: Day By Day (two volumes)
- Chosson and Kallah during their Engagement (2001), ISBN 1-58330-471-1
- Honoring Shabbos During the Week (1988)
- Halachos and Attitudes Concerning the Dress of Women and Girls (1993)
- Sheitels: A Halachic Guide to Present-day Sheitels (2002)
- Halachic Guide to the Inspection of Fruits and Vegetables for Insects (1978)
- She'eilos U'Teshuvos Machzeh Eliyahu (Hebrew)
- Zachor V'Shamor: The Laws of Shabbos (four volumes)
- Hilchos Shabbos L'maaseh (Hebrew; 2015)
