= Dalston Synagogue =

Jewish synagogue in North London 1885-1970

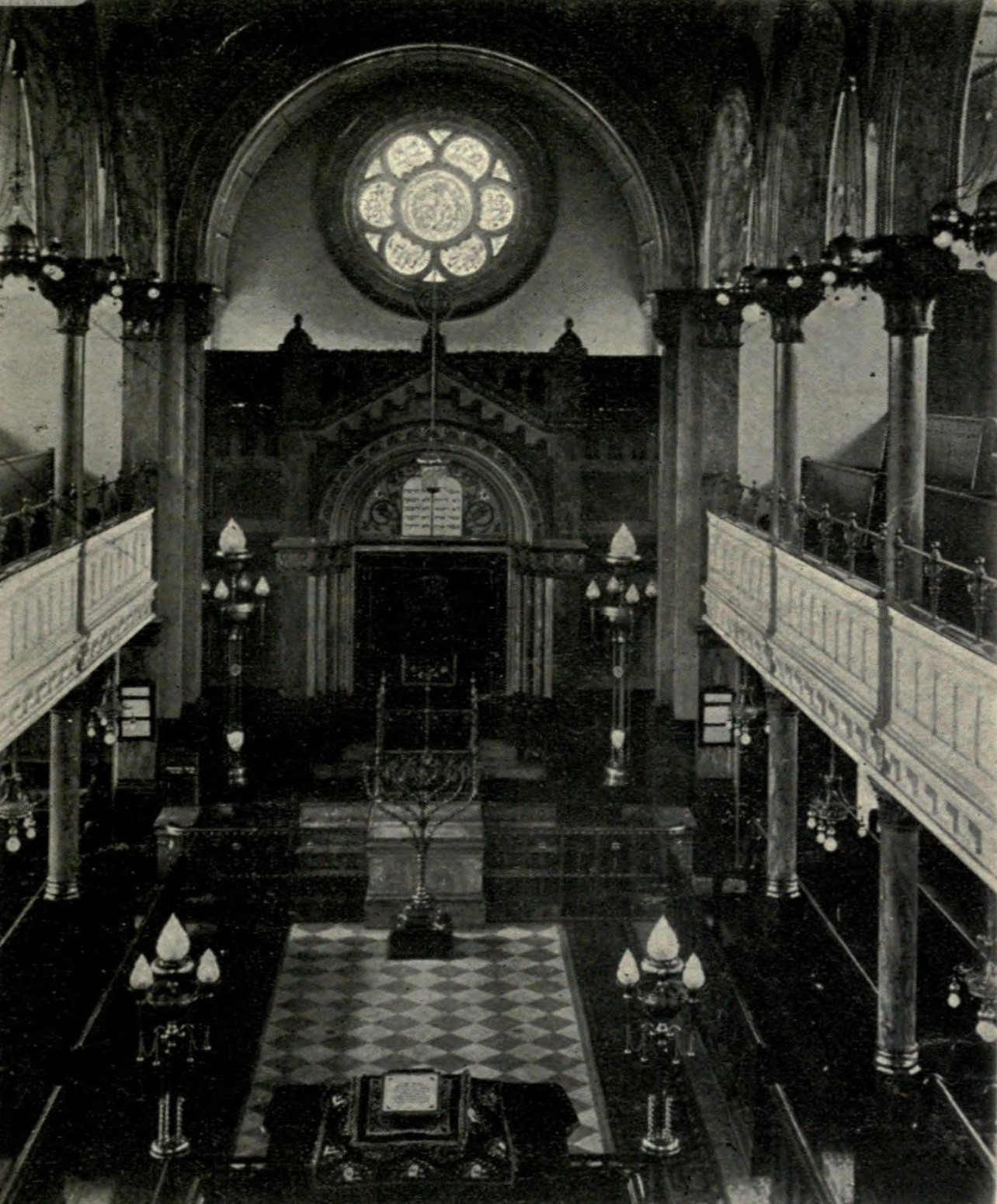
- Interior of the former synagogue in 1910

- Location of the former synagogue in the London Borough of Islington

Religion
- Affiliation: Orthodox Judaism (former)
- Ecclesiastical or organizational status: Synagogue (1885–1967)
- Status: Closed; and demolished

Location
- Location: Poet's Road, Canonbury, Borough of Islington, North London, England W5
- Country: United Kingdom
- Interactive map of Dalston Synagogue
- Coordinates: 51°33′06″N 0°05′12″W

Architecture
- Established: 3 May 1874 (as a congregation)
- Completed: 1885
- Demolished: 1970

The Dalston Synagogue (also known as the Poets Road Synagogue) was an Orthodox Jewish congregation and synagogue, located on Poet's Road, Canonbury, in the Borough of Islington, North London, England, in the United Kingdom. After formation in 1874, the congregation worshiped in the Poet's Road synagogue from 1885 until its closure in 1967. The congregation worshiped in the Ashkenazi rite.

== History ==
Jews fleeing the pogroms of the Russian Empire, and those beginning to leave the East End of London and move northwards towards Stoke Newington and Stamford Hill established a congregation in the neighbourhood by 1876. The Victorian Gothic building was erected in Poets Road in 1885, a street just outside the boundaries of Dalston, and became one of the leading members of the United Synagogues.

Jacob Koussevitzsky, a member of the famous Koussevitzky cantorial family, was its cantor from 1936, though another source says the 1950s.

At its height, the Poets Road Synagogue had hundreds of worshippers; it closed in the late 1960s, as the remaining Jewish population moved further afield. The synagogue site was eventually sold and the building, along with its stained glass windows, was demolished in 1970 and replaced by a block of council flats, leaving no trace of the Jewish life which existed in this area.

== Religious leaders and clergy ==
After World War II Joseph Rabinowitz became the rabbi. After he retired Isaac Newman, formerly of the St Albans Synagogue, replaced him. His appointment coincided with the amalgamation of the synagogue with the North London synagogue in Lofting Road. He left after conflict with his own synagogue lay leadership and with the United Synagogue over the Louis Jacobs affair, in which Newman supported Jacobs.

== See also ==
- History of the Jews in England
- List of former synagogues in the United Kingdom
