= Harold Reay =

English footballer

Personal information
- Date of birth: 1896
- Place of birth: Sunderland, England
- Date of death: 14 May 1959 (aged 62–63)
- Height: 5 ft 10 1/2 in (1.79 m)
- Position: Winger

Senior career*
Years	Team	Apps	(Gls)
1918–1922	Margate		
1922–1923	Sunderland	0	(0)
1923–1924	Preston North End	1	(0)
1924–1925	Grimsby Town	1	(0)
- * Club domestic league appearances and goals

Harold Reay (1896 – 14 May 1959) was an English professional footballer who played as a winger.
