= Leazes Park Synagogue =

Former Orthodox synagogue in Newcastle, England

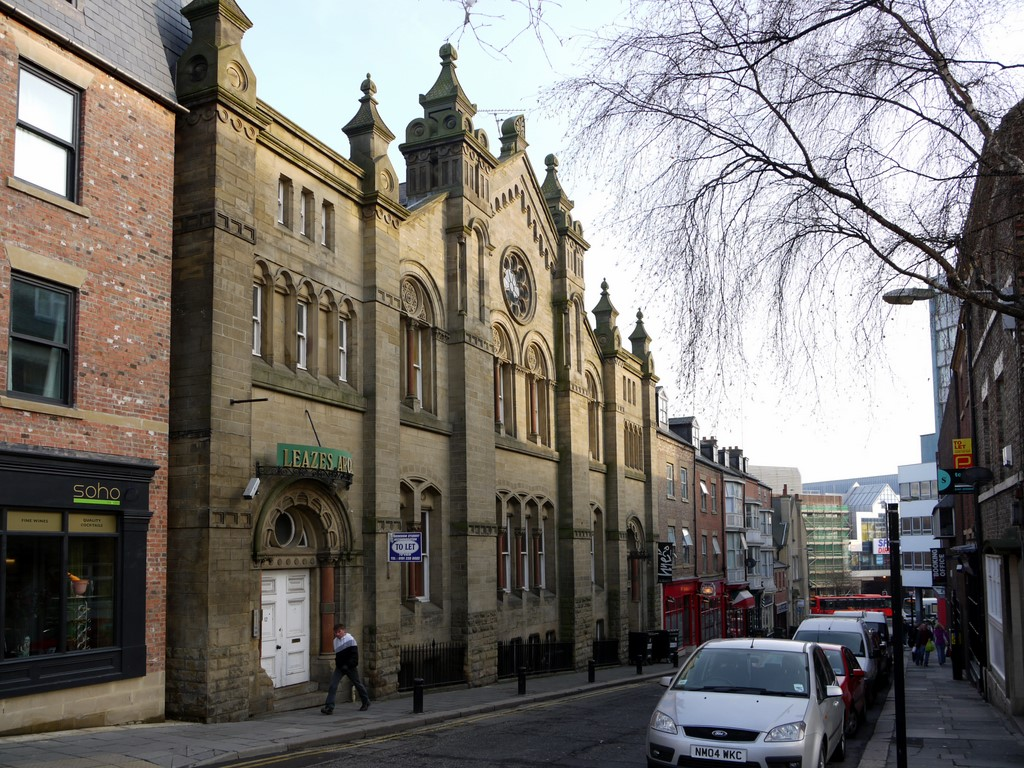
- The former Leazes Park Synagogue in 2013

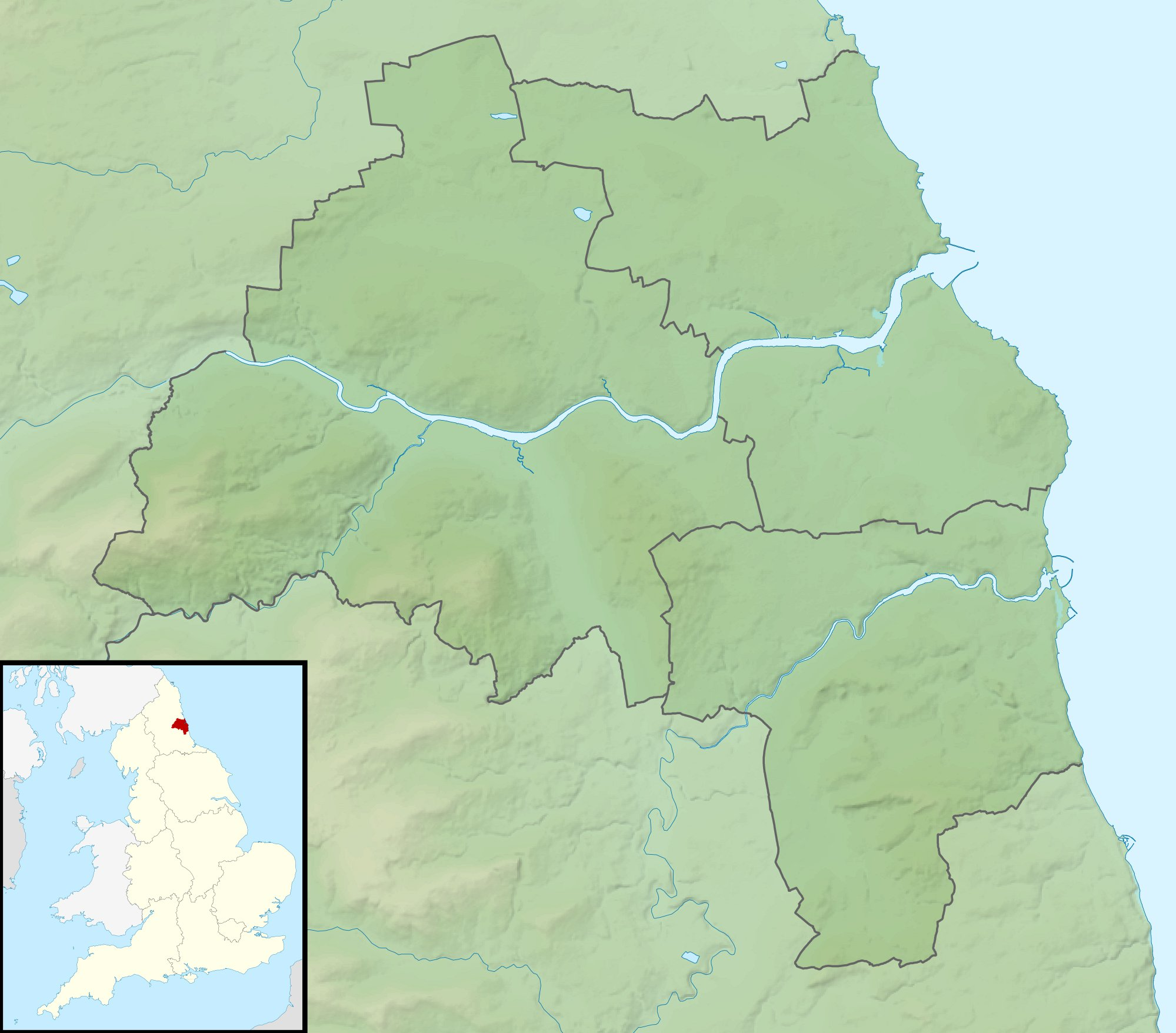
- Location of the former synagogue in Tyne and Wear

Religion
- Affiliation: Orthodox Judaism (former)
- Rite: Nusach Ashkenaz
- Ecclesiastical or organizational status: Synagogue (1880–1978); Student accommodation (since c. 1996)
- Status: Closed (as a synagogue); Repurposed

Location
- Location: 12 Leazes Park Road, Newcastle upon Tyne, England NE1 4PF
- Country: United Kingdom
- Interactive map of Leazes Park Synagogue
- OS National Grid: NZ 2457 6457
- Coordinates: 54°58′31″N 1°37′04″W

Architecture
- Architect: John Johnstone
- Type: Synagogue architecture
- Style: North Italian
- Established: 1880 (as a congregation)
- Completed: 1880
- Materials: Sandstone; Welsh slate

Listed Building – Grade II
- Official name: Leazes Arcade
- Type: Listed building
- Designated: 30 March 1987
- Reference no.: 1087064

The Leazes Park Synagogue is a former Orthodox Jewish congregation and synagogue, located at 12 Leazes Park Road, Newcastle upon Tyne, England, in the United Kingdom. The congregation was formed in 1880 and worshiped in the Ashkenazi rite until the congregation was dissolved in 1978.

The former synagogue building was completed in 1880, designed by Scottish architect John Johnstone in the North Italian style, and featured an elaborate two-storey sandstone façade. The building was listed as a Grade II building in 1987.

Since its use as a synagogue, the building has been variously used as a shopping arcade and as student accommodation.

== History ==
The Newcastle Old Hebrew Congregation traces its roots from 1838 and the founding of Temple Street Synagogue, which merged with the Charlotte Square Synagogue to form the Newcastle United Hebrew Congregation. The amalgamated congregation moved into the new synagogue on Leazes Park Road, which was consecrated on 25 August 1880. There were further mergers in 1924 and 1973, but the Leazes Park Synagogue continued to serve as one of the synagogues of the united congregation until its final closure service on 3 May 1978. The Culzean Park Synagogue in Gosforth is now Newcastle's only active Orthodox synagogue.

Designed by John Johnstone, who was also responsible for the design of Newcastle's old town hall, the synagogue building was extended in the 1920s. The building had a basement schoolroom and a Jewish sports club was formed there in 1934.

The Leazes Park Synagogue building was put to use as a shopping arcade until a fire destroyed the interior in 1989. Restoration was completed by 1996 and it is now used for student accommodation.

== See also ==
- History of the Jews in North East England
- List of former synagogues in the United Kingdom
