= Shammai Zahn =

Polish-born British rabbi (1920–2001)

Rabbi Shammai Zahn

Personal life
- Born: Siegfried Zahn; 6 July 1920 Nuremberg, Germany
- Died: 4 March 2001 (aged 80) Gateshead, United Kingdom
- Buried: Hazlerigg
- Spouse: Lotte Bergman (m. 1945)

Religious life
- Religion: Judaism

Jewish leader
- Position: Rosh yeshiva
- Yeshiva: Sunderland Yeshiva
- Began: 1949

Shammai Zahn (6 July 1920 – 4 March 2001) was a Polish-born rabbi who was the chief rabbi of the Jewish community of Sunderland, United Kingdom and rosh yeshiva of the Sunderland Yeshiva.

== Early life ==
Zahn was born in Nuremberg, Germany, in 1920 to Meshulam Zushe and Pessel Zirel Zahn. He held Polish citizenship. He began his education at the Würzburg teachers' seminary, but fled to Britain in 1939, escaping the persecution of Jews in Nazi Germany.

== Education and career ==
Zahn studied in Yeshivas Toras Emes in London under Rabbi Moshe Schneider. In 1944, he joined the newly established Kollel in Gateshead as its sole unmarried student. The following year, he married Lotte Bergman, also a refugee. He helped the founding of the Sunderland Yeshiva in 1946 and served as its Rosh yeshiva from approximately 1949 until his death in 2001.

Zahn made annual trips to Morocco from 1950 to 1967 to recruit students, impacting the education of future chief rabbis of Argentina and Venezuela, as well as dayanim and communal rabbis around the world.

In 1966, Zahn became the Rabbi of the Sunderland Beth Hamedrash. In 1981, he became the first and only communal Rabbi of Sunderland, holding the position until his death.

In the early 1990s, Zahn was appointed as president of Agudas Yisroel UK.

== Later years ==
Zahn retired to Gateshead in 1999, where he lived until his death on 4 March 2001. A memorial brochure was published by the Sunderland Yeshiva, now based in Gateshead, in honour of Zahn after his death.

== Works ==
Zahn wrote V'gam Lishmonah on machshovah and Beis Shammai on the Torah.
