= Sunderland Synagogue =

Former synagogue in Sunderland, England

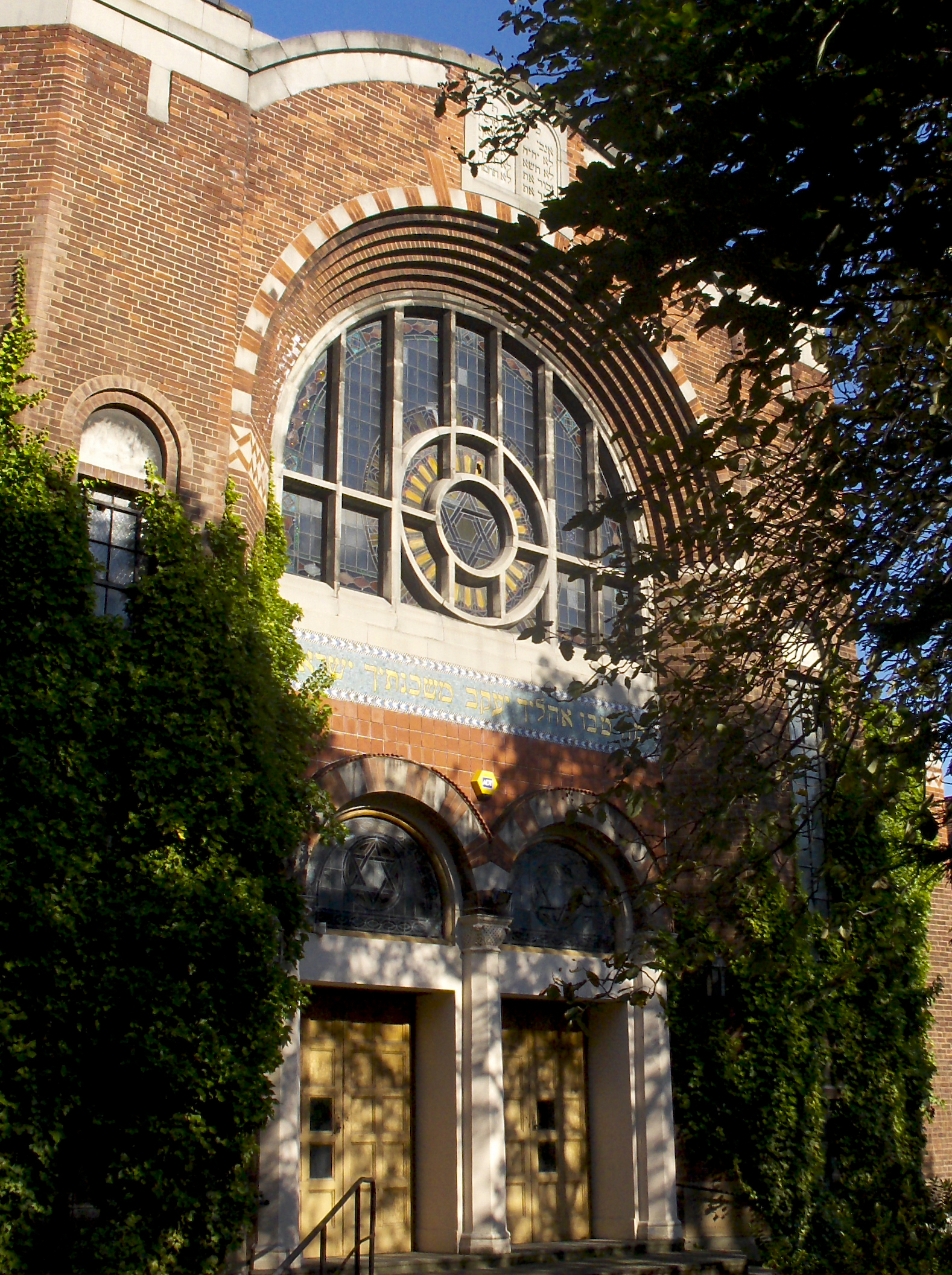
- The former synagogue in 2006, the year the congregation ceased meeting

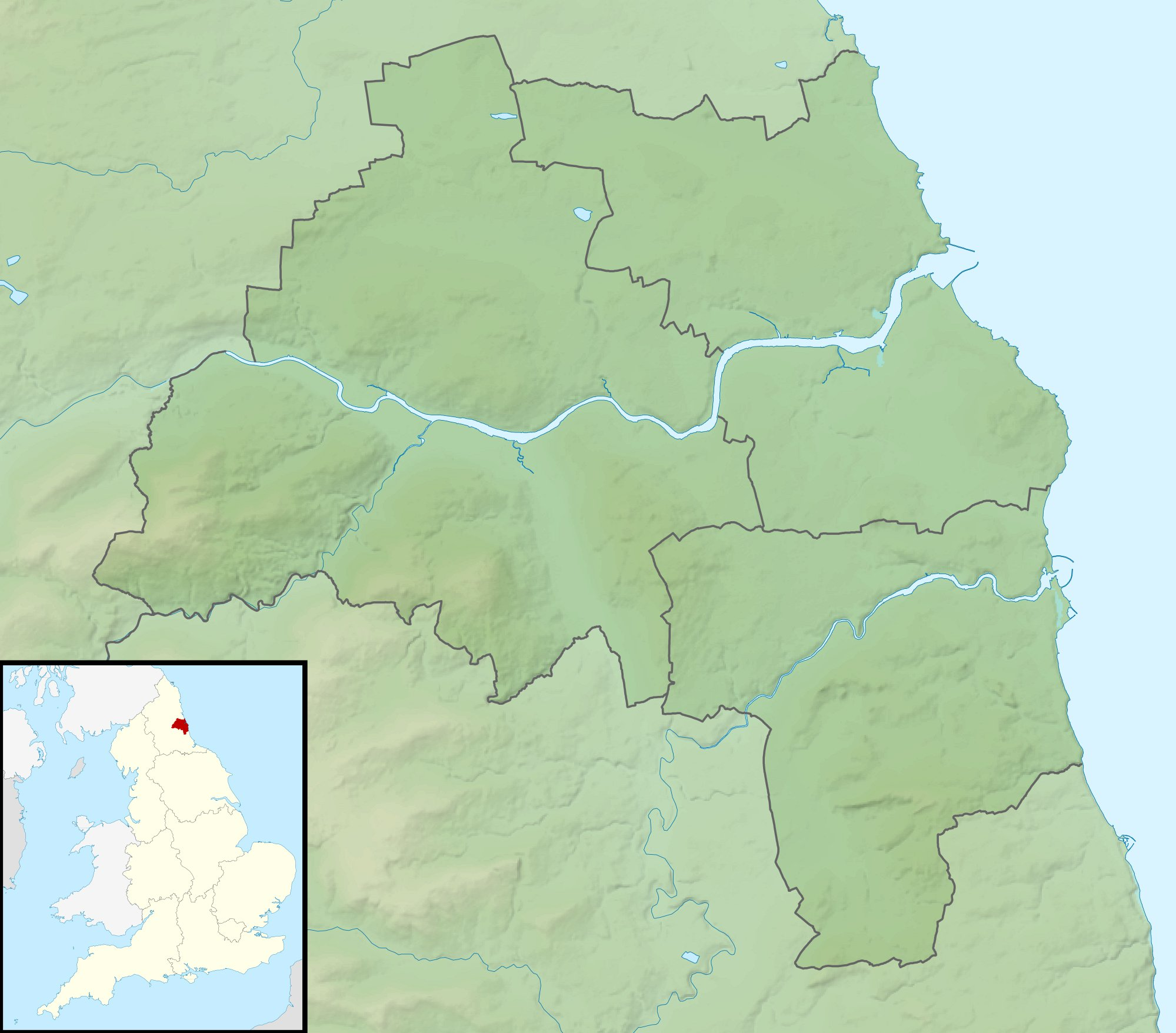
- Location of the former synagogue in Tyne and Wear

Religion
- Affiliation: Orthodox Judaism (former)
- Rite: Nusach Ashkenaz
- Ecclesiastical or organizational status: Synagogue (1928–2006)
- Status: Closed (as a synagogue); vacant

Location
- Location: Ryhope Road, Sunderland, Tyne and Wear, England
- Country: United Kingdom
- Interactive map of Sunderland Synagogue
- Coordinates: 54°53′42″N 1°22′44″W

Architecture
- Architect: Marcus Kenneth Glass
- Type: Synagogue architecture
- Style: Byzantine Revival; Art Deco
- General contractor: Joseph Huntley & Son
- Completed: 1928

Listed Building – Grade II
- Official name: Sunderland Synagogue
- Type: Listed building
- Designated: 21 May 1999
- Reference no.: 1387275

The Sunderland Synagogue is a former Orthodox Jewish congregation and synagogue, located on Ryhope Road, in Sunderland, Tyne and Wear, England, in the United Kingdom. The congregation was formed as the Sunderland Hebrew Congregation in 1861 and worshiped in the Ashkenazi rite until the congregation was dissolved in 2006.

The building, in use at the time as a synagogue, was listed as a Grade II building in 1999.

== History ==
The forebears of the congregation date from the establishment of the Polish Synagogue in 1781 and the Sunderland Israelite Congregation, formed in 1821. The two congregations merged, together with several smaller congregations, in 1861 to form the Sunderland Hebrew Congregation and moved into the original Adath Yeshurun synagogue on Moor Street, Sunderland, in 1862.

In 1928, the congregation built a new synagogue, on Ryhope Road, designed by architect Marcus Kenneth Glass, and constructed by Joseph Huntley & Son. It is the last surviving synagogue to be designed by Glass. The synagogue was listed as a Grade II historic structure in 1999. It became Sunderland's main place of Jewish worship once the former Sunderland Beth Hamedresh, on the corner of Mowbray Road and The Oaks West, closed in 1984. The congregation ceased meeting in 2006.

The congregation had earlier sold the building to a Jewish charitable trust in 2000; and leased the building from the trust for a peppercorn rental. In 2009, the trust offered the building for sale or lease. Businessman George Fraser bought the former synagogue building in 2010. Fraser intended to convert the building into twelve luxury apartments whilst retaining the exterior. Local Councillor Mel Spedding said that the planned conversion was considered inappropriate, and a planning application for it had not been received. Spedding stated that he would be happy to discuss the building's future with the owner. As of May 2021 the building was unoccupied.

== Architecture ==
Architectural historian Sharman Kadish described the synagogue's colourful design as a blend of Byzantine Revival and "cinematic art deco style." The exterior is an Art Deco interpretation of Byzantine style, with an oversized, arched entrance, paired arched doorways, polychrome brickwork and basket capitals. Kadish described the interior as "spanned by a deep barrel vault over the central aisle, which was originally painted to imitate a star-spangled sky. The gallery runs around three sides carried on slender iron columns with palmette capitals. The plasterwork Ark canopy is highly decorative, painted and gilded. It is classical in form but features decoration of Islamic and Byzantine origin, especially the cushion capitals to the columns and the chevron patterns on the shafts ..."

== See also ==
- History of the Jews in England
- List of former synagogues in the United Kingdom
