= Albert Oxley =

English footballer

Personal information
- Date of birth: 21 August 1915
- Place of birth: Gateshead, England
- Date of death: 1994 (aged 78–79)
- Height: 5 ft 8 1/2 in (1.74 m)
- Position: Inside forward

Youth career
- Windy Nook

Senior career*
Years	Team	Apps	(Gls)
1934–1947	Gateshead	120	(25)
- * Club domestic league appearances and goals

Albert Oxley (21 October 1915 – 1994) was an English footballer who played as an inside forward.

Oxley played league football for Gateshead between 1934 and 1947, playing a total of 128 games and scoring 26 goals.

== Career statistics ==
Club	Season	League		FA Cup		Third Div. North Cup		Total	
Club	Season	Apps	Goals	Apps	Goals	Apps	Goals	Apps	Goals
Gateshead	1934–35	6	0	0	0	0	0	6	0
Gateshead	1935–36	20	2	0	0	1	1	21	3
Gateshead	1936–37	28	4	2	0	1	0	31	4
Gateshead	1937–38	35	8	0	0	2	0	37	8
Gateshead	1938–39	29	10	1	0	1	0	31	10
Gateshead	1945–46	—		0	0	—		0	0
Gateshead	1946–47	2	1	0	0	—		2	1
Career Total		120	25	3	0	5	1	128	26
