= Torah Temimah Primary School =

Avigdor Hirsch Torah Temimah Primary School

Location
- Parkside; Dollis Hill; London, NW2 6RJ; England; 51.5588°N 0.2325°W

Information
- Former name: Torah Temimah Primary School
- Type: Voluntary aided school
- Religious affiliation: Jewish
- Denomination: Haredi
- Established: 1989
- Local authority: Brent
- Department for Education URN: 131916 Tables
- Ofsted: Reports
- Menahel: Ephraim Pearlman
- Gender: Male
- Age: 3 to 11
- Website: torahtemimah.wordpress.com

The Avigdor Hirsch Torah Temimah Primary School is a one form entry voluntary aided primary school in the London Borough of Brent. It is a Haredi Jewish single-sex primary school for up to 204 boys aged 3–11. The school includes a nursery.

== History ==
The school was opened in 1989 when a group of parents found that local Jewish schools in north west London were becoming overcrowded, and who in addition wanted a school that aligned to the style of education that they wished for their children - a single-sex boys' school with: orthodox Jewish practice; pre-eminence given to a high standard of Jewish Torah studies; moral, spiritual and personal development of pupils to high standards; and a broad secular education to a high standard (including the UK National Curriculum) compatible with orthodox Jewish values. Its first premises was in Golders Green before moving to Woodside Park Synagogue. Having outgrown the Synagogue premises, in 1996 the school moved to permanent accommodation in what was formerly the Dollis Hill Synagogue, which the school purchased from the United Synagogue in 1995 for £360,000.

Originally called just Torah Temimah Primary School, it was renamed the Avigdor Hirsch Torah Temimah Primary School when the new building was dedicated in memory of Avigdor Hirsch, whose family made a donation to the school. It is still known as Torah Temimah for most practical purposes and as Avigdor Hirsch Torah Temimah in official documents and other sources. "Torah Temimah" means "perfect Torah" in Hebrew, and is taken from Psalm 19:8.

The school became voluntary-aided (VA) in the London Borough of Brent in April 2000.

== Senior leaders ==
Rabbi Ephraim Klyne was appointed as Principal and Head Teacher in 1989 and remained in this post until September 2002 when he was promoted to the position of Menahel (Principal) with responsibility for the religious ethos and direction of the school. In September 2002, Anthony Wolfson was appointed Headteacher, a post he held for eight years. Wolfson left in July 2010 to take up another headship and was succeeded by Rabbi Yitzchak Freeman, previously Head of Kisharon. In August 2021, Freeman retired and was succeeded as Headteacher by Michaeman. In August 2023, Klyne retired and was succeeded as Menahel by Rabbi Ephraim Pearlman.

== Achievements and standards ==
Ofsted graded the school as Good in 2007, 2010, November 2011, September 2016, October 2021, and June 2023. The majority of students achieve above-average levels in SATs.

== Architecture of the building ==
The school occupies the building and site of the former Dollis Hill Synagogue. Owen Williams acted as both architect and engineer for the building, which was consecrated in 1938. Concrete was Williams' material of choice and here he used reinforced concrete, generally only 125mm in thickness, cast in situ behind a cork lining left exposed as the internal wall finish. With this system, he created a series of vertical planes, zig-zagged in plan to enclose the hall, with similarly folded planes for its roof. With a span of 18.3m, the roof is of sufficient transverse pitch for rainwater drainage, so asphalt weatherproofing was not needed. The two-storey parts of the complex are rectilinear in plan with flat roofs.

The blandness of the outside walls is relieved by two types of emblematic window openings: hexagonal windows enclosing the shape of the Star of David; and windows with an inverted arch form that includes a stylistic echo of the form of the traditional Jewish seven-branched candelabrum (the "menorah") from the ancient Temple in Jerusalem. These windows run in horizontal rows around the building. The hexagonal windows are of stained glass and are themed around the months and festivals of the Jewish year and the Twelve Tribes of Israel. Although all the designs are different, these windows have colours and other stylistic elements in common that give coherence and a sense of unity to the collection. The inverted arch form windows are of plain clear glass. Williams later justified the whimsical window forms as being of structural relevance to a girder-like concrete element.

The original community hall stood next to the new synagogue building, and was also subsequently modernised around 1952. It stood until 1996 when it was demolished to make space for the school playground. The building was registered as a Grade II listed building by English Heritage in 1988, fifty years after its construction.

The United Synagogue sold the building to the Trustees of Torah Temimah Primary School in 1996. To create the school, six classrooms were constructed in the ground floor main sanctuary area, plus offices in the entrance foyer. An additional floor was also constructed across the whole of the main sanctuary area apart from a space in front of the original synagogue Ark, which was left as an atrium to keep the original Ark location and surrounding features visible. The Ark itself was removed. This additional floor, which linked the women's galleries down each side, was divided to form two further classrooms, a school hall, and smaller teaching and storage areas. Many of the original building features were maintained, including the main entrance doors, windows and internal oak panelling. The cost was £1 million.
