= Ernest George Frederick Vogtherr =

Ernest George Frederick Vogtherr (1898–1973) was a notable New Zealand bacon curer, businessman and art collector. He was born in Sunderland, England in 1898.
