= Langside Synagogue =

Former synagogue in Glasgow, Scotland

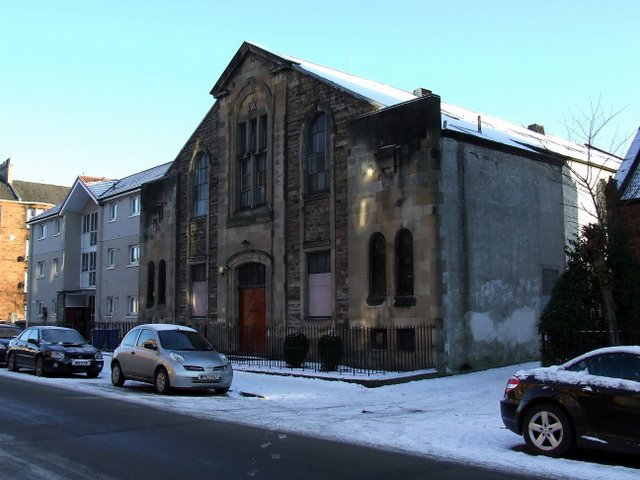
- The synagogue in 2010, prior to its closure

- Location of the former synagogue in Scotland

Religion
- Affiliation: Orthodox Judaism (former)
- Rite: Nusach Ashkenaz
- Ecclesiastical or organisational status: Synagogue (1927–2014)
- Status: Closed; and sold

Location
- Location: 125 Niddrie Road, Govanhill, Glasgow, Scotland G42 8QA
- Country: United Kingdom
- Coordinates: 55°50′07″N 4°16′11″W

Architecture
- Architects: Waddell & Young
- Type: Synagogue architecture
- Style: Eastern European (interior); Romanesque Revival (façade)
- Established: c. 1915 (as a congregation)
- Completed: 1927

Listed Building – Category C(S)
- Designated: 14 September 2020
- Reference no.: LB52561

The Langside Synagogue (Yiddish: לאַנגסייד שול) is a former Orthodox Jewish synagogue, located near Govanhill in Glasgow, Scotland. It opened in May 1927 and closed in 2014. Whilst active, the congregation worshiped in the Ashkenazi rite.

== History ==
The congregation was established in c. 1915 as the Langside Hebrew Congregation and worshiped from premises located at 1 Cromwell Road, Glasgow, until the new synagogue was completed.

Construction of the new synagogue, on Niddrie Road, began in 1926 and the building was opened in May 1927. It was designed by Waddell & Young and its interior was designed by Harris Berkowitch. It was one of the only purpose-built synagogues in Scotland and one of two synagogues of Eastern European style in the United Kingdom. The interior has folk art-style features including woodcarvings and wall-paintings which are similar to synagogues in Romania, Poland, and Ukraine, reflecting the Eastern European heritage of the synagogue's membership. It is also one of a few synagogues in Glasgow to have survived since the interwar period.

It closed in 2014 and was sold in 2019. Some of the interior decoration, including the ark and bimah, were removed after the building closed and went to the Scottish Jewish Archives Centre in Garnethill.

Following an "overwhelming" and "unprecedented" campaign of support, it was made a Category C listed building on 14 September 2020. The features which were considered as significant were the mainly unaltered exterior, the Eastern European design which is rare in the United Kingdom, the fact that it was one of the only purpose-built synagogues in Scotland and the contribution it has to the study of the early 20th-century Jewish community in Glasgow. The single-story addition at the back of the building was not included in the listed designation.

The synagogue building was listed for sale, by auction, in 2021. Following sale of the synagogue, there was a resurgent local Jewish community who expressed interest in re-opening the synagogue for services and as a community centre for Govanhill.

== See also ==
- List of former synagogues in the United Kingdom
- List of Jewish communities in the United Kingdom
- History of the Jews in Scotland
