= Gateshead Jewish Academy for Girls =

- בית חיה רחל

Location
- Gateshead, Tyne and Wear; United Kingdom; 54.954°N 1.607°W grid reference NZ252621

Information
- Other names: Beis Chaya Rochel
- Established: 1998

Gateshead Jewish Academy for Girls, also known as Beis Chaya Rochel (Hebrew: בית חיה רחל), is a two-year post-secondary school college, or "seminary". It was founded in Gateshead, England in 1998; its principal is Rabbi Avrohom Katz, an author and columnist.

It is an Orthodox Jewish college, attracting Haredi students from all around the world, with a dormitory and all long-term in-living accommodations. Most students come from the United Kingdom but significant numbers come from other European countries. Students range in age from 16 to 21.

The academy aims to provide students with an education in the Torah to "guide and support them in their role as orthodox Jewish women in adult life". See Midrasha#Seminaries, for further discussion of this educational approach.

The academy also provides students with opportunities to take a range of AS/A Levels, GCSE and vocational qualifications in partnership with a local FE College.

It is also commonly known by most people as "Gateshead New" (or just "New") due to another seminary that opened earlier in Gateshead and is referred to as "Gateshead Old".
