= Jewish Teachers' Training College =

Coordinates: 54°57′20.34″N 1°36′13.716″W

Location
- Bewick Road; Gateshead; United Kingdom

Information
- Other name: Beth Midrash Lemoroth
- Religious affiliation: Orthodox Judaism
- Founded: 1944; 82 years ago
- Founder: Avraham Dov Kohn
- Principal: Rabbi Simcha Kohn
- Website: gatesheadsem.org

The Jewish Teachers' Training College (also known as Beth Midrash Lemoroth) is an all-girls school on Bewick Road in Gateshead, England.

It is also commonly known by most people as "Gateshead Old" due to another seminary that opened later in Gateshead which is referred to as "Gateshead New".

== History ==
The school was founded by Avraham Dov Kohn in 1944, then headed by Rabbi Mordechai Miller, (1921-2001) and subsequently run by Kohn's son Rabbi Simcha Kohn. Kohn described the vision for the school as coming from Rabbi Eliyahu Eliezer Dessler.

In 1971, the school offered a three‐year program which trained girls to become teachers. Subjects included women in the Talmud, marriage, Israeli geography, and kashrut.

The course, which runs for three years, has been described as largely staffed by experienced rabbis.

In 2019, they began expanding their building behind their Bewick Road facility.
