= Sunderland Talmudical College =

College in Gateshead, England

Coordinates: 54°57′02″N 1°36′04″W

- ישיבת נצח ישראל

Location
- Prince Consort Road; Gateshead, NE8 4DE; United Kingdom

Information
- Religious affiliation: Haredi
- Established: October 1946; 79 years ago
- Founders: Rabbi Aryeh Leib Grossnass; Rabbi Zushe Waltner
- Rosh yeshiva: Rabbi Yankel Ehrentreu
- Age range: 15–22
- Enrollment: 100

The Sunderland Talmudical College (Hebrew: ישיבת שארית הפליטה נצח ישראל), popularly known as Sunderland Yeshiva, is a yeshiva located in Gateshead, United Kingdom. As of 2025, the student body numbers approximately 100. Students are mainly English; however, there are also students from Switzerland, Belgium and the USA.

== History ==
The yeshiva was founded in the city of Sunderland in the United Kingdom in October 1946 by Rabbi Aryeh Leib Grossnass and Rabbi Zushe Waltner at the initiative of Rabbi Eliyahu Eliezer Dessler. It was originally located at 2 Kensington Esplanade. The first students were approximately 30 former yeshiva students from displaced persons camps, who Grossnass traveled to Prague to collect. In the 1950s, the yeshiva accepted several students from Morocco, which was subsequently followed in the coming years by other students from North Africa.

The class of 1954

The beis hamedrash in the 1950s

In November 1952 the yeshiva moved to 1 The Cedars Road, Sunderland. It re-located to Gateshead in June 1988, but kept its original name.

In 2021, following a successful matching campaign, the yeshiva extended its building to include a new dining room, shiur rooms and dormitories. Today the yeshiva has approximately 100 students, including 60 in the yeshiva and 40 in the Kibbutz. 80% of the student body are from out of town, while the rest attend from within the local community.

== Faculty ==
The first rosh yeshiva was Rabbi Zushe Waltner. After Rabbi Aryeh Leib Grossnass decided to return to the Gateshead Kolel, Rabbi Shammai Zahn was chosen to assist in running the yeshiva. On a trip to Tangier, Morocco in 1952 to collect students, Waltner decided to remain and establish a school system there, upon the request of community leader Rabbi Shmuel Toledano. He was replaced by Zahn as rosh yeshiva. From 1965 until 1987, Zahn was joined by Rabbi Zechariah Gelley. Following Zahn's death in 2003, Rabbi Yankel Ehrentreu, the current rosh yeshiva, was appointed. The head of the Kibbutz is his brother Rabbi Avrohom Ehrentreu.

The faculty, many who are part of the extended Ehrentreu-Zahn families, include:

- Rabbi Avrohom Chaim Zahn, morning Maggid Shiur of Shiur Alef (the 1st year)
- Rabbi Shlomo Klyne, afternoon Maggid Shiur of Shiur Alef
- Rabbi Shmuel Wolf, morning Maggid Shiur of Shiur Beis (the 2nd year)
- Rabbi Yankel Rubenstein, afternoon Maggid Shiur of Shiur Beis
- Rabbi Dovid Zahn, morning Maggid Shiur of Shiur Gimmel (the 3rd year)
- Rabbi Chaim Roberts, Rosh Chabura (head of study group) of Shiur Gimmel

The faculty also includes several sho'elim u'meishivim, such as Rabbi Yaki Cohen, Rabbi Chaim Goldkin and Rabbi Yisroel Meir Hirsch.

Rabbi Yaakov Abenson served as mashgiach until his death in September 2024. In the 2010s, upon his semi-retirement, Rabbi Moshe Salomon was appointed mashgiach, and served until his death in July 2025. He was succeeded by Rabbi Yisroel Rosenberg.

== Curriculum ==
The yeshiva's studies are primarily Talmud texts and relevant rabbinic literature. The yeshiva has a rotating cycle of Talmudic tractates it covers in the course of seven years.

The daily schedule consists of three sedarim (study sessions) – a morning session, an afternoon session, and an evening session. For each session there is a different chapter of the tractate which is studied. The morning and afternoon subjects, called iyun, are the more in-depth subjects which the shiurim are given on, while the evening session (bekius) is focussed on building general knowledge of the Talmud.

== The Kibbutz ==
The Kibbutz, a collection of top students from high-calibre yeshivas, is a more recent addition to the yeshiva. The head of the Kibbutz, Rabbi Avrohom Ehrentreu, is a disciple of Rabbi Chatzkel Levenstein, and is head of the Gateshead Va'ad Horabonim with three other rabbis. The mashgiach of the Kibbutz is Rabbi Ephraim Shmuel Zahn.

The students of the Kibbutz have a separate dormitory from the yeshiva, in premises on Avenue Road known as The Lodge. They learn together with the younger students, in a daily session known as rebbe talmid seder.

In September 2023, Rabbi Yechezkal Ehrentreu was promoted to a position on the hanhala of the Kibbutz, having previously served as maggid shiur in the yeshiva.

== Campus ==
The current building, constructed in 1897, previously housed the Education Offices. It is a red brick structure with stone accents and a Welsh slate roof, designed in an elaborate Flemish style. The building has three storeys and five sections, with the outer sections featuring distinctive gables. It is richly decorated with carved details. It features contrasting terracotta detailing with Dutch gables and intricate window surrounds to the front and two main side elevations with stone dressings. The roof, in particular, is of significance and contributes much to the overall architectural composition of the building. The building is also included on the Gateshead Local List.

The extension to the rear of the building, built in 2021, features a contemporary design with robust brickwork and metal standing seam cladding above to give it a modern look, along with large windows facing onto the street.

The building is 1,285 square metres and includes a 140 square metre beis hamedrash, four shiur rooms, a dining room, and dormitories.

== Notable alumni ==
- Rabbi Pesach Eliyahu Falk, posek, lecturer and author
