= List of people associated with Balliol College, Oxford =

The following comprises lists of notable people associated with Balliol College, Oxford, namely alumni and those who taught at the College or were based at the College or were involved in college life. The alumni are grouped into categories corresponding to fields of work and are arranged chronologically. Almost all the individuals have a wiki page. The majority are men because women were only admitted to the college from 1979.

== Alumni ==
=== Lists for specific categories ===
- Academics
- Economists
- Historians and Classicists
- Lawyers
- Media
- Musicians
- Philosophers
- Politicians
- Religious
- Scientists and Mathematicians
- Sports
- Writers

== Balliol Chancellors of Oxford University ==
- Richard FitzRalph (1332)
- William de Wilton (1374)
- Thomas Chace (1426)
- Richard Rotherham (1440)
- William Grey (1440)
- Robert Thwaytes (1445)
- George Neville (1453); (1461)
- John Morton (1494)
- George Nathaniel Curzon (1907)
- Alfred Milner (1925)
- Edward Grey (1928)
- Harold Macmillan (1960)
- Roy Harris Jenkins (1987)
- Christopher Francis Patten (2003)

== College alumni ==
=== Security, Military and Intelligence ===
Image	Name	Join Date	Field of work	Comments	Refs
	Cressida Dick	1979	police	commissioner of the London Metropolitan Police daughter of Balliol Senior Tutor Marcus Dick	
	Lieutenant-General Simon Mayall	1975	army	Defence Senior Advisor Middle East	
	Sir John Rennie	1932	intelligence	Director MI6	
	Group Captain Archie Hope	1930	RAF	DFC; RAF pilot WW2	
	Lt Col J. L. Austin	1929	intelligence	D Day Intelligence Leader	
	Hon Richard Gilbert Hare	1925	propaganda	Head of Russian propaganda, Ministry of Information WW2 Russian art historian	
	Lieutenant Arthur Rhys-Davids	1916	RFC	MC declined scholarship to join the RFC	
	Captain John Aidan Liddell	1908	RFC	VC MC	
	Lieutenant-General Adrian Carton de Wiart	1899	army	VC left before graduating to fight in Boer War	
	Vice-Admiral William Monson	1581	navy	Matriculated at 14. His Naval Tracts describe Navy life	

== Sources of information ==
The main source of information confirming college membership is the relevant edition of The Balliol College Register which lists Fellows and students by year of matriculation, thus providing evidence of existence, dates and some biographical information.

- 1st edition — 1832–1914
- 2nd edition — 1833–1933
- 3rd edition — 1900–1950
- 4th edition — 1916–1967
- 5th edition — 1950–1980
- 6th edition — 1940–1990
- 7th edition — 1950–2000

Other sources of information include the Oxford Dictionary of National Biography and Who's Who and Who was Who both published by Oxford University Press.

== Fictional alumni ==
- Sir Humphrey Appleby (from TV series Yes Minister)
- Sir Arnold Robinson (from TV series Yes Minister)
- The Rev Francis Arabin (from Barchester Towers by Anthony Trollope)
- John Blaylock (from Whitley Streiber's The Hunger)
- Captain Hook from Peter Pan by J. M. Barrie
- Captain John Charity Spring (from Flash for Freedom! by George MacDonald Fraser)
- Lord Peter Wimsey (from novels and short stories by Dorothy L. Sayers)

== Notable applicants who did not matriculate ==
- Isaiah Berlin – British philosopher (1909–1997)
- Tony Blair – Prime Minister of the United Kingdom from 1997 to 2007
- Bill Clinton – President of the United States from 1993 to 2001
- Daniel Dennett – American philosopher (1942–2024)
- A. Hyatt Mayor – American art historian and curator (1901–1980)
- Avrion Mitchison – British zoologist and immunologist (1928–2022)
- Colin McGinn – British philosopher (born 1950)
- John Simon – British politician and Lord Chancellor (1873–1954) - served variously as Home Secretary, Foreign Secretary and Chancellor of the Exchequer (1873-1954)
- Lytton Strachey – English writer and critic (1880–1932)
