= List of science, technology and mathematics people associated with Balliol College, Oxford =

This is a list of notable people associated with Balliol College, Oxford, who worked in the fields of science, medicine, technology and mathematics.

== Medicine ==
Image	Name	Join Date	Field of work	Comments	Refs
	Alex Jadad	1992	neuroscience	FRS Jadad scale to assess quality of a clinical trial	
	Atul Gawande	1987	surgery	Rhodes Scholar The Checklist Manifesto for safer surgery	
	Stephen Grosz	1975	psychoanalysis	matriculated Stephen Gross The Examined Life; How We Lose and Find Ourselves	
	Stephen Bergman	1966	psychiatry	Rhodes Scholar The House of God under pen name Samuel Shem	
	George Beadle	1958	genetics	Eastman Professor, Fellow Nobel Prize in Physiology or Medicine for the discovery that genes act by regulating definite chemical events 1958	
	Sir George Alberti	1956	diabetes	FRCP The Alberti Regime for controlling blood sugar levels	
	Baruch Blumberg	1955	communicable diseases	Master of Balliol Nobel Prize in Physiology or Medicine for the discoveries concerning new mechanisms for the origin and dissemination of infectious diseases (Hep B virus) 1976	
	Raymond Michael Gaze	1949	neuroscience	FRS, FRSE deputy director of The National Institute for Medical Research	
	Ludwig Guttmann	1939	neurology	refugee founder of the Paralympic Games	

== Biology including mathematical biology ==
Image	Name	Join Date	Field of work	Comments	Refs
	Beth Shapiro	1999	molecular biology	Rhodes scholar, MacArthur Fellow chief science officer of Colossal Biosciences How to Clone a Mammoth	
	Ewan Birney	1992	genomics	FRS	
	Sir Peter Donnelly	1980	biostatistics	Rhodes Scholar FRS CEO Genomics PLC	
	Philip Maini	1979	mathematical biology	FRS	
	Julian Peto	1964	epidemiology	FRS	
	Denis Noble	1963	systems biology	FRS, Fellow	
	Richard Dawkins	1959	evolutionary biology	FRS; Professor for the Public Understanding of Science, Oxford The Selfish Gene new atheist	
	Robert Hinde	1948	zoology	FRS ethologist and psychologist	
	P. A. P. Moran	1947	population genetics	FRS "Arithmetic I could not do"	
	Sir Julian Huxley	1906	evolutionary biology	FRS first director of UNESCO	
	Reginald Farrer	1898	plant collecting	My Rock Garden	
	Thomas Andrew Knight	1778	horticulture	FRS	
	Henry Hawkins Tremayne	1759	arboriculture	Created the Lost Gardens of Heligan	

== Chemistry ==
Image	Name	Join Date	Field of work	Comments	Refs
	Dame Clare Grey	1990	electric battery	FRS Professor, Cambridge University	
	Hagan Bayley	1970	chemical biology	FRS Oxford Professor founder Oxford Nanopore 2005	
	Malcolm Green	1963	inorganic chemistry	FRS, FRSC Oxford Professor co-founder of the Oxford Catalysts Group plc 2006	
	Jeremy Knowles	1955	enzyme catalysis	FRS, FAAAS dean, Arts and Sciences, Harvard	
	Daniel Adzei Bekoe	1954	X-ray crystallography	FGA Vice-Chancellor, University of Ghana	
	Linus Pauling	1947	valency	Fellow Nobel Prize for Chemistry: nature of the chemical bond 1954 Nobel Peace Prize: for his fight against the nuclear arms race between East and West 1962	
	Oliver Smithies	1943	genetics	Nobel Prize for Physiology or Medicine: homologous recombination 2007	
	Christopher Longuet-Higgins	1941	molecular science	FRS, FRSE "unfortunate not to receive the Nobel prize for his work"	
	Bill Smythies	1931	natural history	"Birds of Burma" uncle of Richard Dawkins	
	Alexander George Ogston	1929	biochemistry	FRS, Fellow Three-point attachment theory	
	Ronnie Bell	1924	physical chemistry	FRS, FRSE Fellow Professor of chemistry, Stirling The proton in chemistry 1959	
	Sir Cyril Norman Hinshelwood	1919	chemical kinetics	OM, FRS Nobel Prize mechanism of chemical reactions 1956	
	E. J. Bowen	1915	photochemistry	FRS Rescued the blackboard used by Albert Einstein	
	Sir Benjamin Brodie	1834	peroxides	FRS for analysis of beeswax	

== Mathematics ==
Image	Name	Join Date	Field of work	Comments	Refs
Mathematician	Vicky Neale	2014	Mathematical research and exposition	2017 book Closing the Gap: The Quest to Understand Prime Numbers	
	James Maynard	2009	Number theorist	Fields Medal winner	
	Nick Trefethen	1997	Numerical analysis	FRS	
	Sarah B. Hart	1993	Mathematical exposition	Once Upon a Prime: The Wondrous Connections Between Mathematics and Literature	
	Dame Frances Kirwan	1981	algebraic geometry	FRS Savilian Professor of Geometry	
	Philip Candelas	1975	Mathematical physics	FRS, Rouse Ball Professor at Oxford	
	Anand Pillay	1970	model theory	Chair of Mathematical Logic, University of Leeds	
	Aubrey William Ingleton	1967	Matroids	Fellow	
	Robin Wilson	1962	graph theory	Professor, Open University public mathematician	
	Leslie Colin Woods	1961	Thermodynamics	Rhodes Scholar, Fellow	
	Gilbert Strang	1955	Linear algebra	Rhodes Scholar	
	Donald Michie	1945	artificial intelligence	cryptography at Bletchley Park	
	Sir Wilfred Cockcroft	1940	mathematics educator	Mathematics Counts (1983), the "Cockcroft Report" on teaching mathematics.	
	Graham Higman	1934	Group theory	FRS Fellow	
	Holbrook Mann MacNeille	1928	order theory	Rhodes Scholar director, American Mathematical Society	
	Arthur Geoffrey Walker	1928	cosmology	FRS, FRSE	
	J. H. C. Whitehead	1923	Algebraic topology	FRS Operational Research in WW2	
	Sir Alexander Oppenheim	1921	Quadratic forms	FRSE, Oppenheim conjecture	
	E. C. Titchmarsh	1917	number theory	FRS Savilian Professor of Geometry	
	Theodore William Chaundy	1906	differential algebra	Differential Calculus	
	Julian Coolidge	1895	geometry	Chairman, Harvard Mathematics Department A Treatise on the Circle and the Sphere	
	Charles Howard Hinton	1874	four-dimensional space	Coined the term "tesseract"	
	Henry John Stephen Smith	1844	matrix theory Smith normal form	FRS, FRSE Fellow Savilian Professor of Geometry	
	William Spottiswoode	1842	determinants	FRS, FRSE Simultaneously President of Royal Society and the British Association	
	James Stirling	1711	Stirling's approximation for factorials	A Snell and Warner exhibitioner, he was expelled in 1715 for his correspondence with Jacobites Later on, he feared assassination for having discovered the glassmakers' secret	
	Noah Bridges	1613	cryptography	courtier to King Charles II	
	Cuthbert Tunstall	1491	business mathematics	Catholic bishop Published the first book of mathematics printed in England	

== Physics and astronomy ==
Image	Name	Join date	Field of work	Comments	Refs
	Patrick Hayden	1998	quantum information theory	Rhodes Scholar Professor of Physics, Stanford	
	Sir Anthony James Leggett	1955	superconductivity	FRS Honorary Fellow Nobel Prize "for pioneering contributions to the theory of superconductors and superfluids" 2003	
	Heinrich Gerhard Kuhn	1950	atomic spectra	FRS first fellow in physics worked on the Manhattan Project	
	R. V. Jones	1934	scientific intelligence	FRS "the father of scientific intelligence" Most Secret War: British Scientific Intelligence 1939–1945 1978	
	Herbert Squire	1927	fluid dynamics	FRS Zaharoff Professor of Aviation at Imperial College	
	James Bradley	1711	astronomy	Bradley (FRS) discovered the aberration of light and the nutation of the earth's axis. He was placed (after Hipparchus and Kepler) "above the greatest astronomers of all ages and all countries" by Delambre and was appointed Savilian Professor of Astronomy, eventually becoming the third Astronomer Royal in 1742	
	John Keill	1692	Newtonian Physics	Keill (FRS) followed his preceptor Gregory from Edinburgh to the Savilian chair of Astronomy After conducting experiments in his room at Balliol on Newton's findings, he was the first person to teach the new physics at Hart Hall	
	David Gregory	1691	Newtonian theory	Gregory (FRS) was the first to openly teach the doctrines of the Principia in a public seminary and was elected as the Savilian Professor of Astronomy, due in part to the influence of Isaac Newton He also argued that mathematics should be taught in English rather than Latin	
