= Daiches =

Daiches is a Scottish surname, originating in Eastern Europe. Notable people with the surname include:

- David Daiches (1912–2005), Scottish literary historian and literary critic
- Jenni Calder (née Daiches) (born 1941), Scottish literary historian, daughter of David Daiches
- Lionel Daiches (1911–1999), Scottish politician, brother of David Daiches,
- Salis Daiches (1880–1945), Lithuanian-Scottish rabbi, father of David and Lionel Daiches
