= List of clergy and theologians associated with Balliol College, Oxford =

This is a list of clergy and theologians associated with Balliol College, Oxford.

| Image | Name | Join date | Position | Comments | Refs |
|---|---|---|---|---|---|
| | Karma Phuntsho | 1997 | Buddhist Monk | Bhutanese scholar | |
| | Judith M. Brown | 1990 | Anglican Priest; St Mary Magdalen, Oxford | Beit Professor of Commonwealth History; Fellow The first woman chaplain at Oxford (Brasenose) 2017 | |
| | Alan Wilson | 1978 | Bishop of Buckingham | Doctoral thesis: "The authority of church and party among London Anglo-Catholics, 1880–1914" Called for removal of restrictions for on clergy entering into same-sex civil marriages | |
| | Michael Sadgrove | 1968 | post-evangelical catholic Anglican priest theologian | Dean of Durham, Dean of Sheffield 2016 launched "Christians for Europe" advocating the UK's continued membership of the EU | |
| | Bill Sykes | 1960 | Anglican priest | Chaplain, University College, London and University College, Oxford Visions of Faith: An Anthology of Reflections | |
| | Ian Ker | 1960 | Catholic priest, convert from Anglican theologian | authority on John Henry Newman; Theology lecturer, Oxford; Mere Catholicism; Biography of GK Chesterton | |
| | Thomas Stonor | 1959 | Lord Chamberlain | first Catholic Lord Chamberlain (head of Royal Household) since the Reformation | |
| | Crispian Hollis | 1956 | Catholic Bishop of Portsmouth | Catholic Chaplain to Oxford University | |
| | Dick France | 1956 | New Testament scholar and Anglican cleric | Principal of Wycliffe Hall | |
| | David Young | 1951 | Bishop of Ripon | supporter of women priests, but opposed to active homosexual priests and same-sex marriages | |
| | Lionel Blue | 1950 | Rabbi (first to come out publicly); BBC Radio 4 broadcaster - "Thought for the Day" | Occasional guest speaker of the Jewish Gay and Lesbian Group and a patron of Centred (formerly Kairos). Autobiography Hitchhiking to Heaven 2004 | |
| | Ambrose Griffiths | 1946 | Bishop of Hexham and Newcastle | Abbot of Ampleforth Abbey | |
| | Ronald Gordon | 1945 | Bishop of Portsmouth, Bishop of Lambeth | , Bishop to the Forces Member, Advisory Board for Redundant Churches | |
| | Graham Leonard | 1939 | Bishop of London | Captain in WW2 Converted to Catholicism after he retired and received the title of Monsignor | |
| | Mirza Nasir Ahmad | 1934 | Third Caliph of the Ahmadiyya Muslim Community from Pakistan | Adopted the motto "Love for all, Hatred for None" | |
| | Cecil Jackson-Cole | 1928 | entrepreneur and humanitarian | Co-founded Oxfam, Help the Aged and ActionAid | |
| | Austin Farrer | 1923 | Anglo-Catholic theologian | Warden of Keble College The Farrer hypothesis that the Gospel of Mark was written first, followed by the Gospel of Matthew and then by the Gospel of Luke, with Matthew and Luke using the earlier gospel(s) as sources | |
| | Shogi Effendi Rabbani | 1920 | Guardian of the Baháʼí Faith | He expanded the number of people following the faith. | |
| | F. L. Cross | 1917 | patristics scholar and Anglican priest Canon of Christ Church | Lady Margaret Professor of Divinity reengaged with Christians in Germany after WW2 | |
| | Israel Brodie | 1916 | Chief Rabbi | His ministry coincided with the creation of the State of Israel after WW2 and was focused on rebuilding European Jewry | |
| | Thomas Layng | 1911 | Archdeacon of York | Deputy Chaplain-General to the Forces Chaplain to King George VI and Queen Elizabeth II | |
| | Arnold Lunn | 1907 | Catholic convert from Methodism; Catholic apologist | Inventor of the slalom ski run | |
| | Ronald Knox | 1906 | Catholic priest, convert from Anglican | Crime writer and translator of the Knox Bible, which was called "an exceptional achievement both of scholarship and of literary dedication" by Archbishop of Canterbury, Rowan Williams Catholic Chaplain to the University of Oxford | |
| | William Heard | 1903 | Catholic convert 1910; Cardinal | First Scottish cardinal since the Reformation; Closely attended Pope Paul VI | |
| | William Temple | 1900 | Archbishop of Canterbury | "His influence on the British people, in the field of social justice, on the Christian Church as a whole, and in international relations, was of a kind to which it would be very difficult to find a parallel in the history of England" Bishop George Bell | |
| | Stacy Waddy | 1893 | Canon,St. George's Cathedral, Jerusalem | Headmaster, The King's School, Parramatta, Australia first class cricketer | |
| | Thomas Byles | 1889 | Blessed; Catholic priest | A number of witnesses attest to his serenity and calmness amid the chaos – hearing confessions, giving blessings and doing what he could to comfort the terrified women and children into the lifeboats and it is said twice refused a place in the lifeboat. He was last seen gathering a group of men around him and leading them in the Rosary. | |
| | Cosmo Lang | 1882 | Archbishop of York, then Archbishop of Canterbury | Criticised Edward VIII for abdicating | |
| | Henry Beeching | 1878 | Dean of Norwich | professor of Pastoral Theology KCL; Chaplain of Lincoln's Inn; Canon of Westminster Abbey | |
| | Charles Gore | 1871 | Bishop of Worcester, Birmingham, then Oxford | Chaplain to Queen Victoria and King Edward VII | |
| | Hardwicke Rawnsley | 1870 | Anglican priest | Chaplain to the King Co-founder National Trust | |
| | Henry Scott Holland | 1865 | Canon of Christ Church | Regius Professor of Divinity keen interest in social justice | |
| | Joseph Wood | 1861 | Prebendary of St Paul's Cathedral | Headmaster successively of Leamington College, Tonbridge School, and Harrow School | |
| | Henry Oxenham | 1846 | Catholic convert from Anglican Ecclesiologist | Sought a better understanding between the Roman and Anglican churches | |
| | George Ridding | 1846 | Bishop of Southwell | Headmaster, Winchester College | |
| | John Coleridge Patteson | 1844 | Missionary to the South Sea Islands; Bishop of Anglican Church of Melanesia | Killed by natives after being mistaken for a slave trader | |
| | Godfrey Thring | 1841 | Anglican priest | Co-writer of the hymn Crown Him with Many Crowns | |
| | Frederick Temple | 1838 | Fellow Archbishop of Canterbury | "The doctrine of Evolution is in no sense whatever antagonistic to the teachings of Religion." | |
| | Benjamin Jowett | 1835 | Anglican cleric Moral teacher | Master of Balliol; Regius Professor of Greek; Confidant of Florence Nightingale | |
| | Dean Stanley | 1834 | Anglican priest Broad churchman Liberal theologian | Regius Professor of Ecclesiastical History Dean of Westminster Buried in Westminster Abbey | |
| | Samuel Waldegrave | 1834 | Bishop of Carlisle | previously canon of Salisbury Cathedral | |
| | Meyrick Goulburn | 1834 | Dean of Norwich | Headmaster, Rugby School traditional conservative | |
| | Frederick William Faber | 1832 | Oratorian; Catholic convert from Anglican | Hymn writer Faith of our Fathers Founded Brompton Oratory Granduncle of founder of publishing house Faber and Faber | |
| | Archibald Campbell Tait | 1829 | Archbishop of Canterbury (first from Scotland) | Fellow; Headmaster, Rugby School; Bishop of London Introduced the Public Worship Regulation Act 1874 to limit the growing ritualism of Anglo-Catholicism | |
| | Henry Manning | 1827 | Catholic convert from Anglican; Cardinal-Archbishop of Westminster | Influenced the papal encyclical Rerum novarum promoting the Catholic view of social justice Wrote The Eternal Priesthood anti-vivisectionist His remains are in Westminster Cathedral | |
| | George Moberly | 1822 | Bishop of Salisbury | Headmaster, Winchester School | |
| | George Greig | 1813 | Chaplain-General of the Forces | Wrote biography of the Duke of Wellington 1890 | |
| | Arthur Broome | 1798 | Clergyman, Bromley by Bow | Founded the Royal Society for the Prevention of Cruelty to Animals (RSPCA) in 1824 | |
| | Archibald Alison | 1775 | Scottish Anglican priest and essayist | His preaching attracted so many hearers that a new and larger church was built for him - St Paul's Chapel on York Place in Edinburgh 1818 | |
| | John Jacques | 1744 | Vicar, Great Packington | Prebendary of Lincoln Cathedral | |
| | John Douglas | 1738 | Bishop of Salisbury | attacked David Hume's rationalism in his "Letter on the Criterion of Miracles" | |
| | George Abbot | 1579 | Archbishop of Canterbury | Vice-Chancellor, Oxford; Chancellor, University of Dublin a translator of the King James Version of the Bible performed the coronation ceremony of King Charles I as king of England. | |
| | Alexander Briant | 1574 | Saint and martyr | Tortured, convicted of High Treason in a show trial, clumsily hanged, drawn and quartered at Tyburn | |
| | Robert Persons | 1568 | Jesuit; Led the English Mission. | Rector, English College, Rome | |
| | Anthony Garnet | c1550 | Anglican Priest ordained 1556 | Fellow; Rector, Lowther; Vicar,Burgh by Sands, Cumbria 1574–1582 (death) | |
| | John Bell | (1498) | Bishop of Worcester | Supported King Henry VIII in the King's Great Matter | |
| | George Neville | 1448 | Archbishop of York; Lord Chancellor | Chancellor of the University of Oxford took part in the proclamation of Edward IV as king, who confirmed his appointment as chancellor benefactor of the university of Oxford and of Balliol College | |
| | John Morton | 1440 | Cardinal and Archbishop of Canterbury | a man of great learning and profound wisdom, devoted to the service of God, concerned for the public welfare rather than for his own advantage, immersing himself profitably in both religious and secular affairs, and not shrinking from the heat and burden of the day | |
| | John Wycliffe | 1350 | Dissident Catholic priest | Master Known as "Doctor Evangelicus" Involved in translating Bible into English | |
| | Thomas Bradwardine | (1318) | Archbishop of Canterbury | Known as "Doctor Profundus" Despite never rejecting the papacy, Thomas Bradwardine is cited as holding Reformation theology before Luther and Calvin Chaucer ranks Bradwardine with Augustine and Boethius in The Nun's Priest's Tale | |
| | John de Stratford | (1293) | Archbishop of Canterbury | Bishop of Winchester, Treasurer and Chancellor of England | |
