= The Examined Life (disambiguation) =

The Examined Life is a 1989 collection of philosophical meditations by Robert Nozick.

The Examined Life may also refer to:

- The Examined Life, a 2010 book by Theodore Dalrymple
- The Examined Life (Stephen Grosz book), a 2013 collection of essays by the psychoanalyst Stephen Grosz
- Examined Life, a 2008 film by Astra Taylor

== See also ==
- "The unexamined life is not worth living", a dictum apparently uttered by Socrates, as described in Plato's Apology
