= List of writers associated with Balliol College, Oxford =

This is a list of writers associated with Balliol College, Oxford.

== Authors ==
=== Novelists, playwrights and screenwriters ===
Image	Name	Join Date	Theme	Comments	Refs
	William Hurrell Mallock	1869	novel	Catholic writer who opposed socialism The New Republic	
	Sir Anthony Hope Hawkins	1881	adventure fiction	The Prisoner of Zenda	
	Aldous Huxley	1913	dystopian fiction	author of Brave New World and The Doors of Perception, widely acknowledged as one of the foremost intellectuals of his time, nominated for the Nobel Prize in Literature nine times, and elected Companion of Literature by the Royal Society of Literature in 1962	
	L. P. Hartley	1915	family relationships	wrote of morality, society and the loss of innocence The Go-Between was made into a film.	
	Beverley Nichols	1916	emotions	"Down the Garden Path"	
	Nevil Shute	1918	dignity of work	His novels A Town Like Alice, Trustee from the Toolroom and On the Beach featured on the 1998 list of the Modern Library 100 Best Novels of the 20th century	
	Thomas Owen Beachcroft	1921	publicist, poet and writer	Chief Overseas Publicity Officer for the BBC A Young Man in a Hurry and Other Stories 1934; You Must Break Out Sometimes and Other Stories 1936 The English Short Story 1964	
	Graham Greene	1922	thriller	One of the leading novelists of the 20th century, shortlisted for the Nobel Prize in Literature several times. Best known for his 'Catholic novels' exploring moral and political conflicts, especially the contest between the socialist state and private morality. Awarded OM. The Power and the Glory	
	Anthony Powell	1923	book series	His famous series A Dance to the Music of Time (ranked 36th on the BBC list of 100 greatest British novels) earned him the title 'The English Proust'.	
	Robertson Davies	1935	trilogy	One of Canada's best-known and most popular authors and one of its most distinguished "men of letters". His prize-winning novels and trilogies explore Jungian psychology, magic and classical myth. The Deptford Trilogy	
	Dan Davin	1936	New Zealand	Rhodes Scholar, Fellow "Cliffs of Fall"	
	W. J. Burley	1950	detective story	Wycliffe	
	Kyril Bonfiglioli	1955	comedy thriller	Mortdecai	
	Robert Barnard	1956	crime fiction	"Death of an Old Goat"	
	Ian Watson	1960	science fiction	Warhammer 40,000 trilogy	
	Martin Fido	1963	true crime	Fellow Taught English at University of the West Indies and Boston University	
	Martin Edwards	1974	crime novelist	Winner of the Diamond Dagger; Lake District Mysteries "a crime writer's crime writer" winning Captain Christmas University Challenge	
	Mick Herron	1981	espionage	Winner of the Gold Dagger; Slough House novel series Slow Horses TV series	
	Charlotte Jones	1986	playwright	The Halcyon; WW2 period drama TV series	
	Amit Chaudhuri	1987	creative writing	"A Strange and sublime address"	
	Zia Haider Rahman	1987	trust	In the Light of What We Know	
	Rana Dasgupta	1990	globalisation	Tokyo Cancelled	

=== Biographers including auto-biographers ===
Image	Name	Join date	Theme	Comments	Refs
	John Evelyn	1637	diarist	FRS did not graduate	
	John Gibson Lockhart	1809	novelist biographer	wrote standard biography of Sir Walter Scott, his father-in-law	
	John Addington Symonds	1857	biographer	wrote on Percy Bysshe Shelley, Michelangelo et al.	
	Sir Sidney Lee	1878	man of letters	editor, Dictionary of National Biography	
	John Stewart Collis	1918	biographer	biography of George Bernard Shaw The Worm Forgives the Plough about working the land in WWII	
	Peter Quennell (left)	1923	historical writer	"the last genuine example of the English man of letters"	
	Francis King	1941	novelist	Yesterday Came Suddenly, 1993 autobiography	
	Nicholas Mosley	1946	novelist	peer, wrote critical biography of his father, the fascist Sir Oswald Mosley	
	Warren Rovetch	1949	travel writer	Fulbright Scholar The Creaky Traveler	
	Ved Mehta	1956	author	Fellow, blind autobiographer in several books	
	Howard Marks	1964	cannabis dealer	Served 7 years of a 25 year prison sentence in Terre Haute, Indiana after which he wrote the bestseller Mr Nice and became an activist for the legalisation of cannabis	
	Johnny Acton	1984	ghostwriter	Farmer cookery writer	
	Carmen Bugan	2000	poet, scholar, teacher, memoirist	Romanian-American; Burying the Typewriter: Childhood Under the Eye of the Secret Police	

== Literary scholars ==
Image	Name	Join date	Field of work	Comments	Refs
	Herbert Coleridge	1847	philologist	editor Oxford English Dictionary	
	John Nichol	1855	literary critic	Regius Professor of English Literature, Glasgow Byron, Burns, Carlyle	
	John Churton Collins	1867	literary critic	Professor, Birmingham The Study of English Literature "a louse in the locks of literature" (Tennyson)	
	Henry Sweet	1869	phoneticist	A Handbook of Phonetics	
	Henry Watson Fowler	1880	lexicographer	A Dictionary of Modern English Usage Concise Oxford English Dictionary "a lexicographical genius" (The Times)	
	Logan Pearsall Smith second right	1887	essayist	Words and Idioms "The denunciation of the young is a necessary part of the hygiene of older people, and greatly assists in the circulation of their blood."	
	Cyril Connolly	1922	literary critic	Enemies of Promise	
	John Livingston Lowes	1930	Samuel Taylor Coleridge Geoffrey Chaucer	first Eastman Professor taught at Washington University in St. Louis, and Harvard University	
	David Daiches	1934	literary history	Fellow A Critical History of English Literature; The Penguin Companion to Literature	
	George Steiner	1950	comparative literature	Rhodes Scholar, Hon. Fellow Professor at Geneva, Oxford, Harvard Polyglot and polymath	
	John Minford	1964	sinologist	Translator of The Story of the Stone, The Art of War, the I Ching and the Tao Te Ching	

=== Poets ===
Image	Name	Join date	Known as	Known for	Refs
	Sir Edward Dyer	(1561)	Courtier and Poet Chancellor of the Order of the Garter MP for Somerset 1589-	a candidate in the Shakespearean authorship question (Alden Brooks 1943)	
	Robert Southey	1792 DNG	Romantic Poet Poet Laureate	Goldilocks and the Three Bears After Blenheim But what good came of it at last? Quoth little Peterkin. Why that I cannot tell," said he, But 'twas a famous victory.	
	Arthur Hugh Clough	1836	secretarial assistant to Florence Nightingale	his sister and daughter both became principals of Newnham College, Cambridge The Bothie of Toper-na-fuosich	
	John Campbell Shairp	1839	pastoral poet Professor of Humanity, St Andrews Oxford Professor of Poetry	"The Poetic Interpretation of Nature" 1877	
	Matthew Arnold	1840	cultural critic sage writer Oxford Professor of Poetry school inspector	The Scholar Gipsy Dover Beach	
	Francis Turner Palgrave	1842	anthologist Oxford Professor or Poetry	Golden Treasury	
	Charles Stuart Calverley (born Blayds)	1849 (expelled 1850)	Fellow, Christ's Cambridge humourist	"Ode to Tobacco" (1862) is on a bronze plaque in Cambridge market square	
	Algernon Charles Swinburne	1855 (rusticated 1859)	poet-novelist-critic masochist	nominated for the Nobel Prize in Literature every year from 1903 to 1909 Poems and Ballads	
	Gerard Manley Hopkins	1863	Jesuit priest professor of Classics UCD 1884 sprung rhythm	though publishing little while alive, has experienced posthumous fame that placed him among leading English poets with his prosody establishing him as an innovator, as did his praise of God through vivid use of imagery and nature; by 1930 Hopkins's work was seen as one of the most original literary advances of his century The Wreck of the Deutschland "the most original poet of the Victorian age" (Ricks 1991)	
	Andrew Lang	1864	FBA, polymath poet, novelist, literary critic, anthropologist, folklorist	Myth, Ritual and Religion (1887) Lang's Fairy Books 1889 -	
	Robert Browning	1867	Poet and playwright	"the most considerable poet in English since the major Romantics" (Harold Bloom 2004), was a personal friend of the Master Benjamin Jowett and became the college's first Honorary Fellow, donating his portrait and other memorabilia to the college, which grew to become "one of the most distinguished collections of Browning material"	
	Andrew Cecil Bradley	1869	Shakespeare scholar Oxford Professor of Poetry	"Shakespearean Tragedy" 1904, probably the most influential single work of Shakespearean criticism ever published I dreamt last night that Shakespeare’s Ghost; Sat for a civil service post. The English paper for that year Had several questions on King Lear; Which Shakespeare answered very badly Because he hadn’t read his Bradley.	
	William Money Hardinge	1872	The 'Balliol Bugger'	gay literature "Clifford Gray: A Romance of Modern Life" 1881	
	Henry Charles Beeching	1878	Professor of Pastoral Theology KCL 1900-03 Dean of Norwich	"A paradise of English Poetry" 1893 "The Masque of B-ll—l" 1880 First come I; my name is Jowett. There's no knowledge but I know it. I am master of this college: What I don't know isn't knowledge.	
	Count Eric Stenbock	1879 DNG	Baltic Swedish poet writing in English	Macabre fiction and poetry "The Song of the Unwept Tear" covered by Marc Almond in Feasting with Panthers Studies of death : romantic tales 1894	
	Hilaire Belloc	1892	Liberal MP for Salford South 1906-10 Catholic literary revival	"Cautionary Tales for Children" The nicest child I ever knew Was Charles Augustus Fortescue. He never lost his cap, or tore His stockings or his pinafore: Balliol made me, Balliol fed me, Whatever I had she gave me again; And the best of Balliol loved and led me, God be with you, Balliol men	
	Walter Lyon	1905	WW1 war poet	"Easter at Ypres" "I Tracked a Dead Man Down a Trench"	
	Julian Grenfell	1906	WW1 war poet Biography 1976 by Nicholas Mosley (Balliol 1946)	DSO "Into Battle" 1915 The thundering line of battle stands, And in the air Death moans and sings; But Day shall clasp him with strong hands, And Night shall fold him in soft wings.	
	Patrick Shaw-Stewart	1906	WW1 war poet	"Achilles in the Trench" I saw a man this morning Who did not wish to die; I ask, and cannot answer, if otherwise wish I.	
	Joseph Macleod	1926	British poet, actor, playwright theatre director, theatre historian and BBC newsreader	One of the earliest interpreters of Chekhov in the UK, whom Basil Bunting claimed was the most important living British poet, while also gaining admiration from Ezra Pound Riddle-me-ree 1971 "I was afraid and they gave me guts. I was alone and they made me love. Round that wild heat they built a furnace and in the torment smelted me. Out of my fragments came design: I was assembled. I moved, I worked, I grew receptive. Thanks to them I have fashioned me. Who am I?"	
	Sir Laurence Whistler	1930	poet and glass engraver	President of the British Guild of Glass Engravers King's Gold Medal for Poetry	
	F. T. Prince	1931	WW2 poet	One of the best-known poems of the Second World War "Soldiers Bathing"	
	Sir Christopher Ricks	1953	FBA literary critic Professor of the Humanities at Boston University. Formerly Professor at Cambridge	practical criticism "exactly the kind of critic every poet dreams of finding" W H Auden	
	Gwyneth Lewis	1985	National Poet of Wales Artist in Residence, Balliol College	Honorary Fellow, Harkness Fellow wrote the bilingual six-foot-high words on the front of the Wales Millennium Centre	
