= Jewish Council of Scotland =

Democratic representative body of all the Jewish communities of Scotland

- Formation: 1999; 27 years ago
- Type: Scottish charitable incorporated organisation
- Registration no.: SC029438
- Headquarters: Glasgow
- Region served: Scotland
- Website: jewishscotland.org

The Jewish Council of Scotland (JCoS), formerly the Scottish Council of Jewish Communities (SCoJeC), is the democratic representative body of all the Jewish communities of Scotland. The council was founded in 1999 in response to Scottish devolution, with the principal aim of providing the Jewish community of Scotland with a single voice in dealings with the Scottish Parliament and Government, other communities, and other statutory and official bodies.

The Council advances public understanding about the Jewish religion, culture and community, by providing information and assistance to educational, health, and welfare organisations. It also provides a support network for the smaller communities and individuals and families who live outside any Jewish community, and assists organisations within the Scottish Jewish community to comply with various regulatory requirements.

The council also promotes dialogue between the Jewish community and other communities in Scotland, and works in partnership with other organisations and stakeholders to encourage understanding among community groups.

== History ==
The council was formed in 1999, principally by the Glasgow Jewish Representative Council and the Edinburgh Hebrew Congregation, after Scottish devolution to give the Jewish community of Scotland a single voice in dealings with the Scottish Parliament and Government and other official bodies.

The council is affiliated to the Board of Deputies of British Jews, which speaks for the entire UK Jewish community on reserved matters that affect the entire UK, while the council has the same role in relation to the Scottish Government and other Scottish bodies with regard to matters devolved by the Scotland Act that only affect Scotland. Thus the council is autonomous with regard to matters such as justice, education, health and welfare, and community relations, whilst the Board of Deputies speaks for all Britain's Jews on reserved matters such as foreign affairs and international development.

== Governance ==
The council was initially established as the Scottish Council of Jewish Communities when a meeting of all Scotland's organised Jewish communities adopted its first constitution on 30 September 1999, and was recognised as Scottish Charity no. SC029438 by the Inland Revenue on 15 October 1999. It was incorporated as a Scottish Charitable Incorporated Organisation on 1 December 2011. Its constitution was revised again effective 19 February 2025, when it was renamed the Jewish Council of Scotland.

The members of JCoS' Council are the elected representatives of each of the formally organised Jewish communities in Scotland.

In addition to the elected representatives, the council also includes further individuals from these communities who have been coopted on account of their particular expertise or experience; these have included a former judge and professor of law, a professor of social policy, a former senior civil servant, a consultant physician, and a senior social worker. The Council meets several times a year.

This representative democratic constitution enables JCoS to speak in the name of the whole Jewish Community of Scotland to government, parliament, churches, trades unions, the media, etc., about matters of concern to Jewish people in Scotland. For example, JCoS regularly responds to official consultations issued by the Scottish Government, Parliamentary Committees, and other bodies, in order to enable the views of the Scottish Jewish community to be taken into account when policy is being developed on matters that affect the community. These include antisemitism and hate crime, equalities and human rights, family law, death registration, the census, shechitah, medico-legal matters, protection of children and vulnerable adults, charity regulation, and other matters affecting communal organisations.

When preparing responses JCoS consults as appropriate with the leadership of the Scottish Orthodox and Progressive communities, with relevant communal organisations such as Jewish Care Scotland, and with members of the community with particular expertise in the relevant area. The submitted responses then reflect the consensus or range of views expressed.

JCoS only comments on matters that have an impact on the Jewish community in Scotland. For example, with regard to the Middle East, the role of JCoS is not to express opinions about foreign affairs, or particular political issues, but when campaigning about the region sometimes becomes antisemitic rather than political, JCoS alerts relevant authorities to the concerns of the Scottish Jewish community.

== Activities ==
JCoS' functions generally fall into three key areas, which are reflected in its strap-line, "representing, connecting, and supporting Jewish people in Scotland":

=== Representation ===
JCoS promotes the understanding of Jewish religion, culture, and community, and works to provide information and assistance to local authorities, other faith and ethnic communities, and educational, health, and welfare bodies across the country.

JCoS represents the Jewish community in Scotland to government and other official bodies by responding to official consultations on matters that affect the community such as antisemitism and hate crime, equalities and human rights, Family Law, registration and the census, shechitah, medico-legal matters, protection of children and vulnerable adults, charity regulation, and other matters affecting communal organisations.

JCoS holds regular formal and informal contacts with Ministers, Members of the Scottish Parliament (MSPs), Member of Parliament (MPs), and civil servants, and participates in various Scottish Government equality initiatives and Scottish Parliament Cross Party Groups such as those on Race and on Human Rights.

JCoS represents the Scottish Jewish Community on a wide range of national organisations dealing with aspects of community relations, interfaith relations, Human Rights, equality matters, etc., including, amongst others, the Boards of BEMIS (the Scottish Ethnic Minority umbrella body), Interfaith Scotland, Scottish Faiths Action for Refugees and Faith in Communities Scotland. In addition, JCoS is also a member of advisory bodies such as the Joint Committee on Religious and Moral Education, the Scottish Government Death Registration Advisory Group, NHS Spiritual Care Committees, Police Scotland Community Advisor groups, and the Joint Faiths Advisory Board on Criminal Justice.

JCoS also holds meetings with senior officers and officials of the Church of Scotland, the Roman Catholic Church in Scotland, and the STUC.

SCoJeC represented the Scottish Jewish Community is assisting the National Records of Scotland with their planning for the census in 2021, by asking members of the Jewish Community to test different versions of questions of particular relevance, like whether to include "Jewish" as an option for the Ethnicity question. In 2018, SCoJeC collaborated with Jewish Policy Research (JPR) on data collection in 2018 for the significant study of antisemitism throughout Europe they conducted, together with Ipsos, for the EU Agency for Fundamental Rights (FRA).

JCoS is not a political or a religious organisation; it is the secular representative organisation of the Jewish communities in Scotland, and it responds to a wide range of issues and organisations.

JCoS makes representations on behalf of the Jewish Community in Scotland to the Scottish Government, Scottish Parliamentary committees, MSPs, and other bodies on issues concerning Jews in Scotland.

=== Connecting communities ===
JCoS works in partnership with other organisations to develop relationships between communities.

JCoS is represented on the Executive of a Scottish charity specialising in facilitating constructive engagement between different faith and belief communities across Scotland.

In 2018, SCoJeC took part in a discussion and kosher lunch hosted by Rt Rev Dr Derek Browning, the Moderator of the General Assembly of the Church of Scotland at the time. The theme of the discussion was the challenges facing all people of faith in Scotland today, and how shared hospitality offers as an example of how faiths can relate to one another. In 2010, SCoJeC sponsored a Symposium jointly with the Roman Catholic Archdiocese of Glasgow, to mark the 45th anniversary of the historic Nostra aetate, the ground-breaking declaration by Pope John XXIII following the Second Vatican Council, that set the scene for a complete transformation of relations between the Catholic Church and the Jewish Community.

In 2018, SCoJeC participated in a meeting of the Cross-Party Group on Tackling Islamophobia in the Scottish Parliament to discuss Shared Experiences, Shared Challenges, and Shared Ideas alongside the Muslim Council of Scotland (MCS). The meeting concluded with the signing of a joint declaration by the representatives of SCoJeC and the MCS, stating that the organisations stand together determined to end the hatred and extremism that affect us all.

=== Supporting communities ===
JCoS' work within the community aims to enable the Jewish communities in Scotland, and Jewish individuals living outwith any settled community, to connect with one another.

JCoS provides services to all of Scotland's Jewish communities, for example it assists the Community to comply with Protection of Vulnerable Groups regulations by advising communal organisations about relevant requirements, and carrying out Scheme Record applications on behalf of most voluntary organisations in the Jewish community (including all communal youth groups, synagogues, and educational organisations). JCoS also assists the Community to comply with immigration regulations by informing communal organisations about relevant requirements, and sponsoring visa applications for overseas visitors to carry out work in the community, for example to enable a visiting rabbi to perform a wedding, or to ensure that volunteer youth workers from outwith the European Economic Area can legally participate in a communal organisation's activities.

JCoS responds to requests from local authorities, NHS boards, schools, local police, etc. for information about the needs of local Jewish residents, and liaises with the Community Security Trust, the Scottish Government, the Crown Office and Procurator Fiscal Service, and Police Scotland to combat antisemitism and antisemitic incidents in Scotland.

JCoS provides educational resources, and sending accredited volunteer ambassadors to visit schools throughout Scotland, in order to promote better understanding of Judaism and the Jewish community, and organises and supports social and educational events in the smaller communities and in remote venues such as Lochgilphead, Findhorn, Oban, Skye, Shetland, Arran, and the Borders.

JCoS provides a support network for the smaller Jewish communities, for individuals and families who live in rural areas and outwith any Jewish community, and for those in and around the main conurbations who have chosen not to join the formally organised communities. It also works in partnership with other Jewish community organisations in Scotland such as Jewish Student Chaplaincy Scotland, the Edinburgh Hebrew Congregation and Limmud Scotland in promoting outreach.

SCoJeC formerly published a quarterly newsletter which provides information about events and activities across Scotland. SCoJeC also conducted several small-scale inquiries with funding from the Scottish Government, to find out about the variety of experience of Jewish people in Scotland, and encourage them to identify the issues that are important to them, most recently in 2020. These studies provided an opportunity for Jewish people from throughout Scotland to address some concerns about security and about their relationships with the wider community.

JCoS, and formerly SCoJeC, holds events throughout Scotland aimed at connecting the Jewish community. For example, SCoJeC played a central role in the Jewish Gathering hosted by Edinburgh Hebrew Congregation in October 2018 in Edinburgh, a first nationwide get-together for Scottish Jews, bringing together around 160 Jewish people from all over Scotland.

=== Educational resources ===
JCoS aims to increase understanding and communication around Jewish life and belief. JCoS offers Educational Resources such as information sessions and activities about Judaism for school and community groups.

JCoS has an undergoing educational project that consists of training Jewish volunteers to deliver educational talks and activities about their faith and community to schools and other groups, and to represent the Jewish community at interfaith events. Jewish topics discussed in these sessions include Shabbat and the Jewish Festivals, Jewish Life Cycle, Synagogues, and Kosher food and other aspects of daily life.

SCoJeC also developed JOES Boxes (Jewish Objects for Education in Scotland), which were designed to include a range of objects such as Shabbat Candlesticks, Havdalah sets, Torah scrolls or Chanukiah, to develop interest about Judaism and understanding of the Jewish way of life. As the boxes were designed to be an educational resource, they are provided to every local council in Scotland, and backed up by an additional web resource.

== See also ==
- History of the Jews in Scotland
- Board of Deputies of British Jews
- British Jews
- European Jewish Congress
- Institute for Jewish Policy Research
- Judaism
