= List of historians and classicists associated with Balliol College, Oxford =

This is a list of notable people associated with Balliol College, Oxford, who were historians and classicists.

== Historians ==
=== Political, social and economic historians ===
Image	Name	Join Date	Field of work	Comments	Ref.
	Sir O. M. Edwards	1884	History of Wales	Chief Inspector of Schools for Wales; MP for Merionethshire	
	R. H. Tawney	1899	Christian socialism	Protestantism and the rise of capitalism "Tawney exercised the widest influence of any historian of his time, politically, socially and, above all, educationally"	
	Arnold J. Toynbee	1907	international relations	FBA; Professor LSE "A Study of History"	
	Sir Lewis Namier	1908	The History of Parliament	The Structure of Politics in the C18th; History of Parliament	
	Sir Denis Brogan	1923	History of the United States government	"The American Political System 1933	
	Peter Calvocoressi	1931	Post–Cold War era	World Politics Since 1945; World Politics 1945-2000	
	Fin Crisp	1938	Political science	Rhodes Scholar, "The Parliamentary Government of the Commonwealth of Australia" 1949	
	Hugh Stretton	1946	Urban history	"one of Australia's leading public intellectuals"	
	R. M. Hartwell	1948	Industrial Revolution	"The Rising Standard of Living in England, 1800–1850" (1961)	
	Raphael Samuel	1952	Working Class	" one of the most outstanding, original intellectuals of his generation "	
	Arthur Marwick	1957	Historiographer	"The New Nature of History" 1971	
	Maxine Berg	2009	Industrial Revolution	FBA, Warwick University Professor	

=== European history ===
Image	Name	Join Date	Field of work	Comments	Ref.
	James H. Billington	1950	History of Russia	Rhodes Scholar, 13th Librarian of Congress	
	Martin Conway	1990	History of Belgium	Fellow	
	Geoff Eley	1967	History of Germany		
	Jeremy Lawrance	1971	History of Spain	FBA	
	Philip Nord	1971	History of France		
	Anthony Teasdale	1975	History of the European Union		
	Frank McDonough	1985	Second World War		
	Timothy D. Snyder	1995	Central Europe	Marshall Scholar, FBA, Fellow, Yale Professor	
	Lyndal Roper	2002	Germany	Rhodes Scholar, FBA, Fellow; Regius Professor of History, Oxford	
	Sophie Marnette	2004	Medieval French	Fellow; Professor of Medieval French Studies; Speech and Thought Presentation in French: Concept and Strategies	

=== Colonial historians ===
Image	Name	Join Date	Field of work	Comments	Ref.
	Donald Creighton	1925	History of Canada	Warned against American domination	
	Max Crawford	1927	History of Australia	first secretary to the Australian legation in the Soviet Union WW2	
	Thomas Lionel Hodgkin	1928	History of Africa	Fellow; Husband of Nobel Prize winner Dorothy Hodgkin son of historian Robert Howard Hodgkin and grandson of historian Thomas Hodgkin; Did "more than anyone to establish the serious study of African history"	
	Sir Keith Hancock	1921	British Empire	Chichele Professor of Economic History, "The British War Economy" 1949	
	John La Nauze	1932	History of Australia	Rhodes Scholar "Political Economy in Australia" 1949	
	Daniel J. Boorstin	1934	History of America	12th Librarian of Congress	
	Manning Clark	1938	History of Australia	"Australia's most famous historian"	
	Tapan Raychaudhuri	1953	History of India		
	C. A. Bayly	1963	British Empire		
	Ronald Robinson	1971	British Empire	FBA, Fellow	

=== Modern historians ===
Image	Name	Join date	Field of work	Comments	Ref.
	John Keegan	1953	Military history	Lecturer, Sandhurst Defence Correspondent, The Telegraph Visiting professor, Princeton, Vassar	
	Bernard Wasserstein	1966	Jewish history		
	Peter Hayes	1968	The Holocaust		
	Christopher Catherwood	1973	History of religion World War II	Writer, independent scholar based at Churchill College, Cambridge	
	Dominic Sandbrook	1992	history podcaster	"The Rest is History"	
	Dan Snow	1998	popular historian	son of Peter Snow 1958	

=== Early modern historians ===
Image	Name	Join Date	Field of work	Comments	Ref.
	Robin Briggs	1961	European witchcraft	Fellow of All Souls	
	Vivian Hunter Galbraith	1910	Domesday Book	Regius Professor of Modern History	
	Christopher Hill	1931	English Civil War	FBA, Master of Balliol, Marxist "Intellectual Origins of the English Revolution" 1965 rev 1996	
	Gerald Aylmer	1943	17th Century	FBA, Fellow "Rebellion or Revolution?" 1986	
	Sir Keith Thomas	1952	History of Religion	FBA, Hon Fellow "Religion and the Decline of Magic"	
	Suzannah Lipscomb	2009	Tudor dynasty	"Not Just the Tudors"	

=== Medievalists ===
Image	Name	Join Date	Field of work	Comments	Ref.
	H. W. C. Davis	1891	Medieval Europe	Fellow, All Souls' 1895, lecturer, New College 1897, Fellow, Balliol 1902; War service in the War Trade Intelligence Department; Editor, Dictionary of National Biography; Professor of Modern History, University of Manchester 1921–1925, Regius Professor of History, Oxford University and Fellow, Oriel. "History of Balliol College" 1899; Known as Fluffy;father of R. H. C. Davis	retrieved 14 December 2024
	Robert Howard Hodgkin	1895	Anglo-Saxons	Fellow at Queen's College father of Thomas Lionel Hodgkin ""Elizabeth of Bohemia" 1901	
	F. M. Powicke	1899	13th Century	FBA, Fellow of Merton College; Regius Professor of Modern History "The Loss of Normandy" 1913	
	Richard Southern	1929	Middle Ages	FBA, Fellow; Chichele Professor of Modern History "The Making of the Middle Ages"	
	R. H. C. Davis	1937	Medieval Europe	FBA, Fellow at Merton College; Professor at Birmingham; Son of H. W. C. Davis 1891 "The Normans and their Myth" 1976	
	Rodney Hilton	1935	Feudalism	FBA, Fellow, Marxist "Class Conflict and the Crisis of Feudalism" 1985	
	Maurice Keen	1954	Chivalry	FBA, Fellow "English Society in the later Middle Ages" 1990	
	Jeremy Catto	1958	History of Education	Fellow at Oriel College "The History of the University of Oxford"	
	Patrick Wormald	1966	Anglo-Saxons	"The Making of English Law: King Alfred to the Twelfth Century"	
	David d'Avray	1973	Christianity in the Middle Ages	Emeritus Professor at University College London	
	Lesley Abrams	2000	Scandinavian history	Fellow; Professor of Early Medieval History The Anglo-Saxons and the Christianization of Scandinavia	

== Classicists ==
Image	Name	Join Date	Field of work	Comments	Ref.
	William Young Sellar	1842	Latin poetry	FRSE Professor of Humanity at Edinburgh University	
	Robinson Ellis	1852	Classical Latin	Catullus Corpus Professor of Latin	
	David Binning Monro	1854	Homer	FBA Vice-Chancellor	
	Robert Scott	1835	Philology	Master "A Greek-English Lexicon"	
	William Hardie	1880	Classics	Fellow Professor of Humanity at Edinburgh University	
	Sir George Macdonald	1883	Archaeology	FBA Numismatics; Antonine Wall	
	Cyril Bailey	1890	Latin	Fellow 1902-1939; Public Orator, Oxford University 1932-39 Chair, LMH 1931-39 Oxford Latin Dictionary	
	Sir Arthur Wallace Pickard-Cambridge	1891	Theatre of ancient Greece	FBA, Fellow Professor of Greek,Edinburgh; Vice-Chancellor, Sheffield	
	Sir John Beazley	1903	Archaeology	CH, FBA; Oxford Professor of Classical Archaeology Attic Vases	
	H. J. Rose	1904	Greek mythology	Rhodes Scholar, FBA chess player "A Handbook of Greek Mythology"	
	Edgar Lobel	1907	Classical Philology	Hon Fellow declined knighthood Oxyrhynchus Papyri	
	Roland Gregory Austin	1919	Philology	Virgil, Professor, Liverpool University	
	Sir Roger Mynors	1922	Classical Latin	FBA, Fellow; Corpus Christi Professor of Latin "Catalogue of the Manuscripts at Balliol College, Oxford" 1963	
	Richard William Hunt	1927	Paleography	Fellow Keeper of the Western Manuscripts at the Bodleian Library	
	William Watt	1933	Classics	FBA, Fellow; Regius Professor of Humanity, Aberdeen	
	Sir Kenneth Dover	1938	Ancient Greek	Fellow, President British Academy "Greek Homosexuality" 1978	
	Russell Meiggs	1939	Ancient history	Fellow " Trees and timber in the ancient Mediterranean world " 1982	
	Robin Nisbet	1947	Classical Latin	FBA, Snell Exhibitioner; Corpus Christi Professor of Latin	
	Martin Litchfield West	1955	Ancient Greek	OM, FBA,"a man of few words in seven languages"	
	Jasper Griffin	1956	Classics	FBA, Fellow, Public Orator	
	Glen Bowersock	1957	Ancient history	Rhodes Scholar, Honorary Fellow	
	Timothy Barnes	1960	History of Christianity	FBA, Professor Toronto University	
	Jonathan Barnes	1961	Aristotle	FBA, Fellow, Professor of Ancient Philosophy at Oxford from 1989-94 and at the Sorbonne 2002-6; Revised the Oxford Aristotle, universally recognised as the standard English version, in light of modern scholarship The Complete Works of Aristotle, 2 vols, 1984; reprinted with corrections, 1995	
	Oliver Lyne	1971	Latin poetry	Fellow; Professor of Classical Languages and Literature	
	Emily Wilson	1990	Odyssey Illiad	MacArthur Fellow Professor UPenn	
	Rosalind Thomas	2004	Greek History	Fellow; Professor of Greek History Oral Tradition and Written Record in Classical Athens 1989	
