= List of academics of Balliol College, Oxford =

This is a list of Balliol College academics, people who have had teaching roles at Balliol College, Oxford or Balliol alumni who have held a senior position in secondary education.

== College and University teachers ==
Image	Name	Join Date	Role	Comments	Refs
	Philip N. Howard	2015		Professor of Internet Studies sociologist	
	Peter Tufano	2012		Peter Moores Dean and Professor of Finance at Saïd Business School social entrepreneur	
	Rosalind Thomas	2004		classicist Professor of Greek	
	Lyndal Roper	2002		Regius Professor of History	
	James Forder	1997	Fellow and Tutor in Economics	Editor, Oxford Economic Papers	
	Judith M. Brown	1990	Fellow and Tutor in History	Professor of Commonwealth History	
	Mike Woodin	1990	Tutor in Psychology	Green Party leader	
	SirAdam Roberts	1985		Professor of International Relations at Oxford	
	Richard Gombrich	1976		Indologist, Professor of Sanskrit	
	Hedley Bull	1977		Professor of International Relationas	
	Alvin Plantinga	1975	Visiting Fellow	analytic Christian philosopher	
	Joseph Raz	1972	Fellow and tutor in Jurisprudence	Professor of the Philosophy of Law	
	Oliver Lyne	1971	tutor in Classics	Professor of Classical Languages and Literature	
	Bryan Magee	1970	Tutor in Philosophy	British philosopher, broadcaster, MP and author	
	Andrew Graham	1969	Master of Balliol; Fellow and Tutor in Economics	political economist	
	Colin Renshaw Lucas	1969	Master of Balliol; Vice-Chancellor Oxford University	historian Warden Rhodes House	
	Oswyn Murray	1968		classicist, joint editor of the Oxford History of the Classical World	
	Arthur Prior	1966	Tutor in Philosophy	New Zealand–born logician and philosopher	
	Roger Cashmore	1965		experimental physicist	
	Anthony Kenny	1964	Master of Balliol	Philosopher	
	Denis Noble	1963		British physiologist and biologist	
	Jasper Griffin	1956		classicist	
	Baruch Blumberg	1955	Master of Balliol	doctor and co-recipient of the 1976 Nobel Prize in Physiology or Medicine	
	Linus Pauling	1947	Eastman Professor	chemist, Nobel prize winner	
	Baron Thomas Balogh	1940	Fellow in Economics	Keynesian economist founder Oxford Institute of Statistics; Chair Fabian Society member of the House of Lords	
	Heinrich Zimmer	1939		German Indologist and linguist	
	Felix Frankfurter	1933	Eastman Professor	judge US Supreme Court	
	Christopher Hill	1931	Master of Balliol	Marxist historian	
	Vivian Hunter Galbraith	1910		historian	
	Roy Ridley	1909		writer and poet Newdigate Prize	
	Arnold Toynbee	1907		economic historian	
	Frederick Temple	1900		Archbishop of Canterbury	
	Henry William Carless Davis	1891		historian	
	William Hardie	1880		classical scholar	
	Thomas Kelly Cheyne	1865		divine	
	Baron Charles Bowen	1853	Visitor 1885	judge	
	Lewis Campbell	1849		classicist	
	William Charles Salter	1842		last Principal of St Alban Hall	
	Ralph Wheeler Robert Lingen, 1st Baron Lingen	1841		civil servant	
	Benjamin Jowett	1835	Master of Balliol	theologian	
	William George Ward	1834		Theologian and mathematician	
	Herman Merivale	1828		English civil servant and historian	
	Adam Smith	1740		Economist, philosopher	

== Educators and school teachers ==
Image	Name	Join date	Institution	Notes	Refs
	Nick Bevan	1960	Shiplake College	Headmaster	
	Alec Peterson	1926	International Baccalaureate	Head of Oxford University Department of Education	
	John Fulton	1923	British Council	Chair of British Council	
	Robert Birley	1922	Charterhouse; Eton College	Headmaster; Professor, City University	
	Sir Henry Marten	1891	Eton College	Provost of Eton; Tutor to Princess Elizabeth, later Queen Elizabeth II	
	Richard Powell Francis	1879	Brisbane Grammar School	First Australian member of Balliol to graduate.	
	George Ferris Whidborne Mortimer	1823	City of London School	Headmaster; abolitionist "The Immediate Abolition of Slavery Compatible with the Safety and Prosperity of the Colonies" (1833)	
	Richard Jenkyns	1800	Balliol College	Master, educational innovator	
