= Edinburgh Synagogue =

Orthodox synagogue in Edinburgh, Scotland, United Kingdom

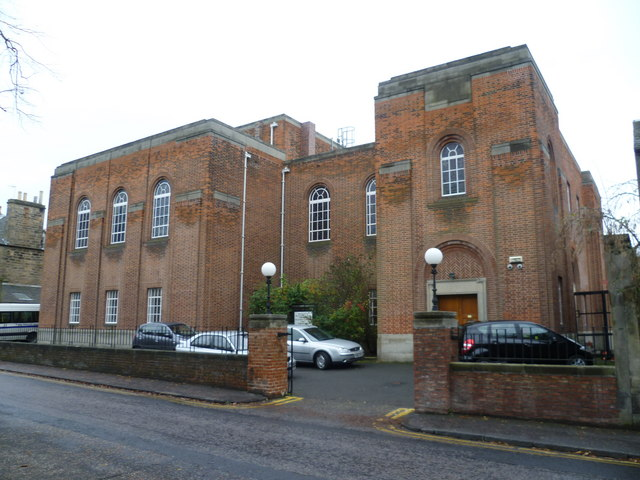
- The Edinburgh Synagogue, in 2012

- Location in Scotland

Religion
- Affiliation: Orthodox Judaism
- Rite: Nusach Ashkenaz
- Ecclesiastical or organizational status: Synagogue
- Ownership: Edinburgh Hebrew Congregation
- Leadership: Rabbi David Rose
- Status: Active
- Notable artworks: Stained-glass windows by William Wilson

Location
- Location: 4a Salisbury Road, Newington, Edinburgh, Scotland
- Country: United Kingdom
- Interactive map of Edinburgh Synagogue
- Coordinates: 55°56′18″N 3°10′28″W

Architecture
- Architect: James Miller (1932)
- Type: Synagogue architecture
- Style: Byzantine Revival
- Established: 1816 (as a congregation)
- Groundbreaking: 1817 (Richmond Court); 1868 (Park Place); 1898 (Graham Street); 1932 (Salisbury Road)
- Construction cost: £20,000

Specifications
- Capacity: 1,000 worshipers
- Dome: One
- Materials: Red brick

Website
- ehcong.com

Listed Building – Category B
- Official name: 4 SALISBURY ROAD, SYNAGOGUE CHAMBERS INCLUDING GATEPIERS AND BOUNDARY WALLS
- Type: Listed Building
- Designated: 29 March 1996
- Reference no.: LB43172

The Edinburgh Synagogue is an Orthodox Jewish congregation and synagogue, located at 4a Salisbury Road in the Newington area of Edinburgh, Scotland, in the United Kingdom. Established in 1816 as the Edinburgh Hebrew Congregation, the congregation worships in the Ashkenazi rite, under the auspices of the Chief Rabbi of the United Hebrew Congregations of the Commonwealth.

The current synagogue building was opened in 1932, replacing a converted chapel on Graham Street which had served as the synagogue since 1898.

== Early history ==
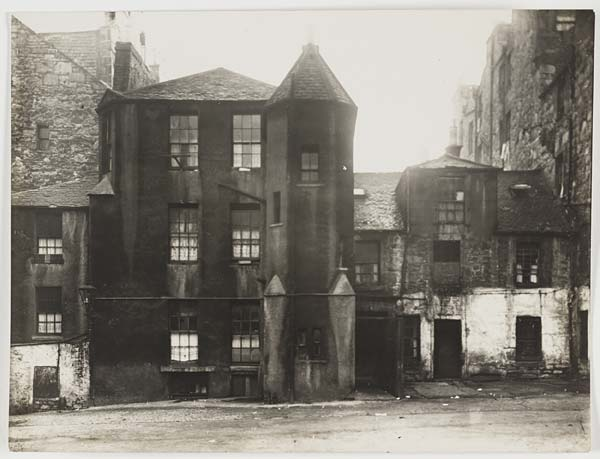
Synagogue at Richmond Court

The Edinburgh Hebrew Congregation, the city's first synagogue, was established in 1817 at Richmond Court for a congregation of 20 families. In 1868, the congregation moved to larger accommodation at Ross House, Park Place. before moving again in 1898 to Graham Street.

Between 1881 and 1914, immigrants arrived in large numbers to Edinburgh. They brought different religious traditions with them. As a result, other congregations began to form. Some of these Jews migrated from within Britain. In 1879, Hasidic Jews from Manchester who had come to work in the Caledonian Rubber Works on Fountainbridge established a synagogue in the Dalry area on Caledonian Crescent. This synagogue served about 35 families. However, a majority of the migrant population came from the Pale of Settlement in Eastern Europe. In 1890, the Eastern European migrants established Edinburgh New Hebrew Congregation in Richmond Court. It was eventually moved to Roxburgh Place in 1916.

== Current building ==
In 1918, the Edinburgh Hebrew Congregation and the Edinburgh New Hebrew Congregation unified on paper but continued to worship in separate places given their different practices.

Under Rabbi Salis Daiches in October 1926 the community formed a fundraising committee to build a larger synagogue. In November 1928 the site at 4 Salisbury Road, Newington was purchased. The Roxburgh Place synagogue closed in March 1929 and a "Beth Hamedrash" (literally House of Study) opened in an existing house on the site.

Construction of the new synagogue began on 3 May 1931 when Walter Samuel, 2nd Viscount Bearsted laid the foundation stone. The synagogue took 15 months to complete and was opened on 11 September 1932 by Chief Rabbi Joseph Hertz. It was designed by the Glasgow architect James Miller; the synagogue is one of only two buildings he designed in Edinburgh. The purpose-built synagogue could hold 1,000 people and also had a mikveh (Jewish ritual bath) on the premises. Faced in red brick it is built in a simplified Byzantine Revival style with a large central dome suspended from the flat roof by steel hangers which floods the building with light.

In 1981, Michael Henderson of Dick, Peddie & McKay was hired to reduce the interior. While the mikveh was in disuse by this point, it was retained and in 2003 came back into use when the synagogue was renovated again with the help of a £300,000 grant from the Heritage Lottery Fund.

The synagogue was listed in 1996 as a grade B listed building.

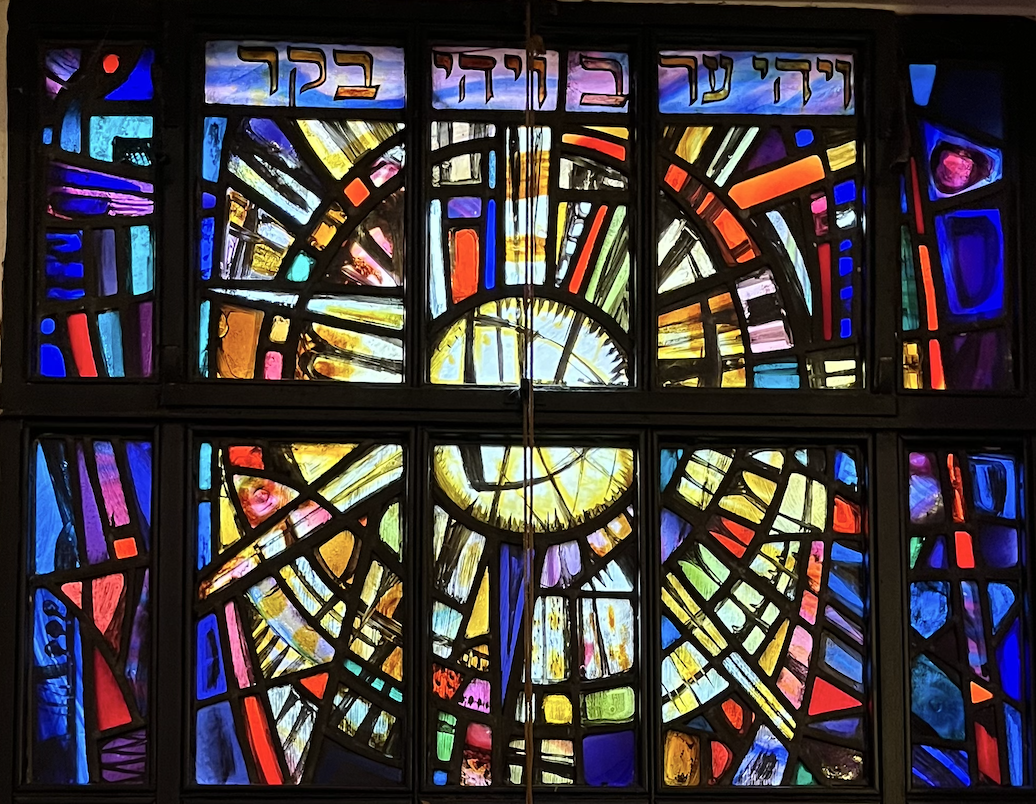
William Wilson stained glass window

=== Stained glass windows ===
The synagogue houses six stained glass windows by the Scottish artist William Wilson which combine Jewish religious symbols with abstract and floral motifs, with one depicting the act of Creation.

== See also ==
- List of Jewish communities in the United Kingdom
- History of the Jews in Scotland
- Scottish Council of Jewish Communities
