= The Eternal Priesthood =

1883 book by Henry Edward Manning

- Title page for, The Eternal Priesthood (1883)
- Author: Henry Edward Manning
- Language: English
- Subject: Priesthood in the Catholic Church
- Publisher: Burns & Oates
- Publication date: 1883
- Publication place: United Kingdom
- Pages: 286
- Text: The Eternal Priesthood at Wikisource

The Eternal Priesthood is a book by Cardinal Henry Edward Manning, first published in 1883, discussing the Catholic priesthood. The book defends a high ideal of priesthood, while warning of the dangers of failing to meet its rigorous obligations.

== Content ==
The book reflects an elevated view of the priesthood similar to that espoused by Pierre de Bérulle, and defends the thesis "that the ministerial priesthood is, in and of itself, an outstanding way to perfection, and even a 'state of perfection'". The priest, Manning argues, is called to the highest human office as "express image of Christ" and "ambassador of God", and the book explains the "stringent obligations" by which a priest is "bound to the life of perfection". Priests who fail in their morality suffer consequences proportionate to their high duties: "Since Satan fell like lightning from heaven there has been no fall like the fall of a priest."

The Eternal Priesthood also emphasises the wider role of priests as members of communities. The condition of a priest living alone, Manning argues, is "abnormal [and] unecclesiastical", and priests must play an active part in society, avoiding the tendency to become "mere Mass priests and hucksters of sacraments".

== Influence ==
The Eternal Priesthood was Manning's most influential work, going through 19 editions by 1924, and was translated into most European languages—by S. A. M. Adshead's estimation, the book sold more copies at the time than any work by John Henry Newman except the Apologia Pro Vita Sua. An anonymous academic reviewer in 1986 remarked that The Eternal Priesthood was "probably the only one [of Manning's works] that is now remembered".
