= Noah Bridges =

British stenographer and mathematician

Noah Bridges (fl. 1661), was a stenographer and mathematician.

Bridges was educated at Balliol College, Oxford, and acted as clerk of the parliament which sat in that city in 1643 and 1644. He was created B.C.L. on 17 June 1646, 'being at that time esteemed a most faithful subject to his majesty.' He was in attendance on King Charles I in most of his restraints, particularly at Newcastle and the Isle of Wight (State Papers, Dom., Charles II, vol. xx. art. 126). His majesty granted him the office of clerk of the House of Commons, but the appointment failed to pass the great seal because of the surrender of Oxford. It appears that the king also promised him the post of comptroller, teller, and weigher of the Mint. After the Restoration he vainly endeavoured to obtain the grant of these offices with survivorship to his son Japhet. For several years he kept a school at Putney, where he was living in 1661.

== Written works ==
- 'Vulgar Arithmetique, explayning the Secrets of that Art, after a more exact and easie way than ever,' London, 1653, 12mo. A portrait of the author is prefixed.
- 'Stenographie and Cryptographie: or the Arts of Short and Secret Writing. The first laid down in a method familiar to meane capacities; the second added to convince and cautionate the credulous and the confident …' London, 1659, 16mo. This extremely scarce work is dedicated to Sir Orlando Bridgeman. The address to the reader is thus most curiously dated: 'March 18/59 the first of the four last months of 13 yeares squandered in the Valley of Fortune.' A second edition, which has escaped the notice of bibliographers, appeared with this title: 'Stenography and Cryptography. The Arts of Short and Secret Writing. The second Edition enlarged, with a familiar Method teaching how to cypher and decipher all private Transactions. Wherein are inserted the Keys by which the Lines of Text-Writing affixed to those Cyphers are folded and unfolded,' London, 1662.
- 'Lux Mercatoria, Arithmetick Natural and Decimal …' London, 1661, 8vo. With a fine portrait of the author, engraved by Faithorne. This portrait was re-engraved as Milton, for Duroveray's edition of 'Paradise Lost.'
