= Closing the Gap: The Quest to Understand Prime Numbers =

Book on prime numbers

- Author: Vicky Neale
- Subject: Prime numbers and prime gaps
- Publisher: Oxford University Press
- Publication date: 2017
- ISBN: 9780198788287

Closing the Gap: The Quest to Understand Prime Numbers is a book on prime numbers and prime gaps by Vicky Neale, published in 2017 by the Oxford University Press. The Basic Library List Committee of the Mathematical Association of America has suggested that it be included in undergraduate mathematics libraries.

== Topics ==
The main topic of the book is the conjecture that there exist infinitely many twin primes, dating back at least to Alphonse de Polignac (who conjectured more generally in 1849 that every even number appears infinitely often as the difference between two primes), and the significant progress made recently by Yitang Zhang and others on this problem. Zhang did not solve the twin prime conjecture, but in 2013 he announced a proof that there exists an even number $k$ that is the difference between infinitely many pairs of primes. Zhang's original proof shows only that $k$ is less than 70 million, but subsequent work by others including the highly collaborative efforts of the Polymath Project reduced this bound to 246, or even, assuming the truth of the Elliott–Halberstam conjecture, to 6.

The book is structured with chapters that alternate between giving the chronological development of the twin prime problem, and providing mathematical background on related topics in number theory; reviewer Michael N. Fried describes this unusual structure as a rondo with the chronological sequence as its refrain and the mathematical parts as its verses. The mathematical topics covered in these chapters include Goldbach's conjecture that every even number is the sum of two primes, sums of squares and Waring's problem on representation by sums of powers, the Hardy–Littlewood circle method for comparing the area of a circle to the number of integer points in the circle and solving analogous problems in analytic number theory, the arithmetic of quaternions, Fermat’s Last Theorem, the fundamental theorem of arithmetic on the existence and uniqueness of prime factorizations, almost primes, Sophie Germain primes, Pythagorean triples, and Szemerédi's theorem and its connections to primes in arithmetic progression.

Beyond its mathematical content, another theme of the book involves understanding the processes that mathematicians use to develop their mathematics, and "what it means to do research in mathematics", ranging from the stereotypical "single mathematician working on his own" exemplified by Zhang, to the global networked collaboration of the Polymath Project.

== Audience and reception ==
The book is written for a general audience untrained in mathematics, and in many cases finds clever and accessible ways of explaining mathematical concepts using visual intuition, although in other cases she uses complicated formulas and algebra that could be intimidating. The book could also be of interest to mathematics students and professional mathematicians, and reviewer Michael N. Fried suggests that it could be helpful to mathematics educators in deepening their knowledge of mathematics, providing creative visual demonstrations of mathematical concepts, and inspiring collaborative techniques in education.

Reviewer Mark Hunacek writes that Neale's "prose is clear but not patronizing, precise but accessible. The result is a very enjoyable book". Fried calls it "consistently entertaining and enlightening", and reviewer Marianne Freiberger calls it "among the clearest popular accounts of maths I've read".
