= List of sports and mind sports people associated with Balliol College, Oxford =

This is a list of sports and mind sports people associated with Balliol College, Oxford.

== Balliol Olympians ==
Image	Name	Join date	Sport	Representing	Olympics	Refs
	Caryn Davies	2013	rowing women's eight	USA	2004, 2008, 2012	
	Justin Frishberg	1991	wheelchair rugby	UK	2004, 2008	
	Matthew Syed	1991	table tennis	UK	1992, 2000	
	King Harald V	1960	sailing 5.5m yacht	Norway	1964, 1968, 1972	
	Jonathan Hutton	1960	pole vault	UK	1964	
	Graham Bond	1961; Rhodes Scholar	gymnastics	Australia	1956, 1960, 1964	
	Richard Wheadon	1932	rowing men's eight	UK	1956	
	Eng-Liang Tan	1961; Rhodes Scholar	water polo	Singapore	1956	
	Norwood Hallowell	1932	1500m Olympic Record	USA	1932	
	Wilfred Kalaugher	1927; Rhodes Scholar	triple jump, 110m hurdles first class cricketer	New Zealand	1928	
	King Olav V	1924	sailing 6m mixed	Norway	1928	
	David Johnson	1923; Rhodes Scholar	400m	Canada	1924	
	Bill Stevenson	1922; Rhodes Scholar	400m	USA	1924	
	Alan Valentine	1922	rugby	USA	1924	
	Wilfrid Johnson	1904	lacrosse	UK	1908	
	Frederick S. Kelly	1899; Australia	rowing men's eight	UK	1908	
	William Grenfell (Lord Desborough)	1874	fencing	UK	1906	

== Field sports ==
Image	Name	Join date	Sport	Representing	Role	Refs
	Richard Sharp	1959	rugby union	England	captain	
	Mansoor Ali Khan Pataudi known as "Tiger"	1959	cricket	India	captain	
	Iftikhar Ali Khan Pataudi	1927	cricket	India	captain	
	Alan Rotherham	1881	rugby union	England	captain	

== Mind sports ==
Image	Name	Join date	Sport	Representing	Notes	Refs
	Raaphi Persitz	1953	chess	Israel	financial journalist and chess writer	
	Leonard Barden	1949	chess	England	chess organiser and columnist	
	Sir Theodore Tylor	1918	chess	England	blind jurisprudence don	
	H. J. R. Murray	1886	chess		school inspector Wrote the definitive "A History of Chess"	
