= List of lawyers and judges associated with Balliol College, Oxford =

This is a list of lawyers and judges associated with Balliol College, Oxford.

== Judges ==
| Image | Name | Join Date | Role | Dicta | Refs |
|---|---|---|---|---|---|
| | Julian Knowles | 1987 | High Court Judge | the police's treatment of the Claimant thereafter disproportionately interfered with his right of freedom of expression, which is an essential component of democracy | |
| | Robert Reed | 1978 | President of the Supreme Court | a decision to prorogue Parliament will be unlawful if the prorogation has the effect of frustrating or preventing, without reasonable justification, the ability of Parliament to carry out its constitutional functions as a legislature | |
| | Alan Rodger | 1969 | Justice of the Supreme Court | just as male heterosexuals are free to enjoy themselves playing rugby, drinking beer and talking about girls with their mates, so male homosexuals are to be free to enjoy themselves going to Kylie concerts, drinking exotically coloured cocktails and talking about boys with their straight female mates. | |
| | William Nimmo Smith | 1961 | Judge of Supreme Courts of Justice, Scotland | We find it impossible to accept that there are categories of person, such as footballers, of whom it may be said, a priori and without other evidence, that they are "celebrities" | |
| | Mathew Thorpe | 1957 | Lord Justice of Appeal | the very different role and functions of men and women, and the reality that those who sacrifice the opportunity to provide full-time care for their children in favour of a highly competitive professional race do question the purpose of all that striving, and question whether they should not re-evaluate their life before the children have grown too old to benefit | |
| | Sir Henry Brooke | 1957 | Lord Justice of Appeal | The networked computer, supplied for the purposes of managing the court's current caseload, is surely going to be as important a judicial tool for the procedural judge in the new Millennium as the quill-pen and the chamber-pot behind the screen in the corner of the court was to the judges of Charles Dickens's day | |
| | Thomas Bingham | 1954 | Lord Chief Justice | "head and shoulders above everybody else in the Law in my view…yes just outstanding…his clarity of thought, his academic knowledge. I think almost everyone would say that he was, you know, the great lawyer of his generation" (Nick Phillips} "there are no circumstances in which a judge is entitled to direct a jury to return a verdict of guilty" | |
| | Brian Hutton | 1950 | Lord Chief Justice of Northern Ireland | I am satisfied that Dr Kelly took his own life and that the principal cause of death was bleeding from incised wounds to his left wrist which Dr Kelly had inflicted on himself with the knife found beside his body. The Hutton Enquiry Report 2004 | |
| | Alan Stewart Orr | 1933 | Lord Justice of Appeal | Alan Orr was a quiet unassuming judge of exceptional quality. His career reminds us that good judges do not need, and are often better without, a charismatic public personality. In court he listened, he perceived truth with a quick and accurate mind and he knew the law: the result was findings of fact based on a detailed and perceptive understanding of the evidence, with the law applied accurately and lucidly. Not many appeals against an Orr judgement succeeded. | |
| | John Marshall Harlan II | 1920 Rhodes Scholar | Associate Justice of the US Supreme Court | Fellow, American Academy of Arts and Sciences Divorced from their 'prurient interest' appeal to the unfortunate persons whose patronage they were aimed at capturing (a separate issue), these portrayals of the male nude cannot fairly be regarded as more objectionable than many portrayals of the female nude that society tolerates. | |
| | Raymond Evershed | 1919 | Master of the Rolls | Answering the question whether a right to use a park satisfied the qualities of an easement, Evershed M.R. held, 'Its use for the purposes, not only of exercise and rest but also for such domestic purposes as were suggested in argument—for example, for taking out small children in perambulators or otherwise—is not fairly to be described as one of mere recreation or amusement, and is clearly beneficial to the premises to which it is attached'. | ^{: 362} |
| | Charles Bowen | 1853 | Lord Justice of Appeal | Coined the phrase "the man on the Clapham omnibus" denoting the legal concept of a reasonable person. | |
| | Joseph William Chitty | 1847 | High Court Justice Liberal MP for City of Oxford 1880 | When a piece of plaster fell from the ceiling in his courtroom, he aptly quoted 'fiat justitia, ruat coelum' ('let justice be done though the heavens fall') and he once famously remarked that 'truth will sometimes leak out even through an affidavit' | |
| | John Coleridge | 1838 | Lord Chief Justice | a man has no right to declare temptation to be an excuse, though he might himself have yielded to it, nor allow compassion for the criminal to change or weaken in any manner the legal definition of the crime. It is therefore our duty to declare that the prisoners' act in this case was wilful murder, that the facts as stated in the verdict are no legal justification of the homicide; and to say that in our unanimous opinion the prisoners are upon this special verdict guilty of murder. | |
| | Henry Bathurst | 1730 | Lord High Chancellor MP for Cirencester 1735 | He was instrumental in writing the Intolerable Acts, most notably the Boston Port Act 1774 which led to the Boston Tea Party and revolution. | |
| | Thomas Coventry | 1592 | Lord Keeper of the Great Seal MP for Droitwich 1621 | In 1631 he passed sentence of death on Lord Audley who was convicted of raping his wife and committing sodomy with two of his servants | |
| | John Popham | 1549 | Lord Chief Justice 1592–1607 MP for Lyme Regis in 1558 and for Bristol in 1571 | In 1595 Popham presided over the trial of the Jesuit Robert Southwell and passed a sentence of death by hanging, drawing and quartering. He also presided over the trials of Sir Walter Raleigh (1603) and the conspirators of the Gunpowder Plot, including Guy Fawkes (1606). He was also involved in the trial at Fotheringhay Castle of Mary, Queen of Scots (1587) which resulted in her execution. | |

== Lawyers ==
| Image | Name | Join Date | Branch | Focus | Refs |
|---|---|---|---|---|---|
| | Gautam Bhatia | 2011; Rhodes Scholar | India; Constitutional law | Offend, Shock, Or Disturb: Free Speech Under the Indian Constitution 2016 Also Science fiction author | |
| | Jennifer Robinson | 2006; Rhodes Scholar | Human rights barrister | the "alphabet soup" case Julian Assange and Wikileaks "Silenced Women: Why The Law Fails Women and How to Fight Back" 2024 | |
| | Rose-Marie Belle Antoine | 1994 | Labour law | Professor of Labor Law and Offshore Financial Law pro-vice chancellor, graduate studies, University of the West Indies | |
| | Clare Moriarty | 1982 | Chief Executive Citizens Advice | Permanent Secretary at the Department of Environment, Food and Rural Affairs and then Permanent Secretary at the Department for Exiting the European Union | |
| | Joel Bakan | 1981 | Constitutional law | Professor, University of Columbia The New Corporation: How "good" corporations are bad for democracy 2020 | |
| | Simon Walsh | 1980 | Police law barrister | Magistrate | |
| | Jane Stapleton | 1980 | FBA, Fellow Law of tort | Ernest E. Smith Professor of Law at the University of Texas at Austin Master of Christ's College, Cambridge 2016-2022 | |
| | Hugh Tomlinson | 1973 | Media law Privacy law barrister | Co-founder of Matrix Chambers 2000 | |
| | George Carman | 1949 | Celebrity defence barrister | Defended Jeremy Thorpe, leader of the Liberal Party against charges of conspiracy and incitement to murder | |
| | Peter Benenson | 1939 | Human rights barrister | founder Amnesty International | |
| | Nicholas Katzenbach | 1947; Rhodes Scholar | US Attorney General | Confronted George Wallace, the governor of Alabama, who was standing in a schoolhouse door preventing the integration of black students 1963 | |
| | Courtenay Ilbert | 1860 | Constitutional law | Clerk of the House of Commons | |
| | Charles Isaac Elton | 1856 | property law antiquary MP West Somerset 1884 | "The Great Book Collectors" | |
| | Albert Venn Dicey | 1853 | Constitutional law | Professor at Oxford; Professor at LSE popularised the phrase "the rule of law" | |
