= Salis Daiches =

Litvak-born Scottish rabbi

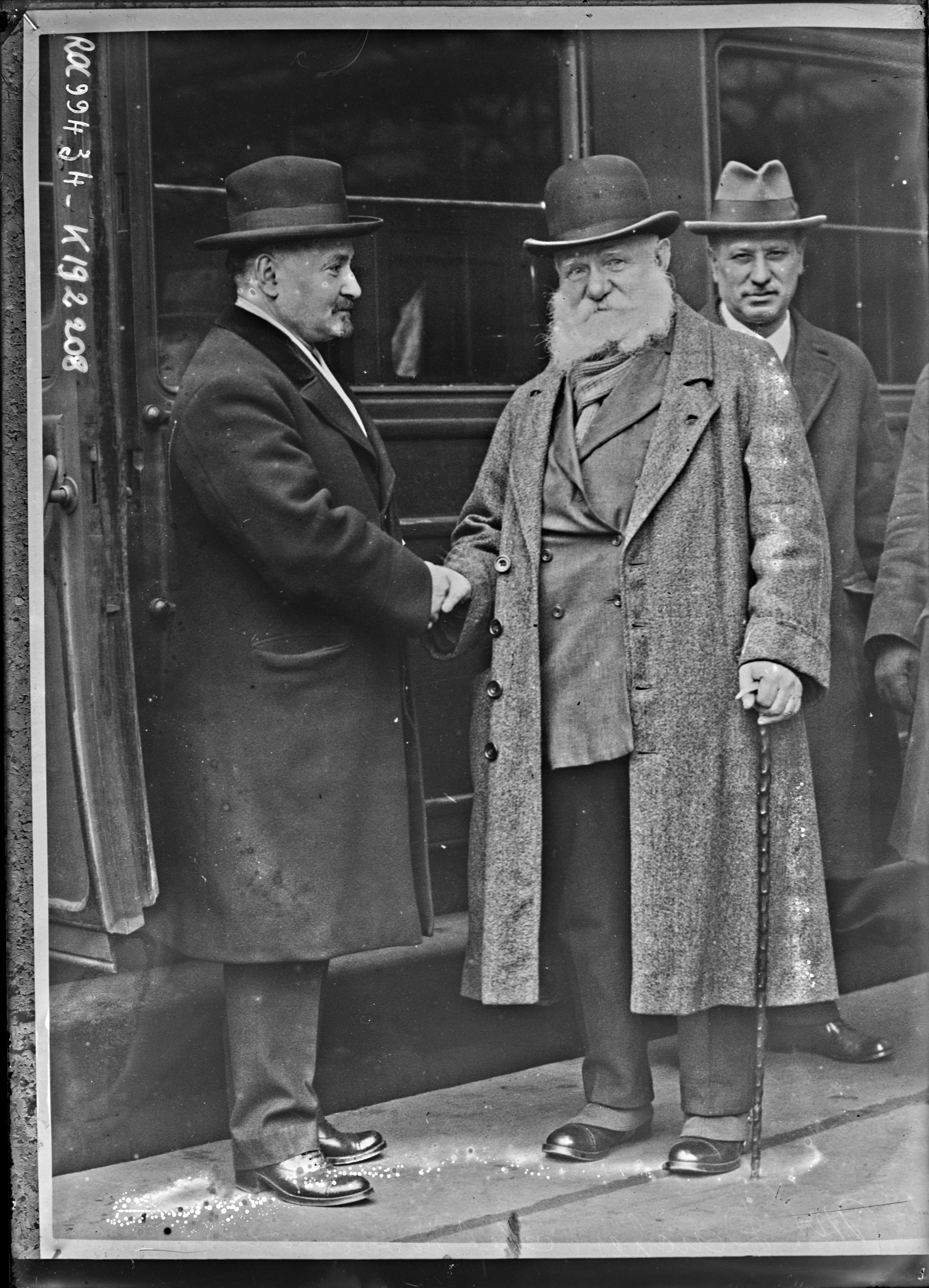
- Rabbi Daiches (left) in 1925
- Title: Rabbi

Personal life
- Born: Bezalel Daiches; 1880 Vilna, Lithuania
- Died: May 1945 (aged 64–65) Edinburgh, Scotland
- Children: Lionel Daiches, David Daiches, Sylvia Daiches
- Parents: Hayyim Daiches (father); Bella Bielitzki (mother)

Religious life
- Religion: Judaism

Jewish leader
- Synagogue: Edinburgh Hebrew Congregation
- Began: 1919
- Ended: 1945

Salis Daiches (1880–1945) was a Litvak-born Rabbi of the Edinburgh Hebrew Congregation from 1919 to 1945.

== Early life and education ==
Salis Daiches was born Bezalel Daiches in 1880 near Vilna, Lithuania in the Russian Empire to Rabbi Israel Hayyim Daiches and Bella Bielitzki as one of ten children. His early education was conducted by his father and supplemented by instruction at a German grammar school. This joint instruction allowed him to become fluent in Yiddish, Hebrew, and German.

Daiches went on to complete a transitional qualification at Kneiphöfisches Gymnasium in Königsberg, East Prussia before spending a semester studying philosophy at Alberts University. He then enrolled in the Hildesheimer Rabbinical Seminary of Berlin where he learned about modern Orthodoxy and the ideology of Torah u’maddah. During this period, he also matriculated at Königliche Friedrich-Wilhelms Universität in Berlin. Afterwards, he gained his doctorate in philosophy from the University of Leipzig. During his time at Leipzig, Daiches also began to learn English in order to complete his dissertation on the works of David Hume.

== Early career ==
In 1903, Daiches followed his parents to Leeds. After moving, he served as the minister in Kingston upon Hull and at the Sunderland Hebrew Congregation. He also briefly stood in for another rabbi for a year in Hammersmith. During this period, he became a well-known figure, lecturing across the country and regularly contributing to The Jewish Chronicle. Daiches also took part in the Conferences of Anglo-Jewish Ministers from 1909 to 1913 as a part of the Standing Committee as well as the Sub-Committee on the District Organisation of Provincial Congregations in 1911. These committees were meant to address issues caused by the recent mass migration of Eastern European Jews to the United Kingdom by providing suggestions on how to reorganise regional Jewish communities.

During these conferences, Daiches also advocated for the reform of the London Beth Din, which had halakhic authority over the British Empire. He wanted the devolution of power so that a Scottish Beth Din with its own halakhic decision-making powers could exist. The issue was no longer brought up in the conferences after 1914, but Daiches continued to lobby the Chief Rabbis.

== Edinburgh Hebrew congregation ==
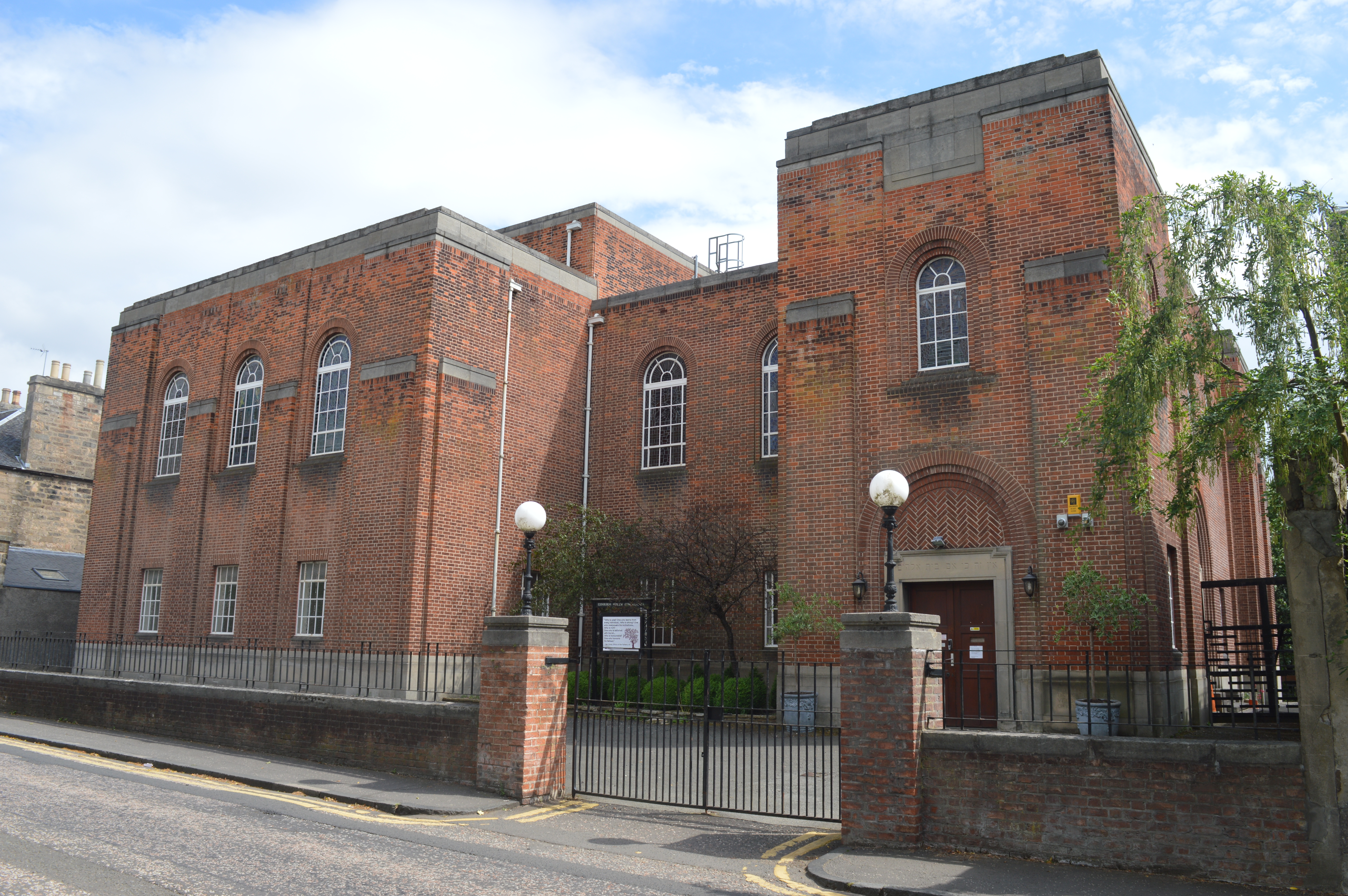
Edinburgh Hebrew Congregation Synagogue

In 1918, a delegation from the Edinburgh Hebrew Congregation offered him a position and the Chief Rabbi encouraged him to take it. The next year, Salis Daiches moved to Edinburgh to become their rabbi. Daiches, his wife, Flora, and his three children, Lionel, David, and Sylvia first moved to Lonsdale Terrace where they stayed as guests of some of the congregants. Soon after, they were able to acquire their own place at 6 Millerfield Place.

Daiches arrived to a congregation and city divided between anglicised Jews and recent Eastern European immigrants. He quickly began working on uniting the congregation, striking a balance between encouraging assimilation and respecting immigrant traditions. The congregation was not only religiously and culturally divided but physically as well. The anglicised part of the community attended Graham Street Synagogue, while the immigrant Jews went to Roxburgh Place. Therefore, each Shabbat, Daiches preached at both places, using English for the British community and Yiddish for the Eastern European Jews.

Unification gradually occurred over the course of the 1920s. In 1922, Alexander Levinson became leader of the Independent Edinburgh Hebrew Congregation, a splinter group. Daiches investigated him and found his rabbinical credentials had been invented. After Levinson refused to produce evidence of his qualifications, Daiches and the editor of the Jewish Chronicle, Leopold Greenberg, published warnings about Levinson. Levinson then sued them. The 1924 Levinson Case was ruled in favour of Daiches and the Independent Hebrew Congregation united with the Edinburgh Hebrew Congregation. In 1927, Roxburgh Place Synagogue closed. The next year, Daiches began a fundraising campaign to build Salisbury Road Synagogue which was meant to house the entire community, British and immigrant. It opened in 1932 and, the same year, he and his family moved to Crawfurd Road.

Daiches was heavily involved in both the Jewish and broader community. He preached harmony between Orthodox Jewish life and secular society. He had a high public profile, addressing learned societies, social gatherings and interest groups. The press reported on his speeches and he also wrote articles for newspapers. In some of his speeches and articles, he argued in favour of the Zionist cause and he became a well-known advocate for Zionism. This was also demonstrated by his 1925 visit to Palestine for the opening of the Hebrew University of Jerusalem. He also continuously petitioned Chief Rabbi Joseph Hertz for the creation of a Scottish Beth Din so that he could better enforce halakhic and civil law. Though he was repeatedly denied, he was given enough power that he was sometimes referred to as the “Chief Rabbi of Scotland.” He was often consulted by congregations from other cities or would intervene when there were halakhic issues.

Daiches often also was involved with the larger Presbyterian Christian community. He publicly denounced Christian missionaries that were attempting to convert poor Jewish immigrants. He also challenged the city on religious education in state schools, lobbying until Edinburgh made free Hebrew classes available four days a week at Sciennes Primary School. This also led to more mixing of immigrant and anglicised children. Despite some of these more contentious relations, Daiches also worked for Christian-Jewish harmony, especially as World War II approached. In 1938, he founded a Jewish-Christian fellowship movement with Reverend Magnus Nicholson of Fountainbridge Church in order to promote dialogue between the two communities.

== Publications ==
- Aspects of Judaism: Selected Essays. London: George Routledge & Sons Ltd, 1928
- A Hebrew Grammar for Beginners. By Rev Duncan Cameron and Rev Salis Daiches. Edinburgh: Oliver & Boyd, 1939
- The Hebrew - English edition of the Babylonian Talmud, Tractate Baba Mezi'a. By Salis Daiches & H Freedman. London: Soncino Press, 1962

== See also ==
- History of the Jews in England
- History of the Jews in Kingston upon Hull
- History of the Jews in Leeds
- History of the Jews in Manchester
- History of the Jews in North East England
- History of the Jews in Scotland
