= Stephen Grosz =

British psychoanalyst and writer

Stephen Grosz (born 1952) is a British psychoanalyst and author.

Born in Indiana, United States, and educated at the University of California, Berkeley and Balliol College, Oxford, Grosz teaches clinical technique at the Institute of Psychoanalysis and psychoanalytic theory at University College London. He has been Consultant Adult Psychotherapist at the Portman Clinic in London. His writings have appeared in the Financial Times, Vogue, The New Yorker, Granta and The Guardian.

His first book, The Examined Life, was published by Chatto and Windus (UK) in January 2013, and spent the first three months after publication in the top ten of the Sunday Times non-fiction bestseller list. It has been translated into over 25 languages. It was positively reviewed and appeared on many "year's best" lists. An abridged version of the book was broadcast on BBC Radio 4.

His second book, Love's Labor: How We Break and Make the Bonds of Love, was published in 2026.
