= Henry Edward Manning =

English Catholic cardinal (1808–1892)

His Eminence Henry Edward Manning
- Cardinal, Archbishop of Westminster
- 1883 portrait of Manning
- Church: Latin Church
- Province: Westminster
- Diocese: Westminster
- Appointed: 16 May 1865
- Term ended: 14 January 1892
- Predecessor: Nicholas Wiseman
- Successor: Herbert Vaughan
- Other post: Cardinal-Priest of Santi Andrea e Gregorio al Monte Celio
- Previous post: Archdeacon of Chichester 1840–1851 (Anglican)

Orders
- Ordination: 23 December 1833 (Anglican priest); 14 June 1851 (Catholic priest) by Nicholas Wiseman
- Consecration: 8 June 1865 by William Bernard Ullathorne
- Created cardinal: 15 March 1875 by Pope Pius IX
- Rank: Cardinal-Priest

Personal details
- Born: 15 July 1808 Totteridge, Hertfordshire, United Kingdom
- Died: 14 January 1892 (aged 83) London, England
- Buried: Westminster Cathedral
- Denomination: Catholicism (formerly Anglicanism)
- Parents: William and Mary (née Hunter) Manning
- Spouse: Caroline Sargent (m. 1833; died 1837)
- Education: Balliol College, Oxford
- Coat of arms

Henry Edward Manning (15 July 1808 – 14 January 1892) was an English prelate of the Catholic Church, and the second Archbishop of Westminster from 1865 until his death in 1892. He was ordained in the Church of England as a young man, but converted to Catholicism in the aftermath of the Gorham judgement.

== Early life ==
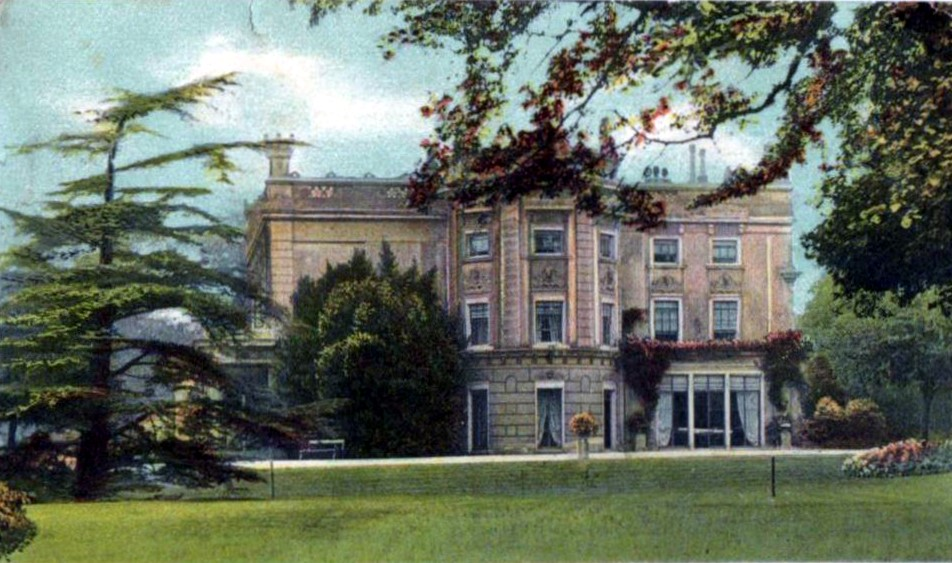
Copped Hall, Hertfordshire

Manning was born on 15 July 1808 at his grandfather's home, Copped Hall, Totteridge, Hertfordshire. He was the third and youngest son of William Manning, a prominent merchant and slave owner, who served as a director and (1812–1813) as a governor of the Bank of England and also sat in Parliament for 30 years, representing in the Tory interest Plympton Earle, Lymington, Evesham and Penryn consecutively. Manning's mother, Mary (died 1847), daughter of Henry Lannoy Hunter, of Beech Hill, and sister of Sir Claudius Stephen Hunter, 1st Baronet, came from a family of French Huguenot extraction.

Manning spent his boyhood mainly at Coombe Bank, Sundridge, Kent, where he had for companions Charles Wordsworth and Christopher Wordsworth, later bishops of St Andrews and Lincoln respectively. He attended Harrow School (1822–1827) during the headmastership of George Butler, but obtained no distinction beyond playing for two years in the cricket eleven. However, this proved to be no impediment to his academic career.

Manning matriculated at Balliol College, Oxford, in 1827, studying Classics, and soon made his mark as a debater at the Oxford Union, where William Ewart Gladstone succeeded him as president in 1830. At this date he had ambitions of a political career, but his father had sustained severe losses in business and, in these circumstances, having graduated with first-class honours in 1830, he obtained the year following, through the 1st Viscount Goderich, a post as a supernumerary clerk in the Colonial Office. Manning resigned from this position in 1832, his thoughts having turned towards a clerical career under Evangelical influences, including his friendship with Favell Lee Mortimer, which affected him deeply throughout life.

== Anglican cleric ==
Returning to Oxford in 1832, he gained election as a fellow of Merton College and received ordination as a deacon in the Church of England. In January 1833 he became curate to John Sargent, Rector of Lavington-with-Graffham, West Sussex. In May 1833, following Sargent's death, he succeeded him as rector due to the patronage of Sargent's mother.

Manning married Caroline, John Sargent's daughter, on 7 November 1833, in a ceremony performed by the bride's brother-in-law, the Revd Samuel Wilberforce, later Bishop of Oxford and Winchester. Manning's marriage did not last long: his young wife came of a consumptive family and died childless on 24 July 1837. When Manning died more than half a century later, it was found that despite his having by then been a celibate Catholic cleric for many decades, he still wore around his neck a chain with a locket containing Caroline's picture.

Though he never became an acknowledged disciple of John Henry Newman (later Cardinal Newman), the latter's influence meant that from this date Manning's theology assumed an increasingly High Church character and his printed sermon on the "Rule of Faith" publicly signalled his alliance with the Tractarians.

In 1838 he took a leading part in the church education movement, by which diocesan boards were established throughout the country; and he wrote an open letter to his bishop in criticism of the recent appointment of the ecclesiastical commission. In December of that year he paid his first visit to Rome and called on Nicholas Wiseman, the Rector of the English College, in company with Gladstone.

In January 1841 Philip Shuttleworth, Bishop of Chichester, appointed Manning as the Archdeacon of Chichester, and entering into the role, he began a personal visitation of each parish within his district, completing the task in 1843. In 1842 he published a treatise on The Unity of the Church and given his established reputation as an eloquent and earnest preacher, he was in the same year appointed select preacher by his university, thus being called upon to fill from time to time the pulpit which Newman, as vicar of St Mary's, was just relinquishing.

Four volumes of Manning's sermons appeared between the years 1842 and 1850 and these had reached the 7th, 4th, 3rd and 2nd editions respectively in 1850, but were not afterwards reprinted. In 1844 his portrait was painted by George Richmond, and the same year he published a volume of university sermons, omitting the one he had preached on the Gunpowder Plot. This sermon had annoyed Newman and his more advanced disciples, but it was proof that at that date Manning was loyal to the Church of England.

Newman's secession in 1845 placed Manning in a position of greater responsibility, as one of the High Church leaders, along with Edward Bouverie Pusey, John Keble and Marriott; but it was with Gladstone and James Robert Hope-Scott that he was at this time most closely associated.

== Conversion to Catholicism ==
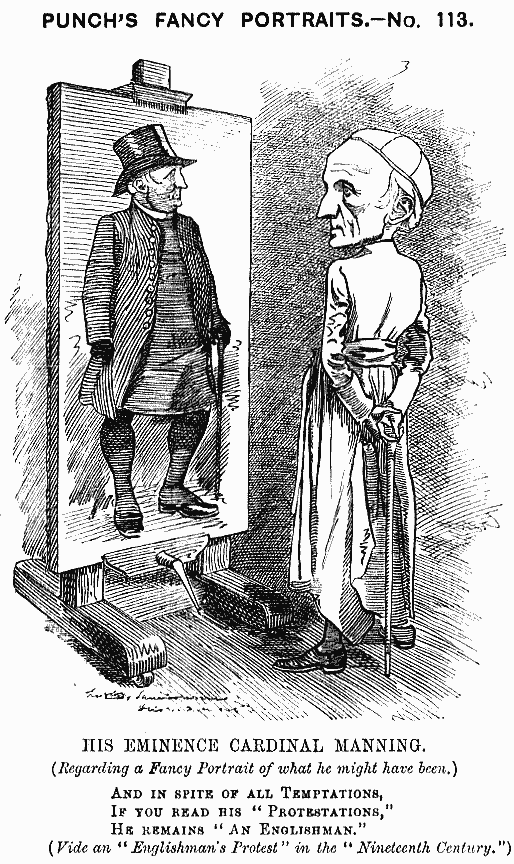
1882 caricature from Punch

Manning's belief in Anglicanism was shattered in 1850 when, in the so-called Gorham judgement, the Privy Council ordered the Church of England to institute an evangelical cleric who denied that the sacrament of baptism had an objective effect of baptismal regeneration. The denial of the objective effect of the sacraments was to Manning and many others a grave heresy, contradicting the clear tradition of the Christian Church from the Church Fathers on. That a civil and secular court had the power to force the Church of England to accept someone with such an unorthodox opinion proved to him that, far from being a divinely created institution, the Anglican Communion was a man-made creation and, even worse in his views, still completely controlled by Her Majesty's Government.

The following year, on 6 April 1851, Manning was received into the Catholic Church in England and then studied at the academia in Rome where he took his doctorate, and on 14 June 1851 was ordained a Catholic priest at the Jesuit Church of the Immaculate Conception, Farm Street. Given his great abilities and prior fame, he quickly rose to a position of influence. He served as provost of the cathedral chapter under Cardinal Wiseman.

In 1857, he established at Wiseman's direction the mission of St Mary of the Angels, Bayswater, to serve labourers building Paddington Station. There he founded, at Wiseman's request, the Congregation of the Oblates of St. Charles. This new community of secular priests was the joint work of Cardinal Wiseman and Manning, for both had independently conceived of the idea of a community of this kind, and Manning had studied the life and work of Charles Borromeo in his Anglican days at Lavington and had, moreover, visited the Oblates at Milan, in 1856, to satisfy himself that their rule could be adapted to the needs of Westminster. Manning became superior of the congregation.

== Archbishop ==
In 1865 he was appointed Archbishop of Westminster.

Among his accomplishments as head of the Catholic Church in England were the acquisition of the site for Westminster Cathedral, but his focus was on a greatly expanded system of Catholic education, including the establishment of the short-lived Catholic University College in Kensington.

In 1875 Manning was created Cardinal-Priest of Ss Andrea e Gregorio al Monte Celio. In 1878 he participated in the conclave that elected Pope Leo XIII.

Manning approved the founding of the Catholic Association Pilgrimage.

== Influence on social justice teaching ==
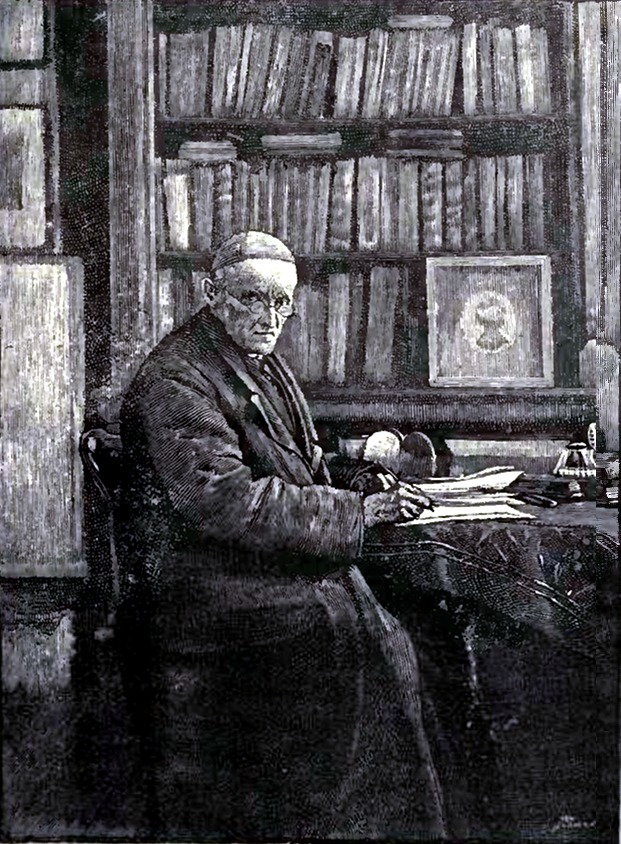
Manning in his 83rd year

Manning was very influential in setting the direction of the modern Catholic Church. His warm relations with Pope Pius IX and his ultramontane views gained him the trust of the Holy See, though "it was ordained that he should pass the evening of his days in England, and that he should outlive his intimacy at the Vatican and his influence on the general policy of the Church of Rome".

Manning used this goodwill to promote a modern Catholic view of social justice. Several scholars consider Manning to be a key contributor to the papal encyclical Rerum novarum issued by Pope Leo XIII, which marks the beginning of modern Catholic social justice teaching.

For part of 1870, he was in Rome attending the First Vatican Council. Manning was among the strongest supporters of the doctrine of papal infallibility, unlike Cardinal Newman who believed the doctrine but thought it might not be prudent to define it formally at the time.

Manning played a significant role in the conversion of other notable figures including Bessie Rayner Parkes, mother of famous British author Hilaire Belloc, upon whose thinking Manning had a profound influence. He did not, however, support enfranchising women. In 1871, at St. Mary Moorfield, he said he hoped English womanhood would "resist by a stern moral refusal, the immodesty which would thrust women from their private life of dignity and supremacy into the public conflicts of men."

In 1882, Manning gave a public speech in London, in which he condemned the antisemitic attacks and pogroms against the Jews in the Russian Empire. He additionally praised Jews for their moral excellence and charity towards others, calling them a good example for Catholics to follow.

In 1888, Manning was interviewed by social activist and journalist Virginia Crawford, a fellow English Catholic, for The Pall Mall Gazette, and was instrumental in settling the London dock strike of 1889 at the behest of Margaret Harkness.

== View of the priesthood ==
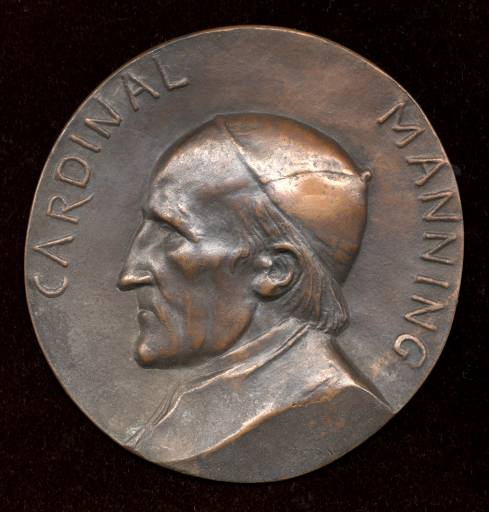
Manning by Alphonse Legros

In 1883, Manning published The Eternal Priesthood, his most influential work. In the book, Manning defended an elevated idea of the priesthood as, "in and of itself, an outstanding way to perfection, and even a 'state of perfection'". In comparison to his polemical writings, The Eternal Priesthood is "austere" and "glacial", arguing for a rigorous conception of the moral duties of the office. Manning additionally stressed the social function of the priest, who must be more to his community than a dispenser of the sacraments.

== Animal welfare ==
Manning was an anti-vivisectionist and founding member of the Victoria Street Society for the Protection of Animals from Vivisection. He was a vice-president of the Society. At the annual meeting of the Victoria Street Society in June 1881, he denounced vivisection as inhumane and of doubtful benefit to science. In 1887, Manning commented that vivisection is not "the way that the all-wise and all-good maker of us all has ordained for the discovery of the healing arts".

== Death and burial ==
On 14 January 1892, Manning died ate the age of aged 83, at which time his estate was probated at £3,527. He received a formal burial at St Mary's Catholic Cemetery in Kensal Green. Some years later, in 1907, his remains were transferred to the newly completed Westminster Cathedral.

== Works ==
- Rule of Faith (1839)
- Unity of the Church (1842)
- A charge delivered at the ordinary visitation of the archdeaconry of Chichester in July (1843)
- Sermons 4 vols. (1842–1850)
- The Present Crisis of the Holy See (1861)
- The Temporal Mission of the Holy Ghost or Reason and Revelation by Henry Edward Archbishop of Westminster. London: Longmans Green and Co. (1865)
- Rome and the Revolution (1867)
- Christ and Antichrist (1867)
- Petri Privilegium (1871)
- The Glories of the Sacred Heart (1876)
- The True Story of the Vatican Council (1877)
- The Eternal Priesthood (1883)
- The Little Flowers of Saint Francis (Manning's translation from the Italian published 1863)

== See also ==
- Catholic Church in England and Wales
- Oblates of St. Charles

== Notes ==
Church of England titles
Preceded by Charles Webber	Archdeacon of Chichester; 1840–1851	Succeeded by James Garbett
Catholic Church titles
Preceded by Nicholas Wiseman	Archbishop of Westminster; 1865–1892	Succeeded by Herbert Vaughan
Preceded by Angelo Quaglia	Cardinal Priest of Ss. Andrea e Gregorio al Monte; 1875–1892	Succeeded by Herbert Vaughan
