= Vicky Neale =

British mathematician and writer (1984–2023)

- Born: Victoria Ruth Neale; March 1984; Worcester, England, UK
- Died: 3 May 2023 (aged 39); Oxford, England, UK
- Citizenship: United Kingdom
- Education: University of Cambridge (BA); University of Cambridge (PhD)
- Scientific career
- Fields: Number theory
- Workplaces: University of Cambridge; University of Oxford
- Thesis: Bracket quadratics as asymptotic bases for the natural numbers (2011)
- Doctoral advisor: Ben Green
- Website: people.maths.ox.ac.uk/neale/

Victoria Ruth Neale (March 1984 – 3 May 2023) was a British mathematician and writer. She was Whitehead Lecturer at Oxford's Mathematical Institute and Supernumerary Fellow at Balliol College. Her research specialty was number theory. The author of the 2017 book Closing the Gap: The Quest to Understand Prime Numbers, she was interviewed on several BBC radio programs as a mathematics expert. In addition, she wrote for The Conversation and The Guardian. Her other educational and outreach activities included lecturing at the PROMYS Europe high-school program and helping to organize the European Girls' Mathematical Olympiad.

Neale was born in 1984. She obtained her PhD in 2011 from the University of Cambridge. Her thesis work, supervised by Ben Joseph Green, concerned Waring's problem. She then taught at Cambridge while being Director of Studies in mathematics at Murray Edwards College, before moving to Oxford in the summer of 2014.

Neale died on 3 May 2023, at the age of 39. She had been diagnosed with a rare type of cancer in 2021.
