= List of media and film people associated with Balliol College, Oxford =

This is a list of media and film people associated with Balliol College, Oxford.

== Newspaper editors ==
Image	Name	Join date	Publication	Comments	Refs
	Stephen Bush	2008	The Financial Times	political journalist, associate editor and columnist	
	Martin Kettle	1967	The Guardian	Assistant Editor and columnist Marxist, as were both parents	
	Sir Richard Lambert	1963	The Financial Times	Editor FT director-general of the CBI chancellor of the University of Warwick chairman of the board of the British Museum member, Monetary Policy Committee of the Bank of England	
	Andrew Knight	1958	The Economist Daily Telegraph	Director of News Corporation; Director of BSkyB; Chairman of J. Rothschild Capital Management	
	Geoffrey Cannon	1958	Radio Times Sunday Times assistant editor World food and nutrition policy	Rock Journalist "Dieting Makes you Fat" 1982 "The Food Scandal" 1984 "The Politics of Food" 1987 "Superbug" 1995 "Food, Nutrition and the Prevention of Cancer: a Global Perspective" WCRF 1997	
	Baron William Rees-Mogg	1945	The Times	member of the BBC's Board of Governors chairman of the Arts Council	
	David Astor	1931	DNG The Observer	Companion of Honour Supported left wing causes - Amnesty International and the African National Congress Buried alongside George Orwell	
	Henry Vincent Hodson	1925	The Sunday Times	Fellow of All Souls Director, Empire Division, Ministry of Information WW2 Reforms Commissioner, Government of India Head of Non-Munitions, at the Ministry of Production wrote leader advocating legalisation of homosexuality	

== Political journalists ==
Image	Name	Join date	Field of work	Comments	Refs
	Jonathan Sacerdoti	1998	broadcaster, journalist, and TV producer	campaigner against antisemitism	
	Gary Gibbon	1984	Channel 4	political editor of Channel 4 News	
	George Stephanopoulos	1984	White House communications director under Bill Clinton	Rhodes Scholar Co-anchor of Good Morning America Memoir "All Too Human: A Political Education" 1999	
	Robert Peston	1979	ITV Political editor	BBC then ITV	
	Seumas Milne	1976	Spin doctor	Political advisor to Jeremy Corbyn	
	E. J. Dionne	1973	op-ed columnist Washington Post	Rhodes Scholar Fellow, Brookings Institution	
	David Aaronovitch	1972	DNG columnist President, National Union of Students	Eurocommunist TV producer, radio presenter, Orwell Prize winner	
	Charles Krauthammer	1970	Psychiatrist; Director of psychiatric research under President Carter US Conservative columnist	Pulitzer Prize winner chess addict	
	Christopher Hitchens	1967	Atlantic Vanity Fair	new atheist articulate speaker on numerous TV shows criticising religion Wrote book and documentary criticising Mother Teresa	
	Peter Snow	1958	Current affairs TV presenter	General Election TV analyst	
	Hugo Young	1958	The Guardian	Harkness Fellow Inside Politics colummn	
	Peter Usborne	1958	Private Eye co-founder	founder Usborne publishers	

== Radio, television and film ==
Image	Name	Join date	Field of work	Productions	Refs
	Chadwick Boseman	1998	Summer school Superhero actor (US)	Black Panther	
	Charlotte Higgins	1990	Culture and arts	chief culture writer, The Guardian author on Classical history	
	Aidan Hartley	1984	Documentary maker	Unreported World, Dispatches for C4 Kenyan wildlife conservationist and cattle farmer "Wildlife" column on The Spectator	
	Vanessa Engle	1981	Documentary maker	Lefties	
	Michael Winterbottom	1979	Film Director	24 Hour Party People; In This World	
	Bill Heine	1967	Radio Oxford broadcaster	Refounded the Penultimate Picture Palace 1976. Commissioned the Headington Shark on his property.	
	John Schlesinger	1947	Film director	Midnight Cowboy (1969). Won Oscars for Best Director and Best Picture: Sunday Bloody Sunday (1971), and The Next Best Thing (1999)	
	Roger Mayne	1947	Photographer	Southam Street	
	Anthony Asquith	1921	Film Director	Son of prime minister The Winslow Boy (1948), The Browning Version (1951), Pygmalion (1938), French Without Tears (1940), The Way to the Stars (1945) and an adaptation of Oscar Wilde's The Importance of Being Earnest (1952)	
	Maurice Gorham	1919	Controller of BBC TV	Editor, Radio Times Director of Radio Éireann	
	Raymond Massey	1919	Hollywood actor	Seven Angry Men	

== Other ==
Image	Name	Graduation date	Known for	Comments	Refs
	Ghislaine Maxwell	1985	Socialite	British socialite, daughter of Robert Maxwell (owner of Pergamon press), arrested for trafficking charges related to Jeffrey Epstein. Was also a director of Oxford United	
