= Lionel Daiches =

Scottish QC and Liberal Party politician

Lionel Henry Daiches (8 March 1911 – 11 November 1999), was a Scottish QC and Liberal Party politician.

== Background ==
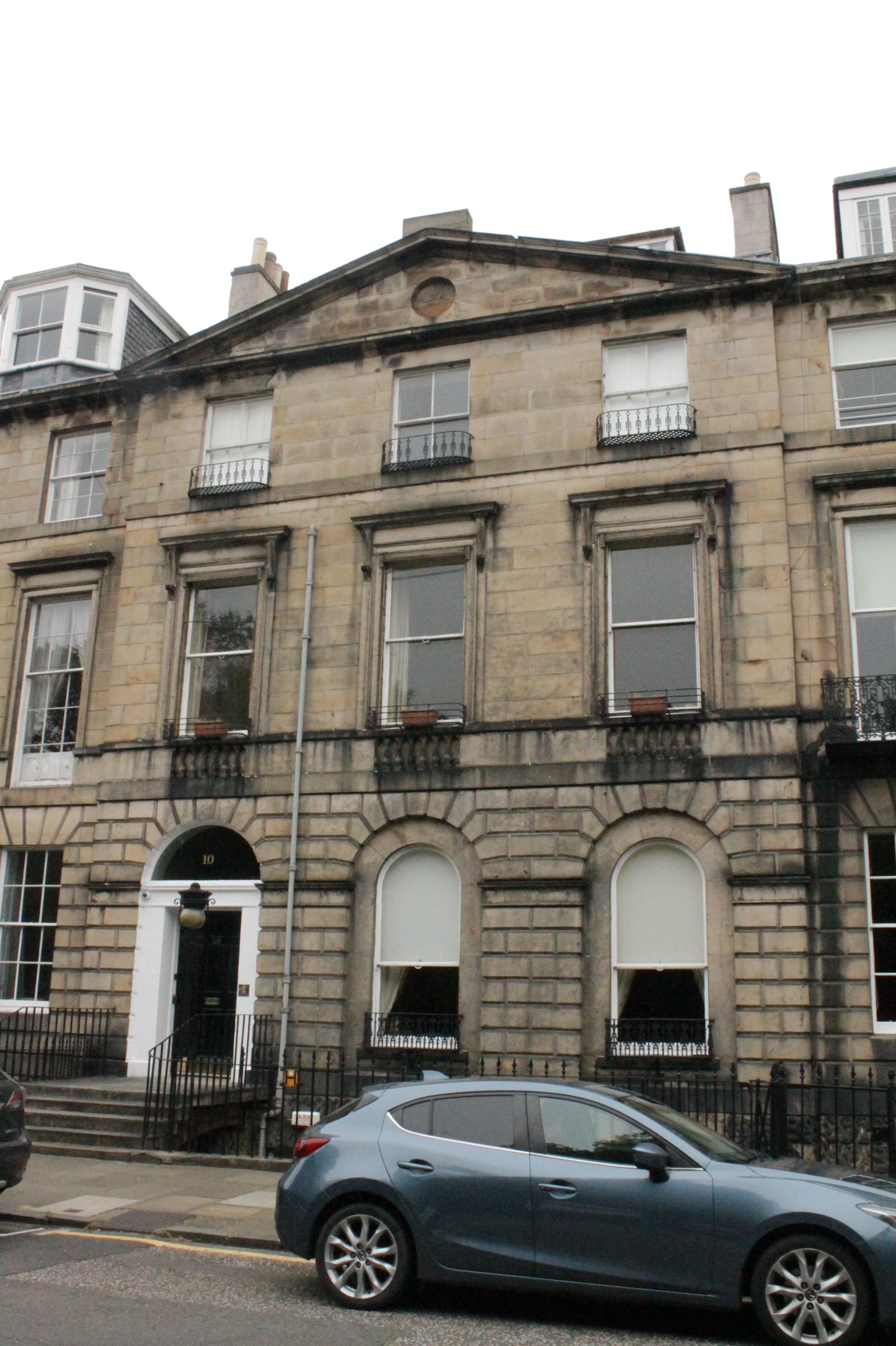
Daiches lived at 10 Heriot Row, Edinburgh

Daiches was born in 8 March 1911, the son of Dr. Salis Daiches, a Litvak-born rabbi to the Edinburgh Jewish congregation. He is of Lithuanian-Jewish origin. Daiches was educated at George Watson's College and Edinburgh University. In 1947 he married Dorothy Estelle Bernstein. They had two sons. His younger brother David Daiches was a noted writer. He also had two sisters, Sylvia and Beryl Daiches.

In later life he lived at 10 Heriot Row in central Edinburgh.

== Professional career ==
Daiches practised as a solicitor before being admitted a member of the Faculty of Advocates in 1946. He became a QC in 1956.

== Political career ==
Daiches wrote many articles arguing the identical nature of Bolshevism and Fascism. He was Liberal candidate for the Edinburgh South division at the 1950 General Election. It was not a promising seat and no Liberal had contested the division since 1929. In a difficult election year for the Liberals, he came third;

General Election 1950: Edinburgh South
| Party | Candidate | Votes | % | ±% |
|---|---|---|---|---|
| Unionist | William Darling | 23,081 | 65.0 | |
| Labour | William Paisley Earsman | 8,725 | 24.6 | |
| Liberal | Lionel Daiches | 3,699 | 10.4 | n/a |
| Majority | | 14,356 | 40.4 | |
| Turnout | | | 82.1 | |
| Unionist hold | | Swing | | |

He did not stand for parliament again.
