= List of economists associated with Balliol College, Oxford =

This is a list of economists, bankers, financiers and business people associated with Balliol College, Oxford.

== Economists, Bankers, Financiers and Business people ==
Image	Name	Join date	Field of work	Comments	References
	Ian Goldin	2006	globalisation	Fellow; Professor of Globalisation and Development founding Director of the Oxford Martin School	
	Kitty Ussher	1990	public policy	former MP Chief Economist, Institute of Directors Group Head of Policy Development at Barclays	
	Anusha Chari	1990	international economics	professor of economics, University of North Carolina at Chapel Hill	
	Stephanie Flanders	1986	public economics		
	Charles R. Conn	1983	innovation management	Rhodes Scholar; Partner, McKinseys; CEO Rhodes House, CEO Oxford Sciences Innovation, Chair Patagonia Inc published books on strategy problem solving	
	Jonathan Ostry	1981	international economics	Professor of Economics, Georgetown University son of economist Sylvia Ostry	
	Nicola Horlick	1979	investment management	Dubbed "superwoman" for balancing finance career with bringing up six children	
	Gavyn Davies	1972	investment banking	International Managing Director, Goldman SachsChair of the BBC	
	Martin Taylor	1971	business management	Director, Courtauld Textiles; CEO WH Smith; CEO Barclays Bank; Chair RTL Group; Bank of England Financial Policy Committee; Secretary General, Bilderberg Group	
	Deepak Nayyar	1967	development economics	Rhodes Scholar	
	Ben Fine	1966	Marxist economics	Professor of Economics, SOAS	
	Patrick Minford	1961	macroeconomics	Brexit advocate	
	Sir Adam Ridley	1961	financial markets	government economic advisor, director, Hambros Bank and of several insurance organisations	
	Andrew Graham	1960	political economics	Master of Balliol; Economic Advisor to the Prime Minister founded the Oxford Internet Institute son of Winston Graham of Poldark fame	
	Lester Thurow	1960	political economics	Head to Head: The Coming Economic Battle Among Japan, Europe and America	
	Stuart Holland	1960	European economics	Former MP Economic advisor to the EU and several European governments	
	Christopher Allsopp	1960	energy economics	Fellow, New College Member of the Monetary Policy Committee Co-founder Oxford Review of Economic Policy; Tutor to Rachel Reeves	
	John Crow	1958	central banking	Governor of the Bank of Canada	
	Peter Donaldson	1953	economics education	Author and broadcaster	
	Michael Posner	1950	international trade	UK economic advisor	
	James Robertson	1946	central banking	Director, Inter-Bank Research Organisation founder New Economics Forum	
	Grigor McClelland	1946	business management	retailer, first senior research fellow in Management Studies at Oxford; Founded Journal of Management Studies first Director, Manchester Business School; Chair, Joseph Rowntree Charitable Trust "changed the landscape of British business education" FT	
	Charles Kennedy	1940	endogenous growth theory	Professor, University of the West Indies; Director, Bank of Jamaica "one of the finest economic theorists of his generation" A P Thirlwell	
	Alexandre Kafka	1938	international economics	Executive Director, International Monetary Fund second cousin of Franz Kafka	
	Walter Rostow	1936	economic growth	Eastman Visiting Professor 1970; US National Security Advisor	
	Sir John Templeton	1934	mutual funds	Rhodes Scholar Templeton Growth Fund "arguably the greatest global stock picker of the century" Money magazine 1999	
	J. Irwin Miller	1931	industrialist ecumenist	established National Council of Churches	
	Sir Donald MacDougall	1931	public policy	Head of Government Economic Service	
	William Coolidge	1924	technology transfer	Philanthropist Vice President of the Museum of Fine Arts, Boston	
	Sir John Hicks	1922	general equilibrium theory	Nobel Prize for Economics	
	G. D. H. Cole	1908	co-operative movement	advocated participatory democracy sited at the workplace	
	Sir Otto Niemeyer	1902	central banking	Controller of Finance, Treasury - advised returning to the Gold Standard 1925; Director, Bank of England and also the Bank for International Settlements; Chair, London School Economics	
	Oswald Toynbee Falk	1898	stockbroker	Worked closely with John Maynard Keynes at the Treasury and the Paris Peace Conference. Broker to Keynes who described Falk as "one of 'nature's economists"	
	Sir William Beveridge	1897	social policy	founder, welfare state in the United Kingdom	
	William George Stewart Adams	1896	social science	created Oxford philosophy, politics and economics course	
	Sir William Ashley	1878	economic history	first Professor of Economic History in the English-speaking world: Harvard 1892	
	Francis Edgeworth	1867	utility theory	TCD,FBA founding editor The Economic Journal; Professor KCL; Drummond Professor of Political Economy, Oxford; President, Royal Statistical Society	
	Charles Stanton Devas	1867	political economy	Catholic apologist	
	Adam Smith	1740	political economy	a pioneer in the thinking of political economy and key figure of the Scottish Enlightenment, regarded as "The Father of Economics" or "The Father of Capitalism" The Wealth of Nations	
