= The Penguin Companion to Literature =

The Penguin Companion to Literature is a reference work published in four volumes by Penguin Books.

Volume 1 was edited by David Daiches and deals with British and Commonwealth literature. It has been called the most useful recent work of its kind. Volume 2, published in 1969, was edited by Anthony Thorlby and deals with the literature of Continental Europe since the fifth century AD. Volume 3 deals with the literature of the United States and Latin America. Volume 4, edited by D R Dudley and D M Lang deals with Classical, Byzantine, Oriental and African literature.

The Penguin Companion to World Literature was published by McGraw-Hill. The volumes were titled The Penguin Companion to English Literature, The Penguin Companion to European Literature, The Penguin Companion to American Literature, and The Penguin Companion to Classical, Oriental and African Literature.
