= The Examined Life (Grosz book) =

2013 book by Stephen Grosz

- First edition
- Author: Stephen Grosz
- Language: English
- Subject: Psychology
- Published: 2013 (Chatto & Windus)
- Publication place: United Kingdom
- Media type: Print
- Pages: 240
- ISBN: 978-0701185350

The Examined Life is a 2013 collection of essays by the practising psychoanalyst Stephen Grosz, which is an attempt to "distil over 50,000 hours of conversation into pure psychological insight, without the jargon." The book was serialised as Book of the Week on BBC Radio 4 in January 2012, and spent 10 weeks on the Sunday Times non-fiction bestseller list. The Examined Life was published in the United States by W.W. Norton and in Canada by Random House Canada in May 2013. It has been translated into over 25 languages.

In The New York Times, Michiko Kakutani praised the book as "an insightful and beautifully written… a series of slim, piercing chapters that read like a combination of Chekhov and Oliver Sacks." An abridged version of the book was broadcast on BBC Radio 4. The Examined Life was long-listed for the 2013 Guardian First Book Award. The Examined Life was chosen as one of 2013's Books of the Year in: The New York Times (Michiko Kakutani), Sunday Times (James McConnachie), Observer (Lisa Appignanesi), Salon (Emma Brockes), Mail on Sunday (Craig Brown), Observer (Lucy Lethbridge), The British Psychological Society.
