= David Daiches =

Scottish literary historian, literary critic, scholar and writer

- Born: 2 September 1912; Sunderland, England
- Died: 15 July 2005 (aged 92); Edinburgh, Scotland
- Occupations: Literary critic, scholar,
- Writing career
- Period: 1935–1994
- Subjects: English and Scottish literature and culture

David Daiches CBE (2 September 1912 – 15 July 2005) was a Scottish literary historian and literary critic, scholar and writer. He wrote extensively on English literature, Scottish literature and Scottish culture.

== Early life ==
He was born in Sunderland, to Jewish-Lithuanian émigrés —the subject of his 1956 memoir, Two Worlds: An Edinburgh Jewish Childhood. He moved to Edinburgh while still a young child, about the end of the First World War, where his father Reverend Dr. Salis Daiches was an Orthodox rabbi and founder of the city's branch of B'nai Brith.

He studied at George Watson's College and won a scholarship to the University of Edinburgh where he won the Elliot prize. He went to Oxford where he became the Elton exhibitioner, and was elected Fellow of Balliol College in 1936.

Daiches is the father of Jenni Calder, also a Scottish literary historian. His brother was the prominent Edinburgh Lionel Henry Daiches QC. Although Lionel retained the older, traditional pronunciation of their surname as 'dyke-iz' /ˈdaɪ χ (or k) ɪz/, David returned from the US with the Americanized 'day-ches', /ˈdeɪ tʃɪz/. He also had a sister, Sylvia Daiches.

== Career ==
During the Second World War, he worked for the British Embassy in Washington, DC, producing pamphlets for the British Information Services and drafting (and delivering) speeches on British institutions and foreign policy.

Daiches' first published work was The Place of Meaning in Poetry, published in 1935. He was a prolific writer, producing works on English literature, Scottish literature, literary history and criticism as well as the broader role of literature in society and culture. His The Novel and the Modern World (1939) was well received, and his expertise on the modern period led to his co-editing The Norton Anthology of English Literature (1962). He edited the Studies in English Literature series. His other works include:

- the two-volume A Critical History of English Literature,
- the Penguin Companion to Literature – Britain and the Commonwealth (editor, 1971),
- biographical and critical works on Virginia Woolf, Robert Louis Stevenson, Robert Burns, D. H. Lawrence, John Milton, and Sir Walter Scott,
- two autobiographical volumes,
- books on Scotch whisky, the King James Bible, and the cities of Edinburgh and Glasgow,
- a biography of Bonnie Prince Charlie, and
- a volume of poetry.

Starting at the University of Edinburgh, he had a long and influential career teaching in the UK, the US and Canada. He taught or held visiting posts at Balliol College, the University of Chicago, Cornell University, Jesus College, Cambridge, Indiana University, the University of Minnesota, McMaster University in Canada, Wesleyan University in Connecticut, and the University of California; besides setting up the English Department at the newly founded University of Sussex. From 1979 to 1984 he was President of the Association for Scottish Literary Studies and from 1980 to 1986 he was Director of the Institute for Advanced Studies in the Humanities at Edinburgh University. Daiches chaired the panel of judges for the Booker Prize in 1980 and was president of the Saltire Society from 1982 to 1986. He was appointed CBE in the 1991 Birthday Honours.

He received the Quantrell Award.

== List of published works ==
- The Place of Meaning in Poetry (1935)
- New Literary Values; Studies in Modern Literature (1936)
- Literature and Society (1938)
- Poetry and the Modern World: A Study of Poetry in England Between 1900 and 1939 (1940)
- Virginia Woolf (1942)
- Robert Louis Stevenson (1947)
- A Study of Literature (For Readers and Critics) (1948)
- Robert Burns (1950)
- Stevenson and the Art of Fiction (1951)
- A Century of the Essay: British and American (1951)
- Willa Cather – A Critical Introduction (1951)
- Two Worlds : An Edinburgh Jewish Childhood (1956) (memoirs)
- Literary Essays (1956)
- Critical Approaches to Literature (1956)
- The Present Age in British Literature (After 1920) (1958)
- Two Studies: The Poetry of Dylan Thomas, Walt Whitman: Impressionist Prophet (1958)
- Robert Louis Stevenson – a Laurel Reader (1959) editor
- A Critical History of English Literature (1960) two volumes
- The Novel and the Modern World (1960)
- White Man in the Tropics: Two Moral Tales (1962)
- D. H. Lawrence (1963)
- George Eliot: Middlemarch (1963)
- English Literature (1964)
- Milton (1964)
- The Idea of a New University. An Experiment in Sussex (1964) editor
- The Paradox of Scottish Culture: The Eighteenth Century Experience (1964)
- More Literary Essays (1968)
- The King James Version of the English Bible (1968)
- Scotch Whisky: Its Past and Present (1969)
- Some Late Victorian Attitudes (1969) Ewing Lectures
- A Third World (1971) (memoirs)
- Penguin Companion to Literature – Britain and the Commonwealth (1971) editor
- Sir Walter Scott and His World (1971)
- Robert Burns and His World (1972)
- Literature and Western Civilization (1972–76) editor with Anthony Thorlby, six volumes
- Robert Louis Stevenson and His World (1973)
- Bonnie Prince Charlie: The Life and Times of Charles Edward Stuart (1973)
- Moses: Man in the Wilderness (1975) Moses: The Man and the Vision in the US
- Was: A Pastime from Time Past (1975)
- James Boswell and His World (1976)
- Shakespeare: Julius Caesar (1976)
- Glasgow (1977)
- Scotland and the Union (1977)
- Edinburgh (1978)
- The Butterfly and the Cross (1978)
- The Selected Poems of Robert Burns (1979)
- Andrew Fletcher of Saltoun. Selected Political Writings and Speeches (1979) editor
- Literary Landscapes of the British Isles. A Narrative Atlas (1979) with John Flower
- A Companion to Scottish Culture (1981)
- The Avenel Companion to English and American Literature (1981) editor
- Literature and Gentility in Scotland (1982)
- God and the Poets (1984) Gifford Lectures (1983)
- A Hotbed of Genius: The Scottish Enlightenment, 1730–1790 (1986) editor with Jean Jones and Peter Jones
- Let's Collect Scotch Whisky (Jarrold Collectors Series) (1988)
- A Wee Dram: Drinking Scenes from Scottish Literature (1990)
- A Weekly Scotsman and Other Poems (1994)
