= Rosalind Thomas =

Rosalind Thomas FBA is a Fellow and Tutor in Classics at Balliol College, Oxford University and professor of Ancient Greek history. She focuses on ancient literacy, oral tradition and performance culture as well as Greek law and society, Greek historiography, Greek relations with the Persians, and the Greek polis. She was elected as a Fellow of the British Academy in 2020.

== Publications ==
Thomas has authored two books on the subject of literacy in Ancient Greece, and two on Greek historiography:

- Oral Tradition and Written Record in Classical Athens, Cambridge University Press (1989); called "rich and invigorating" by the London Review of Books
- Literacy and Orality in Ancient Greece, Cambridge University Press (1992)
- Herodotus in Context: Ethnography, Science and the Art of Persuasion, Cambridge University Press (2000)
- Polis Histories, Collective Memories and the Greek World, Cambridge University Press (2019).

Aside from these, she has published many chapters in edited volumes, including but not limited to Cambridge Companion to Greek Law (ed. M. Gagarin & D. Cohen, 2005), Cambridge Companion to Herodotus (ed. J. Marincola and C. Dewald, 2006) and Fourth Century Greek Historiography: A Reevaluation (ed. N. Luraghi and R. Vattuone, 2012).

She was a Program in the Ancient World Fellow at Princeton University in 2013.
