= List of Scottish Jews =

This is a list of Scottish people of some Jewish background, or Jewish people with a Scottish background or connection.

See History of the Jews in Scotland for more information.

== Academic figures and scientists ==
- Ruth Adler, child welfare campaigner and human rights campaigner
- Charlotte Auerbach, geneticist
- Philip Cohen, FRS FRSE professor of biochemistry, University of Dundee, winner of the Royal Medal and other awards
- David Daiches, writer and literary critic, professor of English, University of Sussex; father of Jenni Calder
- Shamai Davidson psychotherapist and Holocaust scholar
- Jack D. Dunitz, chemist
- Alfred Edersheim, Bible scholar
- Charles Frank, maker of scientific instruments
- Ralph Glasser, psychologist, economist, author of The Gorbals Trilogy
- Professor Sir Abraham Goldberg, Regius Professor of the Practice of Medicine, University of Glasgow
- Philip Hobsbaum, academic and literary critic at Glasgow University; an influence on many Scottish writers as diverse as Aonghas MacNeacail and Jeff Torrington
- Hans Kosterlitz, professor of pharmacology, University of Aberdeen
- Lesley Lokko, architect, academic, and novelist
- Stefan Reif, emeritus professor of medieval Hebrew studies, University of Cambridge and director of the Taylor-Schechter Genizah Research Unit
- John Michael Robson, geneticist, University of Edinburgh
- George Sassoon, electronics engineer, translator and author; son of Siegfried Sassoon, buried on Mull, where he spent much of his childhood
- Leonard Schapiro, historian
- Avivah Gottlieb Zornberg, contemporary Torah scholar and author

== Visual and performing arts, literature and music ==
- Ronni Ancona, actor, comedian and impressionist
- Chaim Bermant, author
- Arnold Brown, comedian
- Jenni Calder, literary figure and daughter of David Daiches
- Ivor Cutler, poet, songwriter and humourist
- Hannah Frank, sculptor, studied under Benno Schotz
- Muriel Gray, author, The Tube presenter
- Howie B, DJ, musician and producer
- Jeremy Isaacs, broadcaster
- A C Jacobs, poet
- Bernat Klein, textile artist
- David Knopfler, member of Dire Straits
- Mark Knopfler, co-founder (with brother David), lead vocalist, and lead guitarist for the band Dire Straits
- Peter Kravitz, literary critic, editor of the compilation Contemporary Scottish Fiction
- Daniel Lobell, stand-up comedian and podcaster
- Macdonald brothers, grandsons of the Hungarian-born English filmmaker Emeric Pressburger
  - Andrew Macdonald, producer, Trainspotting
  - Kevin Macdonald, director, Touching the Void
- Miriam Margolyes, actor
- Isi Metzstein, modernist architect
- Saul Metzstein, filmmaker, director of Late Night Shopping
- Rebecca Pidgeon, actor, singer and songwriter, married to playwright David Mamet
- Jack Ronder, author, dramatist, playwright
- Hugo Rifkind, journalist
- Jerry Sadowitz, comedian
- Benno Schotz, sculptor
- Shulman brothers (Simon Dupree and the Big Sound; Gentle Giant), rock musicians
  - Derek Shulman, multi-instrumentalist and songwriter
  - Phil Shulman, multi-instrumentalist and songwriter
  - Ray Shulman, multi-instrumentalist and songwriter
- J. David Simons, author
- Edith Simon, artist
- Robin Spark, artist
- Scottie Wilson, artist and designer, born in Glasgow
- Eric Woolfson, musician and composer, founding member of The Alan Parsons Project

== Politicians ==
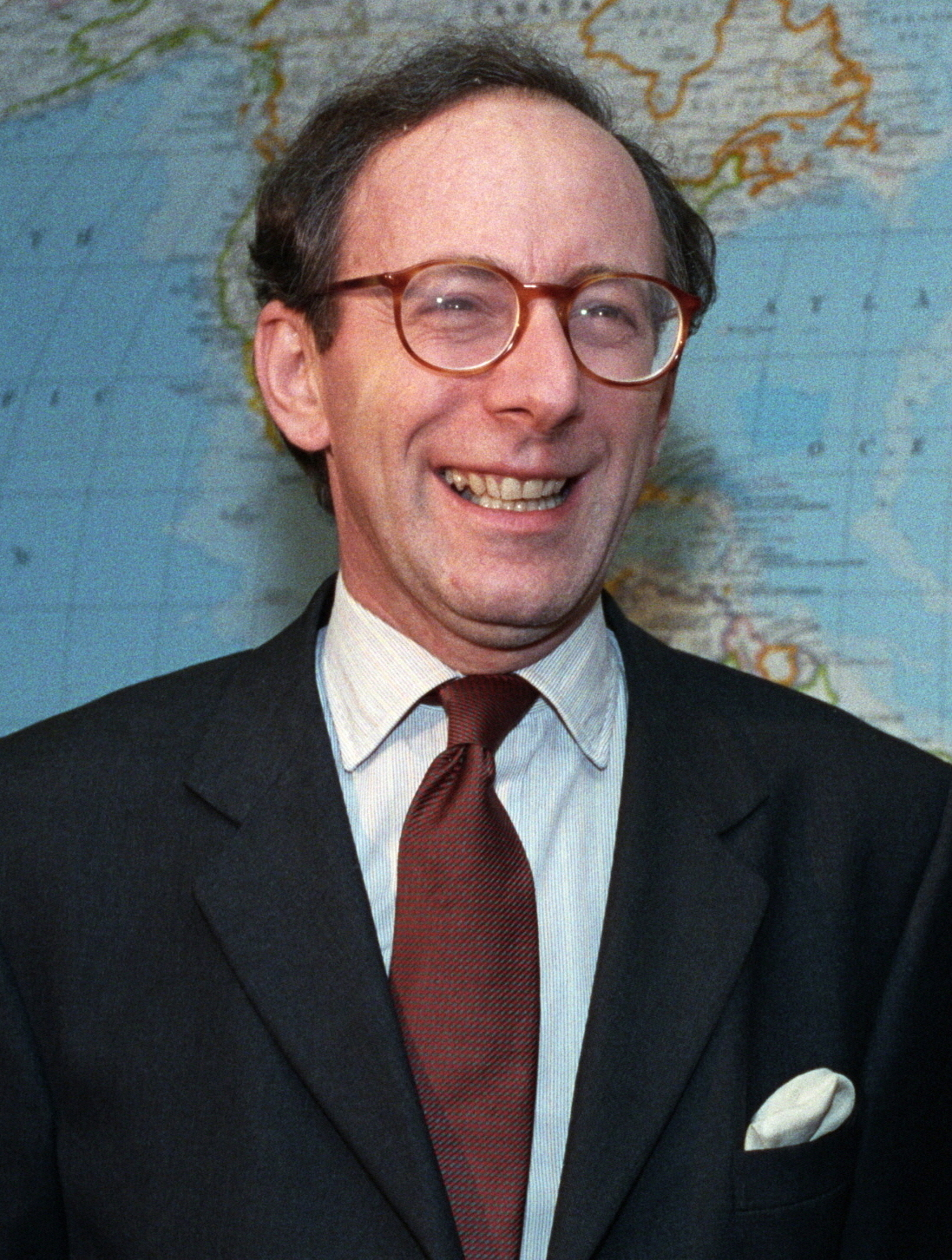
Malcolm Rifkind

- Myer Galpern, Labour MP
- Harry Primrose, 6th Earl of Rosebery, Secretary of State for Scotland, elder son of Hannah de Rothschild
- Neil Primrose, MP and soldier, younger son of Hannah de Rothschild
- Malcolm Rifkind, Conservative MP
- Manny Shinwell, Labour MP

== Athletes ==
- Noam Dar, professional wrestler
- Gary Jacobs, Scottish, British, Commonwealth, and European (EBU) boxing champion welterweight

== Business and the professions ==
- Philip Caplan, Lord Caplan, first Jewish Court of Session judge
- Hazel Cosgrove, Lady Cosgrove, first female Court of Session judge
- Sir Monty Finniston, industrialist, chairman of British Steel Corporation
- Esta Henry, art and antiques dealer in the 20th century
- B. Marcus Priteca, architect
- Sir Isaac Wolfson, businessman and philanthropist
- Harry Woolf, Baron Woolf, barrister and judge

== Religious and communal leaders ==
- Rabbi Salis Daiches, father of David Daiches
- Rabbi Cyril Harris, Chief Rabbi of South Africa
- Rabbi Shmuel Yitzchak Hillman
- Rabbi Yaakov Benzion Mendelson
- Rabbi Nancy Morris, first female rabbi in Scotland
- Rabbi Louis Isaac Rabinowitz
- Rabbi Naftoli Shapiro

== People of both Scottish and Jewish heritage ==
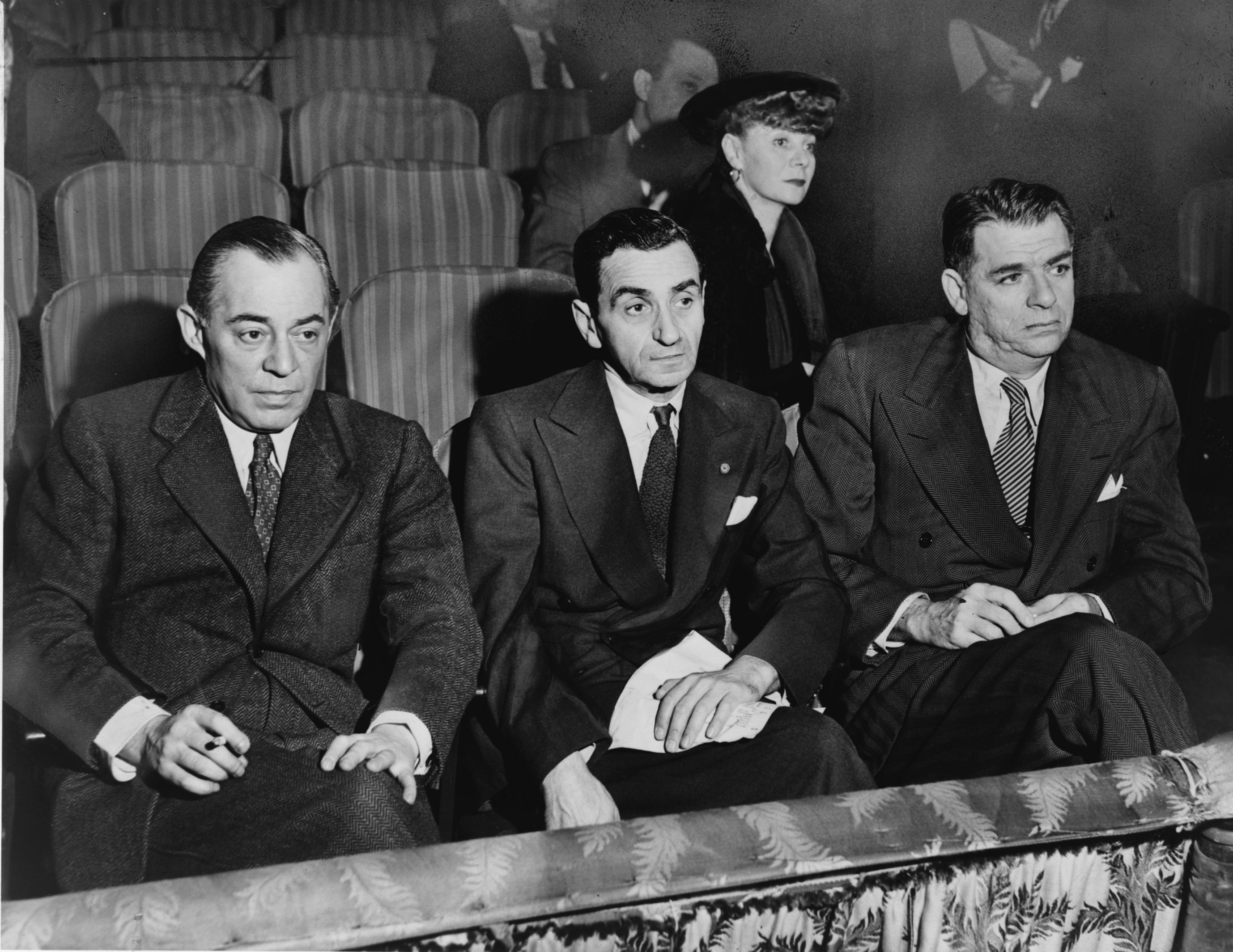
Oscar Hammerstein II, right

- Simon Cowell, presenter of The X Factor (Jewish father, Scottish mother)
- David Duchovny, American actor, X-Files (Jewish father, Scottish mother)
- Isla Fisher, Australian actress, born to Scottish parents, converted to Judaism upon marriage to Sacha Baron Cohen;
- Oscar Hammerstein II, American lyricist, librettist, and theatrical producer (Jewish father, Scottish mother)
- Phil Ochs, American singer-songwriter and activist (Scottish-Jewish mother, Polish-Jewish father)
- Norman Swan, Australian paediatrician known for his work as a science and medical broadcaster on ABC, born in Glasgow
- Zarif, singer (Scottish father, Iranian-Jewish mother)
- Dame Muriel Spark (Scottish-Jewish father, mother also of Jewish heritage)
- Eugene Levy, actor known for his roles in the American Pie series and Schitt's Creek.

== See also ==
- History of the Jews in Scotland
