= History of the Jews in Scotland =

Scottish Jews Iùdhaich na h-Alba יהודים סקוטיים שאָטישע ייִדן
Total population
- 5,847 – 0.1% (2022 Census)

Regions with significant populations
- East Renfrewshire: 1,511 – 1.6%
- City of Edinburgh: 1,270 – 0.25%
- Glasgow City: 973 – 0.16%

Languages
- Scottish English, Scots, Scottish Gaelic, Hebrew, Yiddish

Religion
- Judaism

Recent Population
Year	Pop.	±%
2001	6,448	—
2011	5,887	−8.7%
2022	5,847	−0.7%
Religious Affiliation was not recorded in the census prior to 2001. Source: National Records of Scotland

The location of Scotland (dark green) in the United Kingdom in Europe

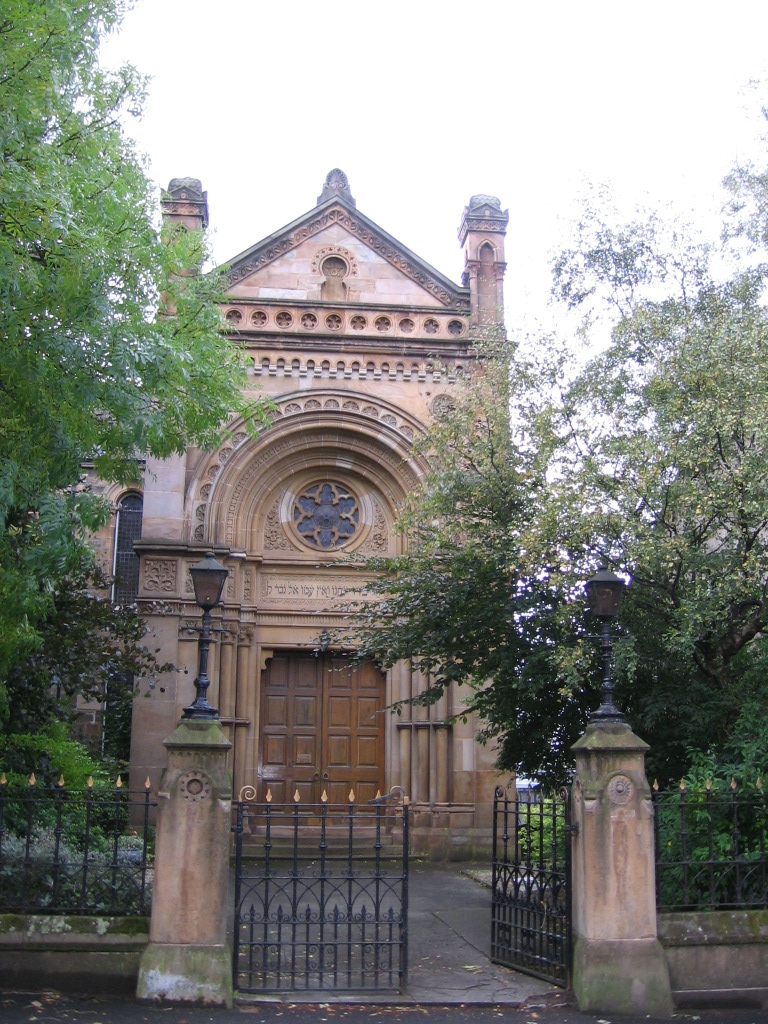
Garnethill Synagogue in Glasgow

The history of the Jews in Scotland goes back to at least the 17th century. It is not known when Jews first arrived in Scotland, with the earliest concrete historical references to a Jewish presence in Scotland being from the late 17th century. Most Scottish Jews today are of Ashkenazi background who mainly settled in Edinburgh, then in Glasgow in the mid-19th century. In 2013 the Edinburgh Jewish Studies Network curated an online exhibition based on archival holdings and maps in the National Library of Scotland exploring the influence of the community on the city.

According to the 2011 census, 5,887 Jews lived in Scotland; a decline of 8.7% from the 2001 census. The total population of Scotland at the time was 5,313,600, making Scottish Jews 0.1% of the population.

== Middle Ages to union with England ==
There is scant evidence of a Jewish presence in medieval Scotland. In 1180, the Bishop of Glasgow forbade churchmen to "ledge their benefices for money borrowed from Jews". This was around the time of anti-Jewish riots in England and so it is possible that Jews may have arrived in Scotland as refugees, or it may refer to Jews domiciled in England from whom Scots were borrowing money.

In 1320, the Declaration of Arbroath made mention of Jews, stating that "there is neither weighing nor distinction of Jew and Greek, Scotsman or Englishman" in the eyes of God.

In the Middle Ages, much of Scotland's trade was with Continental Europe, with wool of the Borders abbeys being the country's main export to the Low Countries. Scottish merchants from Aberdeen and Dundee had close trading links to Baltic Sea ports in Poland and Lithuania. It is possible, therefore, that Jews may have come to Scotland to do business with their Scottish counterparts, but no direct evidence of that exists.

The late-18th-century author Henry Mackenzie speculated that the high incidence of biblical place names around the village of Morningside near Edinburgh might indicate that Jews had settled in the area during the Middle Ages. This belief has, however, been shown to be incorrect, with the names originating instead from the presence of a local farm named "Egypt" mentioned in historical documents from the 16th century and believed to indicate a Romani presence.

== 17th–19th centuries ==
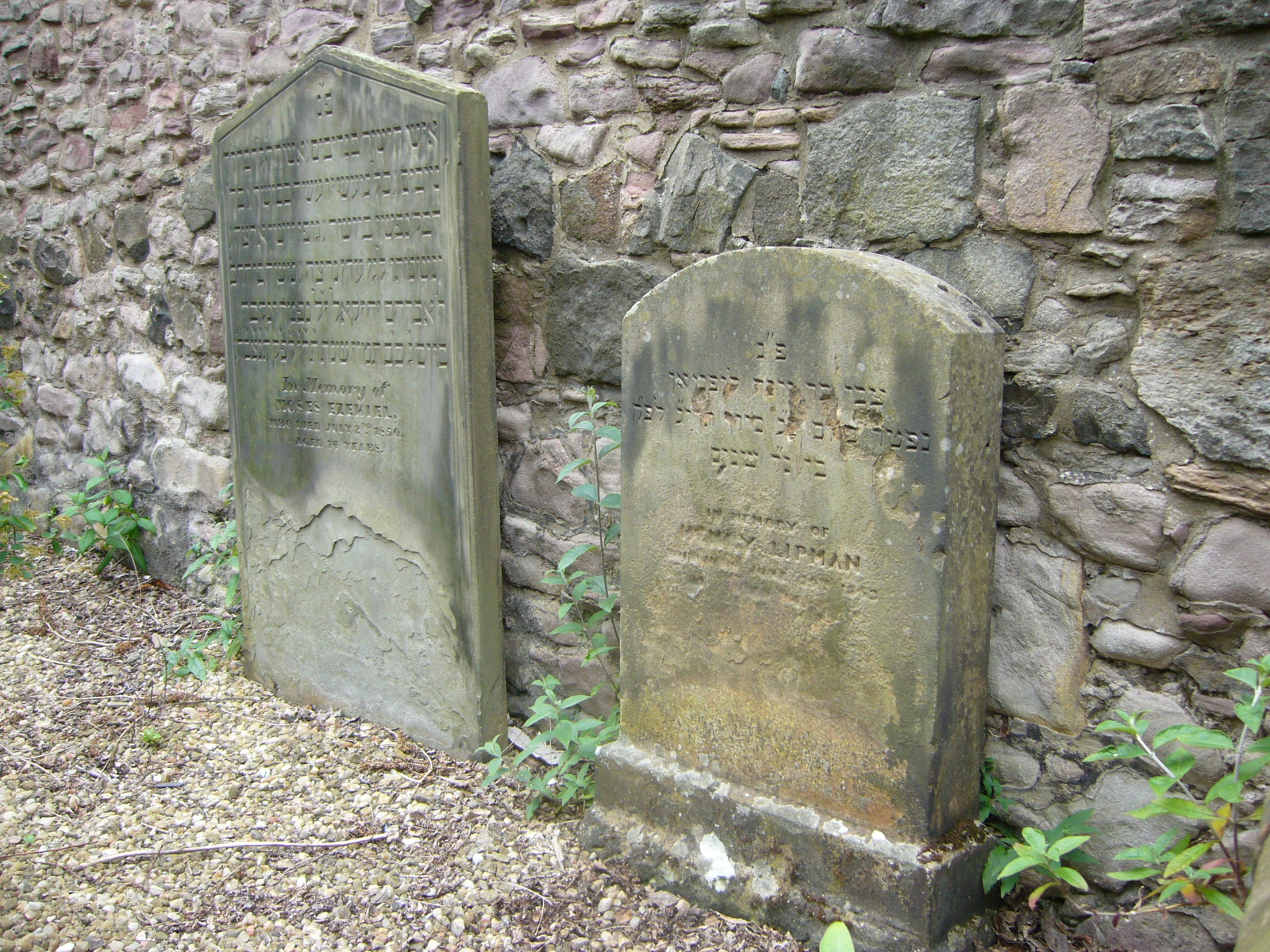
The old Jewish burial ground in Edinburgh dates from 1813

Paulus Scialitti Rabin (fl. 1655) was a Hebrew and Oriental Languages teacher who was granted permission to reside in Edinburgh and practice his trade on account of converting into Christianity. Rabin immigrated from England when Scotland was forcibly annexed to Oliver Cromwell's "Commonwealth", which granted freedom to practice Judaism. Multiple accounts of conversion of early Jewish immigrants in Scotland, including Rabin, Alexander Amadeus and, temporarily, Julius Conradus Otto, demonstrate that adopting Christian faith was a required tool for social mobility. Jewish teachers and lecturers were some of the first to be recognised by Scottish authorities. Rabin resided in Scotland before the first recorded Scottish Jew, David Brown. On account of his conversion, Rabin does not hold the status.

The first recorded Jew in Edinburgh was one David Brown who made a successful application to reside and trade in the city in 1691.

Most Jewish immigration appears to have occurred post-industrialisation, and post-1707. Oliver Cromwell readmitted Jews to the Commonwealth of England in 1656, and would have had influence over whether they could reside north of the border. Scotland was under the jurisdiction of the Jewish Naturalisation Act, enacted in 1753, but repealed the next year. It has been theorised that some Jews who arrived in Scotland promptly assimilated, with some converting to Christianity.

Unlike their English contemporaries, Scottish university students were not required to take a religious oath. Joseph Hart Myers, born in New York, was the first Jewish student to study medicine in Scotland; he graduated from the University of Edinburgh in 1779. The first graduate from the University of Glasgow who was openly known to be Jewish was Levi Myers, in 1787. In 1795, Herman Lyon, a dentist and chiropodist, bought a burial plot in Edinburgh. Originally from Mogendorf, Germany he left there around 1764 and spent some time in Holland before arriving in London. He moved to Scotland in 1788. The presence of the plot on Calton Hill is no longer obvious today, but it is marked on the Ordnance Survey map of 1852 as "Jew's Burial vault".

The first Jewish congregation in Edinburgh was founded in 1817, when the Edinburgh community consisted of 20 families. The first congregation in Glasgow was founded in 1821. Much of the first influx of Jews to Scotland were Dutch and German merchants attracted to the commercial economies of Scottish cities.

Isaac Cohen, a hatter resident in Glasgow, was admitted a burgess of the city on 22 September 1812. The first interment in the Glasgow Necropolis was that of Joseph Levi, a quill merchant and cholera victim who was buried there on 12 September 1832. This occurred in the year before the formal opening of the burial ground, a part of it having been sold to the Jewish community beforehand for one hundred guineas. Glasgow-born Asher Asher (1837–1889) was the first Scottish Jew to enter the medical profession. He was the author of The Jewish Rite of Circumcision (1873).

In 1878, Jewish Hannah de Rothschild (1851–1890), the richest woman in Britain at the time, married Scottish aristocrat Archibald Primrose, 5th Earl of Rosebery, despite strong antisemitic sentiments in court and the aristocracy. They had four children. Their son, Harry, became Secretary of State for Scotland in 1945 during Winston Churchill's post-war caretaker government.

To avoid persecution and pogroms in the Russian Empire in the 1880s, many Jews settled in the larger cities of Britain, including Scotland, most notably in Glasgow (especially the poorer part of the city, the Gorbals, alongside Irish and Italian immigrants). Smaller numbers settled in Edinburgh and even smaller groups in Dundee (first synagogue founded in 1878 and cemetery acquired in 1888) and Aberdeen (synagogue founded 1893). Small communities also existed for a time in Ayr, Dunfermline, Falkirk, Greenock, and Inverness. Russian Jews tended to come from the lands in the west of the empire known as the Pale of Settlement, in particular Lithuania and Poland, many using Scotland as a stopping post en route to North America. This explains why Glasgow was their favoured location. However, those who were not able to earn enough to afford the transatlantic voyage ended up settling in the city. In 1897, after the influx, the Jewish population of Glasgow was 6,500. The writer Jack Ronder depicted his own family's experience in the book and TV series The Lost Tribe.

This second influx of Jews was notably larger than the first, and came from Eastern Europe as opposed to Western European countries like Germany and the Netherlands. This led to the informal distinction between the Westjuden, who tended to be middle-class and assimilated into Scottish society, and the much bigger Ostjuden community, consisting of poor Yiddish-speakers who fled pogroms in Eastern Europe. The Westjuden had settled in more affluent areas such as Garnethill in Glasgow where Garnethill Synagogue was built between 1879 and 1881 in Victorian Romanesque style. It remains the oldest active synagogue in Scotland and now houses the Scottish Jewish Archives Centre and Scottish Jewish Heritage Centre. The Ostjuden in contrast mostly settled in slums in the Gorbals. This led to the building in 1901 of the South Portland Street Synagogue, also known at various times as the South Side Synagogue, the Great Synagogue and the Great Central Synagogue, regarded for many years as the religious centre of the Jewish community until its closure and demolition in 1974.

== 20th and 21st centuries ==
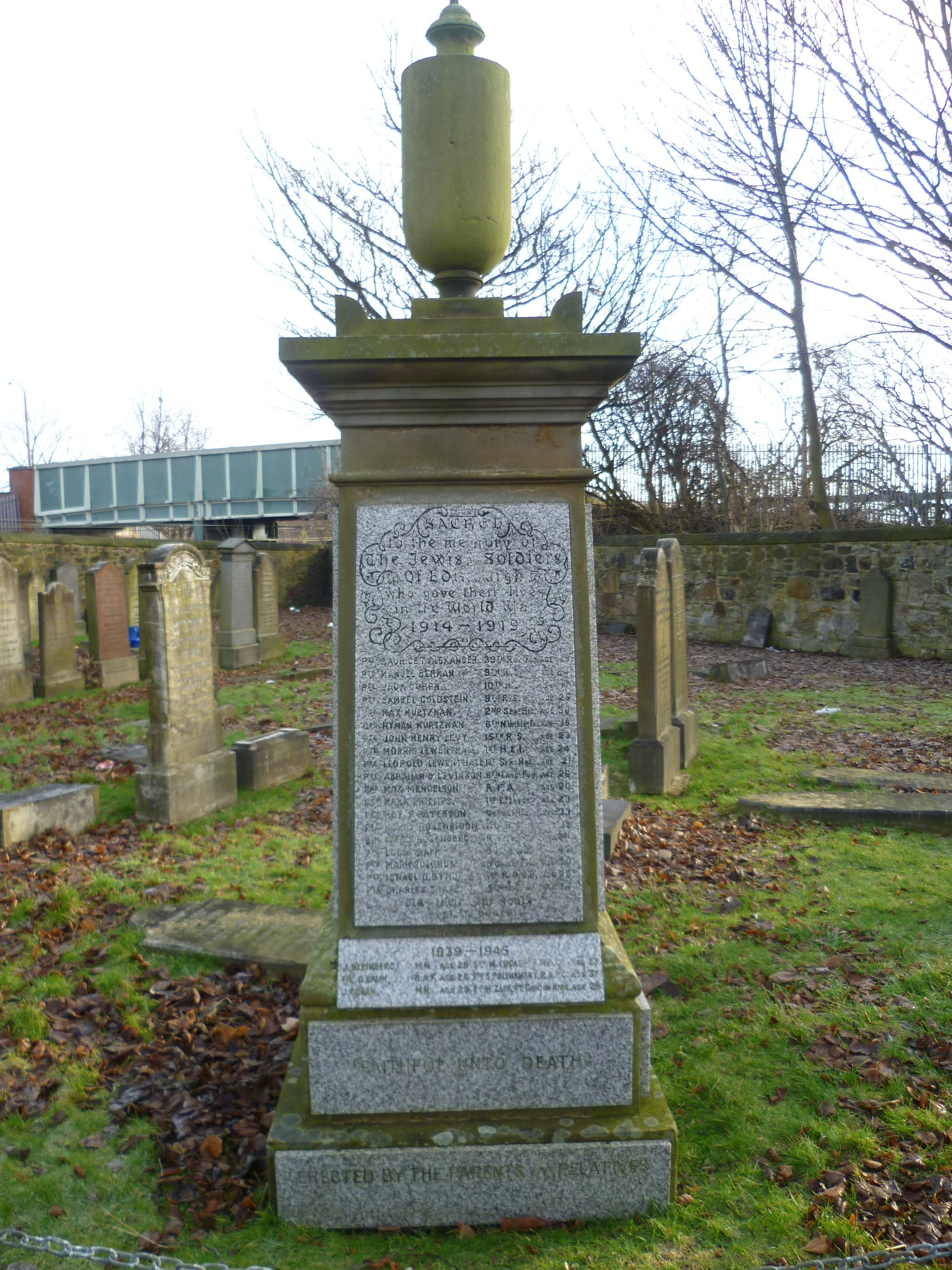
Memorial to Edinburgh's Jews who died fighting in the world wars

Immigration continued into the 20th century, with over 9,000 Jews in 1901 and around 12,000 in 1911. Jewish life in the Gorbals in Glasgow initially mirrored that of traditional shtetl life; however, concerns around this being a contributing factor to a rise in antisemitism led to the established Jewish community establishing various philanthropic and welfare organisations with the goals of offering assistance to the refugees, including support in assimilating into Scottish society. Similarly the Edinburgh Jewish Literary Society was founded in 1888 for the purpose of teaching British culture to the Jewish immigrant population of Edinburgh and is still active today, albeit with a different focus. The passing of the Aliens Act 1905 and the onset of World War I led to a substantial decrease in the number of Jewish refugees arriving in Scotland.

In Edinburgh, the appointment of Rabbi Dr. Salis Daiches in 1918 was the catalyst for the unification of several disparate communities into a single Edinburgh Hebrew Congregation serving both the established anglicised Jews and the more recent Yiddish-speaking Eastern European immigrants. Daiches also worked to foster good relations between the Jewish community and wider secular society, and under his influence funds were raised for the building of the Edinburgh Synagogue, opened in 1932, the only purpose–built synagogue in the city.

Refugees from Nazi Germany and the Second World War further augmented the Scottish Jewish community, which has been estimated to have reached over 20,000 in the mid-20th century. By way of comparison, the Jewish population in the United Kingdom peaked at 500,000, but declined to just over half that number by 2008.

Whittinghame Farm School operated from 1939 to 1941 as a shelter for 160 children who had arrived in Britain as part of the Kindertransport mission. It was established in Whittinghame House in East Lothian, the family home of the Earl of Balfour and the birthplace of Arthur Balfour, author of the Balfour Declaration. The children were taught agricultural techniques in anticipation of settling in Palestine after the war.

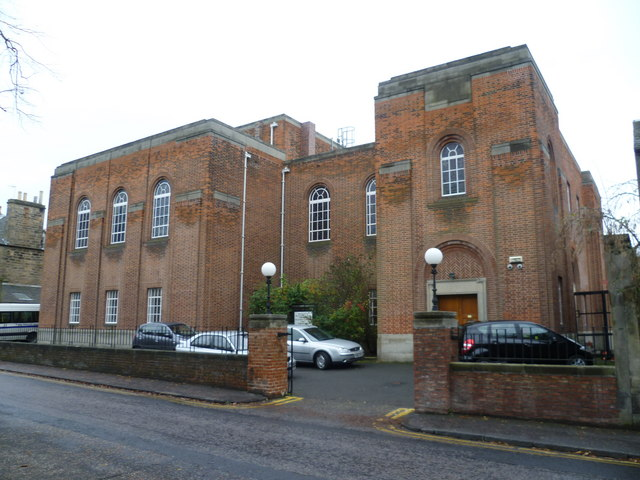
The Edinburgh Synagogue in the Newington district of the city

The practising Jewish population continues to fall in Scotland, as many younger Jews either became secular, or intermarried with other faiths. Scottish Jews have also emigrated in large numbers to England, the United States, Israel, Canada, Australia and New Zealand for economic reasons, as other Scots have done. According to the 2001 census, 6,448 Jews lived in Scotland. According to the 2011 census, 5,887 Jews lived in Scotland, a decline of 8.7% from 2001. 41% (2,399) of Scottish Jews live in the local authority area of East Renfrewshire, Greater Glasgow, making up 2.65% of the population there. 25% of Scottish Jews live in the Greater Glasgow suburb of Newton Mearns alone. Many Jewish families slowly moved southwards to more prosperous suburban areas in Greater Glasgow, from more central areas of Glasgow over the generations. Glasgow city itself has 897 Jews (15% of the Jewish population) living there, whilst Edinburgh has 855 (also 15%). The area with the least Jewish people was the Outer Hebrides, which reported just 3 Jews (0.05%) living there.

In March 2008, a Jewish tartan was designed by Brian Wilton for Chabad rabbi Mendel Jacobs of Glasgow and certified by the Scottish Tartans Authority. The tartan's colors are blue, white, silver, red and gold. According to Jacobs: "The blue and white represent the colours of the Scottish and Israeli flags, with the central gold line representing the gold from the Biblical Tabernacle, the Ark of the Covenant and the many ceremonial vessels ... the silver is from the decorations that adorn the Scroll of Law and the red represents the traditional red Kiddush wine."

Jewish communities in Scotland are represented by the Jewish Council of Scotland.

== Historic antisemitism ==
In the Middle Ages, while Jews in England faced state persecution culminating in the Edict of Expulsion of 1290, there was never a corresponding expulsion from Scotland, suggesting either greater religious tolerance or the simple fact that there was no Jewish presence at that time. In his autobiographical work Two Worlds, the eminent Scottish-Jewish scholar David Daiches, son of Rabbi Salis Daiches, wrote that his father would often declare that Scotland is one of the few European countries with no history of state persecution of Jews.

== Modern antisemitism ==
Some elements of the British Union of Fascists formed in 1932 were anti-Jewish and Alexander Raven Thomson, one of its main ideologues, was a Scot. Blackshirt meetings were physically attacked in Edinburgh by communists and "Protestant Action", which believed the group to be an Italian (i.e. Roman Catholic) intrusion. In fact, William Kenefick of Dundee University has claimed that bigotry was diverted away from Jews by anti-Catholicism, particularly in Glasgow where the main ethnic chauvinist agitation was against Irish Catholics. Archibald Maule Ramsay, a Scottish Unionist MP claimed that World War II was a "Jewish war" and was the only MP in the UK interned under Defence Regulation 18B. In the Gorbals at least, neither Louise Sless nor Woolf Silver recall antisemitic sentiment. (See also Jews escaping from Nazi Europe to Britain.) As a result of rising antisemitism in the United Kingdom by the 1930s, Jewish leadership bodies including the Glasgow Jewish Representative Council adopted a position of trying to prevent drawing attention to the city's Jewish population, such as through the promotion of assimilation. This was in line with the national leadership at the Board of Deputies of British Jews, although the Edinburgh Jewish Representative Council was notably more active and visible in its campaigning for support to be offered to German Jews.

In 2012, the Scottish Jewish Student Chaplaincy and the Scottish Council of Jewish Communities reported a "toxic atmosphere" at the University of Edinburgh, in which Jewish students were forced to hide their identity.

In September 2013, the Scottish Council of Jewish Communities published the "Being Jewish in Scotland" project, which researched the situation of Jewish people in Scotland through interviews and focus group attended by approximately 180 participants. The report included data from the Community Security Trust that, during 2011, there were 10 antisemitic incidents of abusive behaviour, 9 incidents of damage and desecration to Jewish property, and one assault. Some participants described experiences of antisemitism in their workplace, campus and at school.

During the Operation Protective Edge, in August 2014, the Scottish Council of Jewish Communities reported a sharp increase in antisemitic incidents. During the first week of August, there were 12 antisemitic incidents – almost as many as in the whole of 2013. A few months later, an irritating chemical was thrown on a member of staff selling Kedem (Israeli cosmetics) products in Glasgow's St Enoch Centre. In 2015, the Scottish government published statistics on abusive behaviour in Religiously Aggravated Offending in Scotland in 2014–15, covering the Protective Edge period, which noted an increase in the number of charges filed for anti-Jewish acts from 9 in 2014 (2% of those charged with religious offences) to 25 in 2015 (4% of total). Most dealt with "threatening and abusive behavior" and "offensive communications". The penalty imposed on those convicted was typically a fine.

Antisemitism continues to be a topic of political debate in Scotland. In 2017 the Scottish Government formally adopted the International Holocaust Remembrance Alliance's (IHRA) definition of antisemitism.

== Scots-Yiddish ==
Scots-Yiddish is the name given to a Jewish hybrid vernacular between Scots and Yiddish, which had a brief currency in the Lowlands in the first half of the 20th century. The Scottish literary historian David Daiches describes it in his autobiographical account of his Edinburgh Jewish childhood, Two Worlds.

Daiches explores the social stratification of Edinburgh's Jewish society in the interwar period, noting what is effectively a class divide between two parts of the community, on the one hand a highly educated and well-integrated group who sought a synthesis of Orthodox Rabbinical and modern secular thinking, on the other a Yiddish-speaking group most comfortable maintaining the lifestyle of the Eastern European ghetto. The Yiddish-speaking population grew up in Scotland in the 19th century, but by the late 20th century had mostly switched to using English. The creolisation of Yiddish with Scots was therefore a phenomenon of the middle part of this period.

Daiches describes how this language was spoken by the band of itinerant salesmen known as "trebblers" who travelled by train to the coastal towns of Fife peddling their wares from battered suitcases. He notes that Scots preserves some Germanic words lost in standard English but preserved in Yiddish, for example "licht" for light or "lift" for air (German "Luft").

The Glaswegian Jewish poet A C Jacobs also refers to his language as Scots-Yiddish. The playwright and director Avrom Greenbaum also published a handful of Scots-Yiddish poems in the Glasgow Jewish Echo in the 1960s; these are now housed in the Scottish Jewish Archives Centre in Glasgow. In 2020 the poet David Bleiman won the first prize and Hugh MacDiarmaid Tassie in the Scots Language Association Sangschaw competition for his poem "The Trebbler's Tale" written in "macaronic" Scots-Yiddish. Bleiman describes the poem as being 5% "found" Scots-Yiddish, the rest being reimagined and reconstituted from the component languages.

== List of Scottish Jews ==
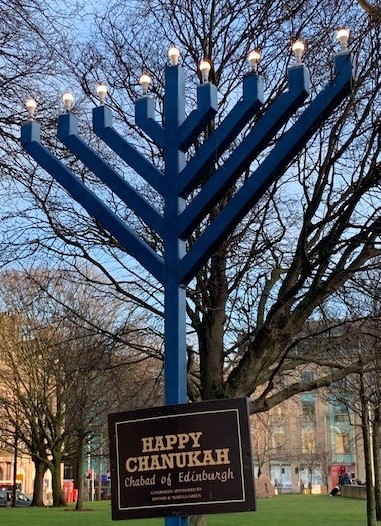
Edinburgh Menorah 2021

- Ronni Ancona, comedian
- Jenni Calder, writer
- Philip Caplan, Lord Caplan, first Jewish Court of Session judge
- Hazel, Lady Cosgrove, first female Court of Session judge
- Ivor Cutler, musician, teacher and comedian
- Noam Dar, professional wrestler
- Shamai Davidson, psychotherapist and Holocaust scholar
- Sir Monty Finniston, industrialist
- Hannah Frank, artist and sculptor
- Myer Lord Galpern, MP, Lord Provost of Glasgow
- Ralph Glasser, psychologist and economist (born in Leeds but grew up in Glasgow)
- Sir Abraham Goldberg, physician and medical professor
- Muriel Gray, author and presenter of The Tube
- Jeremy Isaacs, broadcaster, born in Glasgow from what were described as "Scottish Jewish roots".
- A C Jacobs, poet
- Mark Knopfler, Dire Straits co-founder, lead vocalist and lead guitarist
- Kevin Macdonald, director, known for Touching the Void
- Isi Metzstein, architect
- Saul Metzstein, filmmaker
- Neil Primrose, MP and soldier, younger son of Hannah de Rothschild
- Malcolm Rifkind, politician
- Hugo Rifkind, broadcaster
- Harry Primrose, 6th Earl of Rosebery, Secretary of State for Scotland, elder son of Hannah de Rothschild
- Jerry Sadowitz, controversial comedian and conjurer
- Benno Schotz, sculptor
- Manny Shinwell, politician
- J. David Simons, novelist
- Dame Muriel Spark, novelist
- Harry, Lord Woolf, judge, brought up and educated in Scotland
- Scottie Wilson, artist

== See also ==
- History of the Jews in Ireland
- History of the Jews in Wales
- History of the Jews in England
- The Scottish Council of Jewish Communities
- List of British Jews
- List of Jewish communities in the United Kingdom
