= David Bleiman =

- Born: 1953 (age 72–73); Cape Town
- Known for: Trade unionist and poet

David Bleiman (born 1953) is a writer, poet and trade unionist based in Scotland.

Bleiman was born in Cape Town, South Africa in 1953 and moved first to London, then to Scotland.

Bleiman was the first Scottish official of the Association of University Teachers (University and College Union) and served as assistant general secretary. He served as President of the Scottish Trades Union Congress in 2002.

His poem, The Trebbler's Tale won the Sangschaw Prize in 2020.

He writes in Scots-Yiddish a dialect also favoured by poet AC Jacobs and writer David Daiches.

== Publications ==
- Labour and Scottish Nationalism (1979)
- This Kilt of Many Colours (2021)
- Tongue Stramash (2025)
- Gathering Light: A Cramond Causeway (2022)
