= SJAC =

SJAC may refer to:

- Scottish Jewish Archives Centre, a repository of Jewish migration to Scotland
- St. John Ambulance Canada, the Canadian chapter of St. John Ambulance, a first aid training organization
- Stonewall Jackson Area Council, a local council of the Boy Scouts of America, a youth organization, in Virginia and West Virginia, USA
