= Charles Frank (disambiguation) =

Charles Frank (born 1947) is an American actor.

Charles Frank may also refer to:

- Sir Charles Frank (physicist) (1911–1998), British theoretical physicist
- Charles Frank Ltd, an optical and scientific instrument maker in Glasgow, Scotland
- Charles Frank (instrument maker) (1865–?), optical and scientific instrument maker from Glasgow, Scotland

== See also ==
- Charlie Frank (1891–1961), South African cricketer
- Charlie Frank (baseball) (1870–1922), Major League Baseball player
- Charles Franks, founder of Distributed Proofreaders
