= Frank Charles =

Frank Charles may refer to:

- Frank Charles (speedway rider) (1908–1939), British international motorcycle speedway rider
- Frank Charles (baseball) (born 1969), baseball catcher

== See also ==
- Charles Frank (disambiguation)
