= Brian the Brain =

- Space: 1999 episode
- Episode no.: Series 2 Episode 8
- Directed by: Kevin Connor
- Written by: Jack Ronder
- Editing by: Alan Killick
- Production code: SPII 9
- Original air date: 2 October 1976

Guest appearances
- Bernard Cribbins as Captain Michael and the voice of Brian; Marc Zuber as Security Lieutenant; Michael Sharvell-Martin as Robot Brian; Annie Lambert as Alphan Operative; Robert Reeves as Peter; Quentin Pierre as Security Guard

Episode chronology
← Previous "The Taybor"	Next → "The Rules of Luton"

"Brian the Brain" is the eighth episode of the second series of Space: 1999 (and the 32nd episode overall of the programme). The screenplay was written by Jack Ronder; the director was Kevin Connor. The final shooting script is dated 5 May 1976, with amendments dated 11 May 1976. Live action filming took place Tuesday 18 May 1976 through Wednesday 2 June 1976.

== Plot ==
Alpha's Computer indicates that the Moon is changing course. The only object nearby is a planetoid, whose gravity is too weak to affect the Moon. As the Alphans wonder whether Computer is malfunctioning, an Earth spacecraft – a Swift – appears. The pilot identifies himself as a member of Star Mission, an interstellar expedition which left Earth in 1996.

Landing at Alpha, the pilot is revealed to be a wheeled artificial intelligence that integrates with the Swift's computer. The Alphans call the robot "Brian" after it reveals that it once mispronounced the word "brain". Friendly and talkative, Brian is the sole survivor of Star Mission. His human colleagues mysteriously died after landing on the nearby planetoid, designated "Planet D". After an electronic dialogue with Computer, Brian offers to investigate the Moon's course change if the Alphans help him to identify what killed the explorers.

Brian, Commander Koenig and Dr Russell return to the Swift, which Brian launches. Suddenly terse, Brian tells Koenig and Russell they are going to Planet D – and he will eject them into space if they resist.

On Alpha, Brian's actions have crippled Computer. Controller Verdeschi launches Eagles to intercept the Swift and rescue Koenig and Russell. Fearing that Brian will knock out the Eagles' computers, Koenig orders them back to Alpha.

Reaching Planet D, which is covered in mist and toxic gases, Brian lands near Star Mission's mothership. He reveals his purpose in abducting Koenig and Russell: unable to navigate the terrain, he needs them to retrieve the mothership's nuclear core and install it on the Swift. This will give Brian enough fuel to roam the universe for aeons. While Russell stays behind to guarantee cooperation, Koenig dons a protective suit and sets off for the mothership. Along the way, he finds corpses of Star Mission crew members poisoned by the atmosphere. On the Swift, Brian tells Russell he was created by Star Mission leader Captain Michael, whom he regards as his "father".

Boarding the mothership, Koenig finds Verdeschi and Maya, who ignored his order to turn their Eagle back. The Alphans discover Michael's corpse and determine that the mothership's computer was sabotaged, suggesting that Brian was responsible for the deaths. They also find a half-built robot resembling Brian.

Koenig has a plan. He returns to the Swift with Maya, transformed into a mouse and hiding in his suit. He sets up the nuclear core and Brian takes off. As Maya gnaws Brian's antenna, Koenig says the mouse is carrying a message of revenge from Michael. He charges Brian with killing the Star Mission crew to prevent them from replacing him with a superior robot brain: the unfinished machine on the mothership. Maya shapeshifts into Michael, panicking Brian, and together, Koenig and Maya wear the robot down with one accusation after another. When Brian flees to an airlock, Koenig ejects him into space. Over the radio, Brian begs for mercy.

The Alphans recover Brian and use his memory core to restore Computer. Sensors confirm that the Moon's course is unchanged, showing that Brian was manipulating the situation from the beginning. The robot will be reactivated once he has been re-programmed with a sense of ethics.

== Regular cast ==
- Martin Landau as Commander John Koenig
- Barbara Bain as Dr Helena Russell
- Catherine Schell as Maya
- Tony Anholt as Tony Verdeschi
- John Hug as Astronaut Bill Fraser
- Yasuko Nagazumi as Yasko

== Production ==
The scene where the Alphans begin their psychological attack on Brian was scripted to have Maya first resume her normal form. As the robot became agitated, the three Alphans would comment that it required maintenance and would bombard Brian with pleas to be the one to perform the task. At this point, Maya would appear as Captain Michael to further confound the Brain. This sequence was deleted from the final cut. Also removed was a line where Brian commented that Computer was incapable of speech (in direct contradiction of numerous earlier episodes where the Computer voice was performed by Barbara Kelly).

Cast in the dual role of the late Captain Michael and the voice of his mad robotic creation, 'Brian', was British actor and comedian Bernard Cribbins, then known for voicing all the characters in the BBC children's programme The Wombles and as a celebrity story-reader on Jackanory.

To allow for a natural rapport to develop between the actors and 'Brian', Cribbins performed the voice during the live-action filming (which was then altered in post-production to give it a metallic quality). The robot prop was operated by Michael Sharvell-Martin, a British actor and pantomime dame best remembered for his supporting roles in The Benny Hill Show and No Place Like Home.

This would be the final episode where viewers would see the original version of Maya's Psychon make-up. ITC executives felt Catherine Schell's vision with the brown-pigmented ears read on screen as 'dirty'. After this, her ears would be left natural and the 'sideburn' cheekbone pigment would become less prominent.

The Swift miniature was designed by Ron Burton as a landing craft for the Gerry Anderson production The Day After Tomorrow. Built by model builder Martin Bower, the Bray Studios effects team added the two large upper tanks to contain the freon gas used to simulate the ship's rocket exhaust.

== Reception ==
John Kenneth Muir considered "Brian the Brain" one of the stronger Series 2 episodes, calling it an "entertaining and satisfactory adventure", though he believed that it contradicted character backstories from Series 1 and he regretted that neither Brian nor the Swift were seen in later episodes. He especially praised the "intelligent" plot and character development, describing Brian as ironically "one of the most interestingly 'human' of all the Space: 1999 villains." SciFiNow magazine counted Cribbins' performance as one of Series 2's standout guest appearances. Giving the episode a "B" rating, SFX magazine commented that Cribbins and the design of the Brian robot "steal the show".

The episode was praised for a scene aboard the Swift in which Brian devises a "love test" for Koenig and Russell by threatening them each with suffocation in a depressurised airlock: each is prepared to sacrifice him- or herself to save the other, giving Brian a means to control them both. TV Zone magazine called the scene "nailbiting stuff".

On the other hand, Dreamwatch Bulletin called the episode a "syrupy, soporific shambles", rating it 5 out of 10 with criticism of the writing and acting.

== Novelisation ==
The episode was adapted in the second Year Two Space: 1999 novel Mind-Breaks of Space by Michael Butterworth and J. Jeff Jones published in 1977. The deleted sequences noted above were included in the manuscript.
