= Stefan Reif =

Professor Emeritus of History

Stefan Clive Reif OBE (born 21 January 1944) is professor emeritus at the University of Cambridge. He was born in Edinburgh. He has a PhD from University College London and a Doctor of Literature from Cambridge.

== Education ==
Stefan Reif graduated at the University of London with first class honours in Hebrew and Aramaic (1964) and obtained his PhD at Jews' College and at University College London (1969) for an edition of a seventeenth-century Hebrew liturgical manuscript. He was awarded the William Lincoln Shelley Studentship (1967).

== Academic positions ==
- 1968–1973 Various academic posts at the University of Glasgow and at Dropsie College (Philadelphia)
- Fellow of St. John's College
- Professor of Medieval Hebrew, Faculty of Oriental Studies
- Founder Director (1973–2006) of the Taylor-Schechter Genizah Research Unit (researching manuscripts from the Cairo Geniza)
- 1989, 1996–97 Visiting professor at the Hebrew University in Jerusalem
- 2001 Visiting professor at the Center for Jewish Studies, University of Pennsylvania
- 2004 Visiting professor at George Washington University in 2004

Former Head of the Oriental Division of the University Library.

== Career highlights ==
The University Library established the Genizah Research Unit in 1974 and Reif directed it until retirement in 2006. He was elected to a personal chair in medieval Hebrew studies and to a fellowship at St John's College at the University of Cambridge in 1998, and obtained the Litt.D. there in 2002. He was awarded an honorary doctorate by the University of Haifa in 2014 for his Genizah work, his research into Jewish liturgy and his encouragement of young scholars. He has written or edited fifteen volumes, as well as almost four hundred articles and reviews, and organized various international conferences. Among his most important studies are Shabbethai Sofer and his Prayer-book (1979), Judaism and Hebrew Prayer (1993), Hebrew Manuscripts at Cambridge University Library (1997), A Jewish Archive from Old Cairo (2000), Why Medieval Hebrew Studies? (2001), Problems with Prayers (2006) and Jewish Prayer Texts from the Cairo Genizah (2015–16).

== Other activities ==
Reif was president of the Hebraica Libraries' Group (1981–1984); the Jewish Historical Society of England (1991–1992); the British Association for Jewish Studies (1992); the Cambridge Theological Society (2002–2004); and the National Council on Orientalist Library Resources, (2004-2005). He is a trustee of the Cambridge Traditional Jewish Congregation and a senior academic consultant to the Universities of Haifa and Tel Aviv in Israel. He is on the International Advisory Committees of the ISDCL and of the periodical Ginzei Qedem, and is an Honorary Fellow of the Mekize Nirdamim Society for the Publication of Ancient Hebrew Manuscripts. Reif is a popular lecturer and has addressed many audiences in Europe, Israel, the United States and Canada.

He was appointed Officer of the Order of the British Empire (OBE) in the 2020 Birthday Honours for services to scholarship.

== See also ==
- List of Scottish Jews
