= Julius Conradus Otto =

Professor of Hebrew

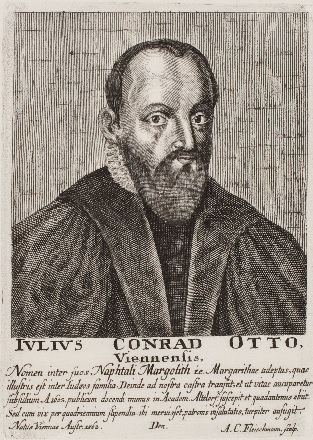
Copper engraving of Julius Conradus Otto by August Christian Fleischmann, 1728

Julius Conradus Otto (b. 1562; also known as Naphthali Margolioth, נפתלי מרגליות), was the first Professor of Hebrew at the University of Edinburgh. Contemporary records identify him as the son of Maria Magdalena and Martin Philipp, born 1562 in Vienna, although his exact birthplace is unclear; he himself published a work on Psalms in 1614 as Julius Otto Pragensis, "Julius Otto of Prague".

Otto seems to have been born as Naphtahali Margolioth, converted to Christianity in 1603 (taking on his Christian name), and reverted back to Judaism later on. Depending on the date of his reversion, this timeline could place him as the first recorded Jew living in Edinburgh, around the same time as David Brown and Paulus Scialitti Rabin.

He was appointed as Professor of Hebrew at the University of Altdorf in 1603 and Professor of Hebrew and Oriental Languages at Edinburgh in 1641 or 1642. He was succeeded as Chair of Hebrew by Alexander Dickson.

Scholars are unsure whether there existed one or two contemporary individuals by this name, and whether the Edinburgh professor appointed in 1642 was the Otto born in 1562 or his son.
