= Charles Frank (instrument maker) =

Scottish scientific instrument maker (1865–1959)

- Born: 1865; Vilkomir, Kovno Governorate, Russian Empire
- Died: 1959; Glasgow, Scotland
- Scientific career
- Fields: Astronomical optics

Charles Frank (1865–1959) was an optical and scientific instrument maker from Glasgow, Scotland.

== Life ==
Charles Frank was born in Vilkomir, Lithuania, in 1865. By 1910 he had immigrated to Glasgow and set himself up first as a mechanic. After a few years he married another immigrant, Miriam Lipetz, and eventually opened a shop at 67 Saltmarket for the design, sale and repair of photographic and scientific apparatus. Over the following half century it was to become one of the best-known photographic centers in the city and a byword for excellence in cameras and watches. At some later stage the business expanded into a second premises located in Glasgow town centre at Ingram Street. This became a more upmarket showroom for the sale of his scientific instruments. A number of pieces from his optical instrument collection were placed on display there.

Like many Jewish immigrants to Glasgow, he settled in the Laurieston district of the Gorbals, first at 104 South Portland Street and then at 28 Abbotsford Place in 1917. A year or so later Frank moved south to 72 Dixon Avenue in Crosshill, an area popular with up-and-coming Jewish families and which, like the Gorbals, had its share of synagogues and kosher shops. Around 1950 Frank moved to Giffnock, to spend his old age in the growing Jewish community there.

== Family ==
Charles and Miriam Frank had four children, Leo, Hannah, Arthur and Morris.

Hannah Frank graduated in 1930 from the University of Glasgow, became a teacher and studied at the Glasgow School of Art. A talented artist, she became a sculptor and continued to work in this medium, to critical acclaim, until the eve of her 90th birthday.

Arthur Frank took over his father's business and ran it successfully until the mid-1970s. The business was sold when Arthur Frank's wife Doris became ill.

== Present day ==
While the original Charles Frank Ltd has ceased trading the rights to the name were acquired by former staff after the business was sold off. Charles Frank Ltd now trades from 101 Rose Street Edinburgh and specialises in retail and wholesale Binoculars and Telescopes.

== The Arthur Frank Collection ==
Arthur Frank, Charles Frank's son was an avid collector of optical instruments. This grew to become one of the most important collections of historic instruments in Britain. It remained with the family until Arthur Frank decided to sell the collection at auction. The collection was sold as 'The Arthur Frank Collection of Scientific Instruments' at Sotheby's Auction House on Tuesday 25 March 1986, with Arthur Frank in attendance. 808 lots were sold. A number of pieces now reside in Scottish museums. Arthur Frank continued to sell other pieces from his collection on eBay, becoming an avid Ebayer well into his late eighties.

== See also ==
- Jews in Scotland
- Scientific instruments
