= Joseph Hart Myers =

Jewish physician (1758–1823)

Joseph Hart Myers (April 1758 – 1 June 1823) was a physician who, in 1779, became the first Jew to graduate from a British university after a due period of undergraduate study. After completing his studies at the University of Edinburgh, he went on to become a prominent member of London's medical and Jewish communities.

== Early life and education ==
Myers was born in April 1758 in Hanover Square, New York. His father was Naphtali Hart Myers (1711-1788), a successful merchant. His mother was Hester Moses (1730-1812), the granddaughter of Aaron Hart.

He received his elementary education in New York before moving to London, where he attended lectures by William Hunter and George Fordyce. Although Hart Myers aspired to study medicine at the University of Oxford, his father did not approve of this choice as it would require Myers to take a Christian oath. Subsequently, he went to the University of Edinburgh instead, where no Christian oath was required. He began his studies there in 1775 and graduated in 1779, producing a dissertation about diabetes.

After graduating, Myers embarked on a medical grand tour of Europe. He spent time in Leiden, Paris, Berlin, Vienna and Rome. In Paris, he studied the use of symphysiotomy as an alternative to caesarean section. He then settled in London.

== Career ==
Myers was an active figure in the medical community. On 25 June 1787, he was admitted Licentiate to the College of Physicians. In 1805, he became a founding member of the Medical and Chirurgical Society. He was also a Fellow of the Medical Society of London.

Myers practiced medicine from his home on John Street. His home served as a smallpox vaccination station for the Royal Jennerian Society from 1803. In 1785, he was elected Doctor to the Poor by the Bevis Marks Synagogue. In 1791, he became physician to the Royal Cumberland Freemasons' School in 1791. He also helped to establish the Sea-Bathing Infirmary in Margate and fundraised for the founding of the Naval Asylum.

Myers was also an important member of both Ashkenazi and Shephardi communities. He served as Warden to the Great Synagogue of London, a role has father had also fulfilled. He assisted in the founding of the Jews' Hospital and additionally served as its first physician. Myers was the vice-president and then president of the Jews' Free School until 1815.

Through his marriage to Jane Salmons, he was connected to the leaders of the Hambro Synagogue and Levy Barent Cohen, who was her brother-in-law. It has been suggested that this means Myers may have served as the physician to Cohen and his family, further evidenced by the marriage of Myers' daughter Rebecca and Cohen's son Isaac.

== Personal life ==
On 6 April 1785, Myers married Jane Salmons (née Diamantschleifer). She was the widow of Jacob Salomons, a merchant. Jane Salmons died in 1786. They had no children.

In May 1792, Myers married Leah Jacobs. They had three children: Rebecca Hart Myers (13 February 1793-1819), Maria Hart Myers (10 March 1794-November 1868) and Naphtali Hart Myers (21 May 1796-July 1797).

== Death ==
Myers died on 1 June 1823 at the age of 65. Prevented by gout, he had not practiced medicine for a year prior to his death.

== See also ==
- History of the Jews in Scotland
