= Hilda Goldwag =

Austrian-born Scottish artist

- Born: 28 April 1912; Vienna, Austria
- Died: 28 January 2008 (aged 95); Bishopbriggs, East Dunbartonshire, Scotland
- Education: Staatliche Graphische Lehr und Versuchsanstalt, Vienna

Hilda Goldwag (28 April 1912 – 28 January 2008) was an artist whose works included paintings, book illustrations and commercial designs. She was born in Vienna, Austria, but moved to Scotland in 1939 to escape the Nazis. Many of her paintings are of the life and buildings of mid-to-late twentieth century Glasgow.

== Biography ==
One of three children, Goldwag was raised primarily by her mother, Szerena, following the death of her artist and gallery-owner father, Moses Leopold Goldwag, when she was nine years old.

Hilda attended Anna Schantruch Art Classes in Vienna and was one of a number of pupils chosen to paint murals for the Sandleitener Kindergarten. Despite the Nazi Anschluss of Austria in March 1938, she graduated from the Staatliche Graphische Lehr- und Versuchsanstalt in Vienna later in 1938.

Goldwag moved to Scotland, as a refugee, in March 1939 to escape persecution by the Nazis. Her family was due to follow her six months later, but World War II was declared the day they received their travel permits, causing them to be trapped in Austria. In 1942, during The Holocaust, they all were murdered in extermination camps: her mother at Treblinka, and her brother, sister, brother-in-law and nephew at Maly Trostenets. Her sadness at the loss of family members can be felt in much of Goldwag's art.

Hilda was assisted by the Scottish Domestic Bureau for Refugee Women, a combined Jewish and Quaker women's initiative and met her lifelong friend, and fellow refugee, Cecile (Cecilia Zoé) Schwarzschild (12 May 1914 – 1998), in Edinburgh in 1939 at the Quaker Meeting House. Hilda worked as a domestic help for a Church of Scotland minister in West Linton. Hilda and Cecile relocated to Glasgow to take up war work at McGlashlan's Engineering Works in Govan. They lived together at 155 Hill Street, Garnethill.

From 1945 to 1955, Goldwag was the head designer at the textile company Friedlanders in Hillington, work which included designing scarves for Marks & Spencer. She also undertook freelance illustration work for the publishers Collins. She illustrated the 1955 edition of Robert Louis Stevenson's A Child's Garden of Verse. From 1962 to 1975, Goldwag worked part-time at Foresthall Hospital as an occupational therapist while continuing to paint. Although Goldwag painted several portraits of Schwarzschild from the early 1950s onwards, she did not become a full-time painter until retirement. Goldwag painted landscapes and industrial buildings, often working outdoors with oil on canvas and also painted flowers and portraits.

Goldwag's work has been described as follows:

...deeply embedded in the European tradition and, coming from the city of Klimt, Schiele, Freud and Wittgenstein, as an outsider in Glasgow, she documents a city moving from the old to the new. As well as people, she paints buildings, townscapes as designs, old tenements giving way to the modern.

During the 1980s, Goldwag had a number of exhibitions and was an active member of several artist societies, notably the Glasgow Society of Women Artists and the Scottish Society of Women Artists. Examples of her paintings are held by the Ben Uri Gallery in London, by Strathclyde University and by the Scottish Jewish Archives Centre.
