= Scottish Jewish Archives Centre =

Repository of Jewish migration to Scotland

Coordinates: 55.8672°N 4.2678°W

- Established: 1987
- Location: Garnethill Synagogue, 129 Hill Street, Garnethill, Glasgow, Lanarkshire, Scotland
- Director: Harvey Kaplan

The Scottish Jewish Archives Centre (SJAC) is the largest repository of items relating to Jewish migration to Scotland and life in Scotland. It aims to document and illustrate the religious, organisational, social, economic, political, cultural and family life of Jews in Scotland from the 18th century to the present-day in order to heighten awareness - and to stimulate study of - the country's Jewish heritage.

SJAC has an independent approach to collecting and accepts donations in the form in which they are offered as long as there is a connection to Jewish history. Through its acquisition efforts and outreach work, SJAC is helping to preserve the materiality of the Scottish Jewish past and curating these historical traces for the present.

SJAC collections have been used in family history projects relating to the Scottish Jewish community, such as 200 Years of Scottish Jewry, in collaboration with the Scottish Council of Jewish Communities, Glasgow Jewish Representative Council and the International Institute for Jewish Genealogy.

== History ==
The once large and active Jewish community of the Gorbals - the former immigrant district of Glasgow just south of the River Clyde - began to be dismantled from the late 1950s onwards as many buildings were demolished in efforts to regenerate the area. In 1979, centenary celebrations for Garnethill Synagogue included an exhibition, but nothing permanent ensued from this venture.

In 1984, the Gorbals Fair Society, a non-Jewish social and cultural group, embarked on a project on the history of the area, beginning with the story of the decades of Jewish settlement there, producing both an exhibition and accompanying booklet, 'A Scottish Shtetl: Jewish Life in the Gorbals, 1881-1974'.

The Scottish Jewish Archives Centre arose from the 'Jewish Archives Project' established in 1985, which had followed debate in the Glasgow-based Jewish Echo newspaper and in the Glasgow Jewish Representative Council about the need for a Scottish counterpart to Jewish museums and historical research groups found, for example, in London, Manchester, Dublin, Bristol and Birmingham.

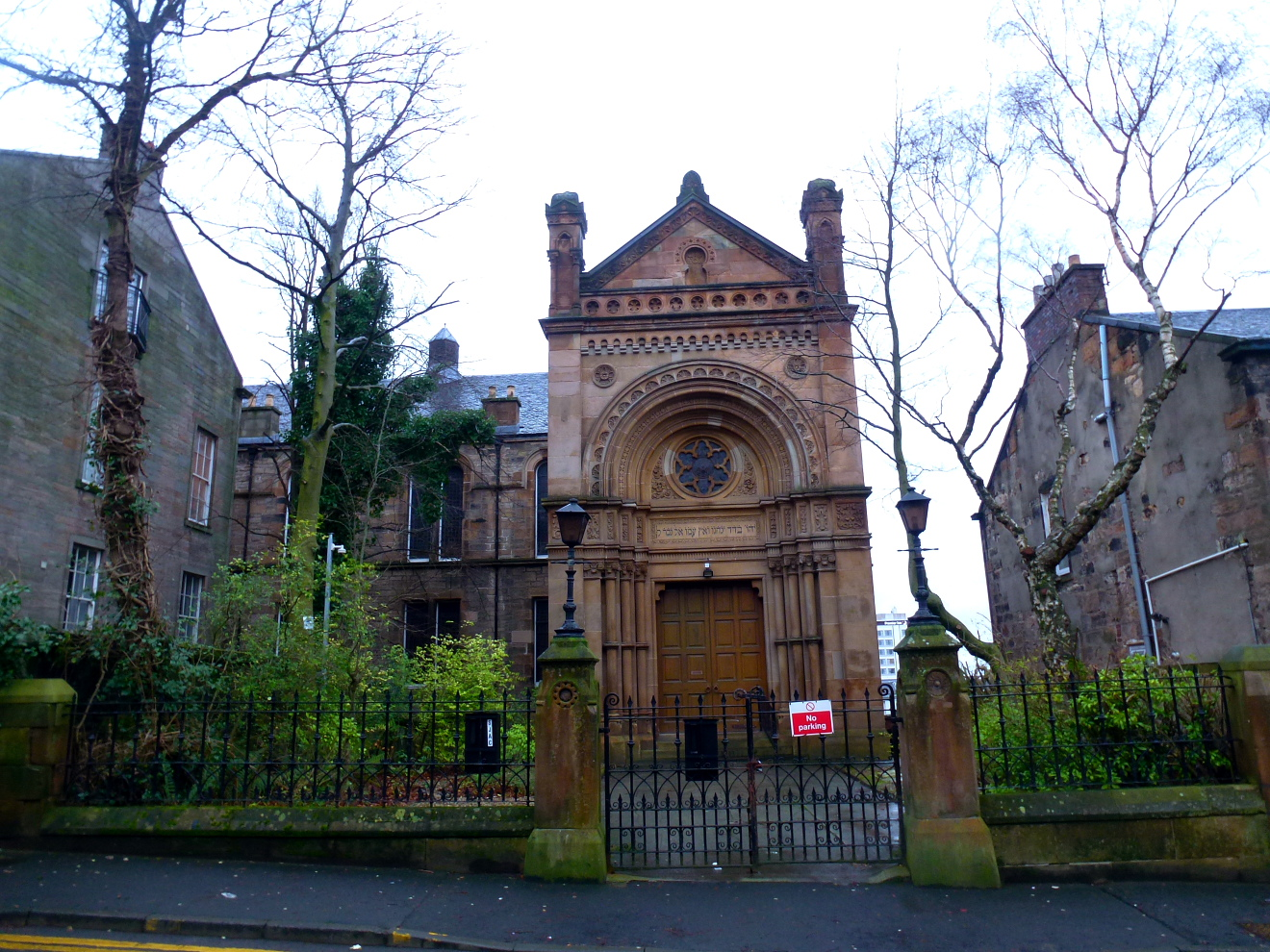
The Scottish Jewish Archives Centre is based at Garnethill Synagogue.

SJAC opened at a public meeting in April 1987, Garnethill Hebrew Congregation providing headquarters within Garnethill Synagogue.

In the same period that SJAC emerged, interest in social history had been developing in a number of British Jewish communities creating, for example, the Museum of the Jewish East End (established 1983) - now part of the Jewish Museum London - and Manchester Jewish Museum (established 1984).

== Access ==
The Scottish Jewish Archives Centre (SJAC) documents, preserves, exhibits and publishes aspects of its collections; it also offers support to community, academic and family history researchers. It is open to members of the public, but access must be arranged by appointment. In addition to monthly Sunday public openings, there are also volunteer-led guided tours on the building's history, architecture and key early 19th-century congregants.

SJAC Open Days and fundraising events have included distinguished speakers such as Chaim Bermant, Alan Brodie, Maria Chamberlain, Kenneth Collins, David Daiches, Sir Monty Finniston, Michele Gold, Alex Graham, Samm Hankin, Horace Phillips, Hugo Rifkind, Ida Schuster and Michael Tobias.

The SJAC is a partner and co-founder of the Scottish Jewish Heritage Centre (SJHC), which opened in July 2021. As part of this project, SJAC created a Scottish Holocaust-era Study Centre and linked display to expand access to the Archives Centre's collections. This includes access to a digital catalogue of circa 3000 items from the refugee period and a digitised run of the weekly Glasgow-published Jewish Echo (1928-1950 only). There is also a library of Holocaust period books (extracted from the main SJAC library) and hands-on learning resources drawing on the collections of individual refugees who found sanctuary in Scotland.

== Collections ==
The Scottish Jewish Archives Centre collects a wide range of material relating to the experiences of Jewish people in Scotland since the 1700s; many families have entrusted the centre with the history of their families, in words and pictures. In addition to the larger Jewish communities of Glasgow, Edinburgh and Aberdeen, collections cover the small communities which once existed in Ayr, Dundee, Dunfermline, Falkirk, Greenock and Inverness.

In addition to books and dissertations of Jewish history and biography, SJAC holds a variety of archival sources including synagogue minute books and registers; birth, marriage and death certificates; ketubot [marriage documents]; school admission registers; burial registers; membership lists; business records; military records; identity documents; immigration and naturalisation papers; passports; legal documents; medical reports and correspondence.

=== Highlights ===
A number of organisations have lodged records with the SJAC, including:

- Glasgow (later Garnethill) Hebrew Congregation (from 1852)
- Glasgow Hebrew Philanthropic Society (1875–1881)
- Lodge Montefiore (from 1888)
- Glasgow Jewish Students' Society (from 1911)
- Glasgow Beth Din
- Glasgow Board of Shechita
- Ayr Hebrew Congregation (1942–75)
- Edinburgh Zionist Association (1930–1936)

=== Other collection items ===
The centre holds copies of the Registers of Circumcision performed by Reverend Jacob Fürst of Edinburgh (covering 1879–1907), Moses Joel of Edinburgh (covering 1831–1863), and Reverend Jack Grant of Glasgow (covering 1966–1986). SJAC has collected together the records of most of the 17 Jewish cemeteries in Scotland, including those of Glasgow Necropolis and Glasgow Eastern Necropolis (Janefield). More than 15,000 Scottish Jewish burials have been indexed. There are copies of tombstone inscriptions recorded in the late 1940s-1950s in Jewish cemeteries in Glasgow, Edinburgh and Dundee.

Personal papers belonging to people connected with the Jewish community include those of Hannah Frank. Another large collection of papers, photographs and correspondence (in Polish, Yiddish and English) relates to activities by Rabbi Major Heszel Klepfisz and Rabbi Major H Melcer, chaplains to Polish servicemen based all around Britain.

External audio
- Interview with Dorrith M. Sim from the Gathering the Voices project

There are also many examples of oral histories and personal testimonies, including those of people who arrived in Scotland on the Kindertransport, such as Dorrith Marianne Sim (m.s. Oppenheim), or as refugees or Holocaust survivors. SJAC is involved in recording and transcribing oral history interviews and training volunteers in oral history recording. SJAC also holds transcriptions of audio recordings collected by the charity project Gathering the Voices, which collects and preserves the stories of those who found sanctuary in Scotland following remarkable journeys from Nazi-dominated Europe.

Records relating to initiatives to assist refugees include the register of the Boys' Hostel opened by Garnethill Hebrew Congregation (1939–1948) in its grounds, papers of the German Jewish Aid Committee/Glasgow Jewish Council for German Refugees, the Central British Fund for German Jewry (Glasgow branch) and the Mutual Aid Refugee Society (1950–1959), and minutes of the Glasgow Women's Appeal Committee (1939–1940).

Among the collection of Scottish Jewish newspapers in hard copy, there is a complete set of the Jewish Echo (1928–1992), with access to its photo library. There are also examples of early Yiddish papers, dating from 1903 to the 1920s. There are further photographs of individuals, families, schoolchildren, youth groups, synagogues, shops and Friendly Societies.

Items of artistic interest include plaques, paintings, and sculpture by Joseph Ancill, Hilda Goldwag, Hannah Frank and Benno Schotz. Among other original artefacts are memorial boards, war medals, a ceremonial spade presented to Mr. J. Coats at the opening of Glenduffhill Cemetery in 1934, and an inscribed silver Kiddush cup from 1936. Various printed ephemera includes programmes relating to productions by the Jewish Institute Players and Avrom Greenbaum Players.

SJAC also provides access to a collection catalogue, and hosts The Family Tree of Scottish Jewry, a database containing information taken from various sources on over 100,000 Scottish Jews, which may be consulted for a fee.

Scottish Jewish Archives Centre Digital Collection website features some of its collections divided into the following themes: Theatre, Serving their Country, Migration, Refugee Period, Religious Life, Art, Soviet Jewry, Scottish Jewish Communities, Women, Relations with the Wider Community.

== Exhibitions ==
Opened in 2008, A New Life in Scotland: over 200 Years of Jewish Experience in Scotland is a permanent exhibition, featuring a timeline of Jewish history in Scotland, themed display cases, works by Scottish Jewish artists and various artefacts showing how Jewish immigrants came to Scotland, some fleeing poverty and persecution, and seeking religious tolerance, political freedom, educational opportunity and a chance to earn a better living.

== Projects ==
- Jewish Lives, Scottish Spaces a research project (funded by the Arts and Humanities Research Council) between the University of Edinburgh and the University of Glasgow ran for three years from September 2015 until August 2018: in telling the stories of Jewish immigrants who made Scotland their home, it drew primary on the collections of SJAC, as well as those of Glasgow's Mitchell Library, Glasgow City Archives, Edinburgh City Archives, the National Library of Scotland and the National Records of Scotland.
- 200 Years of Scottish Jewry, a genealogical project in collaboration with the Scottish Council of Jewish Communities, Glasgow Jewish Representative Council and the International Institute for Jewish Genealogy, which used SJAC collections and ran from 2012 to 2016.
- Garnethill Refugee Trail, a partnership project with SJHC, which tells the stories of hundreds of refugees who fled Europe to Glasgow, highlighting buildings connected with those who arrived before, during and after the Second World War, again using information from SJAC collections.

This isn’t just Jewish history, this is Scottish history. All of these refugees came here with nothing, perhaps a little bag of clothes and some photos, and were able to remake their lives here and help make our society better. It's important that we keep telling those stories. - Kerry Patterson, Manager - Scottish Jewish Heritage Centre

== Publications by Scottish Jewish Archives Centre ==
- Collins, Kenneth E. (1990) Second City Jewry: the Jews of Glasgow in the Age of Expansion, 1790-1919 (Glasgow: SJAC)
- Collins, Kenneth (2016) The Jewish Experience in Scotland: From Immigration to Integration (Glasgow: SJAC)
- Collins, Kenneth E.; Borowski, Ephraim; Granat, Leah (2008) Scotland's Jews: A Guide to the History and Community of the Jews in Scotland ] (Glasgow: SJAC with Glasgow Jewish Representative Council and the Scottish Council of Jewish Communities)
- Collins, Kenneth; Kaplan, Harvey; Kliner, Stephen (2013) Jewish Glasgow – An Illustrated History (Glasgow: SJAC)
- Collins, Kenneth E.; Newman, Aubrey; Wasserstein, Bernard (2018) Two Hundred Years of Scottish Jewry (Glasgow: SJAC)
- Conn, Adele (ed.) (2006) Glasgow Jewish Journeys (Glasgow: SJAC with Limmud Scotland)
- Frank, Fiona (ed.) (2004) Hannah Frank, A Glasgow Artist: Drawings and Sculptures (Glasgow: SJAC)
- Kaplan, H. L. (2017) Scottish Jewish Archives Centre: 30th anniversary brochure, 1987-2017
- Kaplan, Harvey L. (2006) The Gorbals Jewish Community in 1901 (Glasgow: SJAC)
- Kliner, Stephen I. (2022) The Story of Habonim-Dror (Dae ye ken Glasgow Ken?) (Glasgow: SJAC)
- Scottish Jewish Archives Centre (n.d.) Archive Collections Policy (Glasgow: SJAC)
- Scottish Jewish Archives Centre (2014) Scottish Jewish Archives Centre: Report on the Feasibility of a Scottish Holocaust Era Study Centre (Glasgow: SJAC)
- Garnethill Refugee Trail - a partnership between Scottish Jewish Heritage Centre and Scottish Jewish Archives Centre
