= Jenni Calder =

Scottish historian (born 1941)

Jenni Calder (née Daiches)
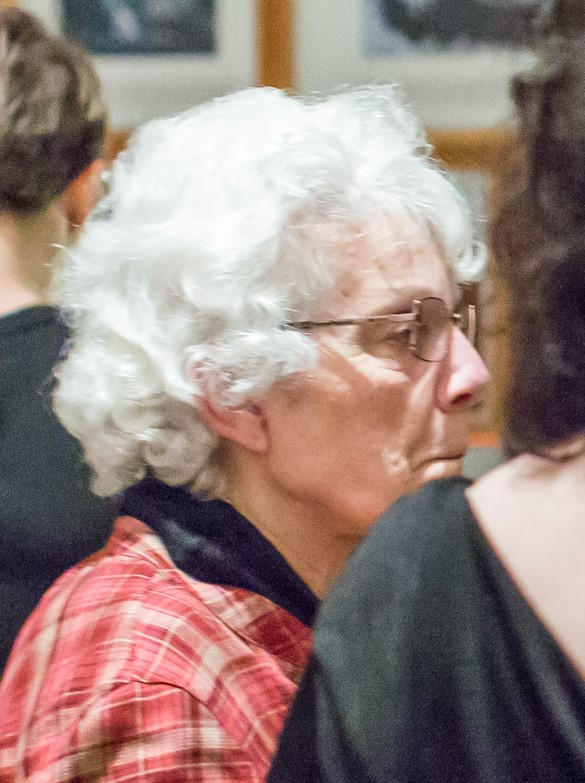
- Jenni Calder at a literary event
- Born: 1941 (age 84–85); Scotland
- Education: New Hall, University of Cambridge
- Known for: Writer, poet
- Children: 3

Jenni Calder (née Daiches) (born 1941) is a Scottish literary historian, and arts establishment figure.

== Biography ==
Calder was born to a Jewish family of Lithuanian-Jewish émigrés. She lives in Scotland and has been Edinburgh-based since. She has been part of the Scottish literary community for many years. Her teaching and writing cover Scottish, English and American literary and historical subjects.

She has written 28 books on literary and historical subjects, including biographies of Walter Scott, Robert Louis Stevenson, George Orwell and Naomi Mitchison and books on Scottish history and Scottish emigration. She has a particular research interest in emigration and the Scottish diaspora. She worked at the National Museums of Scotland from 1978 to 2001 and latterly as Head of Museum of Scotland International. In 2003 she helped to organise the National Museums of Scotland's exhibition called 'Trailblazers - the Scots in Canada'. She was president of Scottish PEN, a not-for-profit organisation that champions freedom of expression and literature across borders.

She writes fiction and poetry as "Jenni Daiches". Her novel Somewhere Else (2024) was longlisted for the Women's Prize for Fiction 2025.

She was formerly married to Angus Calder, and is the daughter of David Daiches a prominent Scottish, Jewish, writer, critic and historian. She was born in the US and spent time in Kenya. Her book Not Nebuchadnezzar is a partly a biography and a 'chronicle of the consuming search for that elusive concept known as 'identity''. She has spoken out about antisemitism.

On the question of Scottish independence; of 27 Scottish authors whose opinion was sought, Calder was one of only two offering a definite No.

== Some works ==
- Calder, Jenni (1968). Chronicles of Conscience: A Study of George Orwell and Arthur Koestler. ISBN 082295205X.
- There Must Be a Lone Ranger: The myth and reality of the American Wild West. Hamish Hamilton, 1974
- Huxley Brave New World and Orwell Nineteen Eighty Four. Edward Arnold, 1976
- Calder, Jenni (1976). Women and Marriage in Victorian Fiction. Thames & Hudson Ltd. ISBN 0500520011.
- Calder, Jenni (1977). The Victorian Home. Batsford Ltd. ISBN 0713408170.
- Calder, Jenni (1977). Heroes: From Byron to Guevara. Haminsh Hamilton. ISBN 0241895367.
- Calder, Jenni (1980). RLS: Life Study Of Robert Louis Stevenson. Hamish Hamilton. ISBN 9780241103746.
- Stevenson and Victorian Scotland. Edinburgh University Press, 1984
- Animal Farm and Nineteen Eighty Four. Open University, 1988
- The Wealth of a Nation. Publications Office, Edinburgh, 1989
- Scotland in Trust: The National Trust for Scotland, 1990
- Calder, Jenni (2017). Sir Walter Scott's Waverley. Luath Press Ltd. ISBN 9781910021262.
- Daiches, Jenni (2006). Letters from the Great Wall. Luath Press Limited. ISBN 9781905222513.
- Calder, Jenni (2013). Lost in the Backwoods. Edinburgh University Press. ISBN 9780748647392.
- Calder, Jenni (2018). Essence of Edinburgh. Luath Press Ltd. ISBN 9781912147540.
- Calder, Jenni (2019). The Burning Glass. Sandstone Press Ltd. ISBN 9781912240661.
- Calder, Jenni (2013). The Scots in Canada. Luath Press Ltd. ISBN 9781908373038.
- Calder, Jenni (2010). Frontier Scots. Luath Press Ltd. ISBN 9781906307998.
- Daiches, Jenni (2015). Forgive. Luath Press Ltd. ISBN 9781910021385.
- The Story of the Scottish Soldier, 1600-1914. National Museums of Scotland, 1992
- Enterprising Scot: Scottish Adventure and Achievement. National Museums of Scotland, 1995
- Calder, Jenni (1997). The Nine Lives of Naomi Mitchison. Virago. ISBN 1853817244.
- Scots in the USA. Luath Press, 2006
- Calder, Jenni (2005). Not Nebuchadnezzar. Luath Press Ltd. ISBN 9781842820605.
- Daiches, Jenni (2024). Somewhere Else. Scotland Street Press. ISBN 978-1-910895-95-5.
- Daiches, Jenni (2026). They Know Where They're Going. Scotland Street Press. ISBN 978-1-917881-05-0.

== Reviews ==
- Clunas, Alexander (1982), review of Stevenson and Victorian Scotland, in Murray, Glen (ed.), Cencrastus No. 8, Spring 1982, pp. 42 & 42, ISSN 0264-0856
