= J. David Simons =

Scottish novelist and short story writer

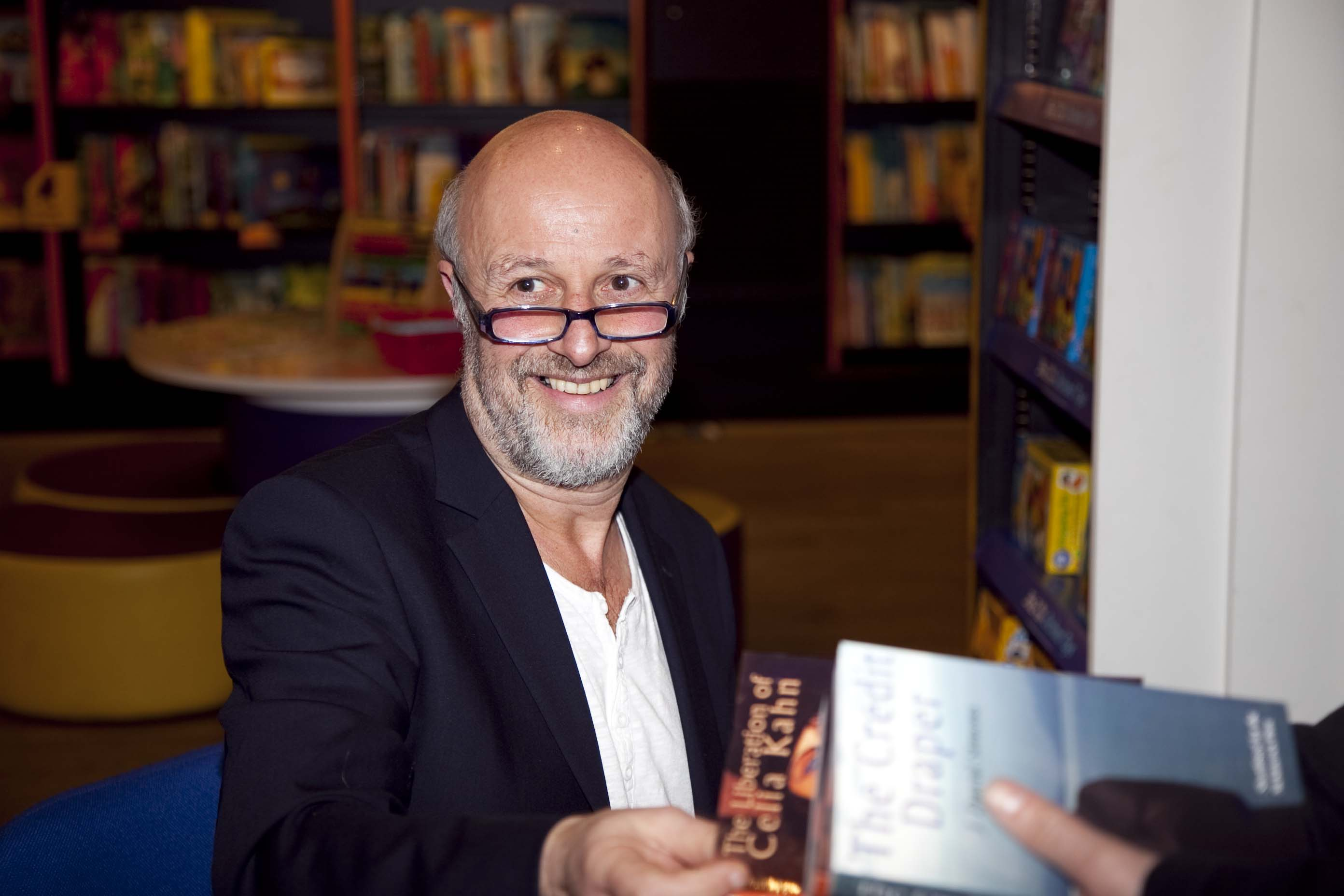
- J. David Simons in 2011
- Born: Jonathan David Simons; 27 August 1953 (age 73); Glasgow, Scotland
- Website: www.jdavidsimons.com

J. David Simons (born 27 August 1953) is a Scottish novelist and short story writer. He was educated at Hutchesons' Boys Grammar School and graduated with a law degree from Glasgow University in 1973. He has been a partner with an Edinburgh law firm, a cotton farmer on Kibbutz Ashdot Ya'akov Ichud in Israel, a charity administrator for the Cyrenians in West London, a university lecturer at Keio University, Japan, and a journalist for multi-national publishing house Informa.

Apart from his fiction writing, Simons is also an editor with the Blue Pencil literary agency and a media journalist with the global technology consultancy firm, Omdia (formerly Ovum). Since October 2017, he has lived as a digital nomad – travelling, writing and working around the world. He is currently resident in Javea, Spain.

== Literary career ==
Simons' first novel, The Credit Draper, was published by Two Ravens Press in May 2008, and was shortlisted for the McKitterick Prize in June 2009. This novel is set primarily within the Glasgow Jewish Community in the early part of the 20th century, and represents the first part of his "Glasgow to Galilee" trilogy. Simons goes on to tackle issues of socialism, feminism and birth control in Glasgow during the 1920s in his second novel in this trilogy, The Liberation of Celia Kahn, which was published by Five Leaves Publications in February 2011, along with a re-print of The Credit Draper. His third novel, An Exquisite Sense of What is Beautiful, set in Japan, was published by Saraband in March 2013, and examines the theme of denial, especially in regard to the dropping of the atomic bombs on Hiroshima and Nagasaki by the United States.

In The Land Agent, the third novel in the "Glasgow to Galilee" trilogy, published by Saraband in October 2014, Simons turns his attention to 1920s Palestine and the conflict over a strategic piece of land that does not exist on any map. Simons' fifth novel, A Woman of Integrity, was originally published in March 2017 by Freight, before its rights were acquired by Saraband. The novel deals with the lives of two film actresses from different eras trying to carve out careers for themselves away from the shadows of men. In his sixth novel, The Responsibility of Love published by BackPage Press, Simons explores the theme as to whether a person is forever responsible for those he/she has tamed.

Simons' latest novel is The Interview published by Saraband in August 2024. Ostensibly the story of the demise of a US talk show host from the heights of fame, the essential theme is not only about speaking truth to power but also about speaking truth to oneself.

== Awards and grants ==
- Robert Louis Stevenson Fellowship, June 2011.
- Talent Development Award - Creative Scotland, March 2013.
- Open Project Funding Award - Creative Scotland, July 2015.

== Published work ==
=== Novels ===
- The Credit Draper (Two Ravens Press 2008, re-printed Five Leaves 2011, re-printed Saraband 2014)
- The Liberation of Celia Kahn (Five Leaves 2011, reprinted Saraband 2014)
- An Exquisite Sense of What is Beautiful (Saraband 2013)
- The Land Agent (Saraband 2014)
- A Woman of Integrity (Freight 2017, re-printed Saraband 2018)
- The Responsibility of Love (BackPage Press 2021)
- The Interview (Saraband 2024)

=== Short stories ===
- The Lovebirds (Printed Matter 1993)
- Soundscapes (Printed Matter 1995)
- Maimonides (London Magazine 2000)
- The Custodian (Gutter Magazine 2011)
- Poland 1919 - Decisions, Decisions (Spilling Ink 2011)
- Poland 1919 - Palestine or America (Glasgow University Press 2012)
- The Coffee Kid (runner-up in the Poetic Republic Short Story Competition 2015)
- The Myth of Bert Slater (Nutmeg Magazine Issue, No 2, 2017)
- Remember From Where You Came (With Their Best Clothes On, New Writing Scotland 36, 2018)
- The Responsibility of Love (Lakeview International Journal of Literature and Arts, 2019)
- The White Place (New Writing Scotland 39, Aug. 2021)
- The Business of Carrying (Gutter Magazine, Aug, 2021)
- The Waiter (Postbox Magazine, Red Squirrel Press, Autumn 2025)

=== Essays ===
- Kibbutz - The Golden Years (appearing in Utopia, Five Leaves 2012)
