= Scottie Wilson =

Scottish artist

- Born: Lewis Freeman; 28 February 1891; Glasgow, Scotland
- Died: 26 March 1972 (aged 81); London, England

Scottie Wilson (28 February 1891 – 26 March 1972), born Louis Freeman (birth certificate says Lewis), was a Scottish, Jewish, outsider artist known particularly for his highly detailed style. Starting his artistic career at the age of 44, his work was admired and collected by the likes of Jean Dubuffet and Pablo Picasso and is generally accepted to be in the forefront of 20th-century outsider art.

== Early years ==
Born in Glasgow, Scotland, at 24 Ropework Lane in what is now the Merchant City area. His father Julius worked as a fur skin dresser (furrier) who married his wife Esther in Riga (then in Russia and now Latvia) on 13 May 1878. He had 3 older brothers (Philip, Samuel & Morris), 2 older sisters (Sarah and Leah), 4 younger brothers (Charles/Levi, Joseph, David, Joseph - born after the first Joseph died) and 2 younger sisters (Dora and Betsy). Wilson (Freeman) dropped out of school at the age of 8 to help subsidise his family's meagre income by, amongst other things, selling newspapers on the street. In 1906 he enlisted with the Scottish Rifles and subsequently served in India and South Africa. He bought himself out in 1911 but rejoined in 1914 during World War I to fight on the Western Front. At the end of the war he emigrated to Toronto, Ontario, Canada, where he owned and operated a second-hand shop.

== Artistic career ==
=== Beginning ===
At the age of 44 he began doodling with one of the fountain pens that he collected for resale in his shop and discovered his passion for art. In his own words:

I’m listening to classical music one day – Mendelssohn – when all of a sudden I dipped the bulldog pen into a bottle of ink and started drawing – doodling I suppose you’d call it – on the cardboard tabletop. I don’t know why. I just did. In a couple of days – I worked almost ceaselessly – the whole of the tabletop was covered with little faces and designs. The pen seemed to make me draw, and them images, the faces and designs just flowed out. I couldn’t stop – I’ve never stopped since that day.

It was there that he began his work, embodying a personal code of morality wherein characters called "evils and greedies" are juxtaposed with naturalistic symbols of goodness and truth. The first dealer to encounter Wilson's work was a Canadian, Douglas Duncan, who displayed them in various gallery shows. While Wilson did not want to part with his drawings, he found the idea of an artistic career preferable to shopkeeping and attempted to solve the problem of raising money by staging travelling shows for viewing only and charging modest entrance fees or holding tray collections.

=== Success ===
After receiving recognition for his work in Toronto, he abruptly went to London in 1945 and continued to exhibit his drawings for modest fees while maintaining a deep distrust of dealers. A few months after his arrival he was persuaded by dealers to show in galleries, and had a solo exhibition at the Arcade Gallery in London, shown concurrently with other works by such 20th-century artists as Pablo Picasso, Giorgio de Chirico, Paul Klee, Joan Miró, amongst others. Wilson's rejection of commercialism was unabated, however, and he continued to sell his work on the street for a minute fraction of the prices the gallery owners were asking. He said of the working-class customers he attracted, "They're the intellect, you know".

=== Later years ===
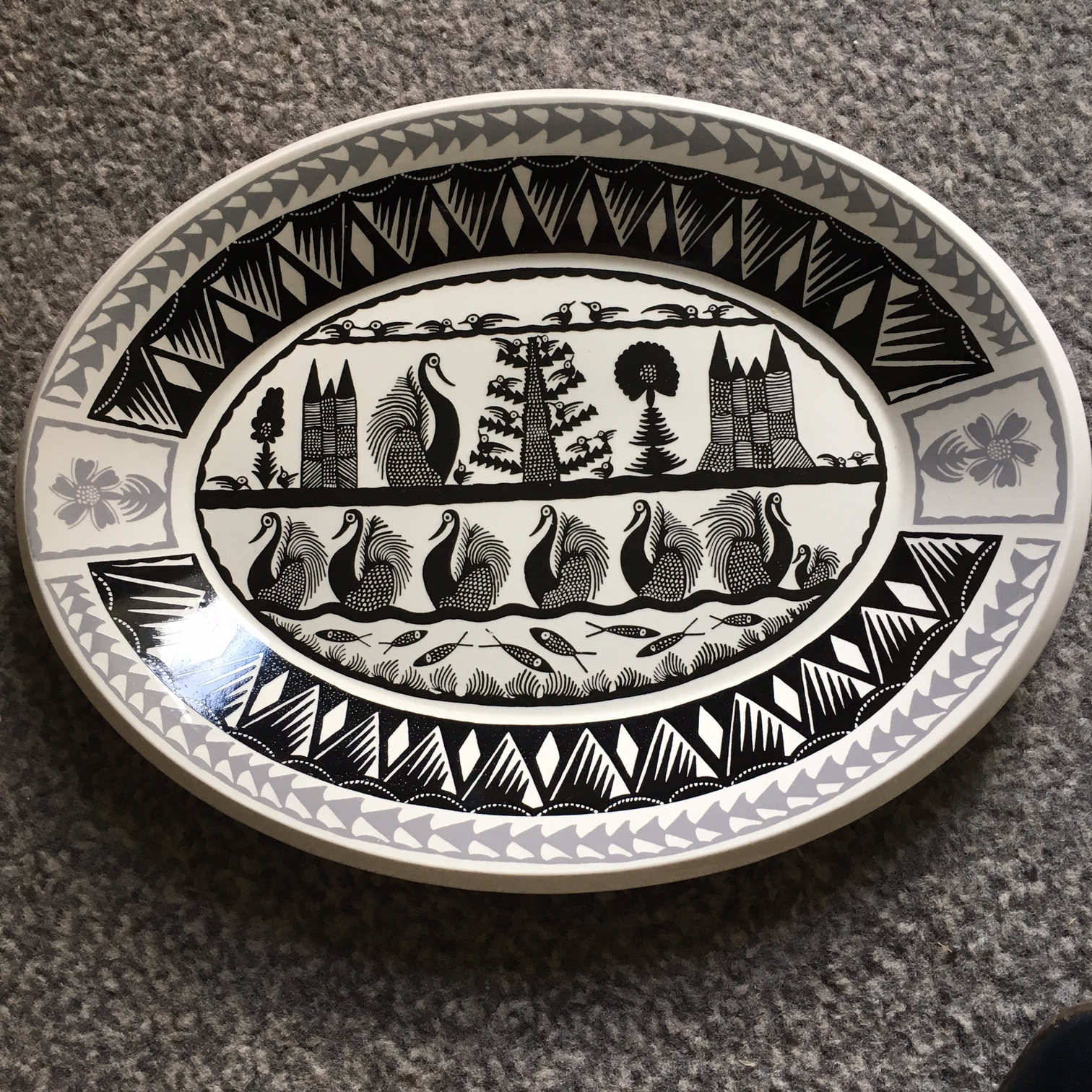
Royal Worcester dinnerware by Scottie Wilson

Wilson spent his remaining years in Kilburn, an area of northwest London, working alone in his small lodgings. In the early 1950s, he travelled to France at the persuasion of artist and outsider art fanatic Jean Dubuffet. There Wilson was met by not only Dubuffet, but also by Pablo Picasso; both were fans and owners of Wilson's work. According to art critic Bill Hopkins, a friend of Wilson who accompanied him on the trip:

When we arrived, not only was Dubuffet waiting, Pablo Picasso was with him. Both owned a few of Scottie’s pieces, and Picasso had come to see – and perhaps buy – some more. I vividly remember both artists eagerly admiring Scottie’s work, squabbling in their fierce, theatrical, Gallic voices over who would buy which piece.

In the 1960s, Wilson began to create paintings on plates and was subsequently commissioned by Royal Worcester and had designed a series of dinnerware, which was produced until 1965. The pattern was based on totem poles and imagery from North America. His picture ‘Bird Song’ was chosen as a design for the 1970 UNICEF Christmas Card. He died in 1972 from cancer. Though he always complained of poverty, Wilson was discovered at the time of his death to have secreted a suitcase full of money under his bed and large sums in various bank accounts.

His works are now part of the National Gallery of Canada in Ottawa, the Tate Britain in London, the Collection de l'Art Brut in Lausanne, the Museum of Everything in London, the Metropolitan Museum of Art in New York and the Zander Collection in Cologne, among others.

== Subject matter and style ==
The evolution of his style was notoriously non-existent and, because he did not date most of his works, it is very difficult to place his works in time apart from the few documentary records that exist. He stuck mainly to a narrow range of visual elements: botanical forms, birds and animals, clowns (self-portraits), and "Greedies" and "Evils" (malignant personifications). His work can be placed in a purely speculative chronological order by the subtle changes and progressions in his subject matter and style. His earlier pieces are thought to be generally more organic in composition and have less precise cross-hatching and detail. Certain images did become more prevalent, while others were used less frequently, and the level of detail is thought to have increased over time. As he once said:

When I'm working I can see what's happening, and I can imagine what's going to happen. I can see best when I'm finishing my pictures with a pen. When I'm making strokes; hundreds and thousands of strokes.

== Exhibitions (selection) ==
- 2025: Art Brut. Dans l’intimité d’une collection. Donation Decharme au Centre Pompidou, Grand Palais, Paris
- 2025 A Walk on the Wild Side: Artworks from the Collection de l’Art Brut and Elsewhere, Power Station of Art, Shangai, "
- 2025: The Meeting Place of Unveiled Worlds, Tokyo Shibuya Koen-dori Gallery, Museum of Contemporary Art Tokyo, Tokyo
- 2025: Exhibition 5 | Scottie Wilson, Zander Collection, Cologne
- 2024 Epopées Célestes, Villa Medici , Venice,'
- 2023: Faces, collection de l'art brut, Lausanne
- 2022: Art brut. Un dialogue singulier avec la Collection Würth. Museum Würth, Erstein
- 2022: Roger Cardinal Castles are Elsewhere. Turner Contemporary
- 2021: Frame Work collection de l'art brut, Lausanne,
- 2019: Art Brut in America : the Incursion of Jean Dubuffet, American Folk Art Museum, New York
- 2018: "Scottie Wilson", Gimpel Fils Gallery, Londres
- 2017: André Breton et l'art magique, Lille Métropole Musée d'art moderne, d'art contemporain et de l'art brut, Villeneuve d'Ascq
- 2016: 27 artists, 209 works, Zander Collection, Bönnigheim
- 2016: The Museum of Everything, Kunsthal Rotterdam, Rotterdam
- 2015: Architectures, collection de l'art brut, Lausanne,
- 2015: Art Brut. Collection abcd / Bruno Decharme. La Maison Rouge, Paris)
- 2011: Amicalement brut, collection Eternod-Mermod. Lille Métropole Musée d'art moderne, d'art contemporain et de l'art brut, Villeneuve d'Ascq
- 2011 Caboches. Galerie du marché, Lausanne,
- 2009: Approaching Abstraction, American Folk Art Museum, New York
- 2008: Glossolalia: Languages of Drawing, Museum of Modern Art, New York
- 2005: Outsider Art, Tate Britain, London
- 2001 Eternity has no door of Escape, collection Eternod-Mermod. Galleria dell Gottardo, Lausanne
- 2001:Solitärer. Sarlingskonst fran Samling Eternod - Mermod. Kunstmuseum Malmö, Malmö,
- 2000: Outsider Art. Collection Charlotte Zander, Zander Collection|Museum Charlotte Zander, Bönnigheim
- 2000: Making Choices, Museum of Modern Art, New York
- 2000: Solitaire, the Art Brut Collection of Philippe Eternod and Jean-David Mermod, Museum Waldemarsudde, Stockholm,
- 1998: Art Unsolved The Musgrave Kinley Outsider Art Collection, Irish Museum of Modern Art, Dublin, 1998
- 1998: Figure dell’anima. Arte irregolare in Europa, Castello Visconteo, Pavie
- 1998: Figure dell’anima. Arte irregolare in Europa, Palazzo Ducale, Gênes
- 1997: Musée de la Création Franche, "collection Eternod-Mermod", Bègles-Bordeaux
- 1993: Parallel Visions, Setagaya Art Museum, Tokyo,
- 1993: Visones Paralelas, Museo National Reina Sofia, Madrid
- 1993: Parallel Visions, Kunsthalle, Basel
- 1992: Parallel Visions, Los Angeles County Museum, Los Angeles,
- 1986: Dubuffet & Art Brut, Peggy Guggenheim Collection, Venice
- 1981: Paris–Paris 1937–1957. Créations en France, Centre Pompidou, Paris
- 1977: Scottie, Collection de l'Art Brut, Lausanne
- 1969: Naive Kunst aus rheinischem Privatbesitz, Städtische Kunstsammlungen Bonn, Bonn
- 1950: Aspects of British Art, Institute of Contemporary Art, London
- 1950: Gimpel Fils, Londres
