= Charles Frank Ltd =

- Company type: Optical & scientific instrument maker
- Industry: Scientific instruments
- Founded: Glasgow, Scotland (ca. 1915)
- Headquarters: 67 Saltmarket Glasgow, Scotland
- Key people: Charles Frank, (Founder); Arthur Frank (Son); Morris Frank (Son)
- Products: Precision binoculars, telescopes, microscopes, cameras and other optical equipment.

Charles Frank Ltd (ca. 1915 – 1974) was an optical and scientific instrument maker in Glasgow, Scotland.

== History ==
Charles Frank Ltd was formed in circa 1907 when Lithuanian immigrant Charles Frank opened a shop at 67, Saltmarket, where he designed, sold, and repaired photographic and scientific apparatus. Over the following half century it was to become one of the best-known photographic centers in the city and a byword for excellence in cameras and watches. At some later stage the business expanded into a second premises located in the Glasgow city centre on Queen Street. This established a more upmarket showroom for the sale of his scientific instruments. The basement of this location also held an expansive collection of antique microscopes, which was viewable by request to Arthur Frank, a son of Charles and now in charge of the business. During the Second World War, the firm focused on the manufacture of navigational instruments and binoculars for the British war effort.

The post war boom in consumer spending coincided in a growth in interest in astronomy. The business boomed through the 1950s and early 1960s. At the end of the war the market was flooded with high quality ex-military optical and photographic equipment. Charles Frank Ltd took advantage of this ready supply by buying these goods at public auctions held when no longer needed by the military and reselling them to the public. Throughout Charles Frank Ltd maintained their strong reputation for quality.

In the ten years from the middle of the 1960s the company was undercut by new entrants into the marketplace. Despite this the company was determined to continue to uphold its reputation as a quality manufacturer. Unfortunately Charles Frank Ltd lost market share and in the poor economic climate of the 1970s Britain finally ceased trading in 1974.

== Legacy ==
Instruments manufactured by Charles Frank Ltd are still in daily use today and regularly appear on the second hand market. Two books on astronomy published by the company have been the launchpad for many amateur and professional science careers.

After the original Charles Frank Ltd ceased trading and the business was sold off, the rights to the name were acquired by former staff. For some time the new company traded from 101 Rose Street Edinburgh as a retail and wholesale seller of binoculars and telescopes but the premises are now an outlet of Viking Optical.

== See also ==
- Three-day week
- Frank's Book of the Telescope Published by Charles Frank Ltd
- The Stars Above Us Author Sir Harold Spencer Jones, Published by Charles Frank Ltd
