= Abraham Goldberg =

British medical professor

Sir Abraham Goldberg
- Born: 7 December 1923; Edinburgh, Scotland
- Died: 1 September 2007 (aged 83)
- Known for: World Authority on porphyria, and a leading expert on lead poisoning
- Awards: KBE, MD, DSc FRCP, FRSE
- Scientific career
- Fields: Clinical pharmacology, therapeutics and toxicology

Sir Abraham Goldberg KBE FRCP FRCPGlas FRSE (7 December 1923 – 1 September 2007) was a British physician who was a Regius Professor of the Practice of Medicine at the University of Glasgow. He was educated at George Heriot's School in Edinburgh and the University of Edinburgh.

== Early life ==
Sir Abraham (Abe) Goldberg was born in Edinburgh on 7 December 1923, the youngest of five children of Ashkenazi Jewish émigrés of Lithuanian-Jewish and Ukrainian-Jewish origins.

== Career ==
After junior hospital medical posts and national service with the Royal Army Medical Corps in Egypt, Goldberg obtained a Nuffield fellowship in the Department of Chemical Pathology at University College Hospital, London. Here he worked with the Professor of Chemical Pathology, Claude Rimmington, in learning the techniques which were to underpin his future research studies on the blood pigment haem and its relation to the disease porphyria. After a year and a half spent on an Eli Lilly travelling fellowship in Salt Lake City with the haematologist Max Wintrobe,

Goldberg returned to Scotland in 1956. He obtained his MD from the University of Edinburgh at this time, with his thesis Acute intermittent porphyria, and began working as a lecturer in medicine in the Department of Medicine of the University of Glasgow, where he was to spend the remainder of his professional career.

The mid-1960s saw him being awarded DSc and securing a Personal Chair in the Department of Medicine, Western Infirmary, University of Glasgow. As editor of the Scottish Medical Journal in 1962-63, he presided over the initiation of a special series on Scottish medical education which was published in book form in April 1963. Subsequent to this, over the next 20 years, he made contributions to the development of medical education through, for example, the production of a bedside teaching manual for medical students (known as "the green book"), the production of a clinical examination slide-tape series (with Albert Yeung), and a major paper on the future of Scottish medical education in the Health Bulletin, in addition to his bedside teaching, lectures and supervision of students undertaking postgraduate degrees.

He became a world authority on porphyria, and a leading expert on lead poisoning, being influential in improving the safety of the water supply to Glasgow. He was appointed to the Regius Chair of Materia Medica, Stobhill Hospital in 1970, succeeding Stanley Alstead. He built up the Department of Materia Medica and supervised Brian Whiting, later to be Dean of the Faculty of Medicine, in the development of a drug interaction disc which ultimately was distributed to all practising doctors in the UK.

This activity, together with other work on pharmacodynamics, laid the foundation for later achievements including the chairmanship of the Committee on the Safety of Medicines and the Founding Presidency of the Faculty of Pharmaceutical Medicine of the Royal Colleges of Physicians of the UK. His work on lead poisoning, an interest of his in the 1960s, continued while at Stobhill Hospital and he was an influential figure in promoting a safer, lead-free water supply to the people of Glasgow. In 1974, he was responsible for establishing the West of Scotland Alcohol Research Group; he was interested in research associated with alcohol and, indeed, he was also a former member of the Scottish Council on Alcoholism.

In 1978, following the death of Graeme Wilson, he was appointed to the Regius Chair of the Practice of Medicine, Western Infirmary, Glasgow. A year later he was invited to chair the UK Government's Committee on the Safety of Medicines.

In 1982, he was knighted for services to medicine.

== Personal life ==
He married Clarice Cussin in 1957, with whom he had three children; Richard (Professor of Law at Durham University), David (Professor of Public Health at Glasgow Caledonian University) and Jennifer.
