= Philip Caplan, Lord Caplan =

British lawyer and judge

Philip Isaac Caplan, Lord Caplan, FRPS AFIAP (24 February 1929 – 7 November 2008) was a British lawyer and judge. He was a Senator of the College of Justice in Scotland from 1989 to 2000.

Caplan was born into a Jewish family in Glasgow, the only son of businessman Hyman Caplan and his wife, Rosalena Caplan. He was educated at Eastwood High School and the University of Glasgow. He was a solicitor between 1952 and 1956, before being called to the bar in 1957. He became a Queen's Counsel in 1970.

He was appointed Sheriff of Lothian and Borders in 1979, then Sheriff Principal of North Strathclyde in 1983. In 1989, he was appointed a Senator of the College of Justice, taking the title Lord Caplan. He sat both the Outer and Inner House, and retired in 2000. During his tenure, Caplan was one of the two Jewish judges on the Scottish High Court bench, alongside Hazel Cosgrove, Lady Cosgrove.

As a judge, Caplan presided over what was then Scotland’s longest civil trial, which ran for 391 days, arising from the Piper Alpha disaster. In a 1997 judgment of around 1,500 pages, he held that the immediate cause of the initial explosion involved human error by two platform workers who were killed in the accident. This conclusion differed from the earlier public inquiry led by Lord Cullen, which focused on the operator’s safety management and systems. One of the workers was posthumously awarded the Queen’s Commendation for Bravery.

Caplan was also a noted photographer.
