= Ralph Glasser =

British writer (1916–2002)

Ralph Glasser (3 April 1916 – 6 March 2002) was a Scottish psychologist, economist, advisor to developing countries and author of a highly praised autobiographical quartet.

== Early life ==
Glasser was born of Jewish parents in Leeds, but when he was only a few months old his family moved to a tenement flat in the Gorbals area of Glasgow, which had gained notoriety as one of the biggest slums in Europe. His mother died when he was six and his two older sisters quickly decamped, leaving him to be raised alone by his father, who had a gambling addiction.

"The streets were slippery with refuse and often with drunken vomit. It was a place of grime and poverty...The Victorian building, in red sandstone blackened by smoke... was in decay. Splintered and broken floorboards sometimes gave way under your feet. Interior walls carried patches of stain from a long succession of burst pipes. Rats and mice moved about freely...."

The kind of housing Glasser describes survived until the 1960s. Glasser recalled the "recurrent struggle on the frontier of survival: mutuality and the informal economy".

Displaying a precocious intellect, Glasser studied the Theory of Relativity as a boy and attended a lecture by Albert Einstein when he was thirteen. Family circumstances meant that he could not pursue academic studies and he went to work first as a "soap boy" for a barber then as a presser in a garment factory. In his spare time he studied at the Mitchell Library in Glasgow. He attended socialist camps but retained throughout his life a sceptical outlook about politically constructed utopias.

== Oxford ==
Glasser continued his studies and in the late 1930s won a scholarship to Oxford. His response to one of the set questions "Has science increased human happiness?" was an emphatic "No." He cycled more than 300 miles (480 kilometres) to Oxford wearing a pair of khaki shorts. He first attended Ruskin College, then moved to Magdalen College, where he read Philosophy, Politics and Economics. He described the difficulties people had relating to a working-class student:

"In pre-war days for a Gorbals man to come up to Oxford was unthinkable as to meet a raw bushman in the St James club, something for which there were no stock responses. In any case for a member of the boss class, someone from the Gorbals was in effect a bushman, the Gorbals itself as distant and unknowable as the Kalahari Desert".

He tended to hide the fact that he was Jewish, in view of the prejudice prevailing in the society of his day, which "burdened every step of our lives" and resulted in the need "to bury it beneath some protective colouring, so that we might go our private ways like everybody else".

At Oxford Philip Toynbee tried unsuccessfully to recruit him to the Communist Party. After serving in the Second World War he resumed his studies, and met such celebrities of the time as Victor Gollancz, whose daughter he dated for a while, and Harold Laski.

== Post-war years ==
Glasser took another degree in economics at the London School of Economics and began work in public relations, the British Council and advisory roles for Asian and African governments. He met many famous people as his horizons expanded but he felt "the Gorbals at my shoulder always, like the Hound of Heaven". He moved for a time to a village in Italy which resulted in a book, The Net and the Quest and a documentary by the BBC. On the Council of Christians and Jews he worked with Father Tom Corbishley and Hugo Gryn.

== Autobiography ==
Growing Up in the Gorbals, the first volume of his highly praised autobiographical trilogy, was published in 1986. It was followed by Gorbals Boy at Oxford in 1988 and Gorbals Voices, Siren Songs in 1990. In his last book, Gorbals Legacy (2000), he looked back again at how his "Faustian Familiar" had moulded and influenced his path through life.

== Personal life ==
In 1965, he married the literary agent Jacqueline Korn. They had two children: Roland Glasser (1973), a literary translator from French; and Miranda Glasser (1975), a TV producer.

== Works ==
- The New High Priesthood: The Social, Ethical and Political Implications of a Marketing-Orientated Society, Macmillan, 1967
- Planned Marketing: Policy for Business Growth, Macmillan, 1968, ISBN 978-0-330-02156-2
- A Nice Jewish Boy, Robert Hale, 1968
- Leisure – Penalty Or Prize?, Macmillan, 1970, ISBN 0-333-06405-4
- The Net and the Quest: Patterns of Community and How They Can Survive Progress, Temple Smith, 1977, ISBN 0-85117-124-9
- Scenes from a Highland Life, Hodder & Stoughton, ISBN 0-340-25564-1
- Town Hall: Local Government at Work in Britain Today, Century, 1984, ISBN 978-0-7126-0317-1
- Growing Up in the Gorbals, Chatto & Windus, 1986
- Gorbals Boy at Oxford, Chatto & Windus, 1988, ISBN 0-7011-3185-3
- Gorbals Voices, Siren Songs, Chatto & Windus, 1990
- The Far Side of Desire, Severn House Publishers, 1994, ISBN 978-0-7278-4678-5
- A Gorbals Legacy, Mainstream, 2000, ISBN 1-84018-336-5
