= A C Jacobs =

Scottish poet

AC Jacobs
- Born: 30 May 1937; Glasgow, Scotland
- Died: 17 March 1994 (aged 56); Madrid, Spain
- Known for: Scottish poet

A. C. Jacobs (Arthur C. Jacobs) was a Scottish poet, born in Glasgow in 1937, he died in Madrid in 1994.

Jacobs was Jewish, wrote in Yiddish and English, and was a gifted translator of Hebrew.

Jacobs grew up in a traditional Jewish family who were immigrants from Lithuania. He studied at the University of Glasgow with Philip Hobsbaum and his early work was published in the Leeds magazine Stand by Jon Silkin.

Jacobs' poetry is described as exploring questions of nationality and language.

In his obituary, his editor Anthony Rudolf said: "Many of Jacobs's poems celebrate Jewish life or honour Jewish death, sometimes with a tartan tinge" and in a collection of poems highlighted "his complex cultural identity as a Jew in Scotland, as a Scot in England, and as a diaspora Jew in Israel, Italy, Spain and the UK". He variously used his un-Jewish name Arthur, his adopted Hebrew name, Chaim, signing himself as Arthur C. and A. C. Jacobs.
