= Jack Ronder =

Scottish screenwriter and author

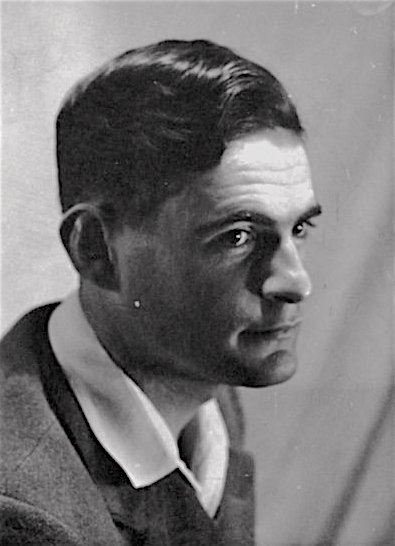
- Born: 1926; Dundee, Scotland
- Died: 9 December 1979 (aged 53); London, England
- Occupations: Screenwriter, author
- Years active: 1948–1979
- Notable work: The Lost Tribe, Survivors

Jack Ronder was a Scottish dramatist, screenwriter and author who in the 1950s and 1960s was known for his socially acute plays before becoming a TV screenwriter. He is remembered for his work on Terry Nation's seminal BBC post-apocalyptic series, Survivors, which was listed by SFX magazine as one of the 'Top 50 British Telefantasy Shows'.

== Life ==
Jack Tobias Ronder was the grandson of Lithuanian Jews who fled their homeland in 1885 due to persecution in Tsarist Russia. Believing themselves to have bought tickets to America, the family were made to disembark in Dundee, Scotland where they settled and he was born. Their story inspired Ronder's first book and a BBC TV series, The Lost Tribe, the story of the establishment of Jewish community in Edinburgh and Glasgow.

Ronder initially studied chemistry at Heriot-Watt College, Edinburgh, where he involved himself in a number of productions with the Edinburgh University Drama Society and Edinburgh Graduates Theatre Group, going on to become a chemistry teacher before a full-time writer. In 1961, he had his first West End play produced, called 'This Year, Next Year', at the Vaudeville Theatre. He went on to write the first one man play for Russell Hunter, one of Scotland's most talented and versatile actors, called Cocky, about Lord Cockburn in 1969. He was a member of the Writers' Guild of Great Britain's committee.

Ronder married Scottish artist Anne Christie, and had three children, one of whom is actress and playwright Tanya Ronder.

== Works ==
=== Books ===
- The Lost Tribe (1978)

=== TV Series ===
- The Lost Tribe (1980)
- Scene (1980)
- Going to Work (1978–1979)
- Scottish Playbill (1970)
- The Day After Yesterday (1979)
- Space: 1999 (1976)
- Hunter's Walk (1976)
- Survivors (1975–1976)
- Z Cars (1975)
- Barlow (1974–1975)
- John Halifax, Gentleman (1974)
- Hadleigh (1973)
- The Regiment (1973)
- Late Night Theatre (1972)
- The Lotus Eaters (1972)
- ITV Sunday Night Theatre (1972)
- A Summer Story (1972)
- A Family at War (1971)
- Dr. Finlay's Casebook (1969)
- The Borderers (1969)
- This Man Craig (1966–1967)

=== Plays ===
- The Sinner's Tale (1971)
- Confessions of a Justified Sinner (1971)
- Cocky (1969)
- Who'll Do It This Time? (1969)
- This Year, Next Year (1961)
- Wedding Day (1959)
- The Daughter of the Dawn (1955)
- Who Loves Morag? (1954)
- Maria Marten (or Murder in the Red Barn) (1954)
- Philotus (1953)
- A Heavenly Sound: A Comedy in Three Acts (1950)
