= Hannah Frank =

Scottish artist (1908–2008)

- Born: 23 August 1908; Glasgow, Scotland
- Died: 18 December 2008 (aged 100); Glasgow, Scotland
- Education: University of Glasgow; Glasgow School of Art
- Known for: sculpture, drawing
- Movement: Art Nouveau
- Spouse: Lionel Levy
- Awards: James McBey prize, Glasgow School of Art

Hannah Frank (23 August 1908 – 18 December 2008) was a Scottish artist and sculptor from Glasgow. She was known for her Art Nouveau monochrome drawings until she decided to concentrate on sculpture in 1952.

== Background and education ==
Frank's Jewish parents both originated in Russia. Charles Fraiker, her father, came from Vilkomir in the Russian Pale of Settlement. After studying engineering at Leitz in Frankfurt, he immigrated to Scotland in 1905, and changed his name to Frank. Frank's mother was also born in Russia, as Miriam Lipctz. Having immigrated to Scotland, her family settled first in Edinburgh and then in Glasgow, where her parents ran a shop in Gorbals repairing cameras and optical devices.

The Franks lived in Glasgow's Gorbals district, where there was a strong Jewish immigrant community, first in Abbotsford Road and later in South Portland Street. When Frank was 13, the family moved to 72 Dixon Avenue, in Crosshill.

Frank attended Abbotsford Road Primary School followed by Strathbungo School and then Albert Road Academy. She obtained her Intermediate Certificate in 1924 (with subject passes in English, Maths, Latin, French, Science and Drawing). Her Higher Certificate followed in 1926 (English Literature and History, Latin, French and Art).

Frank was a student at the University of Glasgow in 1926–27, 1928–29 and 1929–30, taking courses in Latin, English, French, Moral Philosophy and Botany, living at home during her periods of study. In the session 1927–28 she attended Skerry's College, studying German, where she was assessed as 'having a rare talent for languages'. Although she had to negotiate several re-sits, she graduated Master of Arts on 8 November 1930. Her formal essays, notebooks and examination scripts can be viewed in the University Archives.

While at the university, she participated in Glasgow University Jewish Society rambles and in its Zionist Branch meetings and studies. She contributed poems and illustrations to the Glasgow University Magazine. Its index for May 1929 reveals "Al Aaraaf" to be her pen name. The name was taken from a poem, by Edgar Allan Poe, about a star named by the Danish astronomer Tycho Brahe which "....shone as bright as Jupiter and Venus for a few nights and was never seen again."

By 1929, Gilbert Highet, the editor of GUM, had moved to Oxford and had become involved with The University News, in which he unsuccessfully attempted to have published two of Frank's illustrations, Red Flowers and Sorcery. The former was deemed to be of such high quality as to command a price that the University News could not afford. Highet himself bought Sorcery for 25/- and had it framed, remarking in correspondence with Frank, that he thought this drawing 'underpriced'. Somnia and Vana Spes were also enthusiastically received, but not published as the magazine, intended as a commercial venture, ran into publishing problems.

Frank continued to illustrate the GUM after graduating. After university, Frank qualified as a teacher at Jordanhill Teacher Training College. She also undertook part-time study at the Glasgow School of Art (GSA) for several years, taking the General Course in sessions 27/28 and 28/29, and courses in Design (29/30) and Drawing and Painting (31/32 and 32/33). Her teachers in the latter included Dugdale, Keppie, Richmond, Gauld, Whitelaw Hamilton, Anningbell, Forrester Wilson and Gray. She may also have taken Calligraphy. Frank won the GSA evening class prize in 1929 for Sorcery (the drawing that was bought by the former editor of GUM) and the James McBey prize for wood engraving in 1934. She attended further courses at the GSA in 35/36, 37/39 and 43/66.

In 1939, Frank married Lionel Levy. Her works during the years of the World War II were reflective of the mood of the time, as a Jew, and with brothers in the British Army these years were long and dark, and there were many illustrations of grim, gaunt figures, reflecting the plight of the refugees. It was also during this period that Frank began clay modelling at the Glasgow School of Art under Paul Zunterstein and Benno Schotz who encouraged her work, and sculpture became her main passion.

== Early life ==
Although she had works published in the Glasgow University Magazine which brought with it involvement with the wider university community, during her later career, Frank's work was to reach a wide audience including many in Glasgow's Jewish community where she received many appeals to donate art to help with fundraising appeals. This involvement can be characterised by focusing on the years between 1948 and 1969, in which Frank either donated or lent her artwork for charitable and fundraising purposes for Jewish organisations. Throughout her career, Frank assisted in any areas possible to help various organisations raise money, whether this was designing brochures or lending her work to help fundraise. Frank and her husband Lionel Levy were also members of the Glasgow committee of the Friends of the Hebrew University. This connection with the Jewish community would be something that would span out over most of Frank's career and later life. Below are five examples ranging between the years 1948 and 1985 which convey Frank's enthusiastic approach to assisting Jewish organisations.

In 1948, Frank designed a brochure cover for the Glasgow Board for Jewish Education, which was the main centre for Jewish education in Glasgow at the time. This brochure design coincided with the 50th Jubilee of the Talmud Torah (Letter 2/3/7, from Mr L. Friedlander to Mrs L. Levy, 19 September 1948, Hannah Frank & Lionel Levy Collection, Scottish Jewish Archives Centre).

In 1966, Frank donated an art piece to the Rosa Wollstein group which was to be used in an art draw in May of that year. The Rosal Wollstein was a women-run Glasgow branch that belonged to the Women's International Zionist Organisation, whose aim was to raise money for projects such as Israeli orphanages (Letter 2/3/9, from Mrs D. N. Links to Mrs L. Levy, 26 March 1966, Hannah Frank & Lionel Levy Collection, Scottish Jewish Archives Centre).

In 1967, Frank gave a sculpture to the Joint Israel Appeal which was collecting for an Israel emergency fund. The organisation held a Fine Art auction to which Frank donated. Ethel Collins and Louis Ferrar of the appeal wrote to Frank and gave expansive thanks for her donation (Letter 2/3/11, from Ms Ethel Collins & Mr Louis Ferrar, 28 November 1967, Hannah Frank & Lionel Levy Collection, Scottish Jewish Archives Centre).

In 1969, Frank donated a signed print to the Glasgow Women's Zionist Organisation's Jewish Art Group, which was auctioned to presumably raise money (Letter 2/3/28, from Mrs J. Lewis to Mrs L. Levy, 14 December 1969, Hannah Frank & Lionel Levy Collection, Scottish Jewish Archives Centre).

Frank and her husband Lionel were members of the Glasgow group of the Friends of the Hebrew University of Jerusalem. In 1985, Frank donated a piece to the group that would be placed into a raffle, the raffle itself raised around £700.

== Later life ==
In the latter half of Frank's life her artistic practice lay in the production of sculpture (with the latest drawings dated 1952) following her enrolment in sculpture classes at the Glasgow School of Art. The small scale plaster, terra cotta and bronze sculptures are mainly figure studies. Many of these sculptures focus on the form of women, a subject she found more interesting to work with, which is evident in her drawings too. Frank's style was influenced by contemporaries such as Henry Moore as well as her teachers at the Glasgow School of Art (Benno Schotz and Paul Zunterstein) but her personal style is undoubtedly distinct with elongated limbs and elegant shaping, with her roots in the Scottish Art Nouveau and Arts and Crafts movement.

Following an exhibition in 1969 at her brother's premises in Forrest Road, prints began to be made to satisfy the demand and interest in her work. In 1983 a retrospective exhibition took place in Glasgow, which was soon followed by the first edition of Hannah Frank, Drawings and Sculptures in 1988, published by Arthur Frank.

The Scottish Jewish Archives Centre holds a large collection of Frank's diaries and correspondences with various institutions. Her university notebooks and some correspondence is also held at the University of Glasgow's Archives. She also gifted two works on paper and one sculpture to Hunterian Museum and Art Gallery.

From 25 April – 5 June 2004 the Lancaster City Museum and Art Gallery hosted the first show of the successful touring exhibition: Hannah Frank: A Glasgow Artist. This toured for five years in the run up to Frank's 100th birthday, which coincided with the exhibition's final destination, her alma mater, the University of Glasgow. As part of this touring exhibition, Frank had her first solo exhibition in London at Ivy House, Golders Green, home to the London Jewish Cultural Centre. At the end of the London show Frank presented her 1943 drawing Sun to the Ben Uri London Jewish Museum of Art. Although she was not able to be there, due to travelling difficulties at the age of 98, she said that she was 'glad that people in London are becoming as enthusiastic about my work as they are in Scotland'. She was present at the opening of the final exhibition of the tour, at the University of Glasgow Chapel, where she was given a standing ovation by the 150 guests present.

The University of Glasgow recognised Frank's talent and "international distinction" and the day before her death (too late for her to know) a letter had been sent, offering her an honorary degree of Doctor of Letters. Frank's legacy lives on through her art, which proves to be an endless joy for her admirers, with exhibitions in Glasgow in 2011 and 2012, in two locations in Shetland in 2012 and 2013, an exhibition in Dalbeattie in 2013, and an exhibition in Ayr in 2014.

== Art ==
Frank's drawings imply a melancholic interpretation, not least created by the black and white contrast. The influences of artists such as the McDonald sisters, Jessie King, Aubrey Beardsley, Harry Clark and John Duncan can be seen in her work. However, her work maintains her own, distinctive style. Her drawings seem vibrant through the extreme colour contrast and clear but simple lines. Looking at the drawings more carefully, they differ enormously: some are melancholic and mystic, others bright and optimistic and others again calm. Most of her drawings date from between 1925 and 1952. While developing her drawing techniques and skills the shift of the content went on portraying females. According to an interview she gave whilst living in West Acres care home she claimed that women are simply more aesthetic and nicer to draw and, as an artist, she was more interested in capturing this.

Her drawings could be categorised in two sections according to a change in style. The first section would be from 1925 till 1934. By looking at e.g."Isabella or the Pot of Basil" (1928) one discovers an intense focus on details. The black and white contrast and the horizontal and vertical lines create a dynamic atmosphere and dramatise the scene with simple methods. The details, such as the skull in the vase, the basil itself or the ornaments surrounding the drawing are typical for this period of her drawings. Most of her drawings within this period are based on poetic interpretation; some of the poems she wrote and published herself.

Artist Ann Marie Foster said, "What a find! Hannah captures an essence with such economy of line. They are evidence of her drawing skill and technical facility and demonstrate the draftsman/womanship underpinning the black and white line drawings".

The next period is from roughly 1939 until 1952. There is a noticeable shift towards a brighter composition; white is the dominating colour. The figures are mainly women and Frank drew numerous face close-ups. The style is simpler and she drifts away from trying to draw realistic features, a trend typical of the art nouveau movement. Details in her drawings are of natural origin such as flowers, trees, animals and the sun/moon. Examples are "Sun" (1943), "Spring Frieze" (1945) or several of her "Girl at the Window" (1945, 1946, 1952) drawings.

In 1952 she started working on sculptures, originally to improve her anatomy skills for her drawings. However, she never returned to drawing but remained working on sculptures for almost the rest of her life till 1998, aged 90. She became widely recognised as her sculptures were exhibited in the Royal Scottish Academy, the Royal Glasgow Institute and the Royal Academy, in London. One example is "Head" (Bobby Rosenberg, 1952); this was only her second sculpture, her cousin Bobby the model. He recalls that it took her weeks to finish. Although sculptures mark a different artistic branch from drawings even here you can find a simplistic style combined with a striking aliveness. As in her drawings, the vast majority of her sculptures are female figures. Although her sculptures of heads seem detailed, they differ from works forming a whole human body where the figures remain faceless; an indicator of her focus on body anatomy. One of her most well known figures, "Reclining Woman" (1963) won her much attention. Although her first intention was to learn anatomic details, her work shifts again from realistic portrayals to experiments with surreal proportions: examples are another drawing entitled “Reclining Woman” (1964) and “Untitled” (1968).

“ I did sculpture classes because I didn't know anatomy. I thought it would be good for my drawing – then sculpture took over. I was fortunate to have Benno Schotz as a mentor".

While at the Glasgow School of Art, she won the James McBey Prize for wood engraving. Although some wood engravings, family portraits and sketches survive, her main early artistic focus was on her black and white drawings and, later, on her sculpture.

Frank lived in a care home near Glasgow in her later years. She is buried in Cathcart Cemetery, Cathcart, Glasgow.

== Archives ==
The archives relating to Frank are maintained by the Archives of the University of Glasgow (GUAS) and the Scottish Jewish Archives Centre and the Archives of the Glasgow School of Art.

== See also ==
- Glasgow Style
- Margaret MacDonald
- Aubrey Beardsley
- Jessie M King
- Royal Glasgow Institute of the Fine Arts
- Royal Scottish Academy
- Charles Frank Ltd
