= Tracts for the Times =

Series of theological writings by the English Oxford Movement

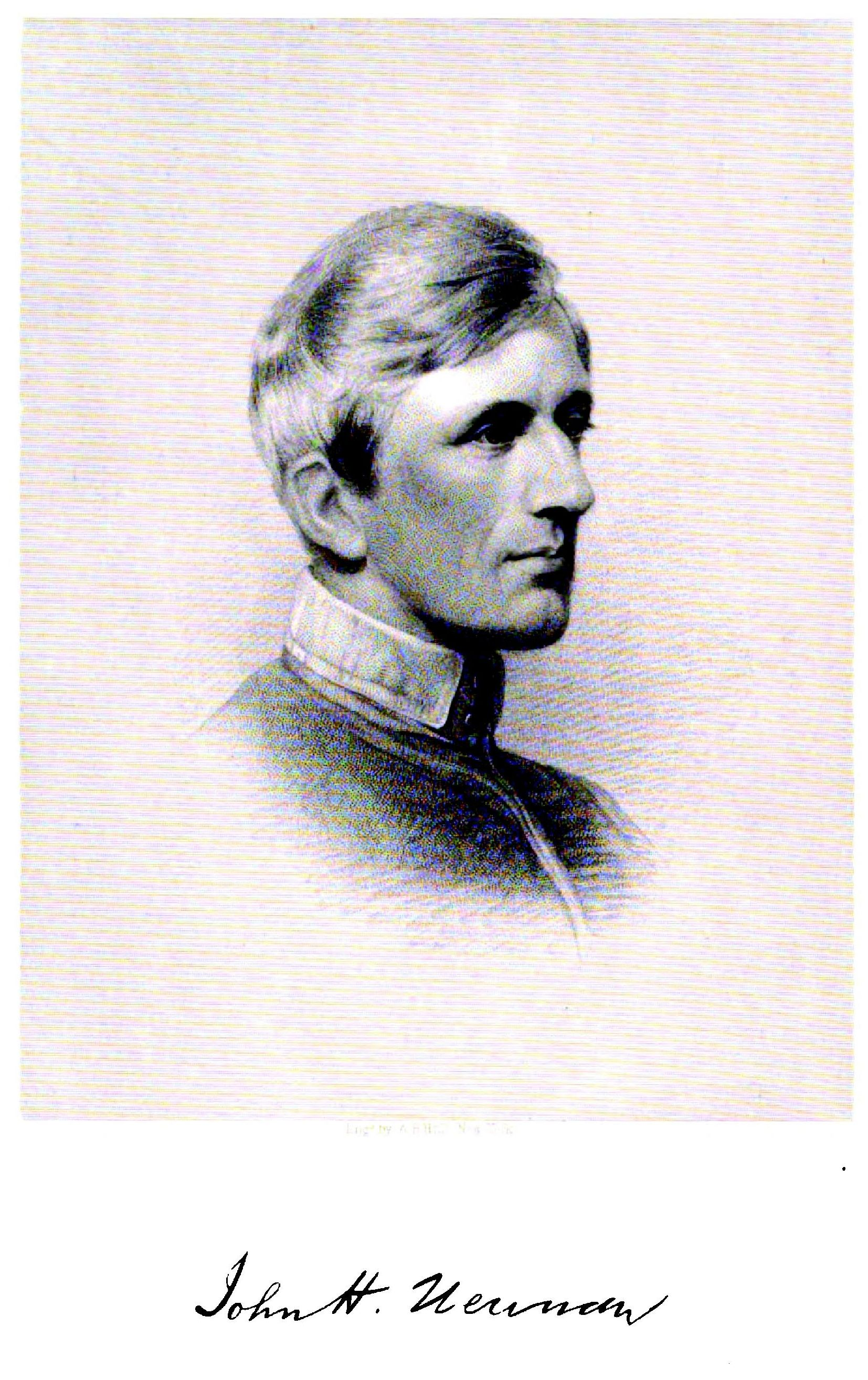
John Henry Newman

The Tracts for the Times were a series of 90 theological publications, varying in length from a few pages to book-length, produced by members of the English Oxford Movement, an Anglo-Catholic revival group, from 1833 to 1841. There were about a dozen authors, including Oxford Movement leaders John Keble, John Henry Newman and Edward Bouverie Pusey, with Newman taking the initiative in the series, and making the largest contribution. With the wide distribution associated with the tract form, and a price in pennies, the Tracts succeeded in drawing attention to the views of the Oxford Movement on points of doctrine, but also to its overall approach, to the extent that Tractarian became a synonym for supporter of the movement.

== Background ==
On 14 July 1833, Keble preached at St Mary's an assize sermon on "National Apostasy", which Newman afterwards regarded as the inauguration of the Oxford Movement. In the words of Richard William Church, it was "Keble who inspired, Froude who gave the impetus, and Newman who took up the work"; but the first organisation of it was due to Hugh James Rose, editor of the British Magazine, who has been styled "the Cambridge originator of the Oxford Movement". Rose met Oxford Movement figures on a visit to Oxford looking for magazine contributors, and it was in his rectory house at Hadleigh, Suffolk, that a meeting of High Church clergy was held over 25–26 July (Newman was not present, but Hurrell Froude, Arthur Philip Perceval, and William Palmer had gone to visit Rose), at which it was resolved to fight for "the apostolical succession and the integrity of the Prayer Book."

== Publication ==
Many of the tracts were labelled, indicating their intended audience: Ad Clerum (to the clergy), Ad Populum (to the people), or Ad Scholas (to scholars). The first 20 tracts appeared in 1833, with 30 more in 1834. After that the pace slowed, but the later contributions were more substantive on doctrinal matters. Initially these publications were anonymous, pseudonymous, or reprints from theologians of previous centuries. The authorship details of the tracts were recovered by later scholars of the Oxford Movement, with some tentative accounts of drafting. Through Francis Rivington, the tracts were published by the Rivington house in London, and were simultaneously published by J H Parker in Oxford.

== Opposition ==
The Tracts also provoked a secondary literature from opponents. Significant replies came from evangelicals, including that of William Goode in Tract XC Historically Refuted (1845) and Isaac Taylor. The term "Tractarian" applied to followers of Keble, Pusey and Newman (the Oxford Movement) was used by 1839, in sermons by Christopher Benson.

The series was brought to an end by the intervention of Richard Bagot, Bishop of Oxford, not unsympathetic to the Tractarians, after the appearance of Newman's Tract 90, which suggested a heterodox reading of the Thirty-Nine Articles of the Church of England, and caused controversy in the University.

== Literature ==
William Palmer in 1843 published A Narrative of Events Connected with the Publication of the Tracts for the Times, dedicated to Bagot. In the Preface he is concerned with arguing against the point of view that the Tracts were an attempt to introduce Roman Catholic beliefs; to place the Tracts in the context set up by the 1833 formation of the Association of Friends of the Church (set up by Hugh James Rose, Hurrell Froude and Palmer himself) that was the initial step in the Oxford Movement; and to distance his views from the editorial line of the British Critic. This work then provoked a major statement of his position by William George Ward.

== Table of the Tracts ==
Number	Date	Title	Author	Comment
1	9 September 1833	Thoughts on the Ministerial Commission, respectfully addressed to the clergy	John Henry Newman	
2	9 September 1833	The Catholic Church	Newman	
3	9 September 1833	Thoughts respectfully addressed to the Clergy on alterations in the Liturgy. The Burial Service. The Principle of Unity.	Newman	
4	21 September 1833	Adherence to the Apostolical Succession the safest course. On Alterations in the Prayer-book.	John Keble	
5	18 October 1833	A short address to his Brethren on the Nature and Constitution of the Church of Christ, and of the Branch of it established in England. By a Layman.	John William Bowden	
6	29 October 1833	The Present Obligation of Primitive Practice. A Sin of the Church.	Newman	Ad Populum
7	29 October 1833	The Episcopal Church Apostolical	Newman	
8	31 October 1833	The Gospel a Law of Liberty	Attributed to Newman. Possibly Hurrell Froude (ODNB)	
9	31 October 1833	On Shortening the Church Service	Hurrell Froude	
10	4 November 1833	Heads of a Week-day lecture, delivered to a country congregation in -------shire.	Newman	
11	11 November 1833	The Visible Church	Newman	
12	4 December 1833	Bishops, Priests, and Deacons. Richard Nelson. No. 1	Thomas Keble (as Richard Nelson)	"Richard Nelson" was a pseudonym.
13	5 December 1833	Sunday Lessons. The Principle of Selection.	John Keble	
14	12 December 1833	The Ember Days.	Alfred Menzies	Ad Populum. Menzies was a Fellow of Trinity College, Oxford. Graduating B.A. in 1832, he was ordained deacon and appointed Curate of Godalming in 1834, and ordained as priest in 1835. He died in Torquay, aged 26, on 24 February 1836.
15	13 December 1833	On the Apostolical Succession in the English Church.	William Palmer, completed by Newman	
16	17 December 1833	Advent.	Benjamin Harrison	
17	20 December 1833	The Ministerial Commission, a Trust from Christ for the Benefit of His People.	Benjamin Harrison	
18	21 December 1833	Thoughts on the Benefits of the System of Fasting Enjoined by Our Church.	Edward Pusey	Pusey published this tract under his initials.
19	23 December 1833	On arguing concerning the Apostolical Succession. On Reluctance to confess the Apostolical Succession.	Newman	
20	24 December 1833	The Visible Church. Letter III.	Newman	Ad Scholas.
21	1 January 1834	Mortification of the Flesh a Scripture duty.	Newman	Ad Populum. Newman gave initials on this tract, which supported Pusey's Tract 18.
22	6 January 1834	The Athanasian Creed. Richard Nelson. No. II.	Thomas Keble (as Richard Nelson)	
23	6 January 1834	The Faith and Obedience of Churchmen, the Strength of the Church.	Arthur Philip Perceval	
24	25 January 1834	The Scripture View of the Apostolical Commission.	Benjamin Harrison	
25	25 January 1834	The great Necessity and Advantage of Public Prayer.	Reprint, extracted from William Beveridge's sermon.	Ad Populum.
26	2 February 1834	The Necessity and Advantage of Frequent Communion.	Reprint, extracted from William Beveridge's sermon.	
27	24 February 1834	The History of Popish Transubstantiation.	Reprint, by John Cosin.	
28	25 March 1834	The same, concluded.	?	
29	25 March 1834	Christian Liberty; Or, Why Should We Belong to the Church of England? By a Layman.	John William Bowden	
30	25 March 1834	The same continued.	John William Bowden	
31	25 April 1834	The Reformed Church.	Newman	Ad Clerum.
32	25 April 1834	On the Standing Ordinances of Religion.	Charles Page Eden (ODNB)	
33	1 May 1834	Primitive Episcopacy.	Newman	Ad Scholas.
34	1 May 1834	Rites and Customs of the Church.	Newman	Ad Scholas.
35	8 May 1834	The People's Interest in Their Minister's Commission.	Arthur Philip Perceval	
36	11 June 1834	Account of Religious Sects at Present Existing in England.	Arthur Philip Perceval	
37	24 June 1834	Bishop Wilson's Form of Excommunication.	Reprint, by Thomas Wilson	Ad Populum.
38	25 June 1834	Via Media. No. I.	Newman	Ad Scholas. Later as a Catholic, in his 1845 Essay on the Development of Christian Doctrine (the Retractation of Anti-Catholic Statements), Newman recalled his language in this tract: In 1834 I also used, of certain doctrines of the Church of Rome, the epithets 'unscriptural,' 'profane,' 'impious,' 'bold,' 'unwarranted,' 'blasphemous,' 'gross,' 'monstrous,' 'cruel,' 'administering deceitful comfort,' and 'unauthorised,' in Tract 38. I do not mean to say that I had not a definite meaning in every one of those epithets, or that I did not weigh them before I used them.
39	25 June 1834	Bishop Wilson's Form of Receiving Penitents.	Reprint, by Thomas Wilson	Ad Populum.
40	25 June 1834	Baptism. Richard Nelson III.	John Keble (as Richard Nelson)	
41	24 August 1834	Via Media. No. II.	Newman	Ad Scholas.
42	24 August 1834	Bishop Wilson's Meditations on his Sacred Office. No. I, Sunday.	Reprint, by Thomas Wilson	Ad Populum.
43	21 September 1834	Length of the Public Service. Richard Nelson. No. IV.	Thomas Keble (as Richard Nelson)	Ad Populum.
44	28 September 1834	Bishop Wilson's Meditations on his Sacred Office. No. II, Monday.	Reprint, by Thomas Wilson	Ad Populum.
45	18 October 1834	The Grounds of our Faith.	Newman	Ad Clerum.
46	28 October 1834	Bishop Wilson's Meditations on his Sacred Office. No. III, Tuesday.	Reprint, by Thomas Wilson	Ad Populum.
47	1 November 1834	The Visible Church. Letter IV.	Newman	Ad Clerum.
48	30 November 1834	Bishop Wilson's Meditations on his Sacred Office. No. IV, Wednesday.	Reprint, by Thomas Wilson	Ad Populum.
49	25 December 1834	The Kingdom of Heaven.	Benjamin Harrison	
50	26 December 1834	Bishop Wilson's Meditations on his Sacred Office. No. IV, Wednesday (continued).	Reprint, by Thomas Wilson	Ad Populum.
51	6 January 1835	On Dissent without Reason in Conscience.	Robert F. Wilson	
52	[Undated]	Sermons for Saints' Days and Holidays. No. 1, St. Matthias.	John Keble	
53	24 February 1835	Bishop Wilson's Meditations on his Sacred Office. No. V, Thursday.	Reprint, by Thomas Wilson	Ad Populum
54	2 February 1835	Sermons for Saints' Days and Holidays. No. 2, The Annunciation of the Blessed Virgin Mary.	John Keble	
55	25 March 1835	Bishop Wilson's Meditations on his Sacred Office. No. V, Thursday (continued)	Reprint, by Thomas Wilson	Ad Populum
56	25 March 1835	Holy Days observed in the English Church.	John William Bowden	Ad Populum
57	25 March 1835	Sermons on Saints' Days. No. 3, St Mark's Day.	John Keble	Ad Populum
58	19 April 1835	On the Church as viewed by Faith and by the World.	John William Bowden	Ad Populum
59	25 April 1835	The position of the Church of Christ in England, relatively to the State and the Nation.	Hurrell Froude	Ad Clerum
60	25 March 1835	Sermons for Saints' Days and Holidays. No. 4. St. Philip and St. James.	John Keble	Ad Populum
61	1 May 1835	The Catholic Church a Witness against Illiberality.	Antony Buller	
62	1 May 1835	Bishop Wilson's Meditations on his Sacred Office. No. V, Thursday (continued)	Reprint, by Thomas Wilson	Ad Populum
63	1 May 1835	The Antiquity of the existing Liturgies.	Hurrell Froude	Ad Clerum
64	11 June 1835	Bishop Bull on the Ancient Liturgies.	Reprint, by George Bull	Ad Populum
65	28 June 1835	Bishop Wilson's Meditations on his Sacred Office. No. VI, Friday (abridged).	Reprint, by Thomas Wilson	Ad Populum. Later editions printed the work in full.
66	13 April 1835	On the Benefits of the System of Fasting Prescribed by Our Church. Supplement to Tract XVIII	Edward Pusey	
67	24 August 1835	Scriptural Views of Holy Baptism.	Edward Pusey	Ad Clerum. "In these [67, 68, 69] Pusey maintained that regeneration is connected with baptism both in scripture and in the writings of the early church. A second edition of the first of the three tracts appeared in 1839; in it the argument was entirely confined to scripture, but was expanded from forty-nine to four hundred pages."
68	29 September 1835	Scriptural views of Holy Baptism (continued).	Edward Pusey	Ad Clerum
69	18 October 1835	Scriptural Views of Holy Baptism (concluded).	Edward Pusey	Ad Clerum
70	28 October 1835	Bishop Wilson's Meditations on his Sacred Office. No. VII, Saturday (abridged).	Reprint, by Thomas Wilson	Ad Populum
71	1 January 1836	On the Controversy with the Romanists (No. I, Against Romanism).	Newman	Ad Clerum
72	6 January 1836	Archbishop Ussher on Prayers for the Dead (No. II, Against Romanism).	Reprint, by James Ussher	
73	2 February 1836	On the Introduction of Rationalistic Principles into Religion.	Newman	Ad Scholas. Against Thomas Erskine of Linlathen and Jacob Abbott.
74	25 April 1836	Catena Patrum No. I. Testimony of Writers in the later English Church to the Doctrine of the Apostolical Succession	Newman	Ad Populum. "It contains extracts from the writings of forty-three English theologians, the first being Bilson who died in 1616, and the last Mant who died in 1848. In the entire list there are but four Archbishops of Canterbury (Bancroft, Laud, Wake and Potter). There are very many non-jurors, some very distinguished typical Anglicans and others of no great note or weight." They were: Thomas Bilson; Richard Hooker; Richard Bancroft; Lancelot Andrewes; Joseph Hall; William Laud; John Bramhall; Joseph Mede; Francis Mason; Robert Sanderson; Henry Hammond; Jeremy Taylor; Peter Heylin; Richard Allestree; John Pearson; John Fell; George Bull; Edward Stillingfleet; Thomas Ken; William Beveridge; John Sharp; John Scott; William Wake; John Potter; Robert Nelson; John Kettlewell; George Hickes; William Law; John Johnson; Henry Dodwell; Jeremy Collier; Charles Leslie; Thomas Wilson; Joseph Bingham; Philip Skelton; Samuel Johnson; George Horne; William Jones; Samuel Horsley; Reginald Heber; John Jebb; William Van Mildert; Richard Mant.
75	24 June 1836	On the Roman Breviary as embodying the substance of the Devotional Services of the Church Catholic.	Newman	Ad Clerum. Draft by Hurrell Froude. This Tract influenced Robert Williams and Samuel Francis Wood, both laymen, to attempt a translation of the Roman Breviary. Newman put an end to this project.
76	29 September 1836; 1840	Catena Patrum No. II. Testimony of Writers in the later English Church to the Doctrine of Baptismal Regeneration	Newman	Ad Populum. John Jewell; Hooker; Andrewes; John Donne; Richard Field; Thomas Jackson; Laud; John Bramhall; Hammond; Taylor; Heylin; Allestrie; Isaac Barrow; Herbert Thorndike; Pearson; Bull; Thomas Comber; Ken; Simon Patrick; Beveridge; Sharp; Scott; Robert Jenkin; Thomas Sherlock; William Wall; Potter; Nelson; Daniel Waterland; Kettlewell; Hickes; Johnson; Leslie; Wilson; Bingham; Skelton; Horne; Jones; Reginald Heber; Jebb; Van Mildert; Mant.
77	1 November 1836	An Earnest Remonstrance to the Author of 'The Pope's Letter'.	Edward Pusey, reprinted.	Directed to Charles Dickinson after an anonymous attack on the Tractarian view of prayers for the dead.
78	2 February 1837	Catena Patrum. No. III. Testimony of Writers in the later English Church to the duty of maintaining, Quod semper, quod ubique, quod ab omnibus traditum est.	Henry Edward Manning and Charles Marriott	Ad Populum. The authors cited are: Jewell; Convocation of 1571; The Queen's Council of 1582; Bilson; Hooker; Convocation of 1603; John Overall; Morton; Field; White; Hall; Laud; Richard Montagu; Jackson; Mede; James Ussher; Bramhall; Sanderson; John Cosin; Hammond; Thorndike; Taylor; Heylin; Commissioners of 1662; Pearson; Barrow; Bull; Edward Stillingfleet; Ken; Beveridge; Patrick; Sharp; Potter; John Ernest Grabe; Thomas Brett; Hickes; Jeremy Collier; Leslie; Waterland; Bingham; Jebb; Van Mildert.
79	25 March 1837	On Purgatory (Against Romanism, No. III).	Newman	Ad Clerum.
80	[Undated]	On Reserve in communicating Religious Knowledge, Parts I-III.	Isaac Williams	This tract was criticised by James Henry Monk. Williams replied, taking the criticism to be hasty.
81	1 November 1837	Catena Patrum. No. IV. Testimony of Writers in the later English Church to the doctrine of the Eucharistic Sacrifice. with an historical account of the changes in the Liturgy as to the expression of that doctrine.	Edward Pusey	The catena was mostly the work of Benjamin Harrison. Authors cited: Jewell; Bilson; Hooker; Overall; Field; John Buckeridge; Thomas Morton; Andrewes; Mason; Francis White; Laud; Hall; Montagu; William Forbes; Mede; Brian Duppa; Compilers of the Scotch Prayer Book; William Nicholson; Bramhall; Cosin; Heylyn; Anthony Sparrow; Henry Ferne; Hammond; Thomas Barlow; Thorndike; Taylor; Daniel Brevint; William Sancroft; Matthew Scrivener; John Fell; Patrick; Gabriel Towerson; Bull; Stillingfleet; Smith; Beveridge; George Hooper; Henry Dodwell; Hickes; Comber; Collier; Nelson; Wake; Johnson; Wilson; Sherlock; Grabe; Leslie; Brett; Thomas Bennet; John Potter; John Hughes; Roger Laurence; William Law; Charles Wheatly; Glocester Ridley; Compilers of the American Prayer Book; William Jones of Nayland; Horsley; Charles Daubeny; Alexander Jolly; Henry Phillpotts. "[Pusey's] ‘Tracts’ on the holy eucharist appeared in 1836. Their primary object was to recall the attention of churchmen to the almost forgotten sacrificial aspect of the eucharist, as it was held by the early church and constantly asserted in the writings of the best Anglican divines. At the same time he was careful to guard his statements against any popular confusion with the distinctive doctrine of the Roman church."
82	1 November 1837	Preface, Title-Page, and Contents to Volume IV. The Preface includes Letter to a Magazine on the subject of Dr. Pusey's Tract on Baptism.	Newman	
83	29 June 1838	Advent Sermons on Antichrist.	Newman	
84	24 August 1838	Whether a Clergyman of the Church of England be now bound to have Morning and Evening Prayers daily in his Parish Church.	Thomas Keble, conclusion by George Prevost.	
85	21 September 1838	Letters on the Scripture proof of the Doctrines of the Church. Part I.	Newman	
86	25 March 1839	Indications of a superintending Providence in the preservation of the Prayer-book and in the changes which it has undergone.	Isaac Williams	
87	2 February 1840	On Reserve in communicating Religious Knowledge (conclusion).	Isaac Williams	Ad Clerum.
88	25 March 1840	The Greek Devotions of Bishop Andrews, translated and arranged.	Newman	
89	[Undated]	On the Mysticism Attributed to the Fathers of the Church.	John Keble	"...an attempted exposition of the “principles” governing patristic figurative exegesis of the Scriptures" It was attacked by Samuel Roffey Maitland in A letter to a friend, on the Tract for the times, no. 89 (1841).
90	25 January 1841	Remarks on Certain Passages in the Thirty-Nine Articles	John Henry Newman	A protest within the University of Oxford was brought against Tract 90 by John Griffiths, Thomas Churton, Henry Bristow Wilson, and Archibald Tait; the resulting furore eventually led the Bishop of Oxford to bring the series to a close.

== Further publications ==
Two other ambitious projects of the Oxford Movement as a whole were conceived and launched in the same period: the Library of Anglo-Catholic Theology that gave extensive republication to the works of the Caroline Divines and others who were cited in the Tracts; and the Library of the Fathers. Isaac Williams with William John Copeland edited Plain Sermons by Contributors to the Tracts for the Times, in ten volumes, appearing from 1839 to 1848.
