= Roman Catholic (term) =

Term for the Catholic Church or its members

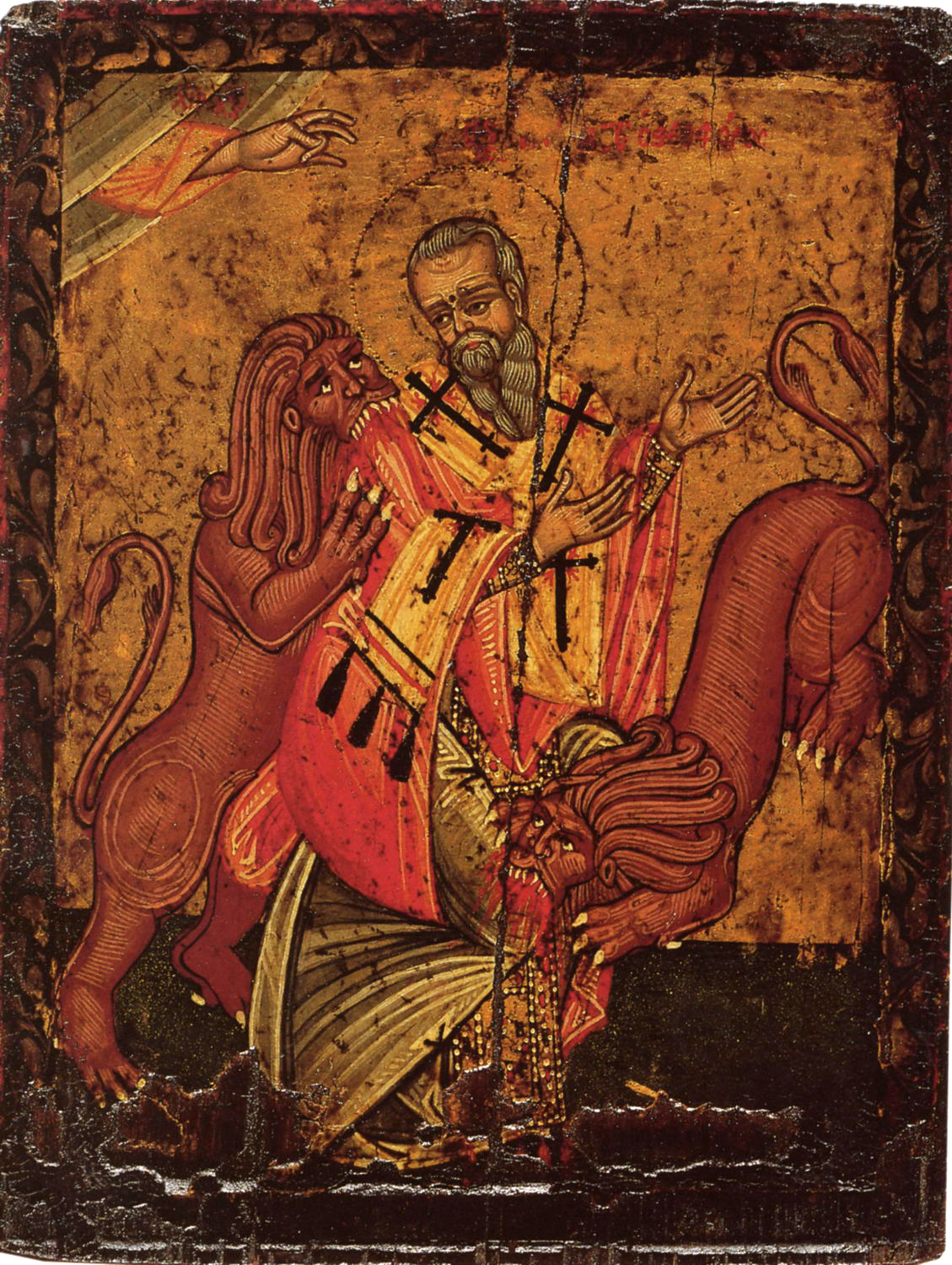
The first use of the term "Catholic Church" (literally meaning "universal church") was by the church father Saint Ignatius of Antioch in his Letter to the Smyrnaeans (circa 110 AD). Ignatius of Antioch is also attributed the earliest recorded use of the term "Christianity" (Greek: Χριστιανισμός) in 100 AD He died in Rome, with his relics located in the Basilica of San Clemente al Laterano.

The term Roman Catholic is sometimes used to differentiate the Catholic Church and its members in full communion with the pope in Rome from other Christians who identify as "Catholic". It is also sometimes used to differentiate adherents to the Latin Church and its use of the Roman Rite from Catholics of the Eastern Catholic Churches. It is not the official name preferred by the Holy See or bishops in full communion with the pope as a designation for their faith or institution.

The term "catholic" is one of the Four Marks of the Church set out in the Nicene Creed, a statement of belief widely accepted across Christian denominations. Catholics, Eastern Orthodox, and Oriental Orthodox consider the term "Catholic" to refer to a single institutional one true church, while Protestant ecclesiology considers it to refer to a church invisible referred to as the Christian Church. The use of "Roman" or "Roman Catholic" to differentiate the Catholic Church dates from the Middle Ages.

Following the pejorative term "papist", attested in English since 1528, the terms "Popish Catholic" and "Romish Catholic" came into use in English during the Protestant Reformation. From the 17th century, "Roman Catholic Church" has been used as a synonym for the Catholic Church by some Anglicans and other Protestants in English-speaking countries. The phrase is used by Catholics to emphasize the unique communion of the Catholic Church with the Bishop of Rome, the Pope, considered to be the successor to Saint Peter.

== History of the term ==
Formulations such as the "Holy Roman Church" or the "Roman Catholic Church" have occurred by officials of the Catholic Church before and after the Reformation. It is also used in the context of ecumenical dialogue. The first known occurrence of "Roman Catholic" as a synonym for "Catholic Church" was in communication with the Armenian Apostolic Church in 1208, after the East–West Schism.

=== 16th and 17th centuries ===
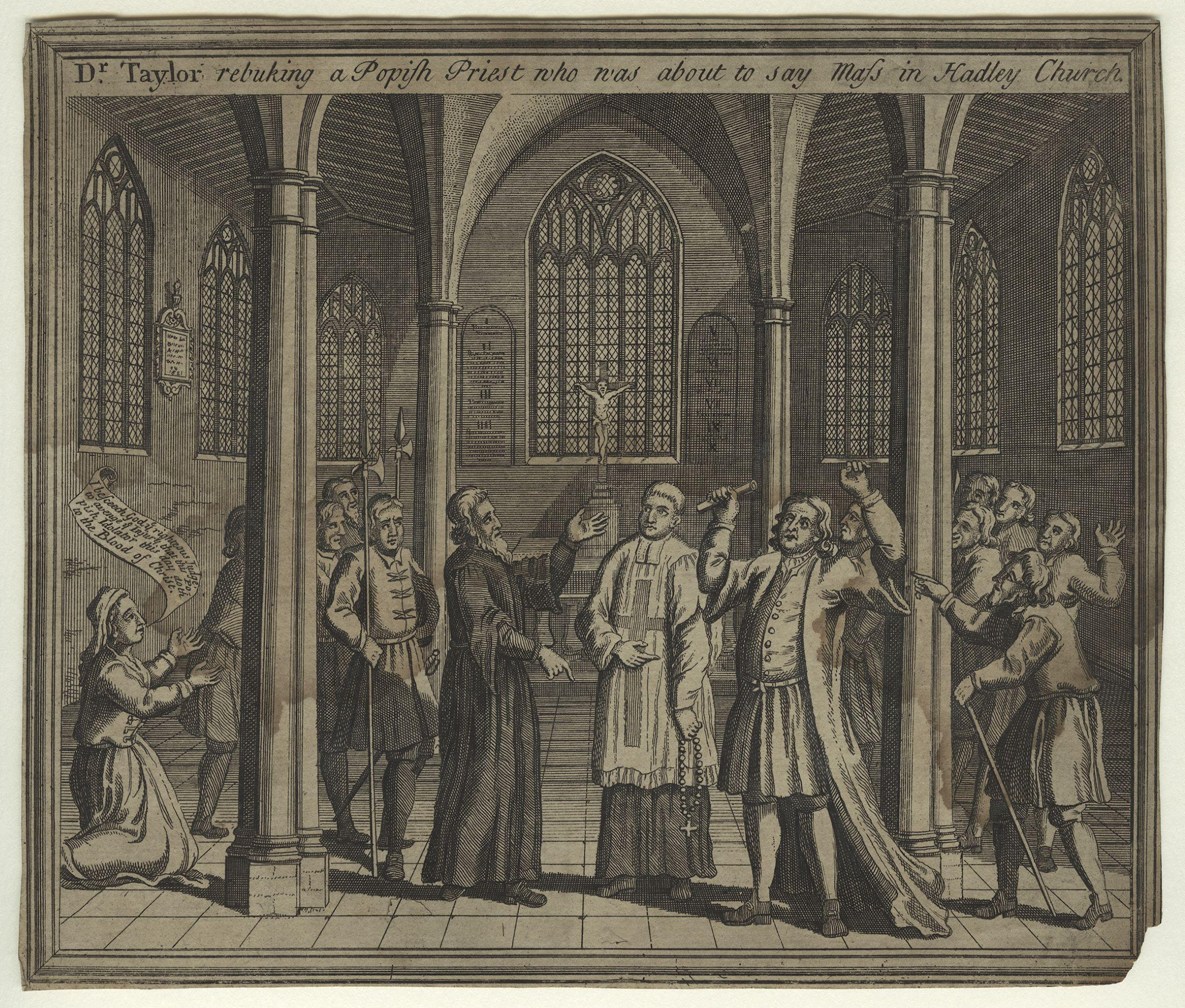
Woodcut depicting a "Popish priest" being rebuked by 16th-century English cleric Thomas Taylor; the National Gallery, London

The terms "Romish Catholic" and "Roman Catholic", along with "Popish Catholic", were brought into use in the English language chiefly by adherents of the Church of England.

The reign of Elizabeth I of England at the end of the 16th century was marked by conflicts in Ireland. Those opposed to English rule forged alliances with those against the Protestant Reformation, making the term "Roman Catholic" almost synonymous with being Irish during that period, although that usage changed significantly over time.

Like the term "Anglican", the term "Roman Catholic" came into widespread use in the English language only in the 17th century. The terms "Romish Catholic" and "Roman Catholic" were both used in the 17th century and "Roman Catholic" was used in some official documents, such as those relating to the Spanish Match in the 1620s.

=== 18th and 19th centuries ===
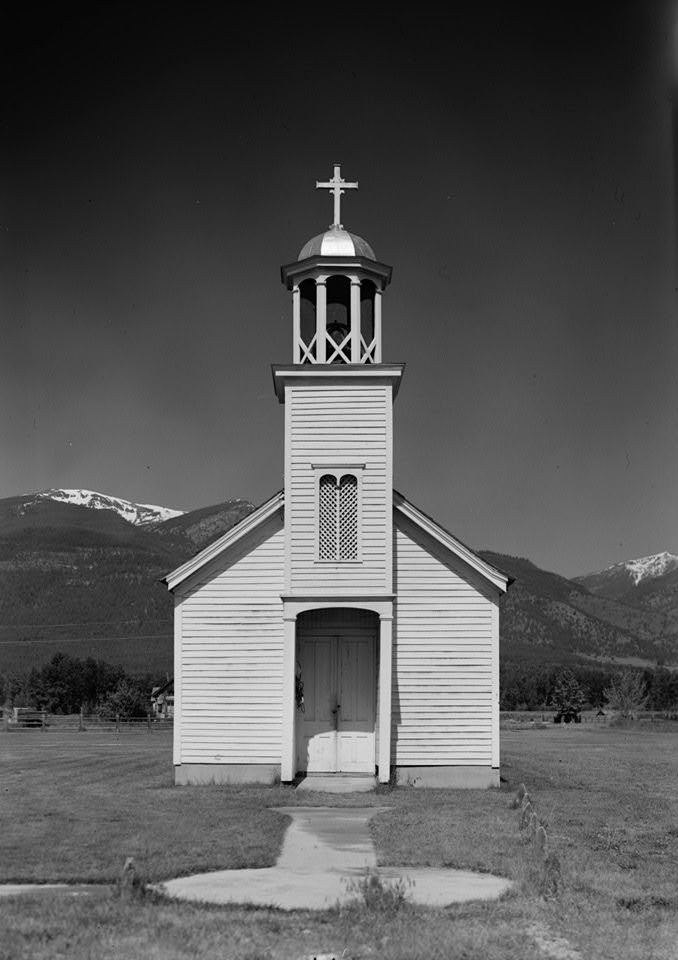
Saint Mary's Roman Catholic Mission, built in 1866 in Stevensville, Montana

The official and popular uses of the term "Roman Catholic" in the English language grew in the 18th century. A letter by John Wesley, one of the founders of Methodism, published in 1749 is addressed to "a Roman Catholick". Up to the reign of George III, Catholics in Britain who recognized the Pope as head of the Church had generally been designated in official documents as "Papists". In 1792, however, this phraseology was changed and, in the Speech from the Throne, the term "Roman Catholic" was used.

By the early 19th century, the term "Roman Catholic" had become well established in the English-speaking world. As the movement that led to Catholic Emancipation through the Roman Catholic Relief Act 1829 grew, many Anglicans and Protestants generally began to accept that being a Roman Catholic was not synonymous with being disloyal to the British Crown. While believing that in the past the term Roman Catholic may have been synonymous with rebel, they held that it was by then as indicative of loyalty as membership in any other Christian denomination. The situation had been very different two centuries before, when Pope Paul V forbade English members of his church from taking an oath of allegiance to King James I, a prohibition that not all of them observed.

Also in the 19th century, some prominent Anglican theologians, such as William Palmer and John Keble, supported the Branch Theory, which viewed the universal Church as having three principal branches: Anglican, Roman and Eastern. The 1824 issue of The Christian Observer defined the term Roman Catholic as a member of the "Roman Branch of the Church". By 1828, speeches in the British Parliament routinely used the term Roman Catholic and referred to the "Holy Roman Catholic and Apostolic Church".

In the United States, use of the term "Roman Catholic", as well as the number of Catholics, began to grow only in the early 19th century. Like the term "papist", "Romanist" was often used as a mainly pejorative term for Roman Catholics at the time. In 1790, there were only 100 Catholics in New York and some 30,000 in the whole country, with only 29 priests. As the number of Catholics in the United States grew rapidly from 150,000 to 1.7 million between 1815 and 1850, mostly by way of immigration from Ireland and the German Confederation, many clergy followed to serve that population, and Roman Catholic parishes were established. The terms "Roman Catholic" and "Holy Roman Catholic" thus gained widespread use in the United States in the 19th century, both in popular usage and in official documents. In 1866, US President Andrew Johnson attended a meeting of the Council of the Roman Catholic Church.

==== Branch theory ====
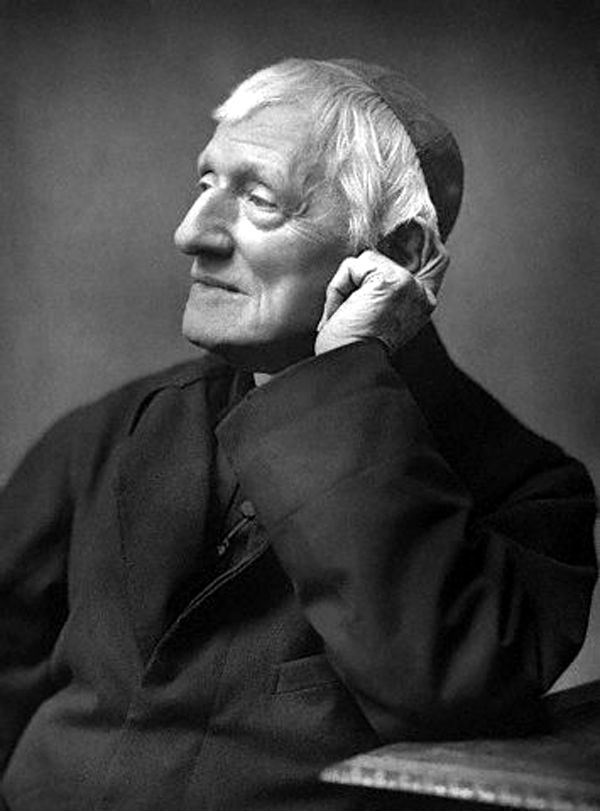
The branch theory was popularized during the Anglican Oxford Movement, of which John Henry Newman was a member. Newman later dropped that conviction and converted to the Catholic Church.

There is sometimes controversy about the name "Roman Catholic Church" when it is used by members of other churches to suggest that the church in full communion with Rome is only one part of the One, Holy, Catholic and Apostolic Church. The term "Roman Catholic" was often used by those in the Church of England (Anglican) who wished to distinguish the Catholic Churches from Anglicanism. This "branch" theory (i.e. one Catholic Church with three branches of Anglican, Eastern Orthodox, and Roman Catholic) has received a mixed reception even within Anglicanism.

In 1864, the Holy Office rejected the branch theory and affirmed in a letter written to the English bishops that the Roman Church is not just a part of the Catholic Church and stating that "there is no other Catholic Church except that which is built on the one man, Peter". In 1870, English bishops attending the First Vatican Council raised objections to the expression Sancta Romana Catholica Ecclesia ("Holy Roman Catholic Church"), which appeared in the schema (the draft) of the council's Dogmatic Constitution on the Catholic Faith. The bishops proposed for the word "Roman" to be omitted or at least for commas to be inserted between the adjectives out of concern that use of the term "Roman Catholic" would lend support to proponents of the branch theory. While the council overwhelmingly rejected that proposal, the text was finally modified to read "Sancta Catholica Apostolica Romana Ecclesia" translated into English either as "the Holy Catholic Apostolic Roman Church" or, by separating each adjective, as "the holy, catholic, apostolic and Roman Church". (Note: The opening words of the first chapter of the dogmatic constitution Dei Filius, which in the original draft were "Sancta Romana Catholica Ecclesia", were voted on on three separate dates. On the first occasion, when that chapter alone was considered, two votes concerned the opening words. The first was on a proposal by a few English-speaking bishops to delete the word Romana, thus changing Sancta Romana Catholica Ecclesia ("Holy Roman Catholic Church") to Sancta Catholica Ecclesia ("Holy Catholic Church"). This was overwhelmingly defeated. The second vote held immediately afterwards was on a proposal to insert a comma so that Sancta Romana Catholica Ecclesia ("Holy Roman Catholic Church") would become Sancta Romana, Catholica Ecclesia ("Holy Roman, Catholic Church"). That also was defeated but not as overwhelmingly as the first proposal. In a later vote, on 12 April 1870, the text as a whole, which preserved the same opening words, was approved with 515 affirmative votes (placet) and no opposing votes (non placet); but there were 83 placet iuxta modum votes, asking for changes, many of them regarding the opening words of chapter I. In view of those reservations, the text presented for a final vote and approved unanimously on 24 April 1870 changed the order of the words and added "apostolica", so that Sancta Romana Catholica Ecclesia became Sancta Catholica Apostolica Romana Ecclesia ("Holy Catholic Apostolic Roman Church").)

=== 20th century ===
Countries that recognize the Catholic Church as the state church or as a tolerated church commonly use the title "Roman Catholic Church" in constitutional documents, however this is not the official name preferred by the Holy See or bishops in full communion with the pope as a designation for their faith or institution.

From 1937 to 1972, the Constitution of Ireland used an extended name for the church, recognising the "special position of the 'Holy Catholic Apostolic and Roman Church". The Anglican Archbishop of Dublin had objected to "Catholic Church" and quoted the Council of Trent for the longer title, which was approved by Eugenio Pacelli and Pope Pius XI. The same extended name is used in a 2009 Irish law.

American Catholics, who by the year 1900 were 12 million people and had a predominantly Irish clergy, objected to what they considered the reproachful terms Popish and Romish and preferred the term Roman Catholic. Use of "Roman Catholic" continued to spread in the United States and Canada In the early 20th century to refer to individuals, parishes, and their schools. For instance, the 1915 Report of the Commissioner of Education of the United States had a specific section for "Roman Catholic Parish Schools". By 1918, legal proceedings in state supreme courts (from Delaware to Minnesota) and laws passed in the State of New York used the term "Roman Catholic parish". Connecticut state law, last revised in 1955, also provides for organising parish corporations affiliated with the "Roman Catholic Church".

The Baltimore Catechism, the official catechism authorized by the Catholic bishops of the United States between 1885 and 1965, states: "That is why we are called Roman Catholics; to show that we are united to the real successor of St. Peter" (Question 118), and refers to the Church as the "Roman Catholic Church" under Questions 114 and 131. Usage of the name "Roman Catholic Church", however, does not appear in the Catechism of the Catholic Church first published in 1992.

== Current usage ==
"Roman Catholic" is used to refer to individuals, or as descriptor to refer to worship, parishes, festivals, etc, in particular to emphasize communion with the pope in Rome. It is sometimes also identified with "Catholic" in general, or to specify "Western Catholic" (equivalent to "Latin Catholic") and "Roman-Rite Catholic" in contrast to the Eastern Catholics who also share communion with the pope.

"Catholic Church" (or "the Church") is used in modern official documents by the Holy See, including the Catechism of the Catholic Church (1990), the Code of Canon Law (1983). It is also used in the ecumenical council documents of the Second Vatican Council (1962–1965), the First Vatican Council (1869–1870) and the Council of Trent (1545–1563), and numerous other documents.

"Roman Catholic Church" has also been used in official texts of the Holy See to refer to the entirety of the church that is in full communion with it, encompassing both its Eastern and Western elements. This is reflected in reference books such as John Hardon's Modern Catholic Dictionary. In its relations with other churches, it frequently uses the name "Roman Catholic Church", which it also uses internally, though less frequently. The use of "Roman", "Holy", and "Apostolic" are accepted by the Church as descriptive names.

In the 21st century, the three terms – "Catholic Church", "Roman Catholic Church" and "Holy Roman Catholic Church" – continue to appear in various books and other publications.

=== "Roman Catholic" and "Catholic" ===
A typical parish sign in the United States

Official church documents have used both the terms "Catholic Church" and "Roman Catholic Church" to refer to the worldwide church as a whole, including Eastern Catholics, as when Pope Pius XII taught in Humani generis that "the Mystical Body of Christ and the Roman Catholic Church are one and the same thing." Official documents such as Divini illius Magistri, Humani generis, a declaration of 23 November 2006 and another of 30 November 2006 also use "Roman Catholic" to speak of it as a whole.

According to J.C. Cooper, "In popular usage, 'Catholic' usually means 'Roman Catholic'," a usage opposed by some, including some Protestants. "Catholic" usually refers to members of any of the 24 constituent Churches, the one Western and the 23 Eastern.

Some writers, such as Kenneth Whitehead and Patrick Madrid, however, argue that the only proper name for the church is "the Catholic Church". Whitehead states that "The term Roman Catholic is not used by the Church herself; it is a relatively modern term, and one, moreover, that is confined largely to the English language. The English-speaking bishops at the First Vatican Council in 1870, in fact, conducted a vigorous and successful campaign to insure that the term Roman Catholic was nowhere included in any of the Council's official documents about the Church herself, and the term was not included." Whitehead also states that "the proper name of the Church, then, is 'the Catholic Church', never 'the Christian Church'." Cardinal Walter Kasper has argued that the term "Roman Catholic" should not be used to denote the entire Catholic Church, stating this term would "emphasize the Roman and downplay the Catholic".

Rev. Bud Heckman states that "Representatives of the Catholic Church are at times required to use the term 'Roman Catholic Church' in certain dialogues, especially in the ecumenical milieu, since some other Christians consider their own churches to also be authentically Catholic." For instance, the term Roman Catholic was used in the dialogue with the Anglican Archbishop of Canterbury Donald Coggan on 29 April 1977.

=== "Roman Catholic" and "Eastern Catholic" ===
Some use the term "Roman Catholic" to refer to Latin Church Catholics who predominantly (but not exclusively) worship according to the Roman Rite, as opposed to Eastern Catholics. An example is the statement in the book When other Christians become Catholic: "the individual becomes Eastern Catholic, not Roman Catholic." In this context, converts from Eastern Orthodox or Oriental Orthodox churches are enrolled in the closest corresponding Eastern Catholic church according Canon Law. Similarly the Catholic Faith Handbook for Youth states that "not all Catholics are Roman Catholics and there are other Catholic Churches", using the term "Roman Catholic" to refer to Latin Church members alone.

Some Eastern Catholic writers make the same distinction between Roman Catholic and Eastern Catholic. Additionally, in other languages, the usage varies significantly. (Note: For an example of a variant non-English use, Arabic-speaking Melkite Catholics, who use the Byzantine liturgical rite, occasionally identify themselves as Rum Katolique with reference to the "New Rome" of Constantinople, home of their Byzantine-rite heritage (Faulk, p. 7). On the other hand, the Maronites, who are also Arabic-speaking but not of Byzantine Rite, call themselves Roman Catholics with reference to the Rome of the Popes.) Some of the writers who draw a contrast between "Roman Catholics" and "Eastern Catholics" may perhaps be distinguishing Eastern Catholics not from Latin or Western Catholics in general, but only from those (the majority of Latin Catholics) who use the Roman liturgical rite. Adrian Fortescue explicitly made this distinction, saying that, just as "Armenian Catholic" is used to mean a Catholic who uses the Armenian rite, "Roman Catholic" could be used to mean a Catholic who uses the Roman Rite. In this sense, he said, an Ambrosian Catholic, though a member of the Latin or Western Church, is not a "Roman" Catholic. He admitted, however, that this usage is uncommon.

Some Eastern Catholics, while maintaining that they are in union with the Bishop of Rome, reject the description of themselves as being "Roman Catholics". Others, however, have historically referred to themselves as "Roman Catholics" and "Roman Catholic" sometimes appears in the compound name of Eastern Catholic parish churches, e.g. St. Anthony's Maronite Roman Catholic Church. Academic usage of "Roman Catholic" to describe Eastern Catholic bodies and persons is also extant.

Orthodox Christians sometimes use the term "Uniate" (occasionally spelled "Uniat") to describe the Eastern Catholic churches which were previously Eastern or Oriental Orthodox, although some consider this term derogatory. Official Catholic documents no longer use the term, due to its perceived negative overtones. In fact, according to John Erickson of Saint Vladimir's Orthodox Theological Seminary, "The term 'uniate' itself, once used with pride in the Roman communion, had long since come to be considered as pejorative. 'Eastern Rite Catholic' also was no longer in vogue because it might suggest that the Catholics in question differed from Latins only in the externals of worship. According to Richard John Neuhaus, the Second Vatican Council affirmed rather that "Eastern Catholics constituted churches, whose vocation was to provide a bridge to the separated churches of the East."

=== "Roman Catholic" and other Catholic ===
When used in a broader sense, the term "Catholic" is distinguished from "Roman Catholic", which specifically denotes allegiance to the Bishop of Rome, i.e. the Pope. When thus used, "Catholic" also refers to many other Christians, especially Eastern Orthodox and Anglicans, but also to others, including Old Catholics and members of various Independent Catholic churches, who consider themselves to be within the "Catholic" tradition. They describe themselves as "Catholic", but not "Roman Catholic" and not under the authority of the Pope. Similarly, Henry Mills Alden writes:

The various Protestant sects cannot constitute one Church because they have no intercommunion... each Protestant Church, whether Methodist or Baptist or whatever, is in perfect communion with itself everywhere as the Roman Catholic; and in this respect, consequently, the Roman Catholic has no advantage or superiority, except in the point of numbers. As a further necessary consequence, it is plain that the Roman Church is no more Catholic in any sense than a Methodist or a Baptist.

According to this viewpoint, "For those who 'belong to the Church,' the term Methodist Catholic, or Presbyterian Catholic, or Baptist Catholic, is as proper as the term Roman Catholic. It simply means that body of Christian believers over the world who agree in their religious views, and accept the same ecclesiastical forms."

=== Papal usage ===
Pope John Paul II referred to himself as "the Head of the Roman Catholic Church" (29 September 1979). He called the Church "Roman Catholic" when speaking to the Jewish community in Mainz on 17 November 1980, in a message to those celebrating the 450th anniversary of the Confessio Augustana on 25 June 1980, when speaking to the people of Mechelen, Belgium on 18 May 1985, when talking to representatives of Christian confessions in Copenhagen, Denmark on 7 June 1989, when addressing a delegation from the Ecumenical Patriarchate of Constantinople on 29 June 1989, at a meeting of the Ukrainian Synod in Rome on 24 March 1980, at a prayer meeting in the Orthodox cathedral of Bialystok, Poland on 5 June 1991, when speaking to the Polish Ecumenical Council in Holy Trinity Church, Warsaw 9 June 1991, at an ecumenical meeting in the Aula Magna of the Colégio Catarinense, in Florianópolis, Brazil on 18 October 1991, and at the Angelus in São Salvador da Bahia, Brazil on 20 October 1991.

Pope Benedict XVI called the Church "the Roman Catholic Church" at a meeting in Warsaw on 25 May 2006 and in joint declarations that he signed with Archbishop of Canterbury Rowan Williams on 23 November 2006 and with Patriarch Bartholomew I of Constantinople on 30 November 2006.

== See also ==
- Uniate
