= John William Bowden =

English functionary (1798–1844)

John William Bowden (21 February 1798 – 15 September 1844) was an English functionary and writer on church matters. He was a close friend of John Henry Newman, who described their relationship in his Apologia. According to David L Edwards, this was one of several "bitter" partings with early friends by Newman.

== Life ==
He was born in London, the eldest son of John Bowden, Governor of the Bank of England in the 1820s. In 1812 he went to Harrow School, and in 1817 entered as a commoner at Trinity College, Oxford, simultaneously with his close friend John Henry Newman. In 1830 Bowden obtained mathematical honours, and on 24 November took his degree of B.A. In collaboration with Newman, in the following year, he wrote a polemical poem in two cantos, St. Bartholomew's Eve On 4 June 1823 Bowden took his degree of M.A.

In the autumn of 1826 he was appointed a commissioner of stamps, holding the position for fourteen years, resigning it on account of ill-health in 1840. From 1833 he keenly took part in the Tractarian movement. In the spring of 1839 Bowden was first attacked by tuberculosis, which proved fatal. In the autumn of 1839 he went abroad with his family. The winter of that year he spent in Malta.

During the summer of 1843, Bowden's complaint returned with increased severity, and he died at his father's house in Grosvenor Place. Newman attested that he died "In undoubting communion with the church of Andrewes and Laud", adding, with reference to his interment at Fulham, "he still lives here, the light and comfort of many hearts, who ask no happier, holier end than his."

== Works ==
To Hugh James Rose's British Magazine he contributed six of the 178 hymns that in 1836 were collected as Lyra Apostolica. His contributions are signed α. Newman and Bowden worked together on the Tracts for the Times. For the British Critic Bowden supplied four major contributions. These were: July 1836, Rise of the Papal Power; April 1837, On Gothic Architecture; January 1839, On British Association; July 1841, On the Church in the Mediterranean. The last two were published under Newman's editorship.

In the spring of 1840 he published his Life of Gregory the Seventh. This work had been first suggested to him by Newman, prompted by Hurrell Froude. He proposed to write, but never produced, a Life of St. Boniface, which in 1843 was announced as in preparation. Bowden's only publication in 1843 was A few Remarks on Pews. A posthumous publication in 1845 was Thoughts on the Work of the Six Days of Creation. The key to his argument was the motto on the title-page, Novum Testamentum in Veteri velabatur, Vetus Testamentum in Novo revelatur.

== Family ==
Bowden married, on 6 June 1828, Elizabeth, youngest daughter of Sir John Edward Swinburne. They had two children, Charles Henry Bowden (1836–1906), a priest of the Birmingham Oratory, and Emily Frances Bowden (1833–1909), translator of Ida, Countess von Hahn-Hahn's Fathers of the Desert. Elizabeth was a Catholic convert, and founder of a Catholic church in Fulham. She died in 1896.
