= Apologia Pro Vita Sua =

1864 religious work by John Henry Newman

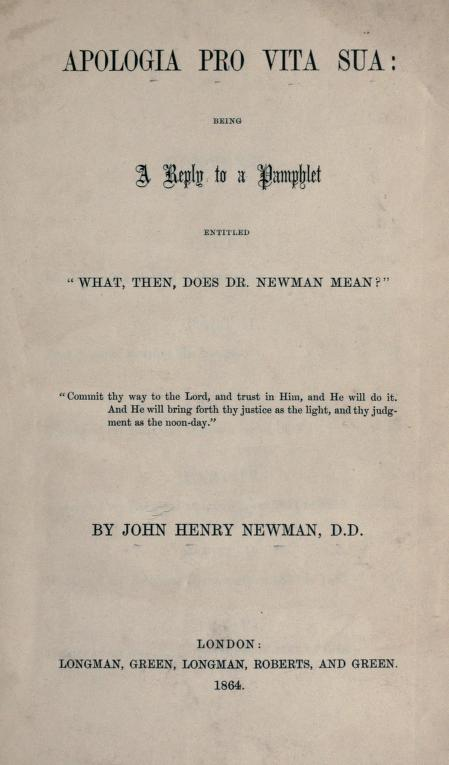
- Title page of the first edition
- Author: John Henry Newman
- Language: English
- Publisher: Longman, Green, Longman, Roberts & Green
- Publication date: 1864
- Publication place: England

Apologia Pro Vita Sua (transl. 'A defence of one's own life') is John Henry Newman's history of his religious opinions, showing how his opinions had been formed and how they had led him from Anglicanism to the Catholic Church. It was originally published as a series of pamphlets in 1864 in response to an attack by Charles Kingsley against Newman's honesty. Though Newman's honesty had been widely questioned for years, the Apologia was immensely successful and cleared Newman's name. Newman published a revised version in 1865.

== Background ==
Between the publication of Tract 90 in 1841 and his conversion to Catholicism in 1845, Newman had been accused of secretly working to convert people to Catholicism while outwardly professing to be Anglican, and the belief in his dishonesty during that period persisted even into the 1860s. Newman's reputation in the early 1860s was at a low point, and he was seen as a "safe object" for insult and ridicule. He had refrained from answering the attacks because of their anonymity or because they had been only short gibes; however, he had decided that if someone more well-known were to make an extended and public attack against him, he would defend himself.

In the January 1864 issue of Macmillan's Magazine, Charles Kingsley, in a review of James Anthony Froude's History of England, remarked: "Truth, for its own sake, had never been a virtue with the Roman clergy. Father Newman informs us that it need not, and on the whole ought not to be." Newman received a copy of the issue on 30 December 1863; not knowing who had written the review, he wrote to the publisher noting that the accusation had not been substantiated by any evidence. Kingsley replied, justifying his comment by pointing to a sermon Newman had given in 1844, though without giving a specific passage.

Newman answered that the sermon in question had been given while he was yet Anglican, and moreover contained no such claim about the truthfulness of Catholic priests. Kingsley wrote an apology which he offered to publish, but Newman objected that, as written, it implied that Newman had explained an offending passage, while Newman contended that he had never been provided with a passage from his writings to explain. Kingsley revised the apology, and, though Newman was still dissatisfied, published it in the February issue of Macmillan's Magazine.

In response, Newman published a pamphlet on 12 February containing the correspondence between himself and Kingsley along with some "reflections", including a sarcastic summary of the correspondence. On 20 February, Richard Holt Hutton, editor of The Spectator, published a review of the pamphlet and summary of the controversy, concluding that Newman was in the right, though had perhaps been too harsh. Hutton praised Newman's writing and intellect, calling him "the very greatest master of delicate and polished sarcasm in the English language", and claiming that Kingsley "drew down upon himself" Newman's response.

Though Newman had previously informed Kingsley that he considered Kingsley's letters public, which Kingsley readily acknowledged as his right, Kingsley was angered by the publishing of the correspondence, viewing it as a breach of etiquette. On 20 March, he published a pamphlet entitled What, Then, Does Dr. Newman Mean?, in which, though retracting the charge of "conscious dishonesty", he further attacked Newman's truthfulness. Hutton again took Newman's part and accused Kingsley of adding to the original offence, and there was a general feeling that Kingsley had gone too far. Newman, seeing that public opinion was in his favour, decided to take the opportunity for a fair hearing and publish a "history of [his] opinions".

== Writing and publication ==
Newman originally planned to deliver his response as a series of lectures, but decided that such a format would not be suitable for the personal history he intended. A complete book would also be unsuitable both because the length would deter readers and because by the time it was published, the controversy would have cooled and interest would have waned. Instead, Newman decided to publish a series of weekly pamphlets.

Newman had been sorting his papers and letters in view of someday needing to defend himself, but had only got to 1836. He asked old friends, including those from the Oxford Movement, to check his pamphlets for accuracy. He thought it providential that he had recently got back in touch with some of his Anglican friends, though he worried about asking for their help since his work would unintentionally portray Anglicanism in a negative light. However, Newman made an effort to portray both friends and enemies fairly, for which they were grateful.

Newman described the writing as "the most arduous work" and "one of the most terrible trials" he had ever had, and said that he had been "constantly in tears" while writing. He frequently rewrote sections to shorten them, and spent long hours writing, quipping that "[his] fingers have been walking nearly 20 miles a day". One day, he wrote for 22 hours straight in order to have the manuscript ready for the printer to collect the next morning. He found it stressful to be under a weekly deadline, needing to both write and proofread, and joked that "the proof almost got ahead of the manuscript, if that can be".

The first pamphlet was published on Thursday 21 April, followed weekly by six more. An eighth pamphlet, an appendix, appeared on 16 June, two weeks after the seventh. All eight pamphlets were then published together in a single volume later that June under the title Apologia Pro Vita Sua: Being a Reply to a Pamphlet Entitled "What, Then, Does Dr. Newman Mean?".

Hilaire Belloc penned a preface to a later edition of the Apologia.

== Content ==
The first two parts, entitled "Mr. Kingsley's Method of Disputation" and "True Mode of Meeting Mr. Kingsley" respectively, were written to gain the reader's sympathy in preparation for the following parts, and were relatively short (about 27 pages each) and light in style. In them, Newman depicts Kingsley as not intelligent enough to understand Newman, like a child trying to understand the thoughts of an adult, and accuses him of making unprovoked charges without evidence, contrary to the English sense of justice.

The third through sixth parts deal with Newman's life, and ran longer than the first two parts, with the third being about 50 pages and the rest even longer. They do not form an autobiography in the usual sense, dealing little with his personal or spiritual life, but are rather, as he called it, a history of his opinions. The third part deals with his early life, including the formation of his religious opinions and his desire to reform the Anglican Church to prevent it from falling into apostasy. It ends with John Keble's sermon "National Apostasy", given 14 July 1833, which Newman regarded as the beginning of the Oxford Movement.

The fourth part continues through the year 1839. It details the growth of the Oxford Movement and Newman's development of the Via Media theory in his books Prophetical Office and Lectures on Justification. During this time, he began to think about the relationship of this theory with the Anglican Thirty-nine Articles.

The fifth part details the years from 1839 to 1841. In this time, Newman's first doubts about the Anglican Church began to arise through his study of the Monophysite conflict; he saw Anglicans in the same position in his time as the heretical Monophysites stood in the fifth century. This part also covers the publication of Tract 90, in which he attempted to reconcile the Thirty-nine Articles with Catholicism. It ends with "three blows that broke" him in 1841: the renewal of his doubts by seeing an analogy between Anglicans and the heretical semi-Arians; the condemnation of Tract 90 by the Anglican bishops; and the approval of the Anglo-Prussian bishopric in Jerusalem, which Newman saw as approval of Protestant heresies.

The sixth part, covering 1841 through 1845, deals with his withdrawal from public life to his chapel at Littlemore. While there, he tried to keep Anglicans in the Anglican Church, but soon came to accept Catholic doctrines. During the last two years, he retracted anti-Catholic statements in his previous writings, and began to share his thoughts with his friends. It ends with him leaving Littlemore.

The seventh part, "General Answer to Mr. Kingsley", deals with his theological opinions at the time of writing. It was added in response to a concern that, while Newman was adequately defending himself from the charge of dishonesty, he was not defending the Church as a whole. In this part, Newman analyzes the teaching of Alphonsus Ligouri on lying and equivocation and compares it to that of some Protestants. He also gives his opinions on the infallibility of the Church and its relationship with theology, indirectly speaking against more extreme Catholic views. He ends this part with a dedication to the other members of the Birmingham Oratory, thanking them for their support through the years.

In the appendix, entitled "Answer in Detail to Mr. Kingsley's Accusations", Newman casts Kingsley's charges as 39 "blots", mirroring the Anglican Thirty-nine Articles. He responds to each accusation in the polemical tone of the first two parts, lest he be accused of evading the charges.

== Reception and aftermath ==
The Apologia was enormously successful. Though Newman had initially expected to lose money on it, as he had on previous publications, the book sold so well that Newman's money troubles were relieved. Newman's defence of his honesty as an Anglican was accepted by the public, and the book marked a turning point in Newman's reputation; he became even more popular and well-known than he had during the Oxford Movement.

Newman's defence of the Catholic priesthood was lauded by his fellow priests. At a synod in his own diocese of Birmingham at the beginning of June, Newman received a grateful address signed by the priests of the diocese and a letter from the bishop, William Bernard Ullathorne. Newman included these and similar letters from other groups of priests and academics in an appendix of the revised edition of the Apologia.

The Apologia had a positive effect on the relations between Protestants and Catholics. Catholics gained a greater understanding of the Protestant mindset, and Protestants saw that it was possible for a reasonable person to accept Catholicism in good faith, which caused them to soften the tone used in public controversy; though Catholics might be wrong in their beliefs, they were at least not dishonest. Nonconformist Protestants in particular received the Apologia positively, and Anglicans were grateful for Newman's kind portrayal of the Anglican Church. Anglo-Catholics, unhappy with the way Newman had been treated by Anglican authorities, rejoiced in his vindication.

Some Protestant readers, however, saw their negative impressions of Catholicism confirmed by Newman's revelations. While accepting his honesty, they derided him as succumbing to superstition and idolatry, and even delusion and self-deception. His defence of Ligouri's position on lying was seen as unconvincing. Some Catholics took issue with his positive portrayal of the Anglican Church, and scholastic theologians objected to his language about probability and certainty.

Kingsley had gone to France at his wife's insistence after publishing his pamphlet and was unaware of Newman's response until shortly before he returned home. Though Macmillan asked Kingsley to reply to the Apologia, Kingsley declined, calling Newman a "treacherous ape" and implying that he was insane. On Kingsley's death in 1875, Newman wrote that he had never borne any ill will toward Kingsley, only writing as harshly as he did because he knew from experience that no one would take him seriously if he responded calmly.

In the Apologia Newman spoke of a tactic he called "poisoning the wells", coining the term for the fallacy now known as poisoning the well.

== Revision ==
In June 1865, Newman published a second, revised edition of the Apologia under the title History of My Religious Opinions. The controversy with Kingsley having run its course, Newman toned down the polemical parts, and Kingsley was no longer mentioned by name. Newman replaced the first two parts with a preface adapted from the second part, and the detailed reply to Kingsley in the appendix with an expanded series of notes. The seventh part, originally titled "General Answer to Mr. Kingsley", was renamed "Position of My Mind since 1845".

In addition to these revisions, Newman specified certain dates more precisely and included the names of individuals whom he had previously omitted. This change reflected the lack of danger, following the success of the Apologia, in associating them with him and potentially harming their reputations. Errors in the original were also fixed, and some phrasing was clarified.

Newman made other minor changes and corrections to the text at various points after the 1865 edition, and expanded the preface and notes. The title was changed back to Apologia Pro Vita Sua in 1873, but with the subtitle "Being a History of his Religious Opinions". The Apologia reached its final form around 1886.
