= Arthur Philip Perceval =

English high church Anglican cleric, royal chaplain and theological writer

Arthur Philip Perceval (22 November 1799 – 11 June 1853) was an English high church Anglican cleric, royal chaplain and theological writer.

== Life ==
Born on 22 November 1799, he was the fifth and youngest son of Charles George Perceval, 2nd Baron Arden, by his wife Margaret Elizabeth, eldest daughter of Sir Thomas Spencer Wilson. He matriculated at Oriel College, Oxford, on 19 March 1817, graduating B.A. in 1820 and B.C.L. in 1824; from 1821 to 1825 he was fellow of All Souls College.

On 18 June 1824 he was appointed rector of East Horsley, Surrey. In 1826 he became chaplain to George IV, and continued royal chaplain to William IV and Queen Victoria until his death. He supported the Tractarian movement at Oxford, and in 1841 published a Vindication of the Authors of the Tracts for the Times, principally defending John Henry Newman against attacks made on his Tract 90. On 24 July 1838, when preaching as royal chaplain at the Chapel Royal, St. James's, he advocated High Church principles before the queen. Charles Blomfield, bishop of London, who was aware of Perceval's intention, is said to have preached for several Sundays in order to keep Perceval out of the pulpit, but the bishop broke his collarbone, and Perceval found his opportunity.

Perceval died on 11 June 1853, having married, on 15 December 1825, Charlotte Anne, eldest daughter of the Rev. and Hon. Augustus George Legge, fifth son of William Legge, 2nd Earl of Dartmouth; she died on 21 June 1856, having had, with other issue, three sons and four daughters.

== Works ==
Perceval was a voluminous author, mostly of letters, sermons, and pamphlets. His works include:

- A Christian Peace-Offering; Being an Endeavour to Abate the Asperities of the Controversy between the Roman and English Catholic Churches 1829
- Reasons Why I Am Not a Member of the Bible Society, 1830
- Letter to the Reverend James Slade, Containing Remarks on His Letter to the Lord Bishop of London, on the Subject of Church Reform, 1831
- A Letter to Lord Henley Respecting His Publication on Church Reform, 1832
- A Letter to the Right Honourable Earl Grey, on the Obligation of the Coronation Oath, 1832
- On the Expected Dissolution of Parliament: An Address to the Members of the Church of England Entitled to Vote for Members of Parliament, 1833
- High Christian Principle the Only Safeguard, and the Church of Christ Invulnerable: A Sermon Preached in the Chapel Royal, St. James's, 1833
- An Address to the Deans and Chapters of the Cathedral Churches in England and Wales, on the Election of Bishops: to Which is Prefixed, a Prayer for the Orthodox Catholics, while their Church is Under Persecution, 1833
- A Clergyman's Defence of Himself, for Refusing to Use the Office for the Burial of the Dead over One Who Destroyed Himself, Notwithstanding the Coroner's Verdict of Mental Derangement, 1833
- Observations on the Proposed Alterations, and Present System, of the Society for Promoting Christian Knowledge, with Suggestions for Its Improvement, 1834
- Historical Notices Concerning Some of the Peculiar Tenets of the Church of Rome, 1836
- Reasons for Withdrawing the Clergy Remonstrance, 1839
- The Roman Schism illustrated from the Records of the Catholic Church, 1836
- The Origin of Church Rates, 1837
- The Christian Priesthood, and the Church of England, 1838
- The Original Services for the State Holidays, 1838
- Sermons preached chiefly at the Chapel Royal, St. James's, 1839
- Questions and Answers on Christian Baptism, 1841
- An Apology for the Doctrine of Apostolical Succession, 1839; 2nd edit. 1841
- A Vindication of the Principles of the Authors of "The Tracts for the Times" 1841
- A Collection of Papers connected with the Theological Movement of 1833, 1842; 2nd edit. 1843
- On Subscription to the XXXIX Articles, 1842
- A Vindication of the Proceedings Relative to the Mission of Bishop Alexander to Jerusalem, 1843
- On the Use of the Irish Language in Religious Worship and Instruction (1844)
- Plain Lectures on the Gospel According to St. Matthew, 1845
- Three Sermons Preached in Times of Public Anxiety, 1845
- Results of an Ecclesiastical Tour in Holland and Northern Germany, 1846.
- Plain Lectures on the Epistle of Paul the Apostle to the Ephesians, 1846
- A Letter to Lord John Russell, on National Education, 1847
- A Question for the Present Crisis: Who Are the Queen's Constitutional Advisers?, 1848
- A Letter to the Members of the Peace Society, 1849
- Origines Hibernicæ, Dublin, 1849 (in this he endeavours to prove that Ireland is the Patmos of Revelation, and that the Virgin Mary was buried on Tara Hill)
- A Letter to the Bishop of Exeter, with Remarks on the Resolutions of the Archdeacon of Chichester, and a Note on Dr. Wiseman, 1850
- Result of a First Endeavour to Re-establish, in Germany, the Ancient Ecclesiastical Missions from England and Ireland, in 1846-1847, 1850
- The Use of Lights on the Communion Table in the Day Time, 1851
- On the Use of the Crucifix, 1851
- Thoughts on the Delayed Interment of the Remains of the Late Duke of Wellington, 1852
