= Benjamin Harrison (priest) =

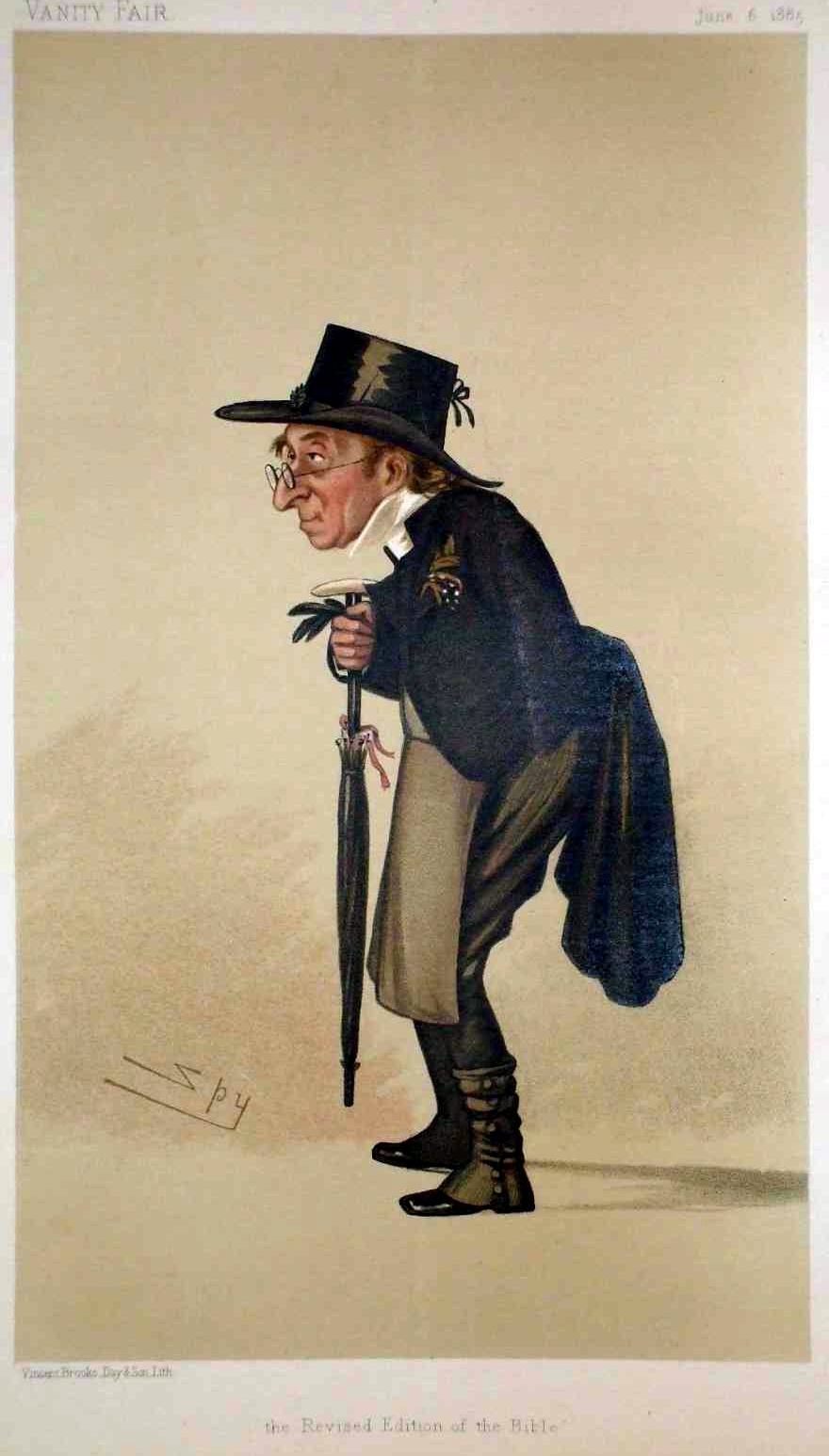
Caricature by Spy published in Vanity Fair in 1885.

Benjamin Harrison (1808–1887) was an Anglican clergyman and ecclesiastical administrator. His father was Benjamin Harrison, Treasurer of Guy's Hospital.

Harrison was educated at Christ Church, Oxford (matriculated 1826; Student 1828). He took his BA in 1830 and his MA in 1833 and achieved significant distinctions in classics, theology, and Hebrew. He was ordained deacon in 1832 and priest in 1833 and taught at Oxford for the next ten years, particularly specialising in Hebrew. During this time he became involved in the early years of the Oxford Movement, writing numbers 16, 17, 24, and 49 of the Tracts for the Times.

His ecclesiastical career outside the University started in 1842 when he was made one of the Six Preachers at Canterbury Cathedral. In 1843 he was appointed domestic chaplain to William Howley, archbishop of Canterbury. Howley appointed him in 1845 to the post of Archdeacon of Maidstone and to a canonry at Canterbury Cathedral, posts which he retained until his death.

In 1841 he married Isabella Thornton, daughter of the late Henry Thornton MP, one of the founders of the Clapham Sect.

He was very active as a residentiary canon at Canterbury where "he proved to be an energetic and popular archdeacon. Friendly to the clergy and regular in his attendance at cathedral services, he was actively involved in church societies and keenly participated in secular gatherings, such as those of the Canterbury cricket week or the meetings of the agricultural and archaeological societies."

Following his death in 1887, Isabella Thornton gave his considerable library, consisting of some 16,000 books and pamphlets, to Canterbury Cathedral where it is housed in the old 17th-century library, renamed the Bibliotheca Howley-Harrisoniana (Howley-Harrison Library) after Harrison and his patron.
