= John Walter Lea =

Christian author

John Walter Lea (1827 - 29 February 1888) was a prominent lay Church of England author affiliated with the later Tractarian Movement. He was a fellow of the Royal Historical Society and the Geological Society of London. The younger of a pair of twins (his brother died during childbirth), Lea was born at Blakebrook, Kidderminster with one arm, and this was considered an impediment to ordination in the Church of England. He received the B.A. at Wadham College, Oxford in 1848. He was a major figure in the early activities of the English Church Union, on the council of which he served from 1871 to 1888. He died in St Mary's Church, Plaistow.

== Works ==
- Confession and Absolution: The Doctrine of the Church of England, and Her Provision for the Relief of Her Perplexed Children as Delivered to Us in the Book of Common Prayer (Oxford and London: John Henry Parker, 1853)
- The Principles of Ecclesiastical Jurisdiction: With Special Reference to the Authority of the Anglican Episcopate (London: J.T. Hayes, 1866)
- Church and State (London: Thomas Bosworth, 1867)
- The Judgment of the Judicial Committee in the S. Alban's Ritual Case (London: Church Press, 1869)
- The Synod, the Bishops, and Dr. Temple: A Letter to the Right Rev. the Lord Bishop of Rochester (London: Church Press, 1869)
- The Laity and the Synods of the Church (London: English Church Union, 1872)
- Defence, Not Defiance: Renewed Prosecutions, and the Curate Question. A Letter, Addressed (by Permission) to the Rt. Rev. the Lord Bishop of Chichester (London: Church Printing, 1873)
- The Evidence of the Primitive Church as to the Admission of the Laity Into Ecclesiastical Synods (London: A. Brown, 1873)
- Non-Communicating Attendance: The Judgment of the Canonists on the Eighth and Ninth Apostolical Canons and the Second Canon of the Council of Antioch, in the Œcumenical Code, Uncontroversially Investigated (1873)
- The Sanctity of Marriage (London: H.S. King, 1874)
- The Bishops' Oath of Homage (London: Rivingtons, 1875)
- Christian Marriage: Its Open and Secret Enemies in England at the Present Day (London: Skeffington, 1881)
- The Succession of Spiritual Jurisdiction in Every See of the Catholic Church in England at the Epochs of the Reformation and Revolution, Exhibited in a Series of Tables (London: Wells Gardner, Darton & Co., 1881)
