= Richard William Church =

English cleric and writer (1815–1890)

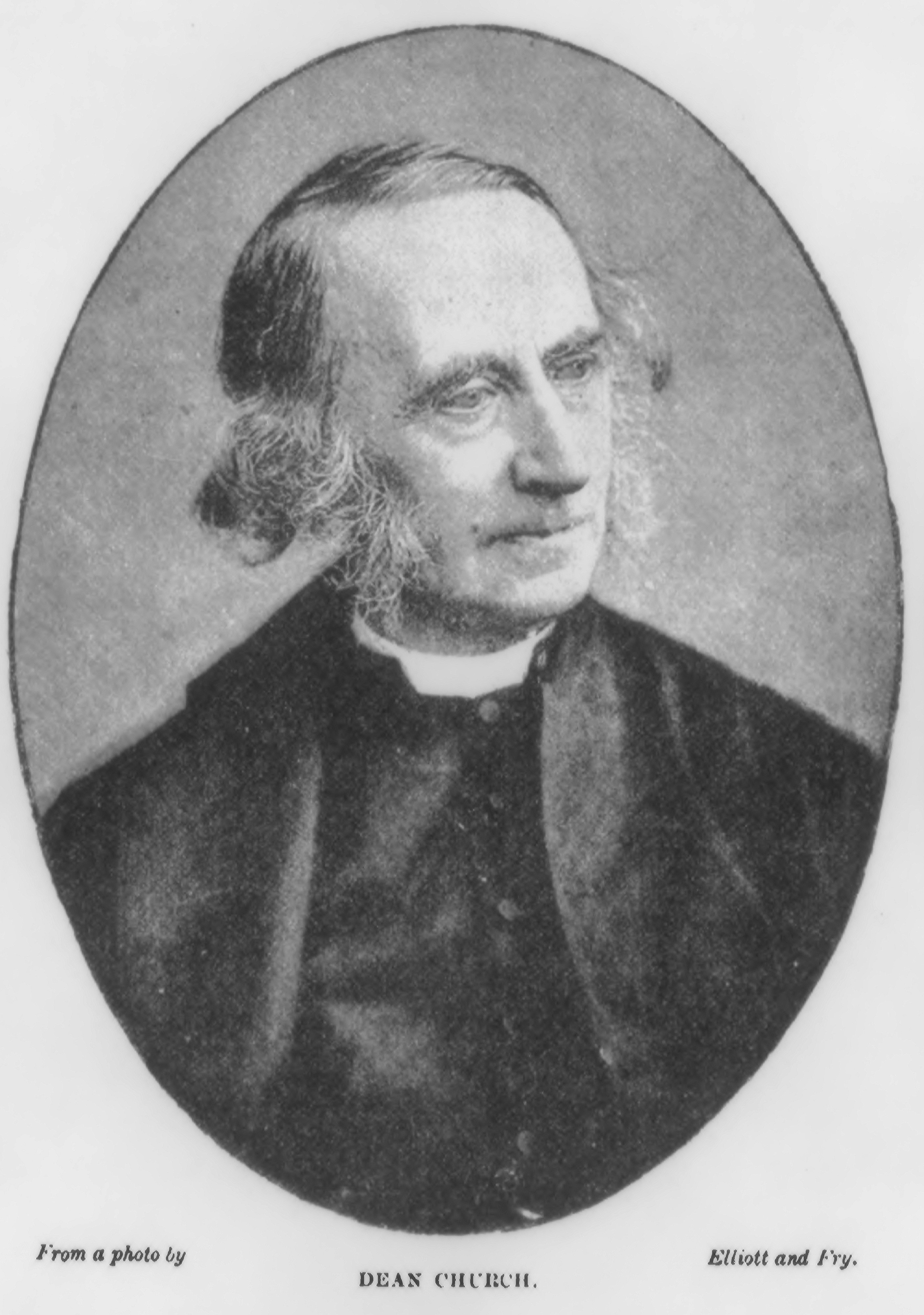

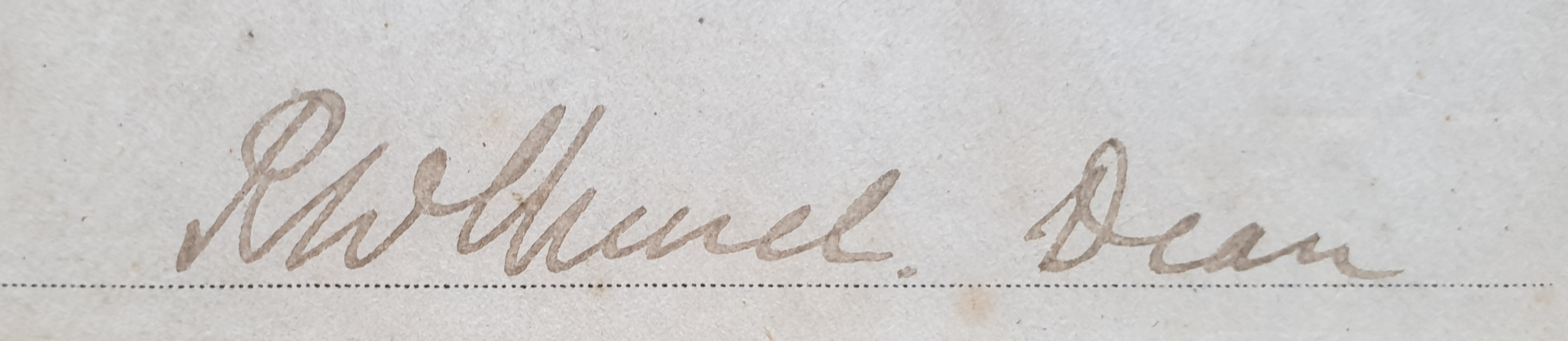
Signature of Church (1885) on a Bible given to Charles W. Perfect by St Paul's Cathedral in Midsummer 1885.

Richard William Church (25 April 1815 – 9 December 1890) was an English cleric and writer, known latterly as Dean Church. He was a close friend of John Henry Newman and allied with the Tractarian movement. Later he moved from Oxford academic life to some prominence in the Church of England.

== Life ==
Richard William was the eldest of three sons of John Dearman Church, a wine merchant, and his wife Bromley Caroline Metzener (died 1845). His grandfather Matthew Church, a merchant of Cork, and his wife, were Quakers, and John was not baptised into the Church of England until his marriage in 1814. His uncle, General Sir Richard Church (1784–1873), achieved fame as a liberator of Greece.

The family moved in 1818 to Florence. After his father's death in 1828, his mother settled in Bath and he was sent to a strict evangelical school at Redland, Bristol. He was admitted in 1832 to Wadham College, Oxford, and took first-class honours in 1836. His mother, meanwhile, was remarried to Thomas Crokat, a widowed Englishman of Leghorn.

In 1838, Church was elected fellow of Oriel College. One of his contemporaries, Richard Mitchell, commented on his election: "There is such a moral beauty about Church that they could not help taking him." He was appointed a tutor of Oriel in 1839 and ordained the same year. He was a close friend of John Henry Newman in this period and allied to the Tractarian movement. In 1841, Tract 90 of Tracts for the Times appeared and Church resigned his tutorship.

From 1844 to 1845, Church was a junior proctor, and in that capacity and in concert with his senior colleague, vetoed a proposal to censure Tracts publicly. In 1846, with others, he started The Guardian newspaper and he was an early contributor to The Saturday Review. In 1850, he became engaged to H. F. Bennett, of a Somersetshire family, a niece of George Moberly, Bishop of Salisbury. After again holding the tutorship of Oriel, he accepted in 1858 the small living of Whatley in Somerset near Frome and was married the following year. He was said to be a diligent parish priest and a serious student, who contributed largely to current literature.

== Dean of St Paul's ==
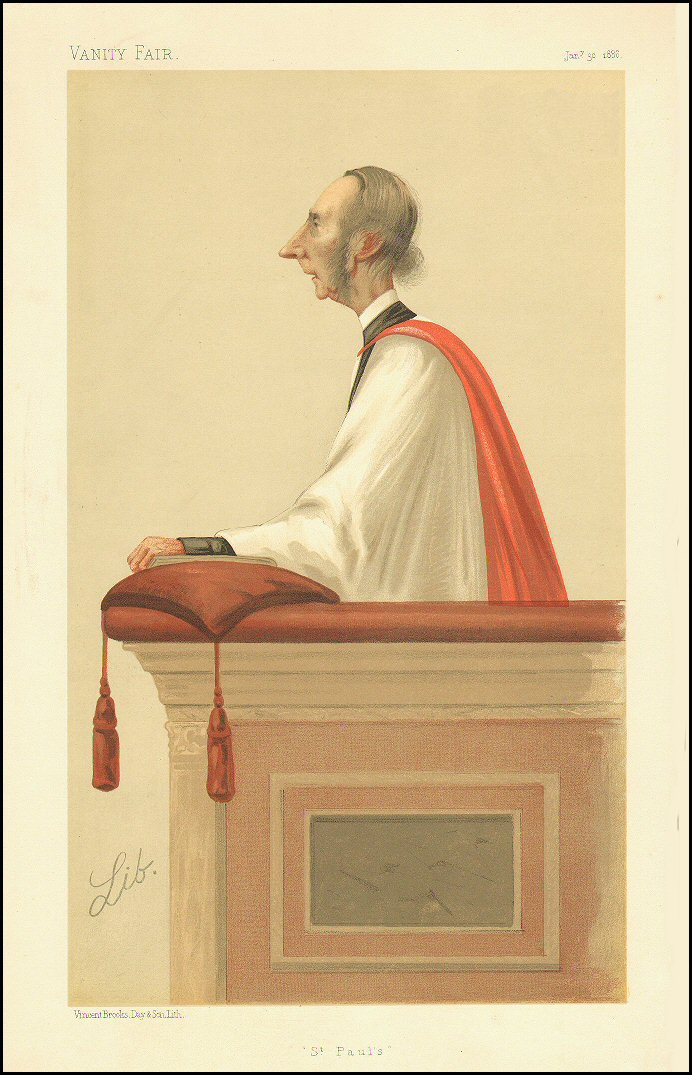
"St Paul's". Caricature by Lib published in Vanity Fair in 1886.

In 1869, Church declined a canonry at Worcester, but in 1871 accepted reluctantly (calling it "a sacrifice en pure perte"), the deanery of St Paul's, to which he was nominated by W. E. Gladstone. There his task was complicated:

1. Restoration of the cathedral,
2. Adjustment of the question of the cathedral revenues with the Ecclesiastical Commissioners,
3. Reorganization of a conservative cathedral staff with anomalous vested rights.

Church intended on his appointment "that St Paul's should waken up from its long slumber". The first year he spent there, writes one of his friends, was one of "misery" for a man who loved study and hated pomp and business. But he worked tactfully. Though of unimpressive stature and monotonous, he had a strong influence. He was a High Churchman, but of a rational type, and with an enthusiasm for religious liberty. He said of the Church of England that there was "no more glorious church in Christendom than this inconsistent English Church". He was regarded in 1882 as a possible successor to Archbishop Tait, but his health made it out of the question. While Dean of St Paul's, he was a patron of Saint Martin's League for letter carriers.

== Death ==
In 1888, Church's only son Frederick John died. Thereafter his own health declined. He appeared for the last time in public at the funeral of Henry Parry Liddon on 9 September 1890. Church himself died on 9 December 1890, at Dover. He was buried at Whatley.

== Works ==
The dean's chief published works are Life of St Anselm (1870), lives of Spenser (1879) and Bacon (1884) in Macmillan's "Men of Letters" series, Dante: an Essay (1878), The Oxford Movement (1891), and many other volumes of essays and sermons. His Dante: an Essay included an English version of Dante's De monarchia, translated by his son Frederick.

A collection of Church's journalistic articles was published in 1897 as Occasional Papers. His style is lucid but austere. He stated that he had never studied style as such, but had acquired it by the exercise of translation from classical languages, and that he took care in his choice of verbs rather than in his use of adjectives.
