= National Apostasy =

1833 sermon by John Keble

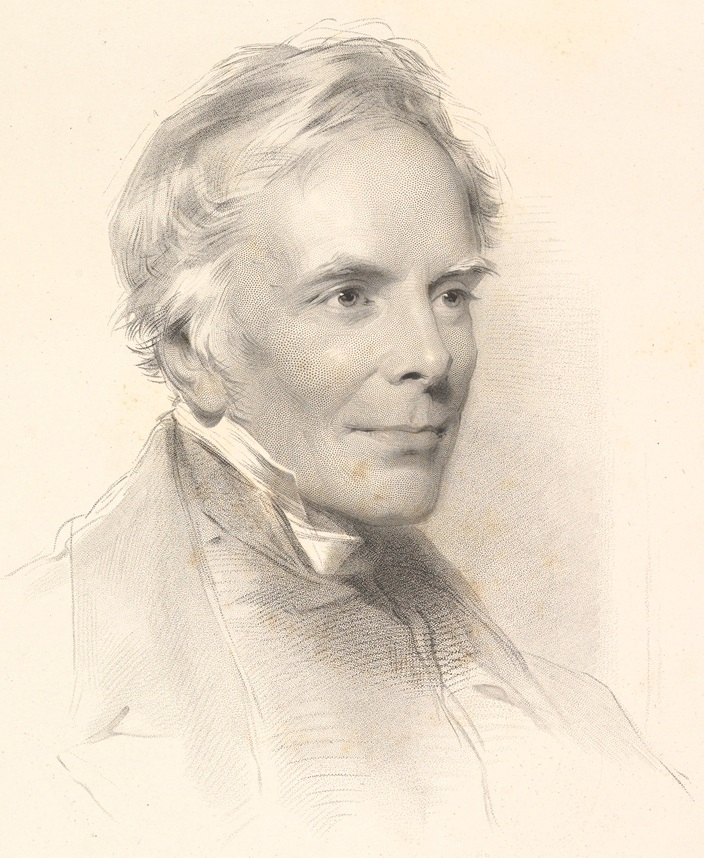
Portrait of John Keble

"National Apostasy" was a sermon preached by John Keble at the University Church of St Mary, Oxford, on 14 July 1833. The sermon has traditionally been considered as the beginning of the Oxford Movement of high church Anglicans, also known as the Tractarians.

== Background ==
The previous five years had seen radical changes to the nature of the relationship between the Church of England and the state. In 1828 the centuries-old discrimination against Protestant Dissenters was repealed and in 1829 Catholic Emancipation was passed. In 1830 the Pittite Tory regime fell and the first Whig government in a generation took office, dedicated to reform.

Many Anglican churchmen, after the Whig triumph of the Reform Act 1832, believed that the Whigs were preparing to invade the rights and alter the constitution of the Church. In 1833 the Whigs passed the Church Temporalities Act 1833 (3 & 4 Will. 4. c. 37). This reorganised the Church of Ireland and reduced its bishoprics from 22 to 12. This seemed to justify Anglican fears that the government was prepared to act against church opinion.

== Content ==
The text of the sermon was 1 Samuel 12:23: "As for me, God forbid that I should sin against the Lord in ceasing to pray for you: but I will teach you the good and the right way".

Keble began by discussing the nature of sin and God's punishment. He observed that it was possible for a traditionally Christian nation, seeing the successes of more secular countries, to turn away from Christianity. This movement, he argued, was always traceable to a "decay or want of faith" that takes hold of those, like the Israelites of the prophet Samuel's time, who see that established institutions and religious principle have not brought worldly success. Modern people, too, wanted to indulge their "intrusive passions", and would easily find "precedent and permission" to do so. Religious indifferentism was an example of this tendency in modern times, embodied not just in "public measures" of toleration but in a general "spirit which leads men to exult in every step of that kind". But these were the "omens and tokens of an Apostate Mind in a nation".

He pointed to a broader tendency to reject the claims of Christian religion on public policy, renouncing any "checks from Christian principles attempted to be enforced on ... public conduct". Furthermore, there had been "observable a growing disinclination, on the part of those bound by voluntary oaths, to whatever reminds them of their obligation". This, Keble said, amounted to "profane dislike of God's awful Presence; a general tendency, as a people, to leave Him out of all their thoughts". Turning to the words of Jesus in Luke 10:16—"He that heareth you, heareth Me; and he that despiseth you, despiseth Me"—Keble saw this attitude of "disrespect to the Successors of the Apostles" as an "unquestionable symptom of enmity" to God. He warned political leaders not to sacrifice religious principle to political expediency, citing the cautionary example of Saul.

Keble concluded by offering practical advice to his listeners. If England should apostasise, he said, the children of the church must act like Samuel towards the Israelites, praying for the country and calmly remonstrating. He warned against rebellion: "Submission and order are still duties. They were so in the days of pagan persecution; and the more of loyal and affectionate feeling we endeavour to mingle with our obedience, the better." Instead, Keble called on his listeners to show forth their Christian principles through "piety, purity, charity, justice". He ended his sermon by exhorting his congregation to show courage in the face of "anti-Christian powers", and to dedicate themselves to the cause of the apostolic church.

== Historical evaluation ==
The following Sunday, July 14th, Mr. Keble preached the Assize Sermon in the University Pulpit. It was published under the title of 'National Apostasy'. I have ever considered and kept the day, as the start of the religious movement of 1833.

— John Henry Newman, Apologia Pro Vita Sua

Historians are divided in their assessment of the sermon's importance. Some, such as R. W. Church in his classic study of the Oxford Movement, have followed Newman in regarding it as the beginning of the Oxford Movement. Others, including F. L. Cross and Owen Chadwick, have disputed its significance. While maintaining that the sermon was important to Newman personally, Chadwick notes that the copy of the sermon delivered to the Tractarian leader E. B. Pusey was still uncut—that is, unopened—at the time of Pusey's death almost fifty years later. Kirstie Blair, discussing the history of English sermon-writing at the time, describes the sermon as better known for Newman's characterisation of it than for its own merits.
