= Benjamin Harrison (hospital administrator) =

Hospital treasurer

Benjamin Harrison (1771–1856) was an English hospital administrator, known as an influential treasurer of Guy's Hospital in London.

== Life ==
The fourth son of Benjamin Harrison (1734–1797), also treasurer of Guy's Hospital (himself second son of Sir Thomas Harrison (1700–1765), chamberlain of the city of London), he was born at West Ham on 29 July 1771. He lived for twelve years with his father at Guy's, and succeeded him in the treasurership in 1797.

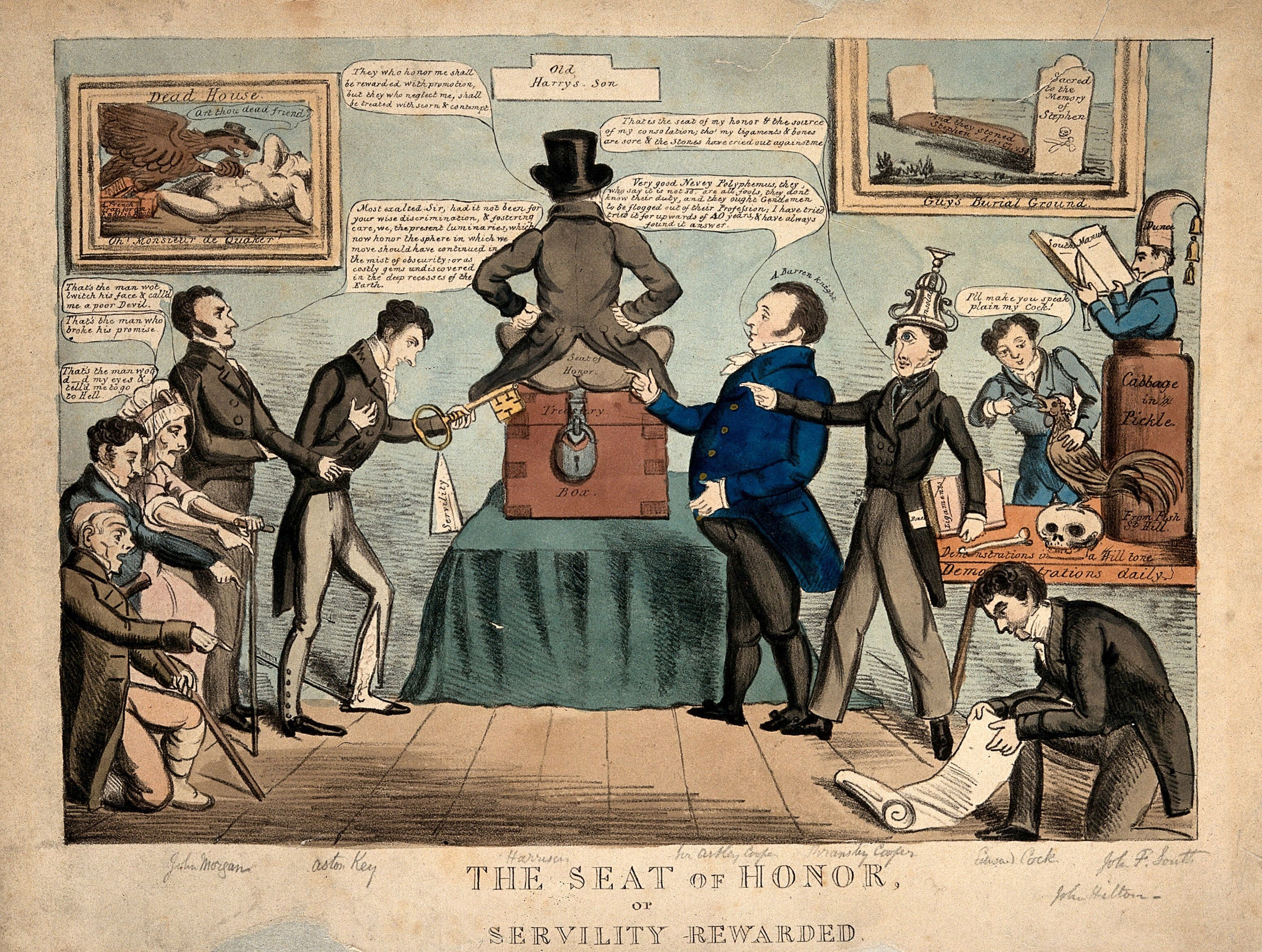
Caricature depicting Benjamin Harrison as a king on a throne, with his subjects prostrating themselves.

For fifty years Harrison governed the hospital and managed its estates, despotically and without salary. With Sir Astley Cooper he, in 1825, established Guy's as a complete medical school separate from St. Thomas's Hospital, with which it had always previously been allied.

Harrison resented an inquiry into the hospital administration which was made by charity commissioners in 1837, but no abuses were discovered. He was a Fellow of the Society of Antiquaries of London, deputy governor of the Hudson's Bay Company and South Sea Company, and chairman of the Exchequer Loan Board. He was selected as one of the three appeal commissioners for the city of London on the first imposition of an income tax.

Towards the end of his life, Harrison lived at Clapham Common and was closely connected with the Clapham sect. He died there on 18 May 1856, aged 84.

== Family ==
Harrison married in 1797 Mary, daughter of H. H. Le Pelly of Upton and Aveley, Essex. They had three sons, the eldest, Benjamin Harrison, becoming archdeacon of Maidstone; and six daughters, the eldest of whom married William Cripps.

== Honours ==
Harrison Lake, the largest lake in the southern Coast Mountains of Canada, was named after Benjamin Harrison by Hudson's Bay Company's Governor Simpson.
