= John Bowden (banker) =

Governor of the Bank of England (1764–1844)

- Born: 1764; Lisbon, Portugal
- Died: 25 June 1844 (aged 80); Grosvenor Place, London
- Occupations: Banker, Governor of the Bank of England from 1822 to 1824
- Children: John William Bowden

John Bowden (bapt. 12 August 1764 – 25 June 1844) was an English banker who was Governor of the Bank of England from 1822 to 1824. He had been Deputy Governor from 1820 to 1822. He replaced Charles Pole as Governor and was succeeded by Cornelius Buller.

Bowden was born in Lisbon to banker Daniel Bowden and Katherine Henessy. He was the father of John William Bowden.

== See also ==
- Chief Cashier of the Bank of England
