= Isaac Williams (writer) =

Member of the Oxford Movement and writer

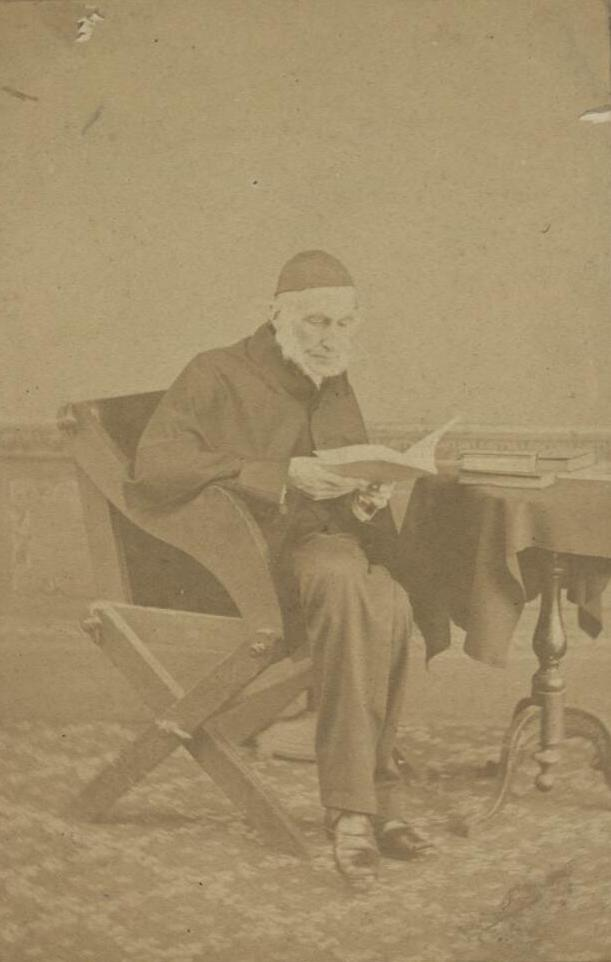
portrait from the Welsh Portrait Collection at the National Library of Wales, c. 1864.

The Reverend Isaac Williams (1802–1865) was a prominent member of the Oxford Movement (or "Tractarians"), a student and disciple of John Keble and, like the other members of the movement, associated with Oxford University. A prolific writer, Williams wrote poetry and prose including the well known Tract: "On Reserve in Communicating Religious Knowledge".

== Life ==
Williams was the son of a Welsh Chancery barrister who spent much of his time in London. The Williams family had a home, Cwmcynfelin, in Llangorwen, Cardiganshire, from which Isaac would walk to Oxford and other destinations. He is associated with the establishment there of a distinct parish separated from that of Llanbadarn Fawr. He was educated at Harrow School and Trinity College, Oxford, where as an undergraduate he gained the Latin verse prize and thus came to the notice of John Keble.

In 1829 he was ordained as curate of Windrush, a Gloucestershire village not far from John Keble's home at Fairford. He then returned to Oxford to assist John Henry Newman, a leading member of the Tractarians, as his curate at St Mary's Church, Oxford. In spite of a poor degree he was elected as a fellow and tutor at his Oxford college. In 1836, he served as curate of the chapel at Littlemore.

In 1841, he was suggested as John Keble's successor as the Professor of Poetry at Oxford. Due to the furore raised by Newman's Tract XC, and Williams' association with the Oxford Movement, the election became a referendum on Tractarianism, the beliefs and writings of the Movement. Williams in Tract LXXX, "On Reserve in Communicating Religious Knowledge" had espoused a distinctly Catholic position in terms of ecclesiology and sacramental theology. The controversy created became so heated that Williams withdrew his name and James Garbett was given the position.

In 1842 Williams married Caroline Champernowne and the couple moved to Bisley, Gloucestershire, where he worked as a curate to Thomas Keble. In 1846 he became seriously ill and, although he recovered, he was left practically incapacitated and unable to continue active work in the parish. He therefore moved to Stinchcombe, Gloucestershire, where his brother-in-law, Sir George Prevost, a fellow Tractarian, was the vicar. He lived there until his death in 1865. His grave may be found in the churchyard of St. Cyr in the village of Stinchcombe.

== Writings ==
- The Cathedral, or, The Catholic and Apostolic Church in England. (Oxford : John Henry Parker, 1838)
- The Baptistery, or the way of eternal life / by the author of "The cathedral." (Oxford : J.H. Parker; London : Rivingtons, 1842–1844)
- Thoughts in Past Years. (Oxford: John Henry Parker. London: J.G. and F. Rivington, 1838)
- Indications of a Superintending Providence in the Preservation of the Prayer Book and in the Changes Which It Has Undergone. (London: Printed for J.G. & F. Rivington, 1839.
- Tract Number 80—On Reserve in Communicating Religious Knowledge.
- Tract Number 87—On Reserve in Communicating Religious Knowledge. (continued)
- The Altar; or Meditations in Verse on the Great Christian Sacrifice (London: Joseph Masters, 1849)
- The Christian Scholar. (Oxford: John Henry Parker, 1849.)
- The Seven Days: Or, The Old and New Creation. (Oxford and London: James Parker, 1850)
- A Harmony of the Four Evangelists. (London: F. & J. Rivington, 1850)
- Plain Sermons on the Catechism. (London: F. & J. Rivington, 1851)
- Plain Sermons on the Latter Part of the Catechism. (London: F. & J. Rivington, 1851.)
- The Apocalypse with Notes and Reflections. (London: Francis & John Rivington, 1852.)
- A Series of Sermons on the Epistle and Gospel for Each Sunday in the Year and the Holy Days of the Church. (London: Rivingtons, 1855.)
- Sermons on the Characters of the Old Testament. (London: Rivingtons, 1856)
- Female Characters of Holy Scripture, in a Series of Sermons. (London: Rivingtons, 1859)
- The Beginning of the Book of Genesis, with Notes and Reflections. (London: Rivingtons, 1861)
- The Psalms, Interpreted of Christ. (London and Oxford: Rivingtons, 1864)
- The Autobiography of Isaac Williams, B.D. Edited by Sir George Prevost, Late Archdeacon of Gloucester. (London: Longmans, 1892)
