= Dei Filius =

Dogmatic constitution of the First Vatican Council

Dei Filius is the incipit of the dogmatic constitution of the First Vatican Council on the Catholic faith, which was adopted unanimously, and issued by Pope Pius IX on 24 April 1870.

The constitution set forth the teaching of "the holy Catholic Apostolic Roman Church" on God, revelation and faith.

== Content ==
The dogmatic constitution "deals with faith, reason, and their interrelations".

The document begins by observing that "God, the principle and end of all things, can be known with certainty by the natural light of human reason from created things". However, it then explains that, through divine revelation, this knowledge can more easily be attained "with firm assurance, and with no admixture of error".

Faith and reason are seen as complementary. Following Thomas Aquinas, whose guiding thought Philip Egan paraphrases as that "it is the same God who grounds all truth, whether secular or divine, and the truth is ultimately one", Dei Filius said

there can never be any real discrepancy between faith and reason, since the same God who reveals mysteries and infuses faith has bestowed the light of reason on the human mind; and God can not deny himself, nor can truth ever contradict truth. The false appearance of such a contradiction is mainly due, either to the dogmas of faith not having been understood and expounded according to the mind of the Church, or to the inventions of opinion having been taken for the verdicts of reason.

== Name used for the church ==
The draft presented to the council on 8 March 1870 drew no serious criticism. But a group of 35 English-speaking bishops, who feared that the opening phrase "Sancta Romana Catholica Ecclesia" might be construed as favouring the Anglican branch theory, raised objections to this expression, "Holy Roman Catholic Church". They proposed that the word "Roman" be omitted out of concern that use of the term "Roman Catholic" would lend support to proponents of branch theory. While the council overwhelmingly rejected this proposal, the text was finally modified to read "The Holy Catholic Apostolic and Roman Church".

The words "Sancta Romana Catholica Ecclesia" were voted on three separate dates. On the first occasion, when this chapter alone was considered, two votes concerned the opening words. The first was on a proposal by a few English-speaking bishops to delete the word "Romana", thus changing "Sancta Romana Catholica Ecclesia" (The Holy Roman Catholic Church) to "Sancta Catholica Ecclesia" (The Holy Catholic Church). This was overwhelmingly defeated.

The second vote, held immediately afterwards, was on a proposal to insert a comma, so that "Sancta Romana Catholica Ecclesia" (The Holy Roman Catholic Church) would become "Sancta Romana, Catholica Ecclesia" (The Holy Roman, Catholic Church). This too was defeated, though not as overwhelmingly as the first proposal.

In a later vote, held on 12 April 1870, the text as a whole, which preserved the same opening words, was approved with 515 affirmative votes (placet) and no opposing votes (non placet); but there were 83 placet iuxta modum votes, asking for retouches, many of them regarding the opening words of chapter I.

In view of the reservations thus expressed, the text presented for a final vote and approved unanimously on 24 April changed the order of the words and added "Apostolica", so that "Sancta Romana Catholica Ecclesia" became "Sancta Catholica Apostolica Romana Ecclesia" (The Holy Catholic Apostolic Roman Church).

== Legacy ==
The Second Vatican Council's Dogmatic Constitution on Divine Revelation (Dei verbum, 1965) presented itself as "following in the footsteps of the Council of Trent and of the First Vatican Council" and made a number of references to Dei Filius.

== See also ==
- Dei verbum
- Lumen fidei
