= Branch theory =

Theological proposition

Branch theory is an ecclesiological proposition that the One, Holy, Catholic, and Apostolic Church includes various different Christian denominations whether in formal communion or not.

Anglican proponents of Anglo-Catholic churchmanship who support the theory include only the Roman Catholic, Eastern Orthodox, Oriental Orthodox, Lutheran, Old Catholic, Moravian, Nestorian and Anglican churches as branches. These church bodies have retained the historic episcopate, one of the four essential things which are required for unity with Anglicans. However, other Anglicans, including those of low, broad and high churchmanship, have "followed the major continental Reformers in their doctrine of the true church, identifiable by the authentic ministry of word and sacrament, in their rejection of the jurisdiction of the pope, and in their alliance with the civil authority ('the magistrate')". The Church of England historically considered itself "Protestant and Reformed" and cooperated with the Continental Reformed Churches, participating in the Synod of Dort in 1618–1619. Developed from 1981 to 1984, God's Reign and Our Unity: The Report of the Anglican-Reformed International Commission, promulgated the theology that "In the spirit of the Reformation, Anglicans acknowledge that the true Church exists where the Word is preached and the sacraments are administered properly."

As such, Anglicans have entered into full communion with bodies such as the member churches of the Porvoo Communion and the Mar Thoma Syrian Church. In some countries, Anglicans have merged with Methodists, Presbyterians and Lutherans to form united Protestant Churches, such as the Church of North India, Church of Pakistan, Church of South India, and the Church of Bangladesh; these churches are members of the Anglican Communion, in addition to the World Communion of Reformed Churches. In every case, a condition of full communion and/or merger is that the church bodies of other traditions had to agree to take upon themselves the four marks of the Church which are named in the Chicago-Lambeth Quadrilateral. After the merger, future clergy would be ordained in lines of the historic episcopate.

Other Protestant Christians, including Evangelical Anglicans, generally reject the Anglo-Catholic version of the branch theory and hold a theory in which the Christian Church "has no visible unity" but contains numerous denominations that are "invisibly connected." Fortescue states that "this theory is common among all Protestant bodies, although each one generally holds that it is the purest branch." For Anglicans of evangelical churchmanship, the notion of apostolic continuity is seen as "fidelity to the teaching of the apostles as set out in scripture, rather than in historical or institutional terms" and thus they place focus on "the gospel, and the means by which this is proclaimed, articulated, and reinforced--namely, the ministers of word and sacrament."

In expounding upon branch theory, theologian Paul Evdokimov states that some view each distinct Christian tradition as contributing something special to the whole of Christendom:

The famous "branch theory", according to which each ecclesiastical tradition possesses only part of the truth, so that the true Church will come into being only when they all join; such a belief encourages the "churches" to continue as they are, confirming in their fragmented state, and the final result is Christianity without the Church. Each church, in its more pronounced form, displays, according to its own native spirit, a particular version of the unique revelation. So, for example, Roman Christianity is characterized by filial love and obedience expressed towards the fatherly authority hypostatized in the first Person of the Trinity: the Church is there to teach and to obey. For the Reformed Churches the vital thing is sacramental reverence for the Word; it is the Church's duty to listen and reform itself. The Orthodox treasure the liberty of the children of God that flowers in liturgical communion, while the Church hymns the love of God for the human race.

== Views ==
=== Anglican ===
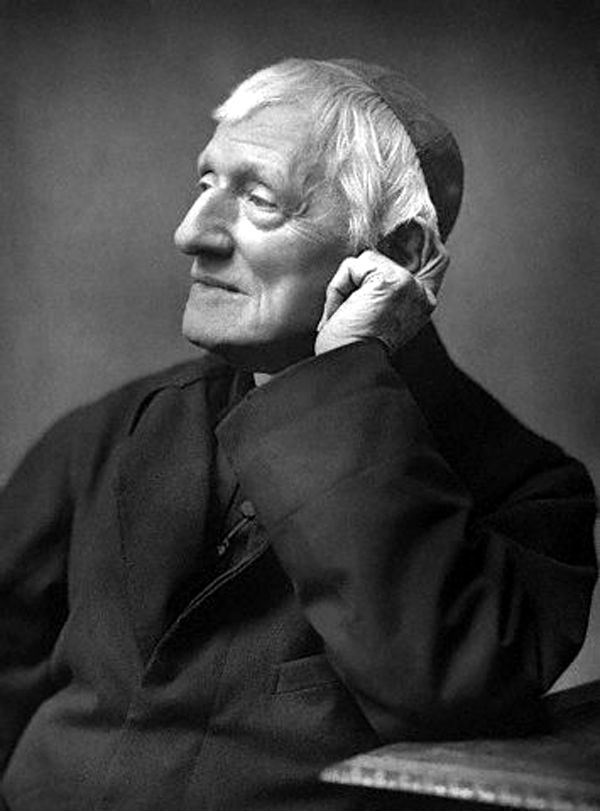
The branch theory was popularized during the Anglican Oxford Movement, of which John Henry Newman was a member. Newman later dropped the conviction and converted to the Catholic Church.

Charles Daubeny (1745–1827) formulated a branch theory in which the One, Holy, Catholic, and Apostolic Church included the Anglican, Scandinavian Lutheran, Roman Catholic and Eastern Orthodox Churches; to this the Oriental Orthodox Churches, Moravian Church, Church of the East, and Old Catholic Churches were also added. The theory was popularized during the Oxford Movement, particularly through the work of the Tractarians. Although the Anglican Roman Catholic International Commission, an organization sponsored by the Anglican Consultative Council and the Pontifical Council for Promoting Christian Unity, seeks to make ecumenical progress between the Roman Catholic Church and the Anglican Communion, it has made no statement on the topic. The theory "has received mixed reception even within the Anglican Communion."

The majority of Anglicans, including those of low church, broad church and high churchmanship, have "followed the major continental Reformers in their doctrine of the true church, identifiable by the authentic ministry of word and sacrament, in their rejection of the jurisdiction of the pope, and in their alliance with the civil authority ('the magistrate')". The Church of England historically considered itself "Protestant and Reformed" and recognized as true churches the Continental Reformed Churches, participating in the Synod of Dort in 1618–1619; in 1567, Edmund Grindal, who became the Church of England's Archbishop of Canterbury, declared that "all reformed churches do differ in rites and ceremonies, but we agree with all reformed churches in substance of doctrine."

As such, Anglicans have entered into full communion with bodies such as the Evangelical Church in Germany and in some countries, have merged with Methodist, Presbyterian and Lutheran denominations to form united Protestant Churches, such as the Church of North India, Church of Pakistan, Church of South India, and the Church of Bangladesh for example. For Anglicans of Evangelical churchmanship, the notion of apostolic continuity is seen as "fidelity to the teaching of the apostles as set out in scripture, rather than in historical or institutional terms" and thus they place focus on "the gospel, and the means by which this is proclaimed, articulated, and reinforced--namely, the ministers of word and sacrament."

=== Catholic ===
The Catholic Church does not accept that those churches separated by schism or heresy are part of the one true church, maintaining that "there exists a single Church of Christ, which subsists in the Catholic Church, governed by the Successor of Peter and by the Bishops in communion with him". Several Popes have explicitly condemned the Anglican "branch theory". The Catholic Church additionally rejects the validity of Anglican Orders, defined formally in 1896 by Pope Leo XIII in the Papal Bull Apostolicae curae, which declares Anglican Orders "absolutely null and utterly void".

Soon after the formulation of the branch theory, in 1864, the Holy Office rejected the branch theory or idea that "the three Christian communions, Catholic, Greek schismatic, and Anglican, however separated and divided from one another, nevertheless with equal right claim for themselves the name "Catholic" and "together now constitute the Catholic Church". In 1870, English bishops attending the First Vatican Council raised objections to the expression Sancta Romana Catholica Ecclesia ("Holy Roman Catholic Church") which appeared in the schema (the draft) of the First Ecumenical Council of the Vatican's Dogmatic Constitution on the Catholic Faith, Dei Filius.

These bishops proposed that the word "Roman" be omitted or at least that commas be inserted between the adjectives, out of concern that use of the term "Roman Catholic" would lend support to proponents of the branch theory. While the council overwhelmingly rejected this proposal, the text was finally modified to read "Sancta Catholica Apostolica Romana Ecclesia" translated into English either as "the holy Catholic Apostolic Roman Church" or, by separating each adjective, as "the holy, Catholic, Apostolic, and Roman Church".

The 2000 declaration Dominus Iesus by the Congregation of the Doctrine of the Faith reaffirmed that "there exists a single Church of Christ, which subsists in the Catholic Church, governed by the Successor of Peter and by the Bishops in communion with him" and that "the Christian faithful are therefore not permitted to imagine that the Church of Christ is nothing more than a collection – divided, yet in some way one – of Churches and ecclesial communities".

=== Eastern Orthodox ===
Non-acceptance of the branch theory by the Eastern Orthodox Church, was in 1853 called unfortunate by the theory's proponent, William Palmer, who wished the Eastern Church to claim to be no more than a part of the whole, not the whole of the true Church. Bishop Kallistos Ware says that "Orthodox writers sometimes speak as if they accepted the 'Branch Theory', once popular among High Church Anglicans", but explains that this opinion "cannot be reconciled with traditional Orthodox theology". Western Orthodox cleric Julian Joseph Overbeck writes:

But what do we see in the Anglican Church? Heresies are not only tolerated and publicly preached from the pulpits, and the schismatical and heretical Church of Rome is by a great many fondled and looked up to, but a theory has sprung up, the so called Branch-Church theory, maintaining that the Catholic Church consists of three branches: the Roman, Greek, and Anglican Churches. Only fancy! the Roman and Greek Churches contradicting and anathematising each other, and the Anglican Church (in its Articles) contradicting both, and besides full of heretical teaching-these are the component parts of the One Catholic Church, the abode of the Spirit of Truth!!! And on this theory rests the "Corporate Reunion of Christendom", which entirely ignores all Apostolic teaching concerning schism and heresy!

In its official declarations, the Eastern Orthodox Church states that the one true church founded by Jesus Christ is a real identifiable entity and that it is singularly the Orthodox Catholic Church. It has identified itself as the "One, Holy, Catholic, and Apostolic Church" in, for instance, synods held in 1836 and 1838 and in its correspondence with Pope Pius IX and Pope Leo XIII. Adrian Fortescue wrote of the Eastern Orthodox: "The idea of a church made up of mutually excommunicate bodies that teach different articles of faith and yet altogether form one Church is as inconceivable to them as it is to us (Catholics)". The Eastern Orthodox Church regards neither Catholics nor Protestants as branches of the "One True Church".

The Eastern Orthodox Church is a part of several ecumenical efforts on international, national, and regional levels, such as the World Council of Churches. With respect to branch theory, some conservative Eastern Orthodox, however, take a decidedly anti-ecumenical stand. For example, in 1983 Metropolitan Philaret (Voznesensky) and the Holy Synod of Bishops of the Russian Orthodox Church Outside Russia stated:

Those who attack the Church of Christ by teaching that Christ's Church is divided into so-called "branches" which differ in doctrine and way of life, or that the Church does not exist visibly, but will be formed in the future when all "branches" or sects or denominations, and even religions will be united into one body; and who do not distinguish the priesthood and mysteries of the Church from those of the heretics, but say that the baptism and eucharist of heretics is effectual for salvation; therefore, to those who knowingly have communion with these aforementioned heretics or who advocate, disseminate, or defend their new heresy of Ecumenism under the pretext of brotherly love or the supposed unification of separated Christians, Anathema!

In addition, the Jubilee Council of 2000 of the Church of Russia also condemned "Divided Church" Ecclesiology or the so-called Branch Theory.

=== Oriental Orthodoxy ===
It is considered by many that the Chalcedonian Schism resulted from a difference in semantics rather than actual doctrine, stating that both non-Chalcedonian and Chalcedonian Christianity share a similar Christology despite choosing to express it in different (Cyrillian vs. Chalcedonian) terms, and theological dialogue has resulted in formal statements of agreement on that issue, which have been officially accepted by groups on both sides. The Orthodoxy Cognate PAGE Society (Society for Orthodox Christian Unity and Faith), which is headquartered in India declares the Society's firm belief that, although "the two groups are not in communion with each other", "both the Byzantine (Eastern) Orthodox Churches and the Oriental Orthodox Churches are the true heirs to the One, Holy, Catholic and Apostolic Church of Christ, which was the Church of the apostles and the holy fathers. We also believe these Churches teach the true faith and morals of the Church established by Christ for which the ancient martyrs gave their lives."

== Analogous theories ==
=== Branches of the Evangelical Church theory ===
In Church Dogmatics, Karl Barth, defined the "Evangelical Church" as having three branches: Lutheran, Reformed, and Anglican. The "Evangelical Church" was to be distinguished from what he termed the "three heresies of Neoprotestantism, Roman Catholicism and Eastern Orthodoxy".

=== Sister churches theory ===
What has been called another version of the branch theory was propounded in the wake of the Second Vatican Council by some Roman Catholic theologians, such as Robert F. Taft Michael A. Fahey, and others. In this theory, the Eastern Orthodox Church and the Roman Catholic Church are two "sister churches". This theory was rejected outright by the Catholic Church, which applies the term "sister Churches" only to the relations between particular Churches, such as the sees of Constantinople and Rome. Most Eastern Orthodox theologians also reject it.

A writer in the United States publication Orthodox Life says that ecumenism promotes the idea of a Church comprising all baptized Christians and within which the different confessions are "sister churches".

=== Two lungs theory ===
The metaphor of Christianity compared to one body breathing with two lungs was coined by the Russian poet and philosopher Vyacheslav Ivanov, inspired by the worldview of the 19th century Russian philosopher Vladimir Solovyov. Solovyov "felt that eastern Christians could learn from the Western church's relatively active presence in the world."

Ivanov accepted "the idea of 'Unia'", according to Robert Bird, the "combination of traditional rite and papal authority explains why Ivanov felt he was now breathing with both lungs." Pope John Paul II, according to Bird, "adopted Ivanov's imagery of the two 'lungs' of the universal Church" but John Paul II's "image of the full Church seems to presume their equal coexistence, supposedly without the submission of the East to papal authority."

Pope Benedict XVI and Pope John Paul II used the "two lungs" concept to relate the Latin Church with the Eastern Catholic Churches. John Paul II used the two lungs of a single body metaphor in the context of "the different forms of the Church's great tradition" in Redemptoris Mater (1987). John Paul II used the metaphor to "the Church", which for him was not some amalgam of the Catholic and Eastern Orthodox Church, but the Catholic Church itself, thus indicating that the Catholic Church must avail itself of the traditions of both Eastern Christianity and Western Christianity. The Catholic Church uses this metaphor to compare the Latin Church's tradition to the Eastern Orthodox Churches' traditions and also Eastern Catholic Churches' traditions, as emphasized in the Second Vatican Council's Orientalium ecclesiarum, the decree on Eastern Catholic Churches. John Paul II elaborated the metaphor, in Sacri Canones (1990), "the Church itself, gathered in the one Spirit, breathes as though with two lungs – of the East and of the West – and that it burns with the love of Christ in one heart having two ventricles."

An anonymous author wrote, in Orthodox Life magazine, that the metaphor comparing the Eastern Orthodox Church and the Roman Catholic Church to two lungs of one body was "shaped and influenced by" the branch theory and developed by "Orthodox ecumenists and Papists". Eastern Orthodox reject as incompatible with the Orthodox faith any such use of the "two lungs" expression to imply that the Eastern Orthodox and Roman Catholic churches are two parts of a single church and "that Orthodoxy is only for Easterners, and that Catholicism is only for Westerners", according to Archpriest Andrew Phillips. Patriarch Bartholomew I of Constantinople "rejects the opinion" that "there would be an 'incompatibility between Orthodox tradition and the European cultural way', which would be antinomic" and points out that idea "is against the principle of equality and respect of peoples and cultural traditions on our continent."

Ion Bria wrote in 1991 that the metaphor "may be attractive as an aid for understanding the formation of two distinctive traditions in Christianity after A.D. 1054." In 2005, Bishop Hilarion Alfeyev, chairman of the Representation of the Russian Orthodox Church to the European Institutions, told the 6th Gniezno Convention that the metaphor is "particularly relevant" when he "proposed to form a European Catholic-Orthodox Alliance" and said "nothing should prevent us from uniting our efforts in order to defend Christian tradition, without waiting for the restoration of full unity between the two lungs of European Christianity."
