= Hurrell Froude =

British cleric and writer

Richard Hurrell Froude (/fruːd/; 25 March 1803 – 28 February 1836) was an Anglican priest and an early leader of the Oxford Movement.

== Life ==
He was born in Dartington, Devon, the eldest son of Robert Froude (Archdeacon of Totnes) and the elder brother of historian James Anthony Froude and engineer and naval architect William Froude. He was educated at Ottery St Mary school, and went to Eton College at the age of thirteen. His mother, the first great influence in his life, died when he was eighteen; he matriculated at Oriel College, Oxford, a few weeks later.

At Oxford, his tutor was John Keble, whose holy life and teaching had a profound effect upon him. In 1823, Keble's mother died and he left Oxford to assist his father and two surviving sisters. Froude, Isaac Williams, and Robert Wilberforce went to stay with him at Southrop to read during the Long Vacation. Williams, who did not know Froude well at that time, said of him, "There was an originality of thought and a reality about him which were very refreshing."

Froude took his degree in 1824 with a double second class in Classics and Mathematics, and became a Fellow at Oriel in 1826. The following year he became a Tutor with Wilberforce and Newman as colleagues. Froude was at first shy of Newman, because of Newman's Liberalism. He wrote Wilberforce, "Newman is a fellow that I like more the more I think of him; only I would give a few odd pence if he were not a heretic." Around 1828, Froude brought Keble and Newman together. That same year he received Deacon's orders in the Church of England; and the year after Priest's from the Bishop of Oxford.

Froude, who suffered from tuberculosis, spent the winter of 1832–33 travelling in the Mediterranean with his father and Newman for the sake of his health. On board the mail steamship Hermes they visited Gibraltar, Malta, the Ionian Islands and, subsequently, Sicily, Naples and Rome. In April the Froudes returned home, while Newman returned to Sicily alone, where he fell dangerously ill with gastric or typhoid fever, but recovered.

On his return, Froude contributed to the formation of the Oxford Movement, a group of Christian theologians, including Keble and Newman, who argued for the reinstatement of lost Christian traditions of faith and their inclusion into Anglican liturgy and theology. He was associated with the Tractarians, named after a series of publications, Tracts for the Times, which they published between 1833 and 1841 in the early stages of the movement. Froude contributed four of the Tracts for the Times.

Much of the rest of his life was spent outside England, acting as mathematical tutor at Codrington College in the Barbados, to alleviate his medical condition. He returned to England in 1835. Froude died from the tuberculosis the following year at the age of thirty-two at the Parsonage House in Dartington, where he was born.

After his death, Newman and other friends edited the Remains, a collection of Froude's letters and journals, "an uninhibited assault on Protestantism" that pushed the Oxford Movement closer to Anglo-Catholicism. These were later interpreted by Sir Geoffrey Faber in his work Oxford Apostles, published in 1933 for the centenary of the Oxford Movement.
