= William Palmer (theologian, born 1803) =

The Reverend William Palmer
- Born: William Patrick Palmer; 14 February 1803
- Died: October 1885 (aged 81–82); London, England
- Spouse: Sophia Bonne (m. 1839; died 1872)

Ecclesiastical career
- Religion: Christianity (Anglican)
- Church: Church of England

Academic background
- Education: Trinity College, Dublin; Worcester College, Oxford
- Influences: Charles Lloyd

Academic work
- Discipline: Theology
- School or tradition: High-church Anglicanism
- Institutions: Worcester College, Oxford

William Patrick Palmer (1803–1885), who called himself Sir William Palmer, 9th Baronet, from 1865 (although his claim to the title was never acknowledged), was an Anglican theologian and liturgical scholar of the 19th century.

== Life ==
Born 14 February 1803, Palmer graduated from Worcester College, Oxford. He was an early supporter and influence in the Oxford Movement, but was superseded by John Henry Newman and Edward Pusey. Palmer initially supported the Tracts for the Times, but as opposition to the Oxford Movement grew, he withdrew his support, prompting a cooling in his friendship with Newman and a slow decline in his involvement with the movement. Palmer died in October 1885 in London.

== Works ==
Palmer was author of the Origines Liturgicæ and Treatise on the Church of Christ (1838). The latter formulated the notion, called the "Branch Theory" that, provided that both the apostolic succession, and the Faith of the Apostles are kept intact, then there the Church exists, albeit in one of its branches. This was applied to the Anglican Church.
