= Tract 90 =

1841 theological pamphlet

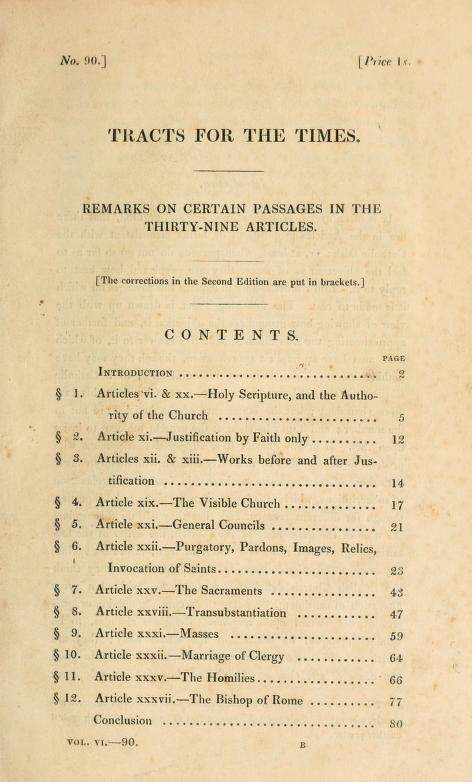
The first page of Tract 90

Remarks on Certain Passages in the Thirty-Nine Articles, better known as Tract 90, was a theological pamphlet written by the English theologian and churchman John Henry Newman and published on 25 January 1841. It is the most famous of the Tracts for the Times produced by the first generation of the Anglo-Catholic Oxford Movement.

== Overview ==
In Tract 90, Newman engaged in a detailed examination of the 39 Articles, suggesting that the negations of the 39 Articles (a key doctrinal standard for the Church of England) were not directed against the authorized creed of Catholics, but only against popular errors and exaggerations. Newman's reasoning had predecessors in the writings of Francis of Saint Clare and William Palmer, although Newman claimed to have been ignorant of Palmer's contemporary treatise In XXXIX Articulos.

The purpose of Tract 90, in common with so many others in the series, was to establish the contention that the fundamental ecclesiological identity of the Church of England was Catholic rather than Protestant. He believed that the 39 Articles were not to be interpreted by the original intent of the particular authors, but if they were to be adopted as a true Anglican formulary, they were to be interpreted in the light of Catholic doctrine. Newman believed that the Articles did espouse true Catholic doctrine, and in explanation of Tract 90, he says: "...the great stumbling-block lay in the 39 Articles. It was urged that here was a positive Note against Anglicanism:--Anglicanism claimed to hold, that the Church of England was nothing else than a continuation in this country, (as the Church of Rome might be in France or Spain) of that one Church of which in old times Athanasius and Augustine were members. But if so, the doctrine must be the same; the doctrine of the Old Church must live and speak in Anglican formularies, in the 39 Articles...it did; that is what I maintained; it did in substance in a true sense. Man had done his worst to disfigure, to mutilate, the old Catholic Truth; but there it was, in spite of them, in the Articles still."

Newman realized that his position in the Church of England rested on church and public approval of an interpretation of the Anglican formularies in a Catholic sense. This was the goal of Tract 90. If it failed, Newman knew that men would leave for Rome. He was proved right, after Tract 90 was denounced. For if the Church of England could not accept its own Catholicity, it had little to offer the Catholic Christians in its fold. He wrote, “I would not hold office in a Church which would not allow my sense of the Articles" and "There were no converts to Rome, till after the condemnation of Tract 90." Newman subsequently converted to the Roman Catholic faith, in which he was later elevated to cardinal dignity.

== Contents ==
Tract 90 is divided into the following sections:

- Introduction.
1. Holy Scripture and the Authority of the Church.
2. Justification by Faith only.
3. Works before and after Justification.
4. The Visible Church.
5. General Councils.
6. Purgatory, Pardons, Images, Relics, Invocation of Saints.
7. The Sacraments.
8. Transubstantiation.
9. Masses.
10. Marriage of Clergy.
11. The Homilies.
12. The Bishop of Rome.
- Conclusion.
