= Oxford Movement =

19th-century English religious movement

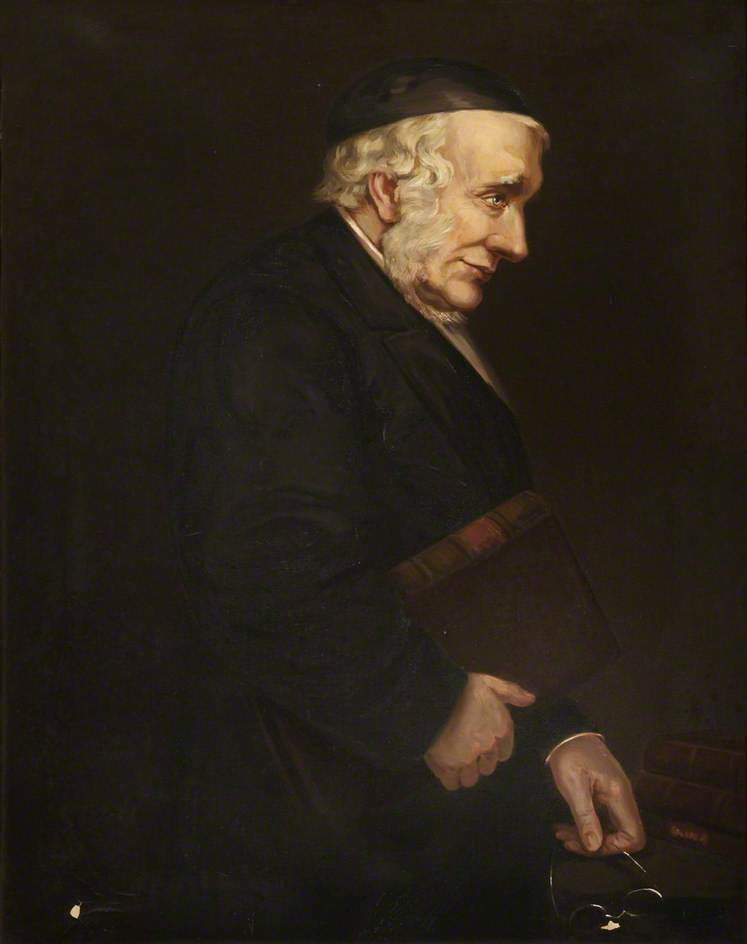
Edward Bouverie Pusey

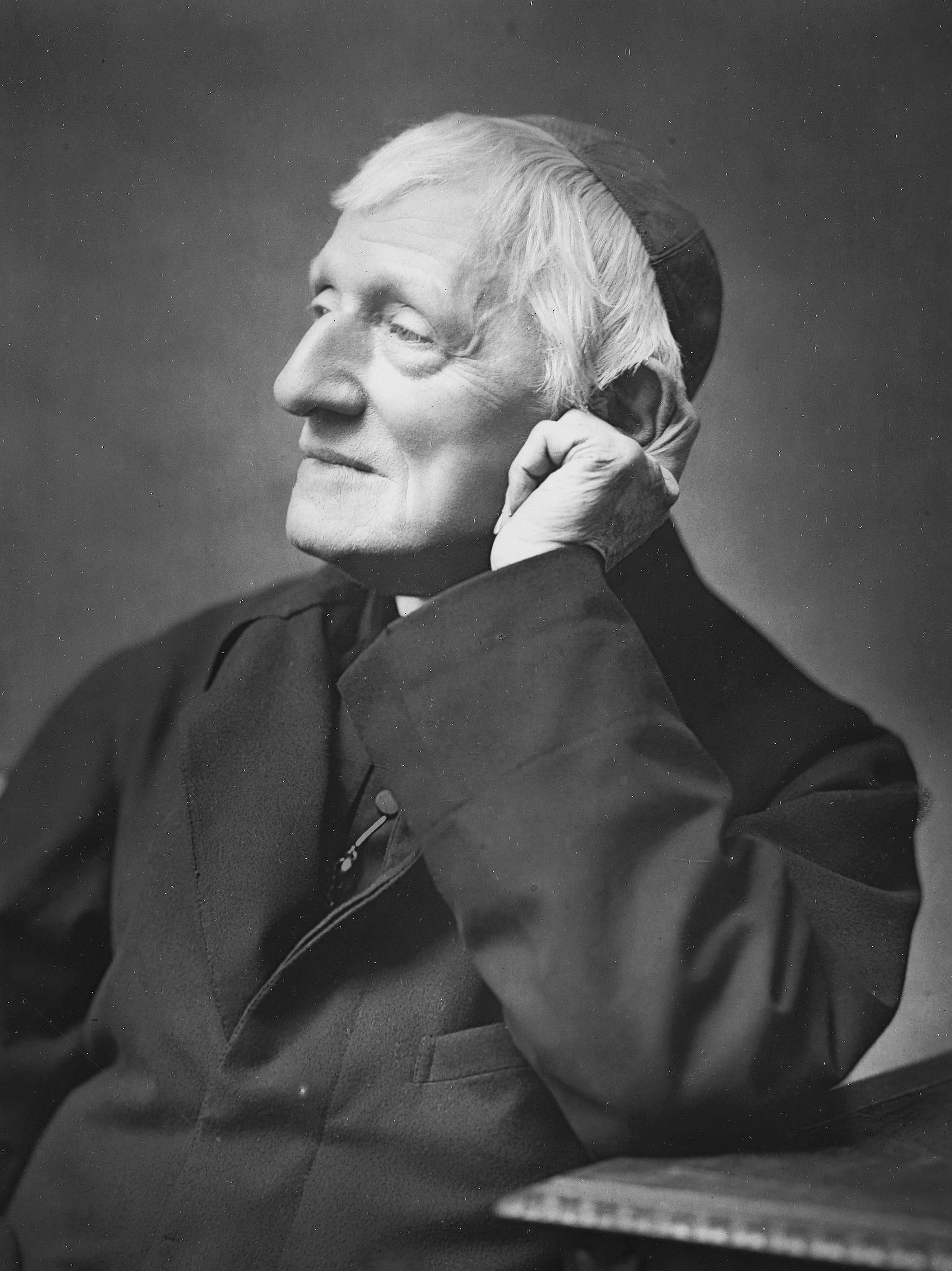
John Henry Newman

The Oxford Movement was a theological movement of high-church members of the Church of England which began in the 1830s and eventually developed into Anglo-Catholicism. The movement, whose original devotees were mostly associated with the University of Oxford, argued for the reinstatement of some older Christian traditions of faith and their inclusion into Anglican liturgy and theology. They thought of Anglicanism as one of three branches of the "one, holy, catholic, and apostolic" Christian Church. Many key participants subsequently converted to Catholicism.

Tractarianism, the movement's philosophy, was named after a series of publications, the Tracts for the Times, written to promote the movement. Tractarians were often disparagingly referred to as "Newmanites" (before 1845) and "Puseyites", after two prominent Tractarians, John Henry Newman and Edward Bouverie Pusey. Other well-known Tractarians included John Keble, Charles Marriott, Richard Froude, Robert Wilberforce, Isaac Williams and William Palmer. All except Williams and Palmer were fellows of Oriel College, Oxford.

== History ==
In the early nineteenth century, many of the clergymen of the Church of England, particularly those in high office, saw themselves as latitudinarian (liberal). Conversely, many clergy in the parishes were Evangelicals, as a result of the revival led by John Wesley. Alongside this, the universities became the breeding ground for a movement to restore liturgical and devotional customs which borrowed deeply from traditions before the English Reformation, as well as from contemporary Catholic traditions.

The immediate impetus for the Tractarian movement was a perceived attack by the reforming Whig administration on established churches of the United Kingdom. The Irish Church Temporalities Bill (1833) provided for the merging of dioceses and provinces of the Church of Ireland and the elimination of vestry assessment (church rates or "parish cess", which allowed vestries, i.e. the local ecclesiastical government of a parish, to tax the entire population), a grievance in the Tithe War. Some politicians and clergy (including a number of Whigs) feared this as a preliminary to similar attacks on the Church of England, leading eventually to disestablishment and loss of its endowments. John Keble criticised these proposals as "National Apostasy" in his Assize Sermon in Oxford in 1833, in which he denied the authority of the British Parliament to abolish dioceses in Ireland.

The Gorham Case, in which secular courts overruled an ecclesiastical court over a priest with unorthodox views on the efficacy of infant baptism, was also deeply unsettling. Keble, Edward Bouverie Pusey, Newman, and others began to publish a series known as Tracts for the Times, which called the Church of England to return to the ways of the ancient and undivided church in matters of doctrine, liturgy and devotion.

The so-called Tractarians believed that the Church of England needed to affirm that its authority did not come from the state, but from God. Even if the Anglican Church were completely separated from the state, it could still claim the loyalty of Englishmen because it rested on divine authority and the principle of apostolic succession. With a wide distribution and a price in pennies, the Tracts succeeded in drawing attention to the views of the Oxford Movement on points of doctrine, but also to its overall approach.

The Tractarians postulated the Branch Theory, which states that Anglicanism, along with Eastern Orthodoxy and Catholicism, form three "branches" of the historic pre-schism Catholic Church. Tractarians argued for the inclusion of traditional aspects of liturgy from medieval religious practice, as they believed the church had become too "plain". In the final tract, "Tract 90", Newman argued that the doctrines of the Catholic Church, as defined by the Council of Trent, were compatible with the Thirty-Nine Articles of the 16th-century Church of England. Newman's eventual reception into the Catholic Church in 1845, followed by Henry Edward Manning in 1851, had a profound effect on the movement, calling into question the via media between Low Church Anglicanism and Catholicism.

== Publications ==
Apart from the Tracts for the Times, the key Tractarians began to translate the works of the Church Fathers, published as Library of the Fathers. The collection eventually comprised 48 volumes, the last published three years after Pusey's death. They were issued through Rivington's company with the imprint of the Holyrood Press, mainly edited by Charles Marriott. A number of volumes of original Greek and Latin texts were also published. Another main contribution was the hymnbook entitled Hymns Ancient and Modern published in 1861.

== Influence ==
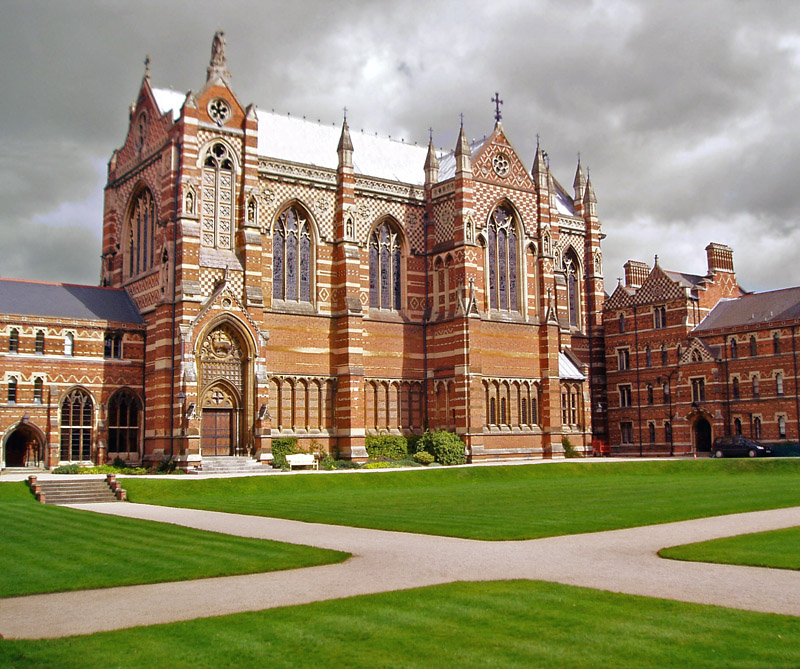
Keble College, Oxford, founded in 1870, was named after John Keble, a Tractarian, by the influence of Edward Pusey, another Tractarian

The Oxford Movement was criticised as being a mere "Romanising" tendency, but it began to influence the theory and practice of Anglicanism more broadly, spreading to cities such as Bristol during the 1840s-50s. The Oxford Movement was also criticised as both secretive and collusive.

The Oxford Movement resulted in the establishment of Anglican religious orders, both of men and of women. It incorporated ideas and practices related to the practice of liturgy and ceremony to incorporate more powerful emotional symbolism in the church. In particular, it brought the insights of the Liturgical Movement into the life of the church. Its effects were so widespread that the Eucharist gradually became more central to worship, vestments became common, and numerous Catholic practices were re-introduced into worship. This led to controversies within churches that resulted in court cases, as in the dispute about ritualism.

Many of the Tractarian priests began working in slums. This was partly because bishops refused to give livings to Tractarian priests, and partly due to an ethos of concern for the poor. From their new ministries, they developed a critique of British social policy, both local and national. One of the results was the establishment of the Christian Social Union, of which a number of bishops were members, where issues such as the just wage, the system of property renting, infant mortality and industrial conditions were debated. The more radical Catholic Crusade was a much smaller organisation than the Oxford Movement. Anglo-Catholicism – as this complex of ideas, styles and organisations became known – had a significant influence on global Anglicanism.

Gu Hongming, an early twentieth-century Chinese author, used the concept of the Oxford Movement to argue for a return to traditional Confucianism in China.

== Newman and Catholic conversion ==
One of the principal writers and proponents of Tractarianism was John Henry Newman, a popular Oxford priest who, after writing his final tract, "Tract 90", became convinced that the Branch Theory was inadequate. Concerns that Tractarianism was disguised Catholicism were not unfounded; Newman believed that the Roman and Anglican churches were wholly compatible. He was received into the Catholic Church in 1845 and was ordained a Catholic priest two years later. He later became a cardinal (but not a bishop). Writing on the end of Tractarianism as a movement, Newman stated:

I saw indeed clearly that my place in the Movement was lost; public confidence was at an end; my occupation was gone. It was simply an impossibility that I could say any thing henceforth to good effect, when I had been posted up by the marshal on the buttery-hatch of every College of my University, after the manner of discommoned pastry-cooks, and when in every part of the country and every class of society, through every organ and opportunity of opinion, in newspapers, in periodicals, at meetings, in pulpits, at dinner-tables, in coffee-rooms, in railway carriages, I was denounced as a traitor who had laid his train and was detected in the very act of firing it against the time-honoured Establishment.

Newman was one of a number of Anglican clergy who were received into the Catholic Church during the 1840s who were either members of, or were influenced by, Tractarianism.

Other people influenced by Tractarianism who became Catholics included:

- Thomas William Allies, ecclesiastical historian and Anglican priest.
- Edward Badeley, ecclesiastical lawyer.
- Robert Hugh Benson, son of the Archbishop of Canterbury, novelist and monsignor.
- Edward Caswall, hymn writer and priest.
- John Chapman, patristic scholar and Catholic priest.
- Augusta Theodosia Drane, writer and Dominican prioress.
- Edgar Edmund Estcourt, canon of St. Chad's Catholic Cathedral, Birmingham.
- Frederick William Faber, theologian, hymn writer, Oratorian and Catholic priest.
- Robert Stephen Hawker, poet and Anglican priest (became a Catholic on his deathbed).
- James Hope-Scott, barrister and Tractarian (received with Manning).
- Gerard Manley Hopkins, poet and Jesuit priest.
- Cecil Chetwynd Kerr, Marchioness of Lothian, church founder and philanthropist.
- Ronald Knox, Biblical text translator and Anglican priest.
- Thomas Cooper Makinson, Anglican priest.
- Henry Edward Manning, later Cardinal Archbishop of Westminster.
- St. George Jackson Mivart, biologist (later interdicted by Cardinal Herbert Vaughan).
- John Brande Morris, Orientalist, eccentric and Catholic priest.
- Frederick Oakeley, author and Catholic priest.
- William Pope, priest who seceded from Anglicanism to the Church of Rome in 1853
- Augustus Pugin, architect.
- Richard Sibthorp, Anglican and Catholic priest (the first to convert, in 1841; later reconverted to Anglicanism)
- William Gowan Todd, Catholic priest
- William George Ward, theologian.
- Lurana White, SA, nun and co-founder with Servant of God Paul Wattson, SA of the Society of the Atonement.

== Others associated with Tractarianism ==
- Edward Burne-Jones
- Richard William Church
- Margaret Anna Cusack
- George Anthony Denison
- Philip Egerton
- Alexander Penrose Forbes
- William Ewart Gladstone
- George Cornelius Gorham
- Renn Dickson Hampden
- Walter Farquhar Hook
- John Walter Lea
- William Lockhart
- John Medley
- James Bowling Mozley
- Thomas Mozley
- John Mason Neale
- Frederick Ouseley
- William Upton Richards
- Christina Rossetti
- Lord Salisbury
- James Henthorn Todd
- Nathaniel Woodard
- Charlotte Mary Yonge

== See also ==
- Anglican Breviary
- Anglican Communion
- Cambridge Camden Society
- Cambridge Movement
- Confraternity of the Blessed Sacrament
- Guild of All Souls
- Library of Anglo-Catholic Theology
- Neo-Lutheranism
- Personal Ordinariate of Our Lady of Walsingham
- Society of the Holy Cross
- Society of King Charles the Martyr
- Society of Mary (Anglican)
- Crypto-papism
