= William Palmer (theologian, born 1811) =

English theologian and antiquarian

William Palmer (1811–1879) was an English theologian and antiquarian, an Anglican deacon and a fellow of Magdalen College, Oxford who examined the practicability of intercommunion between the Anglican and Eastern Orthodox Churches. He later became a Roman Catholic.

== Life ==
The eldest son of William Jocelyn Palmer (rector of Mixbury in Oxfordshire) and Dorothea Richardson (daughter of the Revd William Roundell of Gledstone Hall, Yorkshire), he was born on 12 July 1811. Edwin Palmer and Roundell Palmer, 1st Earl of Selborne, were his brothers. He was educated at Rugby School and Magdalen College, Oxford, where he matriculated on 27 July 1826, and was elected to a demyship. In 1830 he obtained the chancellor's prize with a Latin poem, "Tyrus", and a first-class in the classical schools. In 1831 he graduated BA and in 1832 was ordained as a deacon and received a Magdalen fellowship. In 1833 he proceeded MA and gained the chancellor's prize with a Latin Oratio de Comœdia Atticorum which was printed the same year. During the next three years he was a tutor at the University of Durham, from 1837 to 1839 an examiner in the classical schools at Oxford and from 1838 to 1843 a tutor at Magdalen College.

With extreme high church views, Palmer anticipated in an unpublished Latin introduction to the Thirty-nine Articles, composed for the use of his pupils in 1839–40, the argument of the celebrated Tract XC. He took, however, little active part in the Tractarian movement, studying various forms of ecclesiastical polity and theological belief.

== First visit to Russia ==
In 1840 Palmer visited Russia, seeking obtain recognition of the Anglican claim to intercommunion. Letters of commendation from Martin Joseph Routh, President of Magdalen College, and the British ambassador at the Russian court, gained him an introduction to high functionaries in the Russian church. Palmer worked to persuade them that the Church of England was a branch of the catholic church.

A difficulty was the recent admission to communion by the English chaplain at Geneva of Princess Galitzin and her eldest daughter, both of whom had renounced the Greek church. Prince Galitzin had sought by letter, but had failed to obtain, from Archbishop William Howley an opinion on the question whether apostates from the Russian church could lawfully take the communion in the church of England. At the prince's desire Palmer corresponded with the ladies, the younger of whom he induced to return to the Russian church. His claim for admission to communion in the Russian church, pressed for nearly a year, was at length rejected by Filaret, Metropolitan of Moscow.

On his return to England in the autumn of 1841, Palmer submitted to Bishop Charles James Blomfield, as ordinary of continental chaplains, the question which Archbishop Howley had ducked, and received an affirmative answer.

== Second visit to Russia ==
Bent on renewing his application for admission to communion in the Greek church, Palmer early in 1842 visited Paris, and laid the whole case before Bishop Matthew Luscombe, in whose chapel the Princess Galitzin, then resident in Paris, was in the habit of communicating. He had several interviews with the princess, but failed to alter her views. Bishop Luscombe refused, however, to furnish her with a certificate of communion on the eve of her departure for Russia, and thus Palmer on his return to St. Petersburg was able to exclude her from communion in the English chapel there.

Palmer's second application for admission to communion in the Russian church, supported by letters from Bishop Luscombe and a dissertations of his own on the position of the church of England in Christendom, met an explicit rejection on the part of the Russian church of the Anglican claim to catholicity. The holy governing synod declined to admit him to communion unless he acknowledged the Thirty-nine Articles of religion to be 'in their plain literal sense and spirit' a full and perfect expression of the faith of the churches of England and Scotland, and to contain forty-four heresies; unless he renounced and anathematised the said heresies, the Thirty-nine Articles as containing them and the churches of England and Scotland as implicated in them; and further admitted the Greek church to be the œcumenical church, and were received into the same as a proselyte. The œcumenical character of the Greek church Palmer admitted; he also renounced and anathematised the forty-four heresies, but demurred to their alleged presence in the Thirty-nine Articles. On the question whether what he had done amounted to a renunciation of the churches of England and Scotland, he appealed to Bishop Luscombe and the Scottish Episcopal College.

== Later life ==
Palmer returned to England. Soon after the decision of the privy council in the Gorham case in 1852 Palmer again sought admission to the Greek church, but recoiled before the unconditional rebaptism to which he was required to submit.

On the eve of the Crimean War he studied the question of the Holy Places at Jerusalem. The winter of 1853–4 he passed in Egypt. He went into retreat under Carlo Passaglia at Rome, and there was received into the Roman church, the rite of baptism being dispensed with, in the chapel of the Roman College on 28 February 1855. When William Walsham How, later the Bishop of Wakefield, visited Rome in 1865 he came across Palmer and wrote as follows:

151 Via Bambino, Rome, 24 March. ‘ I am going this evening to a friend to be introduced to Mr. Wm. Palmer, the Vert.' He is a very dangerous man, being very learned and a most unflinching champion of Rome. I want to get him to take us over some of the Catacombs, to which he is about the best guide here. He is not the Wm. Palmer who wrote the Church History, but ' Deacon Palmer,' as he used to be called, because he never would take priest's orders in our Church. He was at one time very nearly joining the Greek Church. I certainly do not feel the least attracted by Rome as a system here, and I imagine it is really made much more attractive to English ideas in England. P.S. (Annunciation.) We went last night to tea, as I said, and met Mr. Palmer. There was no one there but the lady who asked us, and another clergyman and his wife. Mr. Palmer . . . abused the Church of England, and said very hard things. He sadly wanted some one of age, talent and authority enough to put him down. However, on some subjects he was interesting and pleasant enough. The chief thing I fought him on was his attempt to defend the absurd assertion of some Romish manual that the Times is the organ of the Anglican Church. He tried to make out that it fairly represented the dominant spirit of the Church.’

For the rest of his life Palmer resided at Rome in the Piazza di Santa Maria in Campitelli, where he died on 4 April 1879, in his sixty-eighth year. His remains were interred (8 April) in the cemetery of S. Lorenzo in Campo Verano.

== Works ==
During his stay in St. Petersburg Palmer edited R. W. Blackmore's translation of Andrei Nikolaevich Muraviev's History of the Church in Russia, Oxford, 1842. Too late to defend Tract XC, he rebutted a charge of "Romanism" levelled at himself (in his Letter to Charles Pourtales Golightly, and his Letter to a Protestant-Catholic, both published at Oxford in 1841; and his Letter to Renn Dickson Hampden, Oxford, 1842). His Protest against Prusso-Anglican Protestantism, which he lodged with Archbishop Howley in reference to the recently established Anglican-Prussian Bishopric in Jerusalem, was, at the archbishop's request, withheld from publication. He issued, however, its notes and appendices as Aids to Reflection on the seemingly Double Character of the Established Church, Oxford, 1841, and treated the same topic in an anonymous work.

On his second return to England Palmer occupied himself with his Harmony of Anglican Doctrine with the Doctrine of the Eastern Church (Aberdeen, 1846; Greek translation, Athens, 1851) and in the preparation of his case for the Scottish Episcopal College. An Appeal to the Scottish Bishops and Clergy, and generally to the Church of their Communion, Edinburgh, 1849, was dismissed unheard by the Scottish Episcopal Synod assembled in Edinburgh on 7 September 1849. In 1853 appeared his 'Dissertations on Subjects relating to the Orthodox or Eastern-Catholic Communion,' London.

In later life, and in poor health, Palmer made antiquarian researches in ecclesiastical history. He left voluminous manuscripts, mainly autobiographical. John Henry Newman, to whom he used to pay an annual visit at Birmingham, edited after his death his Notes of a Visit to the Russian Church in the Years 1840, 1841, London, 1882.

Palmer was author also of:

- ‘Short Poems and Hymns, the latter mostly Translations,’ Oxford, 1843.
- Ταπεινὴ ἀναφορὰ τοῖς πατριάρχαις, Athens, 1850.
- Διατριβαὶ περὶ τῆς Ἀγγλικῆς Ἐκκλησίas, Athens, 1851.
- Διατριβαὶ περὶ τῆς άνατολικῆς ἐκκλησίas, Athens, 1852.
- ‘Remarks on the Turkish Question,’ London, 1858.
- ‘An Introduction to Early Christian Symbolism; being the Description of a Series of Fourteen Compositions from Fresco-paintings, Glasses, and Sculptured Sarcophagi; with three Appendices,’ London, 1859; new edition, under the title ‘Early Christian Symbolism: a Series of Compositions,’ &c., ed. James Spencer Northcote and W. R. Brownlow, London, 1885.
- 'Egyptian Chronicles: with a Harmony of Sacred and Egyptian Chronology, and an Appendix on Babylonian and Assyrian Antiquities,’ London, 1861, 2 vols.
- ‘Commentatio in Librum Danielis,’ Rome, 1874.
- ‘The Patriarch Nicon and the Tsar,’ from the Russian, London, 6 vols. 1871–6.
