= Ambrose St John =

English Oratorian and linguist (1815–1875)

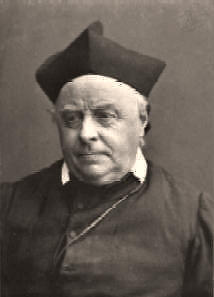
- Reverend Father Ambrose St John
- Born: 29 June 1815; Hornsey, London, United Kingdom
- Died: 24 May 1875 (aged 59); Edgbaston, Birmingham, United Kingdom
- Resting place: Rednal Catholic Cemetery, Rednal, Metropolitan Borough of Birmingham, West Midlands, United Kingdom
- Education: Westminster School, Christ Church, Oxford

Ambrose St John (29 June 1815 – 24 May 1875) was a convert to Catholicism and an English Oratorian. He was a classical scholar and a linguist both in Oriental and European tongues. He is best known as a lifelong friend of Cardinal John Henry Newman.

== Early life ==
St John was born and brought up in Hornsey, Middlesex (present-day Hornsey, North London). He was the son of Henry St John, descended from the Barons St John of Bletso, and the grandson of Andrew St John, Dean of Worcester. He was educated at Westminster School, and Christ Church, Oxford, where he graduated MA, forming a lifelong friendship with Newman.

== Career ==
In 1841 he became curate to Henry Wilberforce, first at Walmer, subsequently at East Farleigh. He then joined Newman at the chapel of Littlemore which he left, on his conversion to the Catholic Church, about a month before Newman's own conversion in October 1845. After a short time spent with Newman at Maryvale he accompanied him to Rome where they were ordained as priests. Having become Oratorians, they began mission work in Birmingham (1847), removing to the suburb of Edgbaston in 1852. There he devoted himself entirely to missionary work, taking a leading part in the work of the Birmingham Oratory and its school. He was a classical scholar and a linguist both in Oriental and European tongues.

St John's death, at Edgbaston, Birmingham, followed his work in translating Josef Fessler's book on papal infallibility, published as The True and False Infallibility of the Popes in London in 1875, a defense of the doctrine of Infallibility as taught by the Italian "Ultramontane" theologians, at a time when the controversy over the doctrine was mounting and Newman was engaged in controversy with William Ewart Gladstone. Newman, who with others had been privately opposed to a dogmatic declaration of the doctrine, which Gladstone had vigorously attacked, reproached himself that he had caused his friend's death by overworking him.

== Relationship with John Henry Newman ==
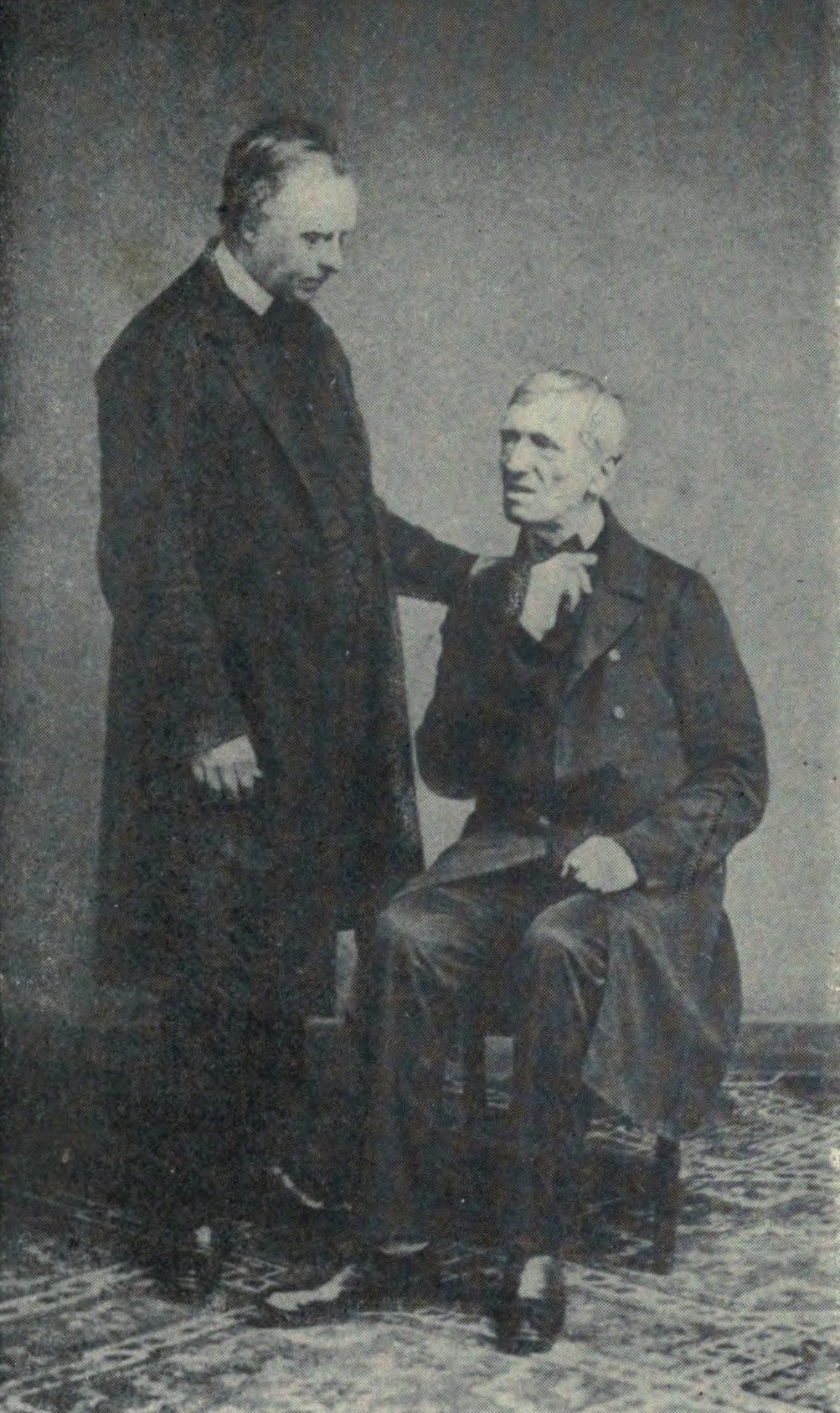
Ambrose St John (left) and John Henry Newman

St John's longest friendship was with John Henry Newman, and the two shared communitarian life for 32 years from 1843 (when St John was 28). Newman wrote after St John's death: "I have ever thought no bereavement was equal to that of a husband's or a wife's, but I feel it difficult to believe that any can be greater, or anyone's sorrow greater, than mine." He was a man of marked individuality and Newman paid tribute to him in his Apologia, and directed that he himself be buried in the same grave as St John: "I wish, with all my heart, to be buried in Fr Ambrose St John's grave — and I give this as my last, my imperative will." The pall over Newman's coffin bore the cardinal's motto, Cor ad cor loquitur (Heart speaks to heart), a phrase he took from Francis de Sales, and quoted some 25 years earlier in a letter on university preaching. He incorporated these words into his famous work on education The Idea of a University.

The two share a memorial stone inscribed with the words he had chosen: Ex umbris et imaginibus in veritatem ("Out of shadows and phantasms into the truth").

In 2008, the Vatican ordered that Fr Ambrose St John's remains be separated from those of Newman, contrary to Newman's dying wishes, in preparation for Newman's possible canonisation. Campaigners for gay rights within the Church speculated the Vatican was embarrassed by the relationship between the two, though historians and scholars of the period suggest this is a misunderstanding of the concept of friendship that existed at the time. Newman's remains in the shared grave were exhumed as part of a plan to move them to the Oratory in Birmingham city centre. At the exhumation, Newman's wooden coffin was found to have disintegrated and the bodies completely decayed.

== Legacy ==
In The Dream of Gerontius, Edward Elgar's 1900 piece based on Newman's 1865 poem, the character of the Guardian Angel is considered to be based on Ambrose St John.

== Sources ==
- Francis Aidan Gasquet, Lord Acton and his Circle (London, 1906)
- Gordon Gorman, Converts to Rome (London, 1910)

== Works ==
- The Raccolta (1857 and several editions thereafter)
