= Charles Pourtales Golightly =

English clergyman and religious writer

Charles Pourtales Golightly (1807–1885) was an Anglican clergyman and religious writer.

== Life ==
Golightly was born on 23 May 1807, the second son of William Golightly of Ham, Surrey, gentleman, by his wife, Frances Dodd. His mother's mother, Aldegunda, was granddaughter of Charles de Pourtalès, 'a distinguished member of an ancient and honourable Huguenot family.' He was educated at Eton College. In his youth he travelled in Europe, visited Rome, seeing there 'a good deal of certain cardinals, and entering into their characters and their politics.' He matriculated 4 March 1824 at Oriel College, Oxford, where he proceeded as B.A. in 1828, M.A. in 1830. His attainments would have justified his election to a fellowship, but as his private property was thought to be a disqualification he took curacies at Penshurst, Kent, and afterwards at Godalming, Surrey.

In 1836, when the chapel of Littlemore, near Oxford, was almost finished, it was suggested that Golightly's means would enable him to take it without an endowment. Golightly entered into the scheme with enthusiasm, and bought one of the curious old houses in Holywell Street, Oxford. A single sermon led, however, to a disagreement with John Henry, later Cardinal Newman, the then vicar of St. Mary's, Oxford, to which Littlemore had been an adjunct, and their official connection, though they had been acquaintances from early youth, at once ceased. In this house he remained for the rest of his life, keenly interested in church matters, and struggling against the spread of what he deemed Romanism.

For some time he was curate of Headington; he held the miserably endowed vicarage of Baldon Toot, and he occasionally officiated in the church of St. Peter in the East, Oxford, for Hamilton, afterwards bishop of Salisbury. He was a thorough student of theology and history. His religious views were those of Hooker, and he gloried in the traditions of the old high church party, but his hatred of Romanism, deepened by his Huguenot descent, made him a fierce opponent of ritualism. Even opponents admitted his deep religious feelings and his frank fearlessness. He was friendly with men of every division of thought, and his charity was unbounded and unostentatious. He was full of anecdote, heightened by much dryness of wit, and was always accessible. For the last three years of his life he was haunted by painful illusions, and his death was a release from pain. He died on Christmas Day 1885, and was buried in Holywell cemetery, near Magdalen College, Oxford. Edward Meyrick Goulburn, dean of Norwich reprinted, 'with additions and a preface, from the "Guardian" of 13 Jan. 1886' his reminiscences of Golightly. An auction catalogue of his furniture and library was issued in February 1886.

== Works ==
All his publications were controversial. They comprise:

- 'Look at Home, or a Short and Easy Method with the Roman Catholics,’ 1837.
- 'Letter to the Bishop of Oxford, containing Strictures upon certain parts of Dr. Pusey's Letter to his Lordship. By a Clergyman of the Diocese,’ &c., 1840.
- 'New and Strange Doctrines extracted from the Writings of Mr. Newman and his Friends, in a Letter to the Rev. W. F. Hook, D.D. By one of the original Subscribers to the "Tracts for the Times",’ 2nd edition, 1841.
- 'Strictures on No. 90 of the "Tracts for the Times", by a Member of the University of Oxford,’ 1841, which reappeared as 'Brief Remarks upon No. 90, second edition, and some subsequent Publications in defence of it, by Rev. C. P. Golightly,’ 1841.
- 'Correspondence illustrative of the actual state of Oxford with reference to Tractarianism,’ 1842.
- 'Facts and Documents showing the alarming state of the Diocese of Oxford, by a Senior Clergyman of the Diocese,’ 1859. This publication had its origin in an article in the Quarterly Review for January 1858, in which the practices at Cuddesdon College were criticised. At a meeting in the Sheldonian Theatre, Oxford, on 22 Nov. 1861, an anonymous handbill, written by Golightly in condemnation of the teaching in the middle class schools connected with St. Nicholas College, Lancing, was distributed. Some reflections were then made upon it by Francis Jeune, the vice-chancellor, and this provoked:
- 'A Letter to the Rev. Dr. Jeune, in vindication of the Handbill by Rev. C. P. Golightly,’ 1861. A second letter to Dr. Jeune, 1861. Still undaunted, he wrote:
- 'The position of Bishop Wilberforce in reference to Ritualism, together with a Prefatory Account of the Romeward Movement in the Church of England in the days of Archbishop Laud. By a Senior Resident Member of the University,’ 1867. He returned to the subject with:
- 'A Solemn Warning against Cuddesdon College,’ 1878, related to 'An Address respecting Cuddesdon College by Rev. E. A. Knox’ (1878), the 'Address of the Old Students of the college to the Bishop of Oxford,’ and the 'Report for the five years ending Trinity Term 1878, by Rev. C. W. Furse, Principal.'

In the same year (1878) Golightly reissued in separate form, and with his name, his 'Brief Account of Romeward Movement in Days of Laud.' The attack on Cuddesdon College was the subject of pp. 358–66, 415–18, vol. ii. of the 'Life of Bishop Wilberforce,’ and Golightly retorted with 'A Letter to the Very Reverend the Dean of Ripon, containing Strictures on the Life of Bishop Wilberforce,’ 1881.

== Notes ==
- This article incorporates text from a publication now in the public domain: "Golightly, Charles Pourtales". Dictionary of National Biography. London: Smith, Elder & Co. 1885–1900.
