= The Dream of Gerontius (poem) =

1865 poem by John Henry Newman

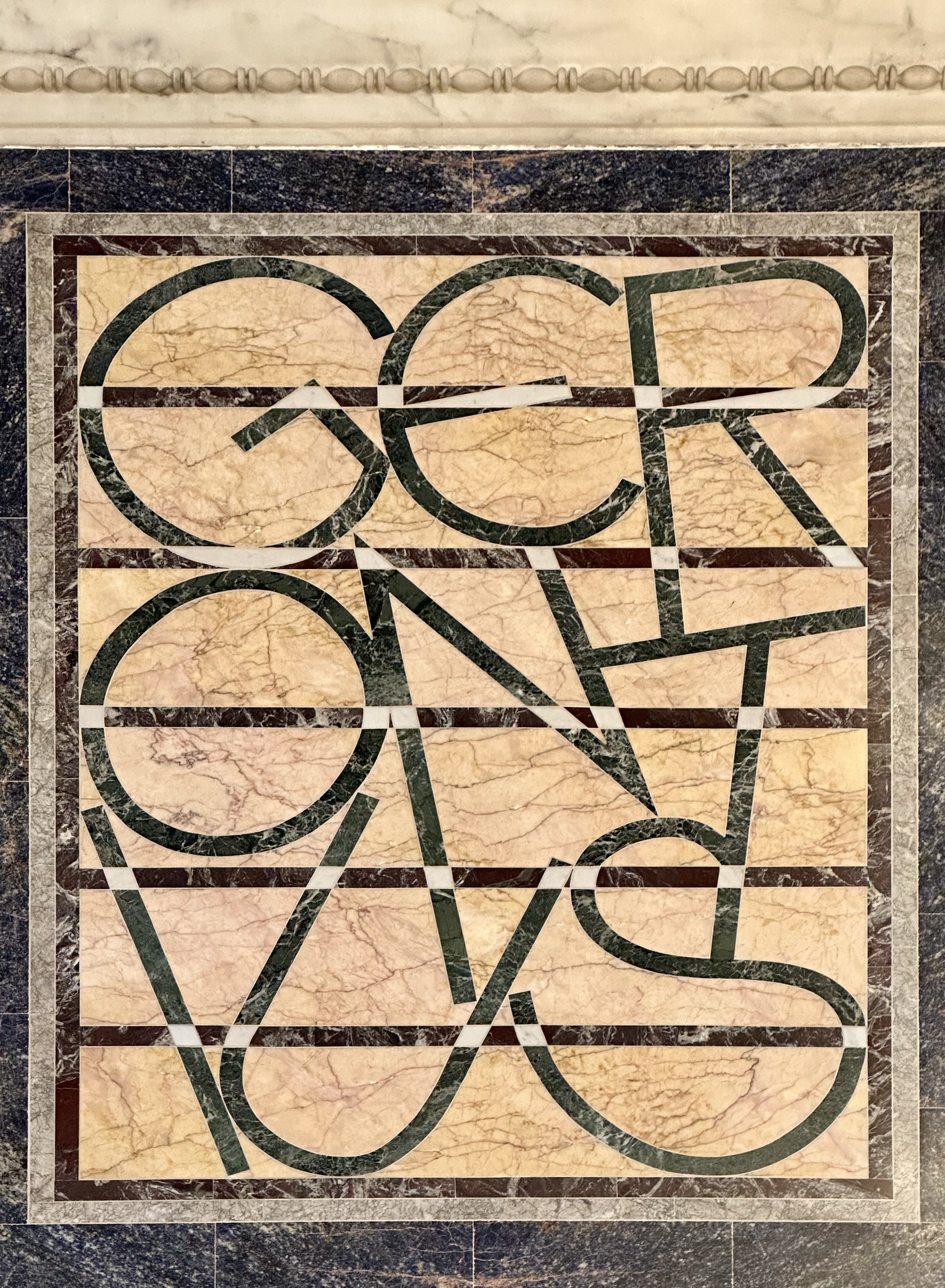
The word "Gerontius" depicted next to the image of John Henry Newman in Westminster Cathedral, London

The Dream of Gerontius is an 1865 poem written by John Henry Newman, consisting of the prayer of a dying man, and angelic and demonic responses. The poem, written some years after Newman's conversion from Anglicanism to Roman Catholicism, explores his new Catholic-held beliefs of the journey from death through Purgatory, thence to Paradise, and to God. The poem follows the main character as he nears death and reawakens as a soul, preparing for judgment, following one of the most important events any human can experience: death.

Newman uses the death and judgement of Gerontius as a prism through which the reader is drawn to contemplation of their own fear of death and sense of unworthiness before God. His depiction of the overwhelmed Gerontius in Phase Seven of the poem, who begs to be taken for purgatorial cleansing rather than diminish the perfection of God and his courts of Saints and Angels by his continued presence, has become a popular expression of humanity's desire for healing through redemptive suffering. This scene of the poem has helped rehabilitate the doctrine of purgatory. It had previously come to be seen as a fearful terror rather than as a state of final purification essentially positive in nature.

Newman said that the poem "was written by accident – and it was published by accident". He wrote it up in fair copy from fifty-two scraps of paper between 17 January and 7 February 1865, and published it in May and June of the same year, in two parts in the Jesuit periodical The Month. The poem inspired a choral work of the same name by Edward Elgar in 1900.

Gerontius owes much of its imagery to the Divine Comedy of Dante Alighieri, an allegorical depiction of traveling through the realms of the dead.

== Structure ==
The poem is divided into seven individual "phases", and is Newman's longest written poem. The first phase details Gerontius's final minutes in this world, while the later phases illustrate his journey through the courts of Heaven.

First Phase

Gerontius is a dying man, who on his death bed in his final moments prays to Jesus and Mary for protection and receives the last sacraments. Gerontius is not confident about where he is going in the afterlife and acknowledges he could be going to hell. Gerontius's friends pray to God, listing all the figures from the Bible who were provided with similar passages into Heaven. At the end of the phase, a priest intones the Proficiscere, (Note: Proficiscere: an ancient prayer beginning Proficiscere, anima Christiana, de hoc mundo ... "Go forth, O Christian soul, from this world ...") bidding Gerontius to go forth to the inexpressible joys that await him.

Second Phase

Gerontius's disembodied soul awakens, "refreshed". Now awake as just a soul he feels free of time and has a new sense of freedom. Gerontius cannot tell if he is alive or dead but assumes he is not dead because he feels nothing out of place. He believes he could get up if only he willed it but finds that "I cannot stir a hand or foot". All of this begins to disorientate him and he begins to feel as if he is floating through space, or possibly that space is floating away from him. His Guardian Angel appears just as Gerontius begins to lose his mind. The angel tells Gerontius that the angel has been watching over him since birth and now the work is done. The angel goes on to explain that throughout Gerontius's life, he has been present to keep a balance of truth and sin, to never let Gerontius fall too far down the wrong way. Gerontius finally accepts after talking to the angel that he is dead.

Third Phase

The Angel states that Gerontius has barely left the physical realm behind, and goes on to explain that time and other such things are merely constructs made by humans, and no longer apply in the afterlife. He also explains that the only thing keeping Gerontius from God is his own thought. Gerontius also asks the Angel why he no longer fears meeting God, and instead, feels a sense of joy in their potential encounter. The Angel tells the soul that its sense of joy is a recompense proceeding from God to keep it in faith and hope while it passes through the coming demonic temptations.

Fourth Phase

The soul of Gerontius and the Angel arrive at "the judgment-court" where demons have assembled. The court is an old region that Satan used to run and used the court to attack people like Job. Satan's legions now run this area in hopes of "gathering souls for hell".

They overhear the demons talking and laughing about Jesus' death. The demons mock those afraid of hell for being cowards because they turn to religion not because of love of the Lord but because of fear of the unknown. The soul of Gerontius asks the Angel why all of his senses still work except sight, "All has been darkness since I left the earth; Shall I remain thus sight-bereft all through my penance-time?" The Angel explains that his soul now exists in a world where he does not need senses but on the day of resurrection he will regain "all thou hast lost, new made and glorified". As for his sight he will remain blind through purgatory because purgatory "Is fire without its light." The soul takes this in stride, "I am not worthy e'er to see again/The face of day". Despite being blind, Gerontius is told that he will see God for a split second during judgment.

Fifth Phase

The Soul and the Angel move onward into the House of Judgment, passing The First Choir of Angelicals whom they overhear singing the praises of God. The Angel explains that buildings in the afterlife are not made of material but made of life, "Holy, blessed and immortal beings/Who hymn their Maker’s praise continually." The Second and Third Choirs of Angelicals are passed. The Third Choir sings about the impending fate of Gerontius, singing about the double agony of the body and soul.

The Angel tells Gerontius of his coming beatific vision. The mere sight of God will fill him with love but also sicken him since, in spite of the wondrous grace the Lord showed in consenting to be crucified, Gerontius was a sinful being. This juxtaposition between the soul's natural yearning to see its loving God face to face and the rightful shame it feels for having sinned against Christ's perfect love is the cause of the soul's coming purgatorial agony.

They arrive at the Sacred Stairs of the Presence-Chamber where Angels line the stairs on either side to help guide the way. As the fifth phase ends, the Fourth and Fifth Choirs of Angelicals arrive to sing to the soul of Gerontius as he prepares to climb the stairs.

Sixth Phase

The soul of Gerontius and his Guardian Angel are by this point very near to the "veiled presence of our God". Far removed from the earlier grandeur of the rhapsodic angelic hosts, Gerontius now finds only a dread and august silence which surrounds the throne of God. The echoes of the prayers for mercy uttered by the Priest and Gerontius's friends at the deathbed in Phase One are discernible in the stillness.

Before the throne stands the Angel of the Agony, the same angel who comforted Jesus in the Garden of Gethsemane, pleading for the salvation of all mankind. The Guardian Angel recommends Gerontius's case to this being's most powerful prayer. Once the Angel of the Agony has begged Jesus to be merciful to Gerontius and to hasten the purgatorial cleansing of all imperfect, saved souls, Gerontius declares himself ready to meet his God.

Guided not by the Guardian Angel's cautious warnings but only by a fervent intemperate love for his Redeemer, Gerontius struggles free from his guardian's embrace and darts longingly to Jesus' feet. Having regained his sight the Soul gazes for a moment into the loving eyes of his Creator. The majesty of the Spirits that surround God however are too much for Gerontius to bear and sick with the love of his Crucified Lord and guilt for his earthly follies he painfully realises that, as yet, he is not ready to receive the beatific vision. He begs his guardian to rescue him from his plight and lead him to a place where, with his whole self still quickened and consumed by God's love, he can by trial and suffering be healed and remade in the image of his God: "Take me away, That sooner I may rise, and go above, And see Him in the truth of everlasting day!"

Seventh Phase

The Angel asks that the “golden prison open its gates” and allow the soul of Gerontius into the realm of Purgatory. The Angel asks for them to take care of him until the day he is allowed to leave into Heaven at which point the Angel will return to “reclaim it for the courts of light.” The souls in Purgatory recite their mantra stating that the Lord will come for them and that they will wake up the next morning to find themselves filled with the Lord’s mercy and be allowed admittance into Heaven. As the poem comes to an end, the Angel softly releases the Soul of Gerontius, into Purgatory. The Angel tells him that the angels of Purgatory will tend to him and nurse him so he becomes ready to enter Heaven. He offers one last goodbye: "Farewell, but not for ever! brother dear, Be brave and patient on thy bed of sorrow; Swiftly shall pass thy night of trial here, And I will come and wake thee on the morrow."

== Critical response ==
The Dream of Gerontius was an immediate success upon its release, owing in part to the Victorian era's rising interest in such subjects as death, suicide, and the after-life. Other authors such as Philip James Bailey, or Johann Wolfgang von Goethe, like Newman, achieved much fame with their writings about the subject of mortality, but, unlike both Goethe and Bailey, Newman took the subject of death and the soul's "life" in the realm eternal, one step further. Because The Dream of Gerontius deals with the journey of the soul from life to death to Heaven, something not many authors and poets had done up to that point, many people wondered what inspirations Newman was drawing from when he wrote it. Some believed that Newman drew inspiration from an 11th-century hymn of Saint Peter Damian, "Rhythmus de die mortis", when constructing his vision, but there are some who feel that Newman’s inspirations and motives were more personal. Due to its title, some believed that Newman drew inspiration for the poem from dreams and not from any religious text. Some also felt that the poem itself might not even deal with death at all, but rather be a vision of an old man—maybe even Newman himself—worrying about life after death. Besides these various groups there were also some who viewed "Newman himself as carrying greater religious authority and credibility than any available creed or communion", and that the "Dream of Gerontius" was a vision of sage wisdom by a Cardinal in the Catholic Church. Whatever Newman's inspiration, "The Dream of Gerontius” remains one of the pivotal works on death and the soul of the Victorian era and one of Newman's most famous works.

== Adaptations ==
- The Dream of Gerontius, a composition by Edward Elgar as a setting of the poem.

== See also ==
- Christian eschatology
