= John Henry Newman =

English philosopher and cardinal (1801–1890)

Saint John Henry Newman, C.O.
- Cardinal Deacon of San Giorgio in Velabro
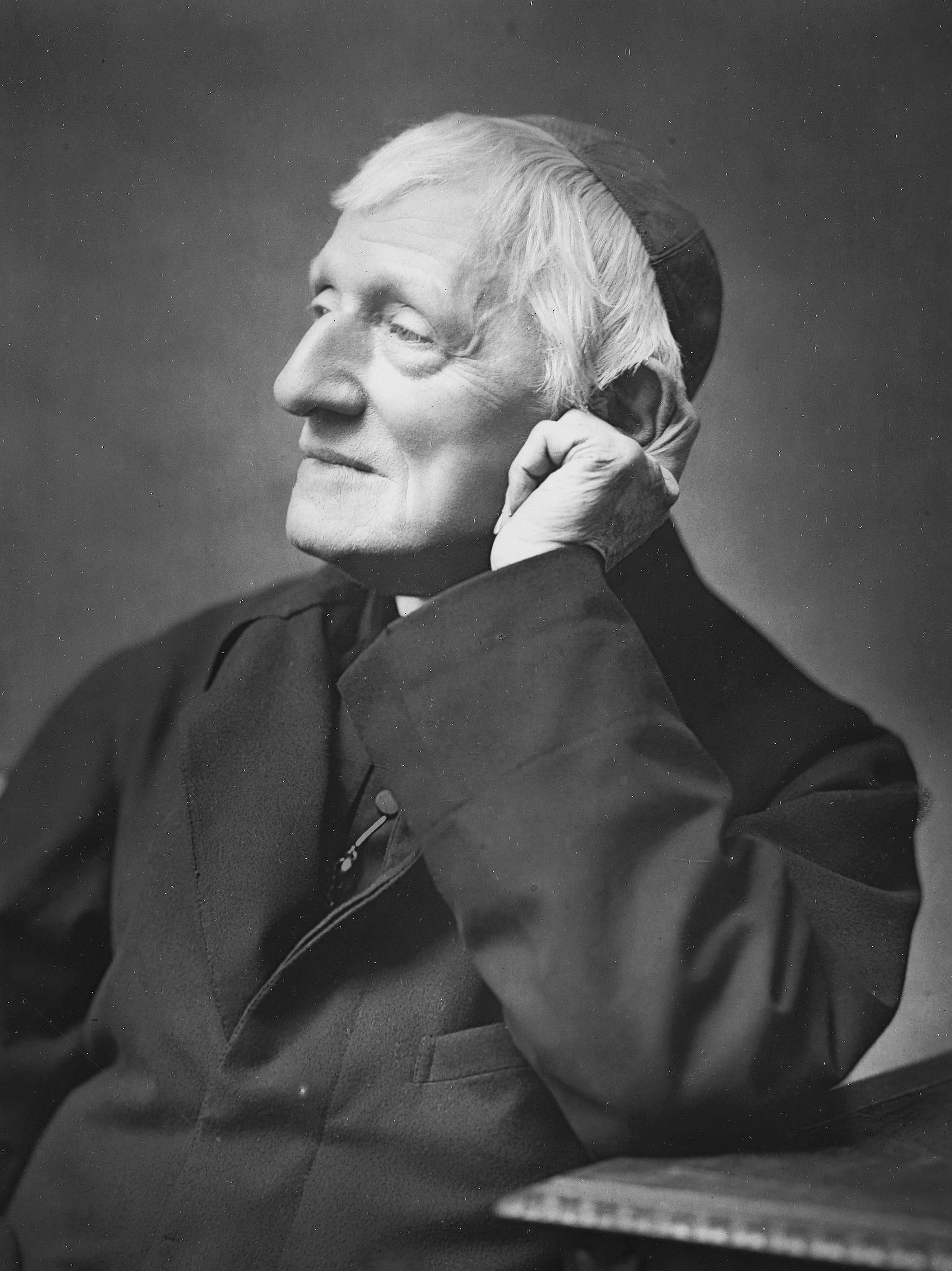
- Newman in 1887
- Church: Catholic Church
- Appointed: 12 May 1879
- Term ended: 11 August 1890
- Predecessor: Tommaso Martinelli
- Successor: Francis Aidan Gasquet, O.S.B.
- Other posts: Fellow of Oriel College, Oxford; Provost of the Birmingham Oratory

Orders
- Ordination: 13 June 1824 (Anglican deacon); 29 May 1825 (Anglican priest); 30 May 1847 (Catholic priest)
- Created cardinal: 12 May 1879 by Pope Leo XIII
- Rank: Cardinal deacon

Personal details
- Born: 21 February 1801 London, England, United Kingdom
- Died: 11 August 1890 (aged 89) Edgbaston, Birmingham, England, United Kingdom
- Buried: Oratory Retreat Cemetery; Rednal, Metropolitan Borough of Birmingham, West Midlands, England
- Denomination: Church of England (1824–1845); Catholic Church (1845–1890)
- Parents: John Newman (died 1824); Jemima Fourdrinier (1772–1836)
- Education: Trinity College, Oxford
- Motto: Cor ad cor loquitur ('Heart speaks unto heart')
- Signature: John Henry Newman, C.O.'s signature

- Coat of arms: John Henry Newman, C.O.'s coat of arms

Sainthood
- Feast day: 9 October (Catholic Church); 11 August (Church of England); 21 February (Episcopal Church)
- Venerated in: Catholic Church; Church of England; Episcopal Church
- Beatified: 19 September 2010; Cofton Park, Birmingham, England, United Kingdom by Pope Benedict XVI
- Canonized: 13 October 2019; Saint Peter's Square, Vatican City by Pope Francis
- Attributes: Cardinal's attire, Oratorian habit
- Patronage: Personal Ordinariate of Our Lady of Walsingham; poets, Pontifical Urban University
- Shrines: Birmingham Oratory, Birmingham, England, United Kingdom

Philosophical work
- Era: 19th-century philosophy
- Region: Western philosophy
- School: Aristotelianism; Augustinianism; Empiricism; Christian humanism
- Main interests: Faith and rationality; Religious epistemology; Historical theology; Christian apologetics; Philosophy of education; Liberal education
- Notable works: Apologia Pro Vita Sua; Tract 90; Grammar of Assent
- Notable ideas: Development of doctrine; Primacy of conscience; Argument for conscience; Illative sense; Apologia

Ordination history
History
Priestly ordination
- Ordained by: Giacomo Filippo Fransoni
- Date: 30 May 1847
- Place: Rome, Papal States
Cardinalate
- Elevated by: Pope Leo XIII
- Date: 12 May 1879

John Henry Newman (21 February 1801 – 11 August 1890) was an English Catholic theologian, academic, philosopher, historian, writer, and poet. He was an important figure in the religious history of England in the 19th century.

Originally an evangelical academic at the University of Oxford and clergyman in the Church of England, Newman was drawn to the high church tradition of Anglicanism. He became one of the more notable leaders of the Oxford Movement, an influential group of Anglicans who wished to restore to the Church of England many Catholic beliefs and liturgical rituals practiced before the English Reformation. In this, the movement had some success. After publishing his Tract 90 in 1841, Newman later wrote: "I was on my death-bed, as regards my membership with the Anglican Church."

In 1845, Newman resigned his teaching post at Oxford, left the Church of England and was received into the Catholic Church. He was quickly ordained as a priest and continued as an influential religious leader, based in Birmingham. In 1879, he was created a cardinal by Pope Leo XIII in recognition of his services to the cause of the Catholic Church in England. He was instrumental in the founding of the Catholic University of Ireland in 1854, which later became University College Dublin.

Newman was also a prominent writer: his major writings include the Tracts for the Times (1833–1841), his Essay on the Development of Christian Doctrine (1845), his autobiography Apologia Pro Vita Sua (1864), and the Grammar of Assent (1870). In particular, his theory on the development of doctrine has been highly influential on subsequent Catholic theology.

Newman's canonization was approved by Pope Francis and took place on 13 October 2019. He was proclaimed a Doctor of the Church by Pope Leo XIV in 2025 and was also named co-patron of Catholic education, joining Saint Thomas Aquinas.

== Early life and education ==
Newman was born on 21 February 1801 in the City of London, the eldest of a family of three sons and three daughters. His father, John Newman, was a banker with Ramsbottom, Newman and Company in Lombard Street. His mother, Jemima (née Fourdrinier), was descended from a notable family of Huguenot refugees in England, founded by the engraver, printer and stationer Paul Fourdrinier. Francis William Newman was a younger brother. His younger sister, Harriet Elizabeth, married Thomas Mozley, also prominent in the Oxford Movement. The family lived in Southampton Street (now Southampton Place) in Bloomsbury and bought a country retreat in Ham, near Richmond, in the early 1800s.

At the age of seven Newman was sent to Great Ealing School conducted by George Nicholas. There George Huxley, father of Thomas Henry Huxley, taught mathematics, and Walter Mayers taught classics. Newman took no part in the casual school games. He was a great reader of the novels of Walter Scott, then in course of publication, and of Robert Southey. Aged 14, he read sceptical works by Thomas Paine, David Hume and perhaps Voltaire.

=== Evangelical ===
At the age of 15, during his last year at school, Newman converted to Evangelical Christianity, an incident of which he wrote in his Apologia that it was "more certain than that I have hands or feet". Almost at the same time (March 1816) the bank Ramsbottom, Newman and Co. crashed, though it paid its creditors, and his father left to manage a brewery. Mayers, who had himself undergone a conversion in 1814, lent Newman books from the English Calvinist tradition. "It was in the autumn of 1816 that Newman fell under the influence of a definite creed and received into his intellect impressions of dogma never afterwards effaced." He became an evangelical Calvinist and, under the influence of the writings of Thomas Newton and of Joseph Milner's History of the Church of Christ, held the typical belief that the Pope was the antichrist. Mayers is described as a moderate, Clapham Sect Calvinist, and Newman read William Law as well as William Beveridge in devotional literature. He also read The Force of Truth by Thomas Scott.

Although to the end of his life, Newman looked back on his conversion to Evangelical Christianity in 1816 as the saving of his soul, he began to shift away from his early Calvinism. As Eamon Duffy puts it, "He came to see Evangelicalism, with its emphasis on religious feeling and on the Reformation doctrine of justification by faith alone, as a Trojan horse for an undogmatic religious individualism that ignored the Church's role in the transmission of revealed truth, and that must lead inexorably to subjectivism and skepticism."

=== At university ===
Newman's name was entered at Lincoln's Inn. He was, however, sent shortly to Trinity College, Oxford, where he studied widely. His anxiety to do well in the final schools produced the opposite result; he broke down in the examination, under Thomas Vowler Short, and so graduated as a BA "under the line" (with lower second class honours in Classics, and having failed classification in the Mathematical Papers). Desiring to remain in Oxford, Newman then took private pupils and read for a fellowship at Oriel College, then "the acknowledged centre of Oxford intellectualism". He was elected a fellow at Oriel on 12 April 1822. Edward Bouverie Pusey was elected a fellow of the same college in 1823.

== Anglican ministry ==
On 13 June 1824, Newman was made an Anglican deacon at Christ Church Cathedral, Oxford. Ten days later he preached his first sermon at Holy Trinity Church in Over Worton (near Banbury, Oxfordshire), where his former teacher, the Reverend Walter Mayers, was curate. On Trinity Sunday, 29 May 1825, he was ordained at Christ Church Cathedral by the Bishop of Oxford, Edward Legge. He became, at Pusey's suggestion, curate of St Clement's Church, Oxford. Here, for two years, he was engaged in parochial work and wrote articles on "Apollonius of Tyana", "Cicero" and "Miracles" for the Encyclopædia Metropolitana.

Richard Whately and Edward Copleston, Provost of Oriel, were leaders in the group of Oriel Noetics, a group of independently thinking dons with a strong belief in free debate. In 1825, at Whately's request, Newman became vice-principal of St Alban Hall, but he held this post for only one year. He attributed much of his "mental improvement" and partial conquest of his shyness at this time to Whately.

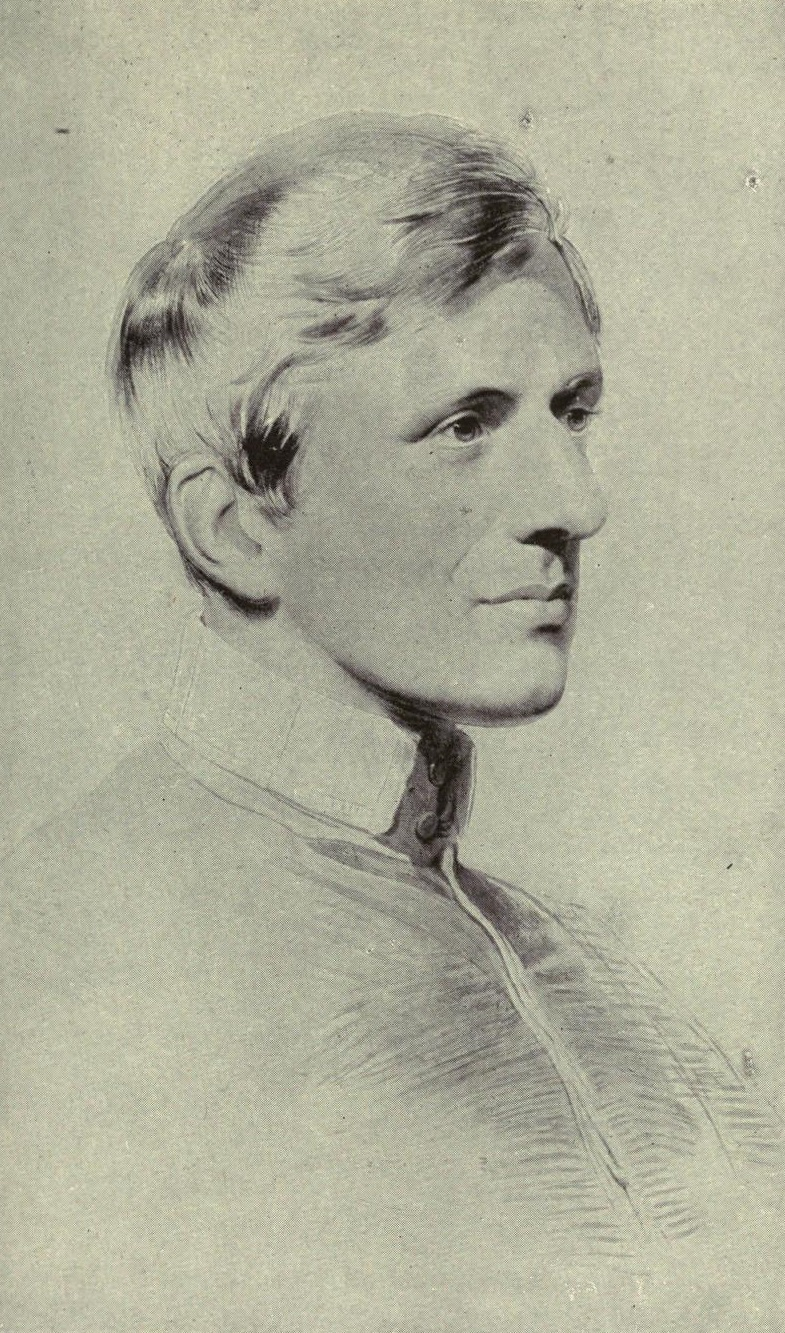
Portrait of Newman by George Richmond, 1844

In 1826, Newman returned as a tutor to Oriel, and the same year Richard Hurrell Froude, described by Newman as "one of the acutest, cleverest and deepest men" he ever met, was elected fellow there. The two formed a high ideal of the tutorial office as clerical and pastoral rather than secular, which led to tensions in the college. Newman assisted Whately in his popular work Elements of Logic (1826, initially for the Encyclopædia Metropolitana), and from him gained a definite idea of the Christian Church as institution: "a Divine appointment, and as a substantive body, independent of the State, and endowed with rights, prerogatives and powers of its own". Newman broke with Whately in 1827 on the occasion of the re-election of Robert Peel as Member of Parliament for the university: Newman opposed Peel on personal grounds. In 1827 Newman was a preacher at Whitehall.

== Oxford Movement ==
In 1828, Newman supported and secured the election of Edward Hawkins as Provost of Oriel over John Keble. In the same year Newman was appointed vicar of St Mary's University Church, to which the benefice of Littlemore (to the south of the city of Oxford) was attached, and Pusey was made Regius Professor of Hebrew. At this date, although Newman was still nominally associated with the Evangelicals, his views were gradually assuming a higher ecclesiastical tone. George Herring considers that the death of his sister Mary in January had a major impact on Newman. In the middle part of the year he worked to read the Church Fathers thoroughly.

While local secretary of the Church Missionary Society, Newman circulated an anonymous letter suggesting a method by which Anglican clergy might practically oust Nonconformists from all control of the society. This resulted in his being dismissed from the post on 8 March 1830; and three months later Newman withdrew from the Bible Society, completing his move away from the low church group. In 1831–1832, Newman became the "Select Preacher" before the university. In 1832 his difference with Hawkins as to the "substantially religious nature" of a college tutorship became acute and prompted his resignation.

=== Mediterranean travels ===
In December 1832, Newman accompanied Archdeacon Robert Froude and his son Hurrell on a tour in southern Europe on account of the latter's health. On board the mail steamship Hermes they visited Gibraltar, Malta, the Ionian Islands and, subsequently, Sicily, Naples and Rome, where Newman made the acquaintance of Nicholas Wiseman. In a letter home he described Rome as "the most wonderful place on Earth", but the Roman Catholic Church as "polytheistic, degrading and idolatrous".

During the course of this tour, Newman wrote most of the short poems which a year later were printed in the Lyra Apostolica. From Rome, instead of accompanying the Froudes home in April, Newman returned to Sicily alone. He fell dangerously ill with gastric or typhoid fever at Leonforte, but recovered, with the conviction that God still had work for him to do in England. Newman saw this as his third providential illness. In June 1833 he left Palermo for Marseille in an orange boat, which was becalmed in the Strait of Bonifacio. Here, Newman wrote the verses "Lead, Kindly Light" which later became popular as a hymn.

=== Tracts for the Times ===
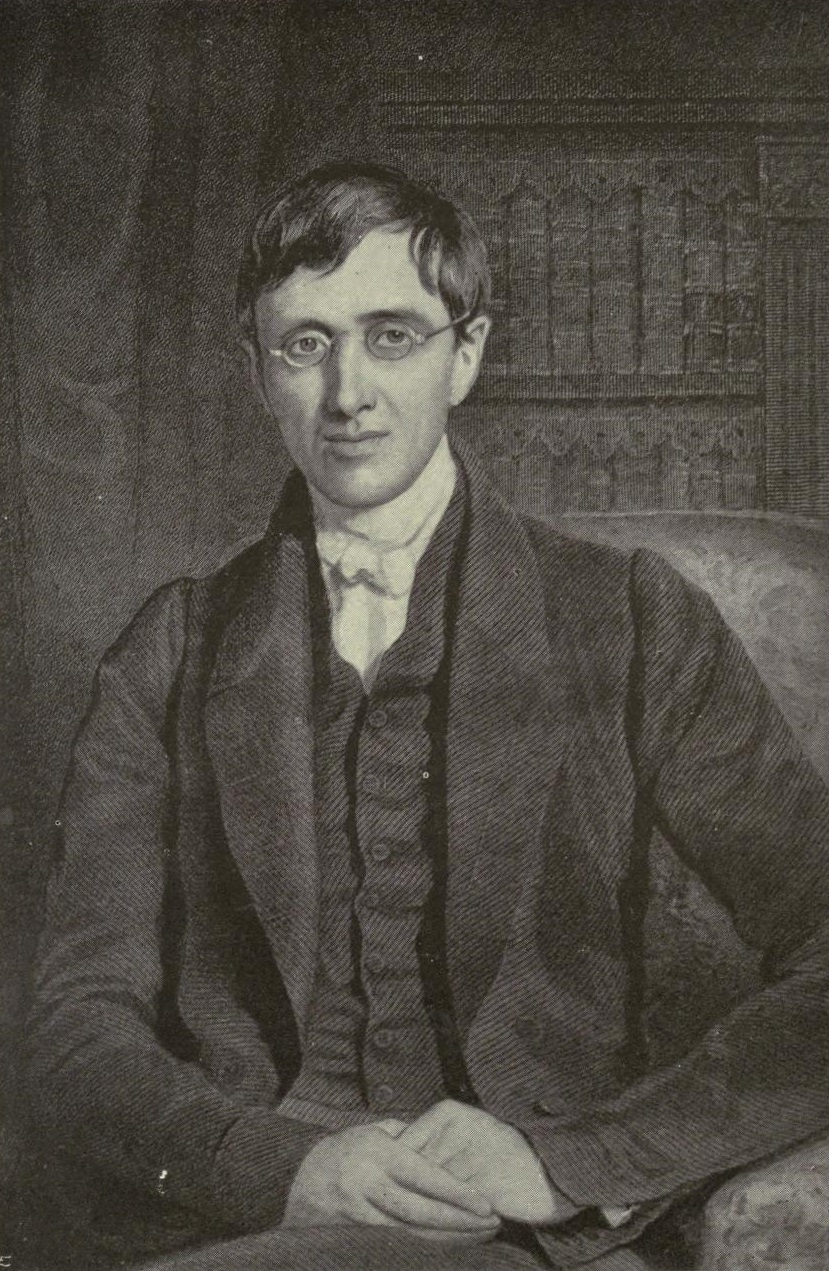
Portrait miniature of Newman by William Charles Ross

Newman was at home again in Oxford on 9 July 1833 and, on 14 July, Keble preached at St Mary's an assize sermon on "National Apostasy", which Newman afterwards regarded as the inauguration of the Oxford Movement. In the words of Richard William Church, it was "Keble who inspired, Froude who gave the impetus, and Newman who took up the work"; but the first organisation of it was due to Hugh James Rose, editor of the British Magazine, who has been styled "the Cambridge originator of the Oxford Movement". Rose met Oxford Movement figures on a visit to Oxford looking for magazine contributors, and it was in his rectory house at Hadleigh, Suffolk, that a meeting of High Church clergy was held over 25–26 July (Newman was not present, but Hurrell Froude, Arthur Philip Perceval, and William Palmer had gone to visit Rose), at which it was resolved to fight for "the apostolical succession and the integrity of the Prayer Book".

A few weeks later Newman started, apparently on his own initiative, the Tracts for the Times, from which the movement was subsequently named "Tractarian". Its aim was to secure for the Church of England a definite basis of doctrine and discipline. At the time the state's financial stance towards the Church of Ireland had raised the spectres of disestablishment, or an exit of high churchmen. The teaching of the tracts was supplemented by Newman's Sunday afternoon sermons at St Mary's, the influence of which, especially over the junior members of the university, was increasingly marked during a period of eight years. Through Francis Rivington, the tracts were published by the Rivington house in London.

In 1835, professor Edward Pusey joined the Oxford Movement and contributed tracts on Baptism and the Eucharist, and the wider movement became known as the so-called "Puseyites", a term soon generally applied to Anglican ritualists. In 1836, the Tractarians appeared as an activist group, in united opposition to the appointment of Renn Dickson Hampden as Regius Professor of Divinity. Hampden's 1832 Bampton Lectures, in the preparation of which Joseph Blanco White assisted, were suspected of heresy; and this suspicion was accentuated by a pamphlet put forth by Newman, Elucidations of Dr Hampden's Theological Statements. At this date, Newman became editor of the British Critic. He also gave courses of lectures in a side chapel of St Mary's in defence of the via media ("middle way") of Anglicanism between Roman Catholicism and popular Protestantism.

=== Doubts and opposition ===
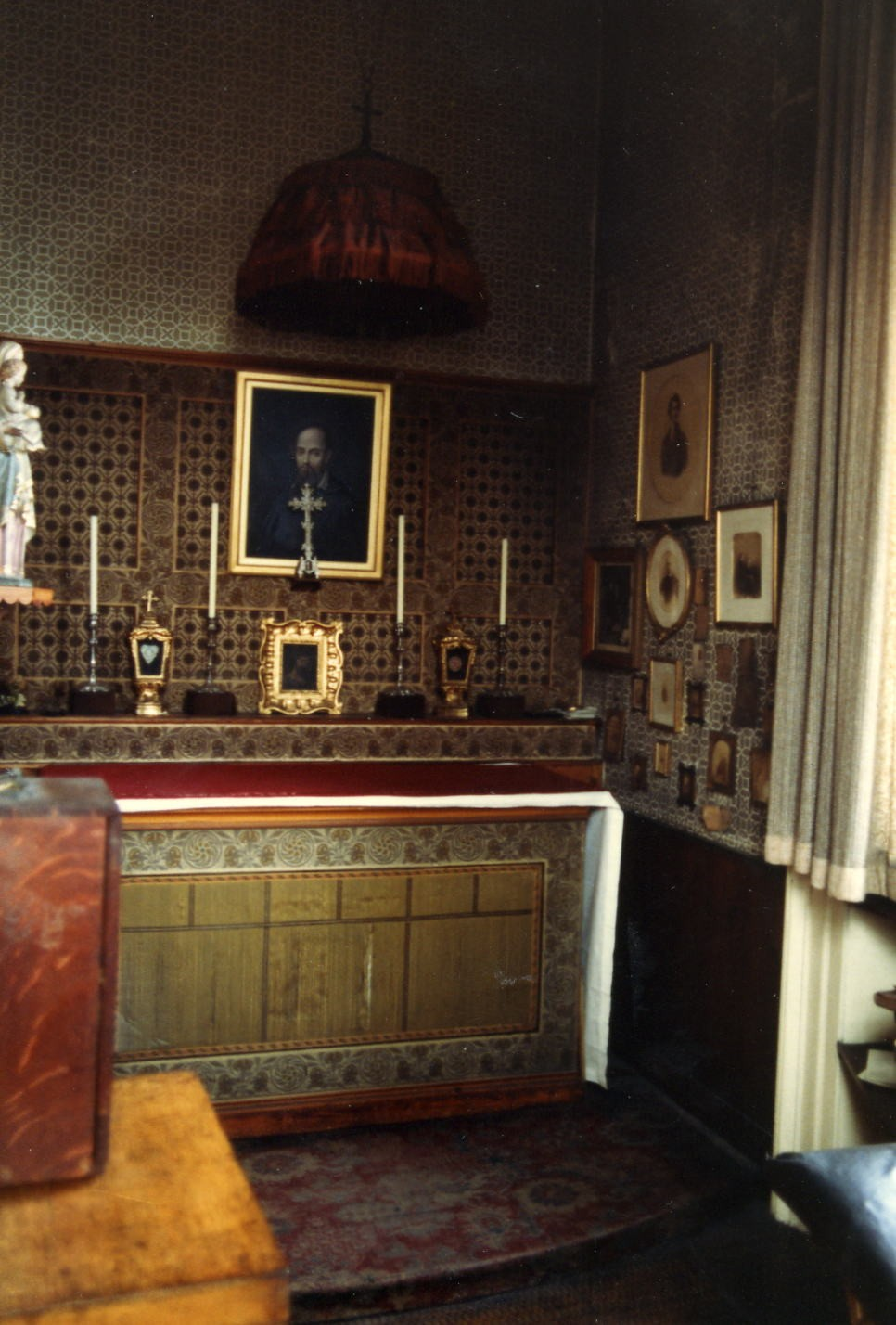
Newman's private chapel in his room

Newman's influence in Oxford was supreme about the year 1839. Just then, however, his study of monophysitism caused him to doubt whether Anglican theology was consistent with the principles of ecclesiastical authority which he had come to accept. He read Nicholas Wiseman's article in the Dublin Review on "The Anglican Claim", which quoted Augustine of Hippo against the Donatists, "securus judicat orbis terrarum" ("the verdict of the world is conclusive"). Newman later wrote of his reaction:

For a mere sentence, the words of St Augustine struck me with a power which I never had felt from any words before. ... They were like the 'Tolle, lege,—Tolle, lege,' of the child, which converted St Augustine himself. 'Securus judicat orbis terrarum!' By those great words of the ancient Father, interpreting and summing up the long and varied course of ecclesiastical history, the theology of the Via Media was absolutely pulverised. (Apologia, part 5)

After a furore in which the eccentric John Brande Morris preached for him in St Mary's in September 1839, Newman began to think of moving away from Oxford. One plan that surfaced was to set up a religious community in Littlemore, outside the city of Oxford. Since accepting his post at St Mary's, Newman had a chapel (dedicated to Sts Nicholas and Mary) and a school built in the parish's neglected area. Newman's mother had laid the foundation stone in 1835, based on a half-acre plot and £100 given by Oriel College. Newman planned to appoint Charles Pourtales Golightly, an Oriel man, as curate at Littlemore in 1836. However, Golightly had taken offence at one of Newman's sermons and joined a group of aggressive anti-Catholics. Isaac Williams became Littlemore's curate instead, succeeded by John Rouse Bloxam from 1837 to 1840, during which the school opened. William John Copeland acted as curate from 1840.

Newman continued as a High Anglican controversialist until 1841, when he published Tract 90, which proved the last of the series. This detailed examination of the Thirty-Nine Articles suggested that their framers directed their negations not against Catholicism's authorised creed, but only against popular errors and exaggerations. Though this was not altogether new, Archibald Campbell Tait, with three other senior tutors, denounced it as "suggesting and opening a way by which men might violate their solemn engagements to the university". Other heads of houses and others in authority joined in the alarm. At the request of Richard Bagot, the Bishop of Oxford, the publication of the Tracts came to an end.

=== Retreat to Littlemore ===
Newman also resigned the editorship of the British Critic and was thenceforth, as he later described it, "on his deathbed as regards membership with the Anglican Church". He now considered the position of Anglicans to be similar to that of the semi-Arians in the Arian controversy. The joint Anglican-Lutheran bishopric set up in Jerusalem was to him further evidence that the Church of England was not apostolic.

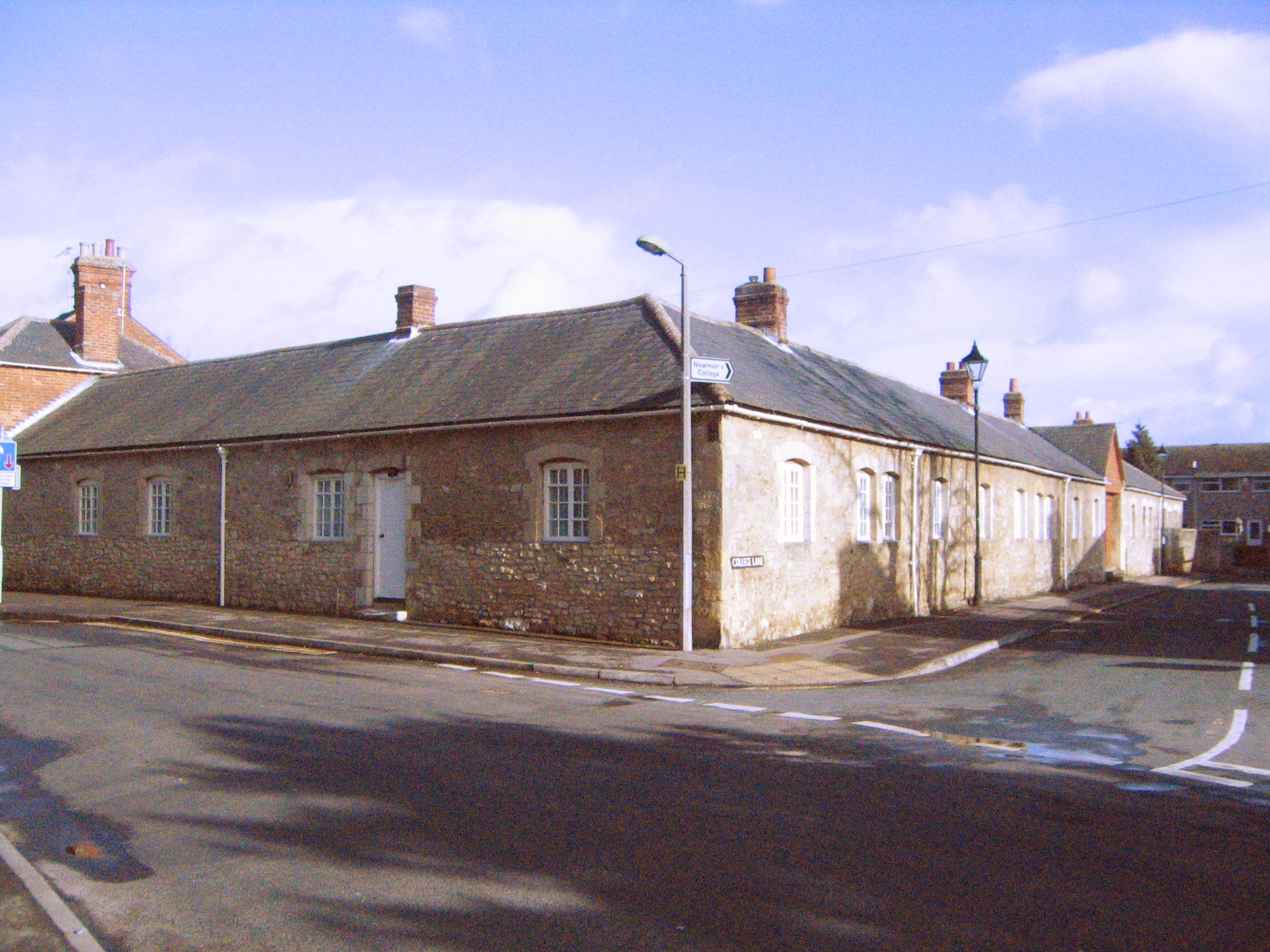
Newman College, College Lane, Littlemore

In 1842, Newman withdrew to Littlemore with a small band of followers, and lived in semi-monastic conditions. The first to join him there was John Dobree Dalgairns. Others were William Lockhart on the advice of Henry Manning, Ambrose St John in 1843, Frederick Oakeley and Albany James Christie in 1845. The group adapted buildings in what is now College Lane, Littlemore, opposite the inn, including stables and a granary for stage coaches. Newman called it "the house of the Blessed Virgin Mary at Littlemore" (now Newman College). This "Anglican monastery" attracted publicity, and much curiosity in Oxford, which Newman tried to downplay, but some nicknamed it Newmanooth (from Maynooth College). Some Newman disciples wrote about English saints, while Newman himself worked to complete an Essay on the development of doctrine.

In February 1843, Newman published, as an advertisement in the Oxford Conservative Journal, an anonymous but otherwise formal retractation of all the hard things he had said against Roman Catholicism. Lockhart became the first in the group to convert formally to Catholicism. Newman preached his last Anglican sermon at Littlemore, the valedictory "The parting of friends" on 25 September, and resigned the living of St Mary's, although he did not leave Littlemore for two more years, until his own formal reception into the Catholic Church.

== Conversion to Catholicism ==
An interval of two years then elapsed before Newman was received into the Catholic Church on 9 October 1845 by Dominic Barberi, an Italian Passionist, at the college in Littlemore. The personal consequences for Newman of his conversion were great: he suffered broken relationships with family and friends, and attitudes toward him within his Oxford circle became polarised. The effect on the wider Tractarian movement is still debated since Newman's leading role is regarded by some scholars as overstated, as is Oxford's domination of the movement as a whole. Tractarian writings had a wide and continuing circulation after 1845, well beyond the range of personal contacts with the main Oxford figures, and Tractarian clergy continued to be recruited into the Church of England in numbers.

=== Oratorian ===
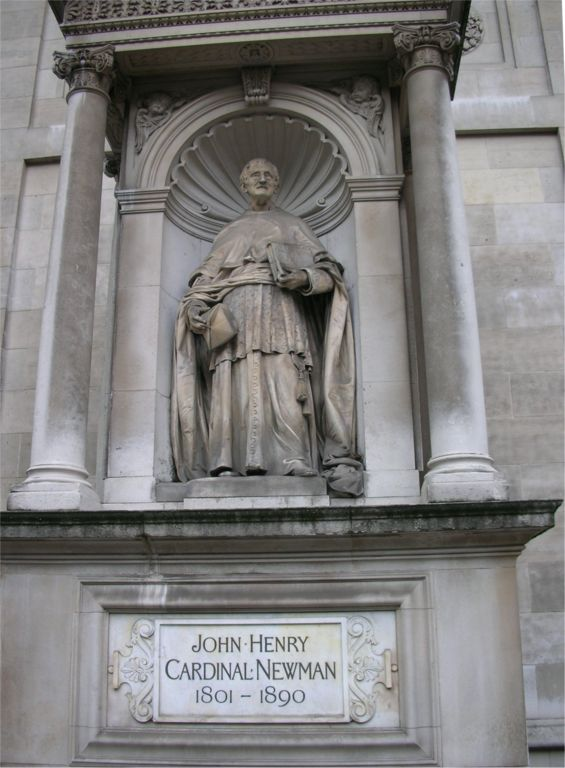
Statue outside the Church of the Immaculate Heart of Mary, popularly known as Brompton Oratory, in London

In February 1846, Newman left Oxford for St. Mary's College, Oscott, where Nicholas Wiseman, then vicar-apostolic of the Midland district, resided; and in October he went to Rome, where he was ordained priest by Cardinal Giacomo Filippo Fransoni and awarded the degree of Doctor of Divinity by Pope Pius IX. At the close of 1847, Newman returned to England as an Oratorian and resided first at Maryvale (near Old Oscott, now the site of Maryvale Institute, a college of Theology, Philosophy and Religious Education); then at St Wilfrid's College, Cheadle; and then at St Anne's, Alcester Street, Birmingham. Finally, he settled at Edgbaston, where spacious premises were built for the community, and where (except for four years in Ireland) he lived a secluded life for nearly forty years. Before the house at Edgbaston was occupied, Newman established the London Oratory, with Father Frederick William Faber as its superior.

=== Lectures on the Present Position of Catholics in England ===
Anti-Catholicism had been central to British culture since the 16th-century English Reformation. According to D. G. Paz, anti-Catholicism was "an integral part of what it meant to be a Victorian". Popular anti-Catholic feeling ran high at this time, partly in consequence of the papal bull Universalis Ecclesiae by which Pope Pius IX re-established the Catholic diocesan hierarchy in England on 29 September 1850. New episcopal sees were created and Cardinal Nicholas Wiseman was to be the first Archbishop of Westminster. Wiseman announced the restoration of the hierarchy in England on 7 October in a pastoral letter dated "from out of the Flaminian Gate".

Led by The Times and Punch, the British press saw this as being an attempt by the papacy to reclaim jurisdiction over England. This was dubbed the "Papal Aggression". The prime minister, John Russell, wrote a public letter to the Bishop of Durham and denounced this "attempt to impose a foreign yoke upon our minds and consciences". Russell's stirring up of anti-Catholicism led to a national outcry. This "No Popery" uproar led to violence with Catholic priests being pelted in the streets and Catholic churches being attacked.

Newman was keen for lay people to be at the forefront of any public apologetics, writing that Catholics should "make the excuse of this persecution for getting up a great organization, going round the towns giving lectures, or making speeches". He supported John Capes in the committee he was organising for public lectures in February 1851. Due to ill health, Capes had to stop them halfway through. Newman took the initiative and booked the Birmingham Corn Exchange for a series of public lectures. He decided to make their tone popular and provide cheap off-prints to those who attended. These lectures were his Lectures on the Present Position of Catholics in England and they were delivered weekly, beginning on 30 June and published on 1 September 1851. In total, there were nine lectures:

1. Protestant view of the Catholic Church
2. Tradition the sustaining power of the Protestant view
3. Fable the basis of the Protestant view
4. True testimony insufficient for the Protestant view
5. Logical inconsistency of the Protestant view
6. Prejudice the life of the Protestant view
7. Assumed principles of the intellectual ground of the Protestant view
8. Ignorance concerning Catholics the protection of the Protestant view
9. Duties of Catholics towards the Protestant view

which form the nine chapters of the published book. Following the first edition, a number of paragraphs were removed following the Achilli trial as "they were decided by a jury to constitute a libel, June 24, 1852." Andrew Nash describes the Lectures as "an analysis of this [anti-Catholic] ideology, satirising it, demonstrating the false traditions on which it was based and advising Catholics how they should respond to it. They were the first of their kind in English literature." John Wolffe assesses the Lectures as:

an interesting treatment of the problem of anti-Catholicism from an observer whose partisan commitment did not cause him to slide into mere polemic and who had the advantage of viewing the religious battlefield from both sides of the tortured no man's land of Littlemore.

The response to the Lectures was split between Catholics and Protestants. Generally, Catholics greeted them with enthusiasm. A review in The Rambler, a Catholic periodical, saw them as "furnishing a key to the whole mystery of anti-Catholic hostility and as shewing the special point of attack upon which our controversial energies should be concentrated." However, some Catholic theologians, principally John Gillow, president of Ushaw College, perceived Newman's language as ascribing too much to the role of the laity. Gillow accused Newman of giving the impression that the church's infallibility resides in a partnership between the hierarchy and the faithful, rather than falling exclusively in the teaching office of the church, a concept described by Pope Pius IX as the "ordinary magisterium" of the church. The Protestant response was less positive. Archdeacon Julius Hare said that Newman "is determined to say whatever he chooses, in spite of facts and reason".

Wilfrid Ward, Newman's first biographer, describes the Lectures as follows:

We have the very curious spectacle of a grave religious apologist giving rein for the first time at the age of fifty to a sense of rollicking fun and gifts of humorous writing, which if expended on other subjects would naturally have adorned the pages of Thackeray's Punch.

Ian Ker has raised the profile of Newman's satire. Ker notes that Newman's imagery has a "savage, Swiftian flavour" and can be "grotesque in the Dickens manner". Newman himself described the Lectures as his "best-written book".

=== Achilli trial ===
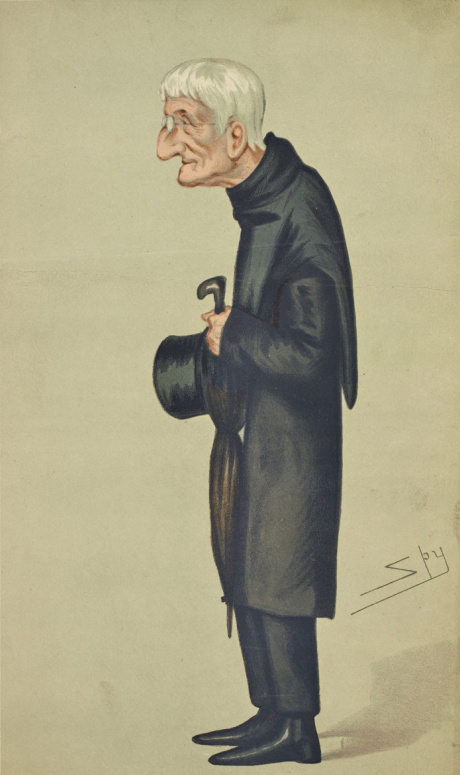
Caricature of Newman by "Spy", published in Vanity Fair in 1877

One of the features of English anti-Catholicism was the holding of public meetings at which ex-Catholics, including former priests, denounced their prior beliefs and gave detailed accounts of the alleged "horrors" of Catholic life. Giacinto Achilli (1803–1860), an ex-Dominican friar, was one such speaker.

In 1841, the Roman Inquisition had suspended Achilli's priestly faculties for sexual misconduct and sentenced Achilli to three years of penance in a Dominican house. Achilli left the house in 1842, becoming Protestant and asking for political asylum in Corfu. In 1850, he was brought to England by the Evangelical Alliance, which portrayed him as a victim, to speak against the Catholic Church. In July 1850, Wiseman wrote a detailed exposé of him in The Dublin Review which listed all of his offences. Newman therefore assumed, after seeking legal advice, that he would be able to repeat the facts in his fifth lecture in his Lectures on the Present Position of Catholics in England.

The section of the lecture that was decided by jury to constitute a libel was:

I have been a Catholic and an infidel; I have been a Roman priest and a hypocrite; I have been a profligate under a cowl. I am that Father Achilli, who as early as 1826, was deprived of my faculty to lecture, for an offence which my superiors did their best to conceal; and who in 1827 had already earned the reputation of a scandalous friar. I am that Achilli, who in the diocese of Viterbo in February 1831, robbed of her honour a young woman of eighteen; who in September 1833, was found guilty of a second such crime, in the case of a person of twenty-eight; and who perpetrated a third in July 1834, in the case of another aged twenty-four. I am he, who afterwards was found guilty of sins, similar or worse, in other towns of the neighbourhood. I am that son of St. Dominic who is known to have repeated the offence at Capua, in 1834 or 1835; and at Naples again, in 1840, in the case of a child of fi[f]teen. I am he who chose the sacristy of the church for one of these crimes, and Good Friday for another. Look on me, ye mothers of England, a confessor against Popery, for ye 'ne'er may look upon my like again.' I am that veritable priest, who, after all this, began to speak against, not only the Catholic faith, but the moral law, and perverted others by my teaching. I am the Cavaliere Achilli, who then went to Corfu, made the wife of a tailor faithless to her husband, and lived publicly and travelled about with the wife of a chorus-singer. I am that Professor of the Protestant College at Malta, who with two others was dismissed from my post for offences which the authorities cannot get themselves to describe. And now attend to me, such as I am, and you shall see what you shall see about the barbarity and profligacy of the Inquisitors of Rome.

You speak truly, O Achilli, and we cannot answer you a word. You are a Priest; you have been a Friar; you are, it is undeniable, the scandal of Catholicism, and the palmary argument of Protestants, by your extraordinary depravity. You have been, it is true, a profligate, an unbeliever, and a hypocrite. Not many years passed of your conventual life, and you were never in the choir, always in private houses, so that the laity observed you. You were deprived of your professorship, we own it; you were prohibited from preaching and hearing confessions; you were obliged to give hush-money to the father of one of your victims, as we learned from an official document of the Neapolitan Police to be 'known for habitual incontinency;' your name came before the civil tribunal at Corfu for your crime of adultery. You have put the crown on your offences, by as long as you could, denying them all; you have professed to seek after truth, when you were ravening after sin.

The libel charge was officially laid against Newman in November. Under English law, Newman needed to prove every single charge he had made against Achilli. Newman requested the documents that Wiseman had used for his article in the Dublin Review but he had mislaid them. He eventually found them but it was too late to prevent the trial. Newman and his defence committee needed to locate the victims and return them to England. A number of the victims were found and Maria Giberne, a friend of Newman, went to Italy to return with them to England. Achilli, on hearing that witnesses were being brought, arranged for the trial to be delayed. This put Newman under great strain as he had been invited to be the founding rector of the proposed Catholic University in Dublin and was composing and delivering the lectures that would become The Idea of a University.

On 21 June 1852, the libel trial started and lasted three days. Despite the evidence of the victims and witnesses, Achilli denied that any of it had happened; the jury believed him and found Newman guilty of libel. The Times said in response that "a great blow has been given to the administration of justice in this country". A second trial was not granted and sentencing was postponed. When sentencing occurred, Newman did not get the prison sentence expected but got a fine of £100 and a long lecture from Judge John Taylor Coleridge about his moral deterioration since he had become a Catholic. Coleridge later wrote to Keble: "It is a very painful matter for us who must hail this libel as false, believing it is in great part true—or at least that it may be."

The fine was paid on the spot and while his expenses as defendant amounted to about £14,000, they were paid out of a fund organised by this defence committee to which Catholics at home and abroad had contributed; there was £2,000 left over which was spent on the purchase of a small property in Rednal, on the Lickey Hills, with a chapel and cemetery, where Newman was eventually buried. Newman removed the libellous section of the fifth lecture and replaced it with the inscription:

De illis quae sequebantur / posterorum judicium sit – About those things which had followed / let posterity be the judge.

=== Educator ===
In 1854, at the request of the Irish Catholic bishops, Newman went to Dublin as rector of the newly established Catholic University of Ireland, now University College Dublin. It was during this time that he founded the Literary and Historical Society. After four years, he retired. He published a volume of lectures entitled The Idea of a University, which explained his philosophy of education.

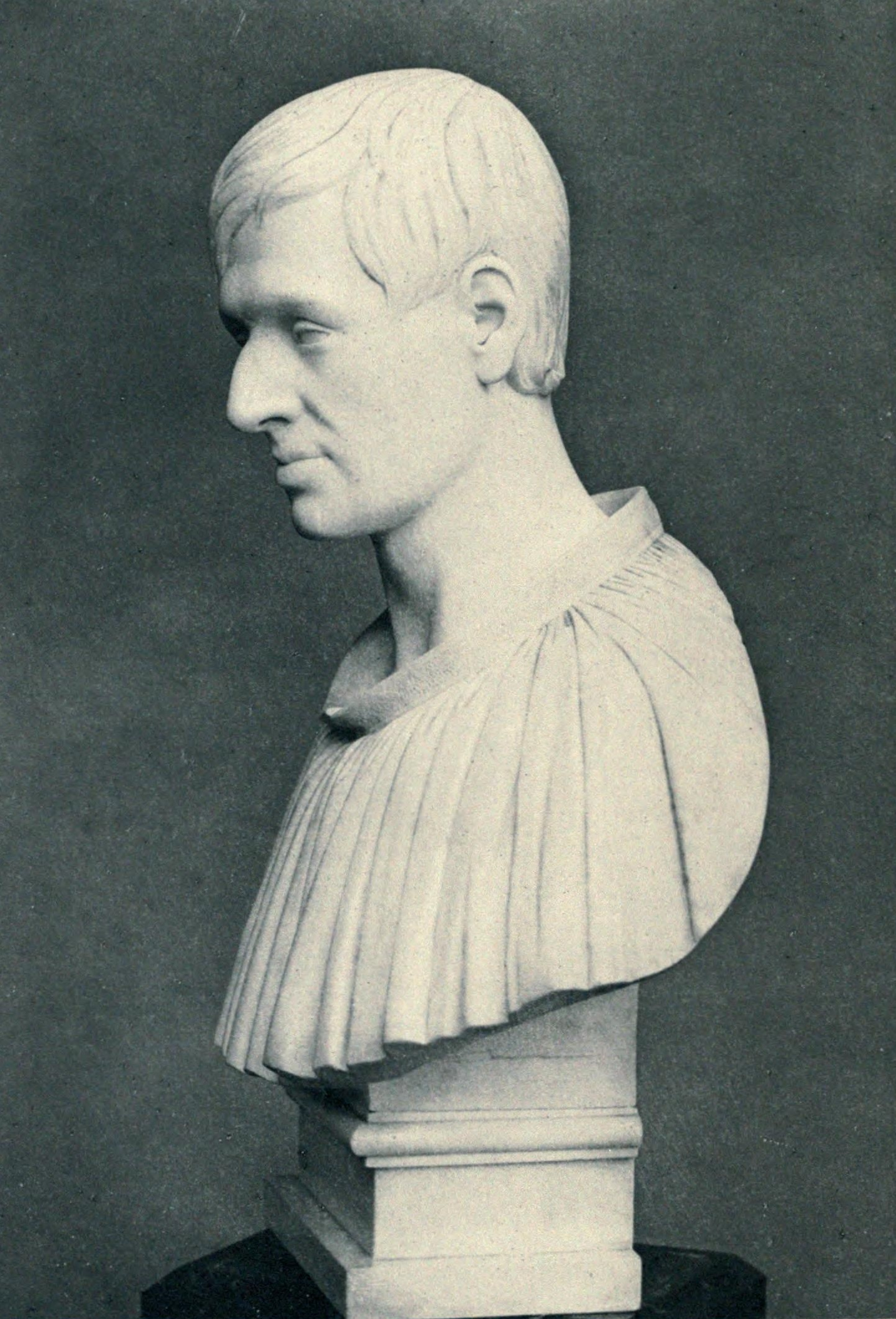
Bust by T. Westmacott, 1841

Newman believed in a middle way between free thinking and moral authority—one that would respect the rights of knowledge as well as the rights of revelation. His purpose was to build a Catholic university, in a world where the major Catholic universities on the European continent had recently been secularised, and most universities in the English-speaking world were Protestant. For a university to claim legitimacy in the larger world, it would have to support research and publication free from church censorship; however, for a university to be a safe place for the education of Catholic youth, it would have to be a place in which the teachings of the Catholic church were respected and promoted.

The University ... has this object and this mission; it contemplates neither moral impression nor mechanical production; it professes to exercise the mind neither in art nor in duty; its function is intellectual culture; here it may leave its scholars, and it has done its work when it has done as much as this. It educates the intellect to reason well in all matters, to reach out towards truth, and to grasp it.

This philosophy encountered opposition within the Catholic Church, at least in Ireland, as evidenced by the opinion of bishop Paul Cullen. In 1854 Cullen wrote a letter to the Vatican's Sacred Congregation for the Propagation of the Faith (now called the Dicastery for Evangelization), criticising Newman's liberal exercise of authority within the new university:

The discipline introduced is unsuitable, certainly to this country. The young men are allowed to go out at all hours, to smoke, etc., and there has not been any fixed time for study. All this makes it clear that Father Newman does not give enough attention to details.

The university as envisaged by Newman encountered too much opposition to prosper. However, his book did have a wide influence.

In 1858, Newman projected a branch house of the Oratory at Oxford; but this project was opposed by Father (later Cardinal) Henry Edward Manning, another influential convert from Anglicanism, and others. It was thought that the creation of a Catholic body within the heart of Oxford was likely to induce Catholics to send their sons to that university, rather than to newly formed Catholic universities. The scheme was abandoned. When Catholics did begin to attend Oxford from the 1860s onwards, a Catholic club was formed and, in 1888, it was renamed the Oxford University Newman Society in recognition of Newman's efforts on behalf of Catholicism in that university city. The Oxford Oratory was eventually founded over 100 years later in 1993.

In 1859, Newman established, in connection with the Birmingham Oratory, a school for the education of the sons of gentlemen along lines similar to those of English public schools. The Oratory School flourished as a boys' boarding school, and was one of a number which were to be dubbed "The Catholic Eton". Newman's published writings and sermons had a profound influence on one of the greatest of American educators, William Augustus Muhlenberg (1796–1877). At his model schools on Long Island (1828, 1836), Muhlenberg would sometimes read Newman's sermons to the boys. Muhlenberg, pioneer of a new kind of education in America, and a staunch Protestant, distanced himself from Newman when the latter converted to the Roman Church in 1845. But the influence went deep, nonetheless, as can be seen in the literary remains of Muhlenberg's former pupils, especially in those of the missionary school-maker Lloyd Breck (1818–1876) and John Barrett Kerfoot (1816–1881), founder of Saint James School of Maryland.

=== Relationships with other converts ===
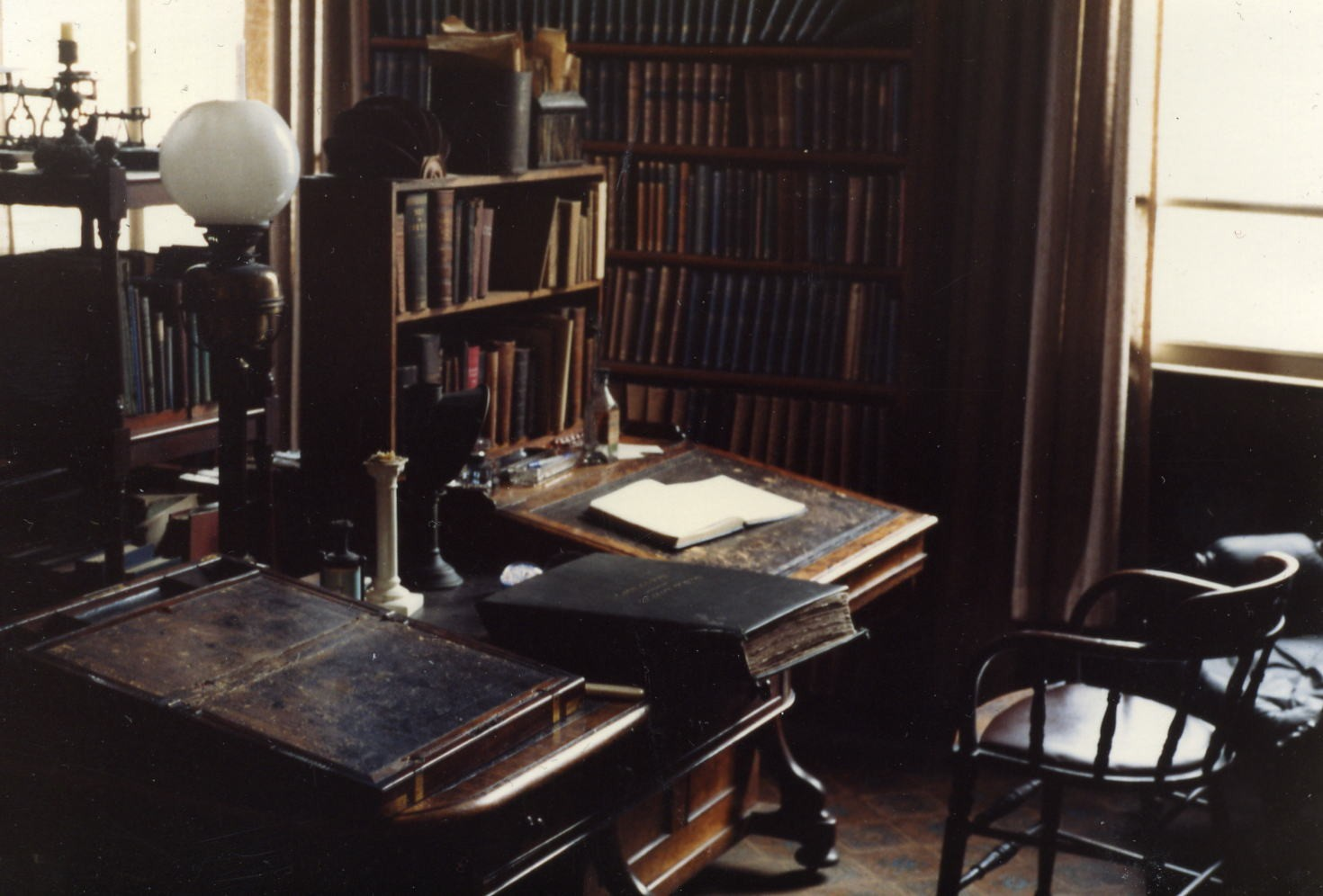
Newman's desk in the Birmingham Oratory

Newman had a special concern in the publisher Burns & Oates; the owner, James Burns, had published some of the Tractarians, and Burns had himself converted to Catholicism in 1847. Newman published several books with the company, effectively saving it. There is even a story that Newman's novel Loss and Gain was written specifically to assist Burns. In 1863, in a response to Thomas William Allies, while agreeing that slavery was bad, Newman would not publicly condemn it as "intrinsically evil" on the grounds that it had been tolerated by St Paul—thus asserting that slavery is "a condition of life ordained by God in the same sense that other conditions of life are".

Newman and Henry Edward Manning both became significant figures in the late 19th-century Catholic Church in England: both were Anglican converts and both were elevated to the dignity of cardinal. Despite these similarities, there was a lack of sympathy between the two men who were different in character and experience, and they clashed on a number of issues, in particular the foundation of an Oratory in Oxford. On theological issues, Newman had reservations about the declaration of papal infallibility (Manning favoured the formal declaration of the doctrine). Newman, while personally convinced, as a matter of theological opinion, of papal infallibility, opposed its definition as dogma, fearing that the definition might be expressed in over-broad terms open to misunderstanding.

George W. E. Russell recorded:

When Newman died there appeared in a monthly magazine a series of very unflattering sketches by one who had lived under his roof. I ventured to ask Cardinal Manning if he had seen these sketches. He replied that he had and thought them very shocking; the writer must have a very unenviable mind, &c., and then, having thus sacrificed to propriety, after a moment's pause he added: "But if you ask me if they are like poor Newman, I am bound to say—a photograph."

== Apologia ==
Newman's personal coat of arms upon his elevation to the cardinalate. The Latin motto, Cor ad cor loquitur, translates as 'heart speaks unto heart'.

In 1862, Newman began to prepare autobiographical and other memoranda to vindicate his career. The occasion came when, in the January 1864 issue of Macmillan's Magazine, Charles Kingsley, reviewing James Anthony Froude's History of England, incidentally asserted that "Truth, for its own sake, had never been a virtue with the Roman clergy. Father Newman informs us that it need not, and on the whole ought not to be." Edward Lowth Badeley, who had been a close legal adviser to Newman since the Achilli trial, encouraged him to make a robust rebuttal. After some preliminary sparring between the two, in which Kingsley refused to admit any fault, Newman published a pamphlet, Mr. Kingsley and Dr. Newman: A Correspondence on the Question Whether Dr. Newman Teaches That Truth Is No Virtue? (published in 1864 and not reprinted until 1913). The pamphlet has been described as "unsurpassed in the English language for the vigour of its satire". However, the anger displayed was later, in a letter to Sir William Cope, admitted to have been largely feigned. After the debate went public, Kingsley attempted to defend his assertion in a lengthy pamphlet entitled What, Then, Does Dr. Newman Mean?, described by a historian as "one of the most momentous rhetorical and polemical failures of the Victorian age".

In answer to Kingsley Newman published his Apologia Pro Vita Sua, a religious autobiography, in seven weekly parts starting on 21 April, followed by an appendix two weeks after the seventh part. Its tone changed the popular estimate of its author, by explaining the convictions which had led him into the Catholic Church. Kingsley's general accusation against the Catholic clergy is dealt with in the seventh part in the work; his specific accusations are addressed in an appendix. Newman maintains that English Catholic priests are at least as truthful as English Catholic laymen. Newman published a revision of the series of pamphlets in book form in 1865; in 1913 a combined critical edition, edited by Wilfrid Ward, was published. In the book, Newman wrote, "[T]here are but two alternatives, the way to Rome, and the way to Atheism." In the conclusion of the Apologia, Newman expressed sympathy for the Liberal Catholicism of Charles de Montalembert and Jean-Baptiste Henri Lacordaire: "In their general line of thought and conduct I enthusiastically concur, and consider them to be before their age."

== Later years and death ==
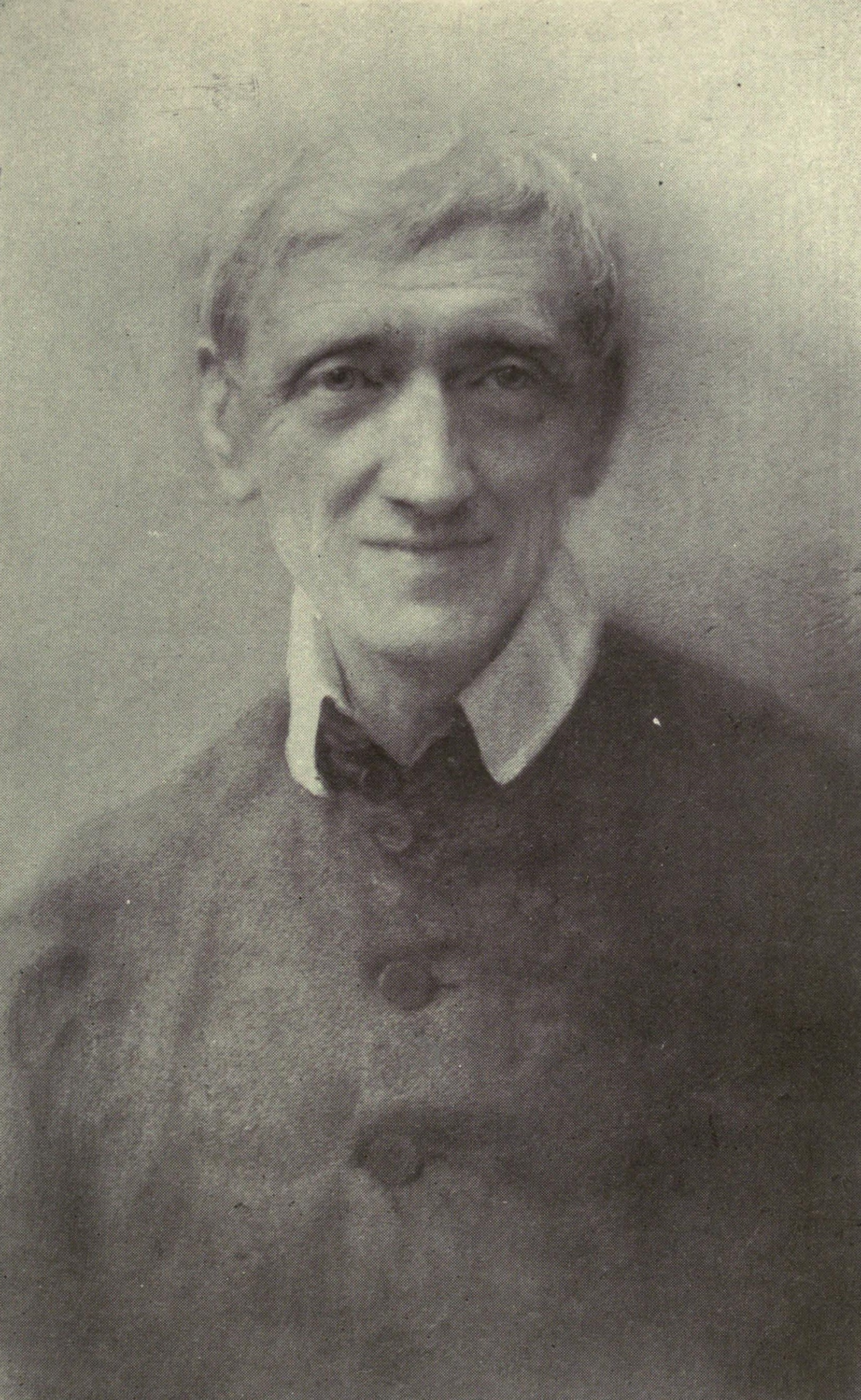
Painting by Jane Fortescue Seymour, c. 1876

In 1870, Newman published his Grammar of Assent, a closely reasoned work in which the case for religious belief is maintained by arguments somewhat different from those commonly used by Catholic theologians of the time. In 1877, in the republication of his Anglican works, he added to the two volumes containing his defence of the via media, a long preface in which he criticised and replied to anti-Catholic arguments of his own which were contained in the original works.

At the time of the First Vatican Council (1869–1870), Newman was uneasy about the formal definition of the doctrine of papal infallibility, believing that the time was "inopportune". In a private letter to his bishop (William Bernard Ullathorne), surreptitiously published, he denounced the "insolent and aggressive faction" that had pushed the matter forward. Newman gave no sign of disapproval when the doctrine was finally defined, but was an advocate of the "principle of minimising", that included very few papal declarations within the scope of infallibility. Subsequently, in a letter nominally addressed to the Duke of Norfolk when Gladstone accused the Roman church of having "equally repudiated modern thought and ancient history", Newman affirmed that he had always believed in the doctrine, and had only feared the deterrent effect of its definition on conversions on account of acknowledged historical difficulties. In this letter, and especially in the postscript to the second edition, Newman answered the charge that he was not at ease within the Catholic Church.

=== Cardinalate ===
In 1878, Newman's old college elected him an honorary fellow, and he revisited Oxford after an interval of thirty-two years, on the same day Pope Pius IX died. Pius had mistrusted Newman but his successor, Pope Leo XIII, was encouraged by the Duke of Norfolk and other English Catholic laymen to make Newman a cardinal, despite the fact that he was neither a bishop nor resident in Rome.

Cardinal Manning seems not to have been interested in having Newman become a cardinal and remained silent when the Pope asked him about it. Ullathorne, as Newman's immediate superior, sent word to Pope Leo that he would welcome the honour. The offer was made by Rome in February 1879. Newman accepted the gesture as a vindication of his work, but made two requests: that he not be consecrated a bishop on receiving the cardinalate, as was usual at that time; and that he might remain in Birmingham. Newman was elevated to the rank of cardinal in the consistory of 12 May 1879 by Pope Leo XIII, who assigned him the Deaconry of San Giorgio al Velabro. While in Rome, Newman insisted on the lifelong consistency of his opposition to "liberalism in religion"; he argued it would lead to complete relativism.

=== Death ===
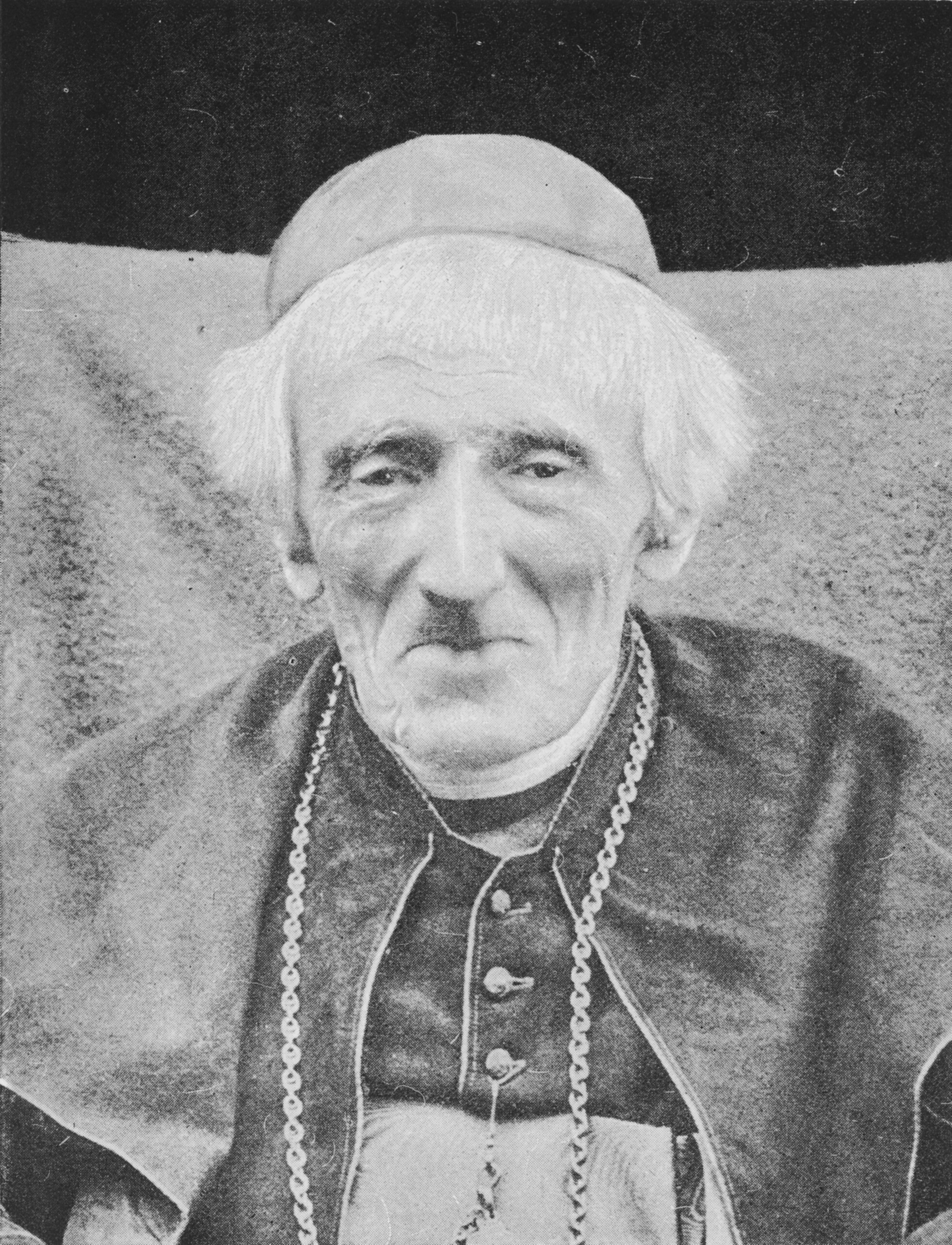
Newman in May 1890

After an illness, Newman returned to England and lived at the Birmingham Oratory until his death, making occasional visits to London and chiefly to his old friend R. W. Church, now Dean of St Paul's. As a cardinal, Newman published nothing beyond a preface to a work by Arthur Wollaston Hutton on the Anglican ministry (1879) and an article, "On the Inspiration of Scripture", in The Nineteenth Century (February 1884). In 1880, Newman confessed to an "extreme joy" that Conservative Benjamin Disraeli was no longer in power, and expressed the hope that Disraeli would be gone permanently.

From the latter half of 1886, Newman's health began to fail. He celebrated Mass for the last time on Christmas Day in 1889. On 11 August 1890 he died of pneumonia at the Birmingham Oratory. Eight days later his body was buried alongside Ambrose St. John in the cemetery at Rednal Hill, Birmingham, at the country house of the oratory. In accordance with his express wishes, Newman was buried in the grave of his lifelong friend Ambrose St. John.

The pall over the coffin bore the motto that Newman adopted for use as a cardinal, Cor ad cor loquitur ("Heart speaks to heart"), which William Barry, writing in the Catholic Encyclopedia (1913), traces to Francis de Sales and sees as revealing the secret of Newman's "eloquence, unaffected, graceful, tender, and penetrating". Ambrose St. John had become a Roman Catholic at around the same time as Newman, and the two men have a joint memorial stone inscribed with the motto Newman had chosen, Ex umbris et imaginibus in veritatem ("Out of shadows and phantasms into the truth"), which Barry traces to Plato's allegory of the cave. On 27 February 1891, Newman's estate was probated at £4,206.

=== Remains ===
Newman's grave was opened on 2 October 2008, with the intention of moving any remains to a tomb inside Birmingham Oratory for their veneration as relics during Newman's consideration for sainthood; however, the wooden coffin was found to have disintegrated and no bones were found. A representative of the Fathers of the Birmingham Oratory alleged that this was because the coffin was wooden and the burial took place at a damp site. Contemporary sources show that the coffin was covered with a softer type of soil than the clay marl of the grave site. Forensic expert John Hunter, from the University of Birmingham, tested soil samples from near the grave and said that total disappearance of a body was unlikely over that timescale. He said that extreme conditions which could remove bone would also have removed the coffin handles, which were extant.

== Writer ==
Some of Newman's short and earlier poems are described by R. H. Hutton as "unequalled for grandeur of outline, purity of taste and radiance of total effect"; while his latest and longest, The Dream of Gerontius, attempts to represent the unseen world along the same lines as Dante. His prose style, especially in his Catholic days, is fresh and vigorous and is attractive to many who do not sympathise with his conclusions, from the apparent candour with which difficulties are admitted and grappled; while in his private correspondence, there is charm. James Joyce, an Irish novelist, poet, and literary critic, had a lifelong admiration for Newman's writing style and in a letter to his patron Harriet Shaw Weaver remarked about Newman that "nobody has ever written English prose that can be compared with that of a tiresome footling little Anglican parson who afterwards became a prince of the only true church".

== Theologian ==
Newman defined theology as "the Science of God, or the truths we know about God, put into a system, just as we have a science of the stars and call it astronomy, or of the crust of the earth and call it geology". Around 1830, Newman developed a distinction between natural religion and revealed religion. Revealed religion is the Christian revelation which finds its fulfilment in Jesus Christ. Natural religion refers to the knowledge of God and divine things that has been acquired outside the Christian revelation. For Newman, this knowledge of God is not the result of unaided reason but of reason aided by grace, and so he speaks of natural religion as containing a revelation, even though it is an incomplete revelation.

Newman's view of natural religion gives rise to passages in his writings in which he appears to sympathise with a broader theology. Both as an Anglican and as a Catholic, he put forward the notion of a universal revelation. As an Anglican, Newman subscribed to this notion in various works, among them the 1830 University Sermon entitled "The Influence of Natural and Revealed Religion Respectively", the 1833 poem "Heathenism", and the book The Arians of the Fourth Century, also 1833, where he admits that there was "something true and divinely revealed in every religion". As a Catholic, he included the idea in A Grammar of Assent: "As far as we know, there never was a time when ... revelation was not a revelation continuous and systematic, with distinct representatives and an orderly succession."

Newman held that "freedom from symbols and articles is abstractedly the highest state of Christian communion", but was "the peculiar privilege of the primitive Church". In 1877 he allowed that "in a religion that embraces large and separate classes of adherents there always is of necessity to a certain extent an exoteric and an esoteric doctrine". Newman was worried about the new dogma of papal infallibility advocated by an "aggressive and insolent faction", fearing that the definition might be expressed in over-broad terms open to misunderstanding and would pit religious authority against physical science. He was relieved about the moderate tone of the eventual definition, which "affirmed the pope's infallibility only within a strictly limited province: the doctrine of faith and morals initially given to the apostolic Church and handed down in Scripture and tradition."

== Character and relationships ==
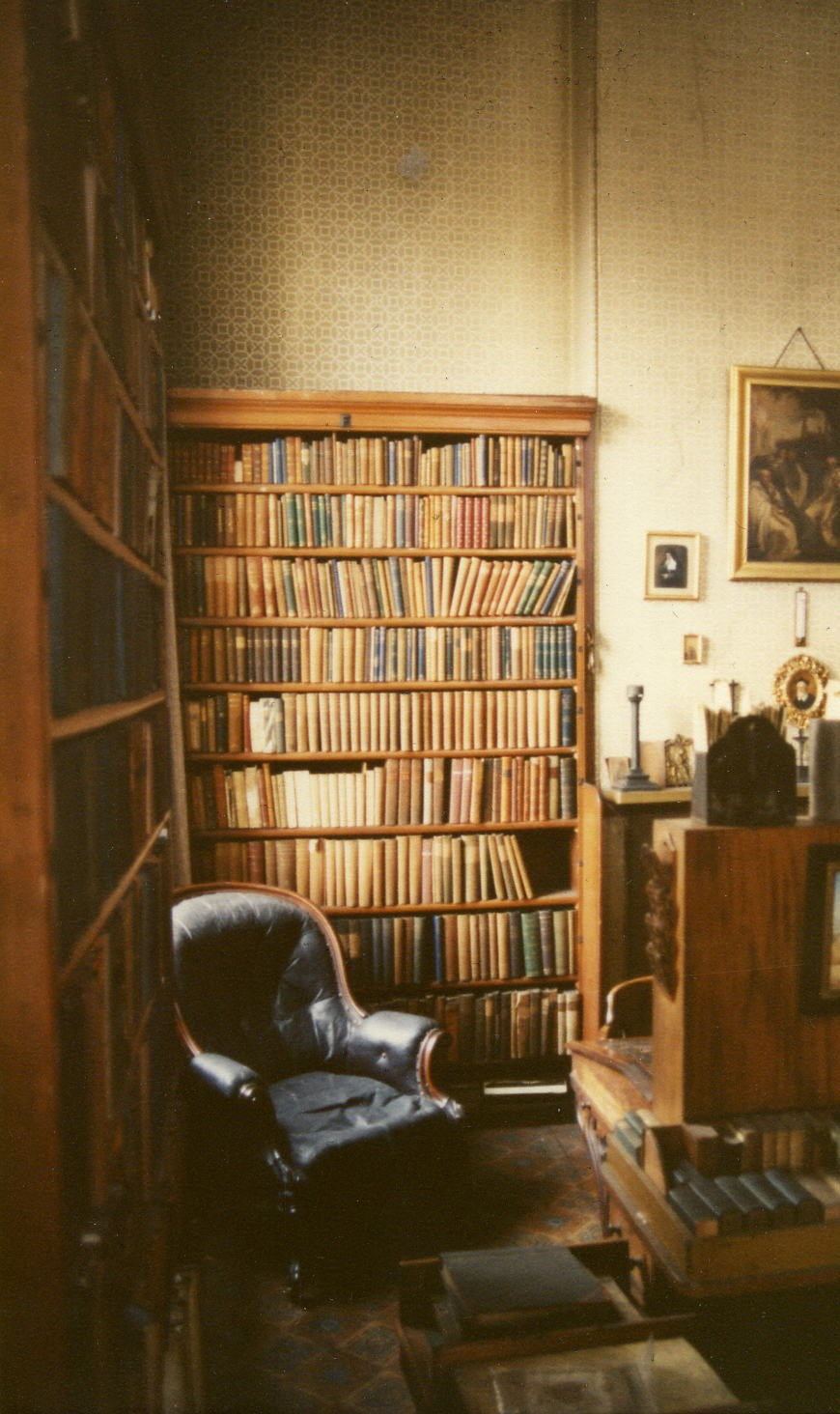
Newman's room in the Birmingham Oratory

A 2001 biography of Newman notes that since his death in 1890, he has suffered almost as much misrepresentation as he did during his lifetime. In the Apologia he had exorcised the phantom which, as he said, "gibbers instead of me"—the phantom of the secret Romanist, corrupting the youth of Oxford, devious and dissimulating. But he raised another phantom—that of the oversensitive, self-absorbed recluse who never did anything but think and write. Unwary readers took the Apologia as autobiography, but it is strictly what Newman called its first parts—"A History of My Religious Opinions".

In Newman's letters and memoranda and those of his friends, a more outgoing and humorous character is revealed. Newman lived in the world of his time, travelling by train as soon as engines were built and rail lines laid, and writing amusing letters about his adventures on railways and ships, and during his travels in Scotland and Ireland. He was an indefatigable walker, and as a young don at Oriel he often went out riding with Hurrell Froude and other friends. At Oxford he had an active pastoral life as an Anglican priest, though nothing of it appears in the Apologia. Later he was active as a Catholic priest. His parishioners at the Oratory, apart from a few professional men and their families, were mainly factory workers, Irish immigrants, and tradespeople. He was a caring pastor, and their recorded reminiscences show that they held him in affection.

Newman, who was only a few years younger than Keats and Shelley, was born into the Romantic generation when Englishmen still wept in moments of emotion. But he lived on into the age of the stiff upper lip, with the result that later generations, hearing of his tears on a visit to his mother's grave or at the funerals of old friends such as Henry Wilberforce, thought him not only sensitive but melancholy.

Described as the "sensitive recluse of legend", Newman had a wide currency, appearing for instance in Lytton Strachey's description, in his famously debunking set of portraits Eminent Victorians, as Newman's "soft, spectacled, Oxford manner, with its half-effeminate diffidence". Geoffrey Faber, whose own account of Newman in Oxford Apostles was far from hagiographic, found Strachey's portrait a distasteful caricature, bearing scant likeness to the Newman of history and designed solely "to tickle the self-conceit of a cynical and beliefless generation". In Strachey's account, however, the true villain is Cardinal Manning, who is accused of secretly briefing the Press with the false story that Newman would turn down the Cardinalate, and who privately said of his late "friend": "Poor Newman! He was a great hater!".

Strachey was only ten when Newman died, and they never met. In contrast to Strachey's account, James Anthony Froude, Hurrell Froude's brother, who knew Newman at Oxford, saw him as a Carlylean hero. Compared with Newman, Froude wrote, Keble, Pusey, and the other Tractarians "were all but as ciphers, and he the indicating number". Newman's face was "remarkably like that of Julius Caesar. ...I have often thought of the resemblance, and believed that it extended to the temperament. In both there was an original force of character which refused to be moulded by circumstances, which was to make its own way, and become a power in the world; a clearness of intellectual perception, a disdain for conventionalities, a temper imperious and wilful, but along with it a most attaching gentleness, sweetness, singleness of heart and purpose. Both were formed by nature to command others, both had the faculty of attracting to themselves the passionate devotion of their friends and followers. ... For hundreds of young men Credo in Newmannum was the veritable symbol of faith."

=== Celibacy ===
Newman's celibacy, which he embraced at the age of 15, also contributed to negative representations of his character, laying him open to what he called "slurs". To exponents of muscular Christianity such as Charles Kingsley, celibacy was synonymous with unmanliness. Kingsley, who interpreted the Biblical story of Adam and Eve as expressing a "binary law of man's being; the want of a complementum, a 'help meet', without whom it is not good for him to be", feared and hated vowed sexual abstinence, considering it, in Laura Fasick's words, "a distinct and separate perversion". The charge of effeminacy was aimed not just at Newman but at Tractarians and Roman Catholics in general. "In all that school", wrote Kingsley in 1851, "there is an element of foppery—even in dress and manner; a fastidious, maundering, die-away effeminacy, which is mistaken for purity and refinement". John Cornwell comments that "the notion of Newman's effeminacy tells us more about the reaction of others to him at the time than [about] any tendency in his own nature".

To many members of the Oxford Movement, Newman included, it was Kingsley's ideal of domesticity that seemed unmanly. As R. W. Church put it, "To shrink from [celibacy] was a mark of want of strength or intelligence, of an unmanly preference for English home life, of insensibility to the generous devotion and purity of the saints". Defending his decision to remain single, Charles Reding, the hero of Newman's novel Loss and Gain, argues that "surely the idea of an Apostle, unmarried, pure, in fast and nakedness, and at length a martyr, is a higher idea than that of one of the old Israelites sitting under his vine and fig-tree, full of temporal goods, and surrounded by sons and grandsons?" James Eli Adams remarks that if manliness is equated with physical and psychological toughness, then perhaps "manhood cannot be sustained within domesticity, since the ideal is incompatible with ease". A "common antagonism to domesticity" links "Tractarian discipline to Carlylean heroism".

=== Friendships ===
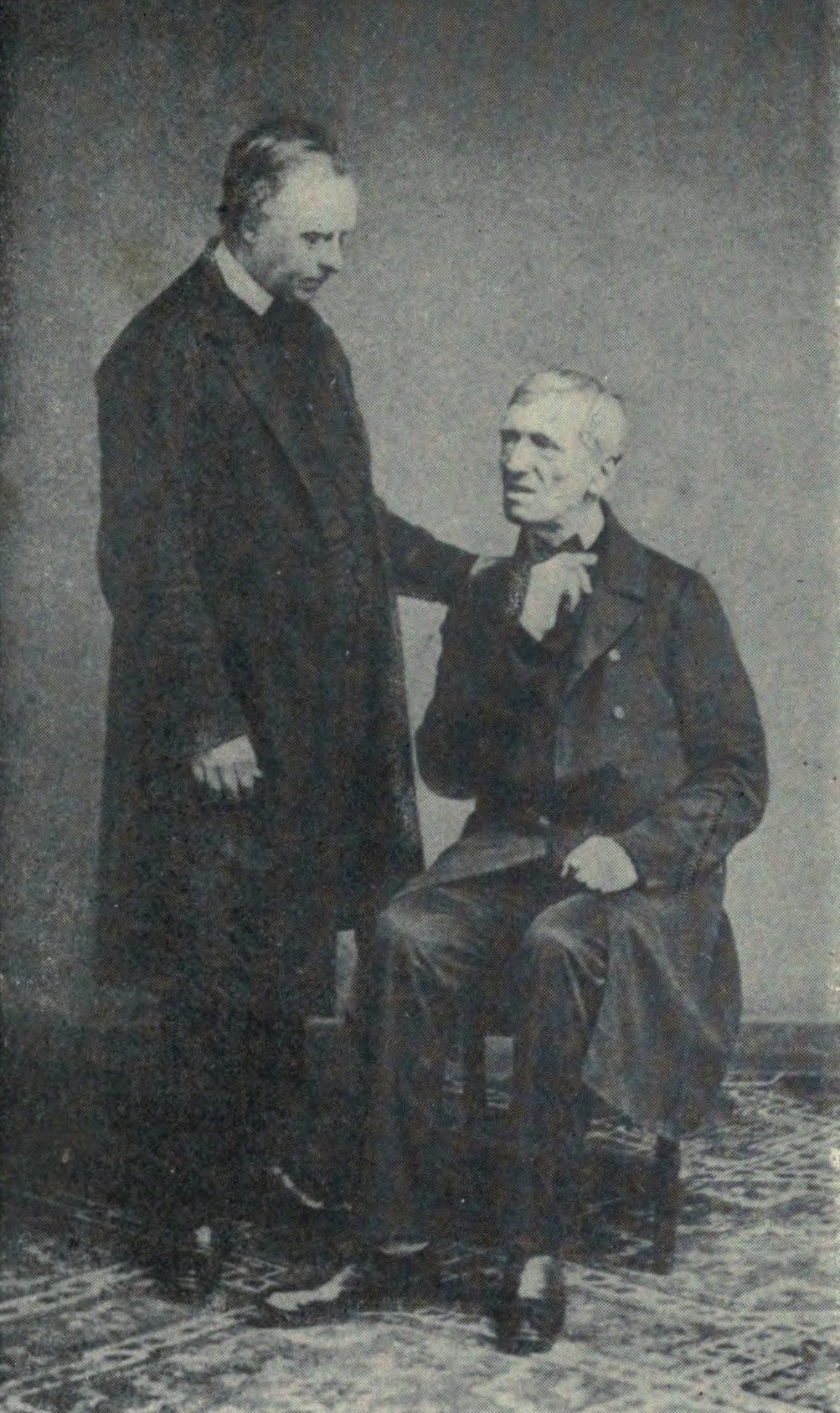
Ambrose St. John (left) and Newman (right)

Although Newman's deepest relationships were with men, he had many affectionate friendships with women. One of the most important was with Maria Giberne, who knew him in his youth and followed him into the Catholic Church. She was a noted beauty, who at age fifty was described by one admirer as "the handsomest woman I ever saw in my life". A gifted amateur artist, she painted many portraits of Newman at various periods, as well as several of the pictures hanging in the Birmingham Oratory. Newman had a photographic portrait of her in his room and was still corresponding with her into their eighties. Emily Bowles, who first met Newman at Littlemore, was the recipient of some of his most outspoken letters on what he felt to be the mistaken course of the extreme infallibilists and his reasons for not "speaking out" as many begged him to do. When she visited Newman at the Birmingham Oratory in 1861, she was welcomed by him "as only he can welcome"; she would never forget "the brightness that lit up his worn face as he received me at the door, carrying in several packages himself".

Newman also experienced close male friendships, the first with Richard Hurrell Froude (1803–1836), the longest with Ambrose St John (1815–1875), who shared communitarian life with Newman for 32 years starting in 1843 (when St John was 28). Newman wrote after St John's death: "I have ever thought no bereavement was equal to that of a husband's or a wife's, but I feel it difficult to believe that any can be greater, or any one's sorrow greater, than mine". He directed that he be buried in the same grave as St John: "I wish, with all my heart, to be buried in Fr Ambrose St John's grave—and I give this as my last, my imperative will".

Newman spelt out his theology of friendship in a sermon he preached on the Feast of St John the Evangelist, "whom Jesus loved". In the sermon, Newman said: "There have been men before now, who have supposed Christian love was so diffuse as not to admit of concentration upon individuals; so that we ought to love all men equally. ... Now I shall maintain here, in opposition to such notions of Christian love, and with our Saviour's pattern before me, that the best preparation for loving the world at large, and loving it duly and wisely, is to cultivate our intimate friendship and affection towards those who are immediately about us". For Newman, friendship is an intimation of a greater love, a foretaste of heaven. In friendship, two intimate friends gain a glimpse of the life that awaits them in God. Juan R. Vélez writes that someday Newman "may well earn a new title, that of Doctor amicitiae: Doctor of the Church on Friendship. His biography is a treatise on the human and supernatural virtues that make up friendship".

=== Discussion about potential homosexuality ===
David Hilliard characterises Geoffrey Faber's description of Newman, in his 1933 book Oxford Apostles, as a "portrait of Newman as a sublimated homosexual (though the word itself was not used)". On Newman's relations with Hurrell Froude, Faber wrote: "Of all his friends Froude filled the deepest place in his heart, and I'm not the first to point out that his occasional notions of marrying definitely ceased with the beginning of his real intimacy with Froude". However, while Faber's theory has had considerable popular influence, scholars of the Oxford Movement tend either to dismiss it entirely or to view it with great scepticism, with even scholars specifically concerned with same-sex desire hesitating to endorse it.

Ellis Hanson, for instance, writes that Newman and Froude clearly "presented a challenge to Victorian gender norms", but "Faber's reading of Newman's sexlessness and Hurrell Froude's guilt as evidence of homosexuality" seems "strained". When John Campbell Shairp combines masculine and feminine imagery in his highly poetic description of Newman's preaching style at Oxford in the early 1840s, Frederick S. Roden is put in mind of "the late Victorian definition of a male invert, the homosexual: his (Newman's) homiletics suggest a woman's soul in a man's body". Roden, however, does not argue that Newman was homosexual, seeing him rather—particularly in his professed celibacy—as a "cultural dissident" or "queer". Roden uses the term "queer" in a very general sense "to include any dissonant behaviours, discourses or claimed identities" in relation to Victorian norms. In this sense, "Victorian Roman and Anglo-Catholicism were culturally queer". In Newman's case, Roden writes, "homoaffectivity" (found in heterosexuals and homosexuals alike) "is contained in friendships, in relationships that are not overtly sexual".

In a September 2010 television documentary, The Trouble with the Pope, Peter Tatchell discussed Newman's underlying sexuality, citing his close friendship with Ambrose St John and entries in Newman's diaries describing their fond love for each other. Alan Bray, however, in his 2003 book The Friend, saw the bond between the two men as "entirely spiritual", noting that Newman, when speaking of St John, echoes the language of John's gospel. Shortly after St John's death, Bray adds, Newman recorded "a conversation between them before St John lost his speech in those final days. He expressed his hope, Newman wrote, that during his whole priestly life he had not committed one mortal sin. For men of their time and culture that statement is definitive. ... Newman's burial with Ambrose St John cannot be detached from his understanding of the place of friendship in Christian belief or its long history". Bray cites numerous examples of friends being buried together. Newman's burial with St John was not unusual at the time and did not draw contemporary comment.

David Hilliard writes that relationships such as Newman's with Froude and St John "were not regarded by contemporaries as unnatural. ... Nor is it possible, on the basis of passionate words uttered by mid-Victorians, to make a clear distinction between male affection and homosexual feeling. Theirs was a generation prepared to accept romantic friendships between men simply as friendships without sexual significance. Only with the emergence in the late nineteenth century of the doctrine of the stiff upper lip and the concept of homosexuality as an identifiable condition, did open expressions of love between men become suspect and regarded in a new light as morally undesirable". Men born in the first decades of the nineteenth century had a capacity, which did not survive into later generations, for intense male friendships. The friendship of Alfred Tennyson and Arthur Hallam, immortalised in In Memoriam A.H.H., is a famous example. Less well-known is that of Charles Kingsley and his closest friend at Cambridge, Charles Mansfield.

When Ian Ker reissued his biography of Newman in 2009, he added an afterword in which he put forward evidence that Newman was a heterosexual. He cited journal entries from December 1816 in which the 15-year-old Newman prayed to be preserved from the temptations awaiting him when he returned from boarding school and met girls at Christmas dances and parties. As an adult, Newman wrote about the deep pain of the "sacrifice" of the life of celibacy. Ker comments: "The only 'sacrifice' that he could possibly be referring to was that of marriage. And he readily acknowledges that from time to time he continued to feel the natural attraction for marriage that any heterosexual man would." In 1833, Newman wrote that, despite having "willingly" accepted the call to celibacy, he felt "not the less ... the need" of "the sort of interest [sympathy] which a wife takes and none but she—it is a woman's interest".

== Influence and legacy ==
Within both the Anglican and Roman Catholic churches, Newman's influence was great in dogma. For the Roman Catholic Church in Britain, Newman's conversion secured prestige. On Catholics, his influence was mainly in the direction of a broader spirit and of a recognition of the part played by development, in doctrine and in church government. He is also remembered for his famous quote "To be deep in history is to cease to be a Protestant." If his teaching on the church was less widely followed, it was because of doubts as to the thoroughness of his knowledge of history and as to his freedom from bias as a critic. Catholic Cardinal Marc Ouellet, then Prefect of the then Congregation for Bishops, has said that Newman qualifies to be a Doctor of the Church, ranking with Athanasius and Augustine. On 31 July 2025, Pope Leo XIV confirmed that Saint John Henry Newman would soon be proclaimed a Doctor of the Church, and this proclamation was carried out in Rome on 1 November 2025.

=== Tertiary education ===
Newman founded the independent school for boys Catholic University School, Dublin, and the Catholic University of Ireland which evolved into University College Dublin, a college of Ireland's largest university, the National University of Ireland. A number of Newman Societies (or Newman Centers in the United States) in Newman's honour have been established throughout the world, in the mould of the Oxford University Newman Society. They provide pastoral services and ministries to Catholics at non-Catholic universities; at various times this type of "campus ministry" (the distinction and definition being flexible) has been known to Catholics as the Newman Apostolate or "Newman movement". Additionally, colleges have been named for him in Birmingham, England; Melbourne, Australia; Edmonton, Canada; Thodupuzha, India, and Wichita, United States. Newman's Dublin lecture series The Idea of a University Defined and Illustrated is thought to have become "the basis of a characteristic British belief that education should aim at producing generalists rather than narrow specialists, and that non-vocational subjects—in arts or pure science—could train the mind in ways applicable to a wide range of jobs".

== Canonization ==
Saint John Henry Newman, C.O.
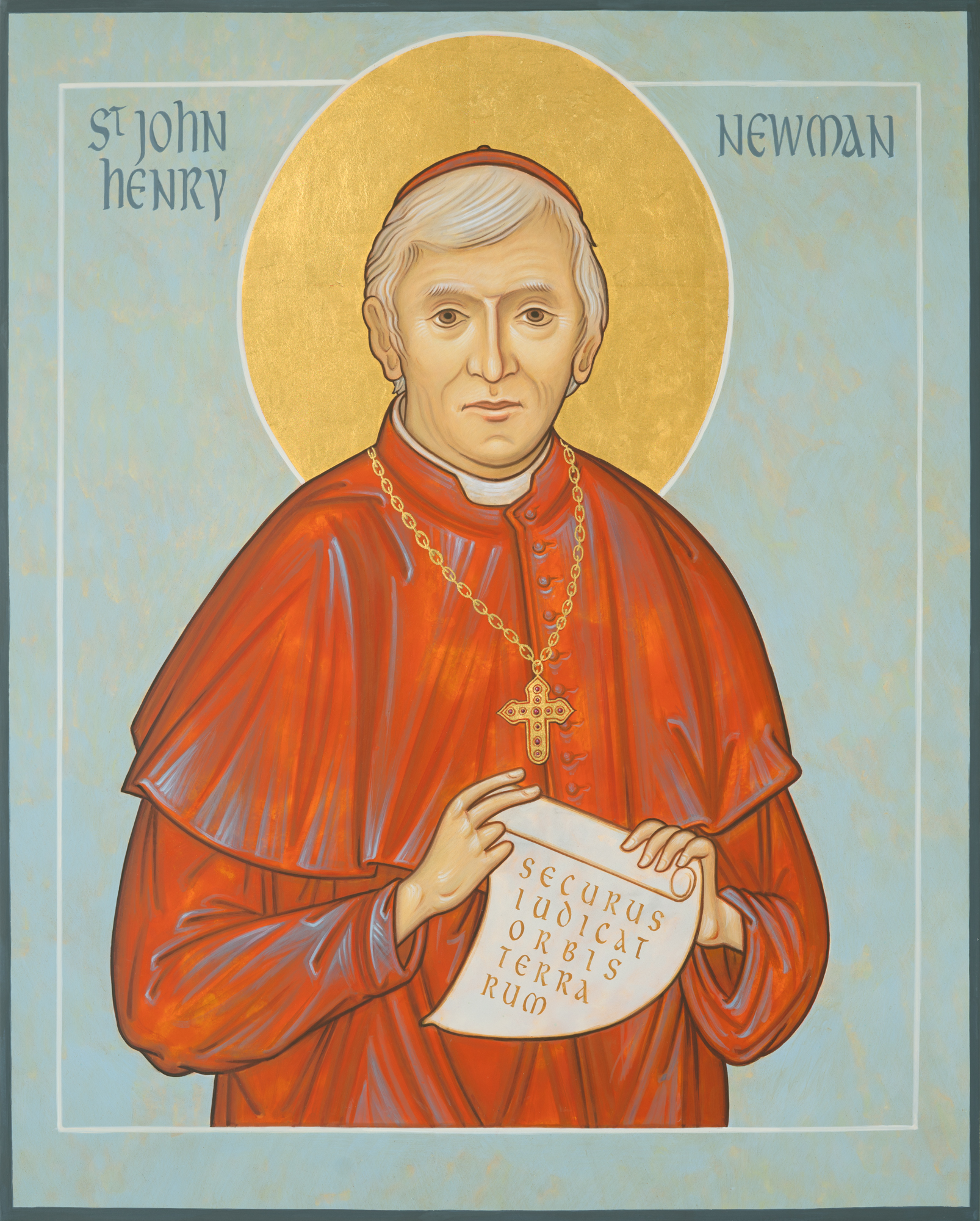
- Icon of Saint John Henry Newman written by Jacques Bihin in 2022

Priest and Doctor of the Church
- Born: 21 February 1801
- Died: 11 August 1890 (aged 89)
- Venerated in: Catholic Church, Anglo-Catholicism, Anglicanism
- Beatified: 19 September 2010 by Pope Benedict XVI
- Canonized: 13 October 2019 by Pope Francis
- Major shrine: Birmingham Oratory, Birmingham, England, United Kingdom
- Feast: 9 October
- Attributes: Cardinal's attire, Oratorian Habit
- Patronage: Personal Ordinariate of Our Lady of Walsingham

In 1991, Newman was proclaimed venerable by Pope John Paul II after a thorough examination of his life and work by the Congregation for the Causes of Saints. In 2001, Jack Sullivan, an American deacon from Marshfield, Massachusetts, attributed his recovery from a spinal cord disorder to the intercession of Newman. The miracle was accepted by the Holy See for Newman's beatification, which Pope Benedict XVI announced on 19 September 2010 during a visit to Britain.

The approval of a further miracle at the intercession of Newman was reported in November 2018: the healing of a pregnant woman from a grave illness. The decree approving this miracle was authorized to be promulgated on 12 February 2019. On 1 July 2019, with an affirmative vote, Newman's canonization was authorized and the date for the canonization ceremony was set for 13 October 2019. Newman was canonized on 13 October 2019, by Pope Francis, in St. Peter's Square. The ceremony was attended by the Prince of Wales (now Charles III), representing the United Kingdom.

=== Feast day ===
The general rule among Roman Catholics is to celebrate canonized or beatified persons on the date of their dies natalis, the day on which they died and are considered born into heaven. Newman's dies natalis is 11 August, the same day as the obligatory memorial of Saint Clare of Assisi in the General Roman Calendar which would take precedence. Thus, once Newman was beatified, the Congregation of the Oratory and the Catholic Bishops' Conference of England and Wales opted to place Newman's optional memorial on 9 October, the date of his conversion to Catholicism. This date was chosen because "it falls at the beginning of the University year; an area in which Newman had a particular interest".

On 1 November 2025, Pope Leo XIV declared Newman a Doctor of the Church. The following year, he made Newman's commemoration an optional memorial and inscribed it on the General Roman Calendar. Newman is remembered in the Church of England with a commemoration on 11 August. He is remembered in the Episcopal Church on 21 February.

== Works ==
=== Anglican period ===
- The Arians of the Fourth Century, New York: Longmans, Green, and Co. (1911).
- Tracts for the Times (1833–1841)
- British Critic (1836–1842)
- Lyra Apostolica (poems mostly by Newman and Keble, collected 1836)
- On the Prophetical Office of the Church (1837)
- Lectures on Justification, London: J.G. & F. Rivington, (1838)
- Parochial and Plain Sermons (1834–1843)
  - Volume 1 (1834)
  - Volume 2 (1835)
  - Volume 3 (1836)
  - Volume 4 (1839)
  - Volume 5 (1840)
  - Volume 6 (1842)
  - Volume 7 (1842)
  - Volume 8 (1843)
- Select Treatises of St. Athanasius (1842, 1844)
- Essays on Miracles (1826, 1843)
- Oxford University Sermons (1843)
- Sermons on Subjects of the Day, London: J.G.F. & J. Rivington, (1843)
- Lives of the Saints
  - Volume 1, London: James Toovey, (1845)
  - Volume 2, London: James Toovey, (1845)
  - Volume 3, London: James Toovey, (1845)
  - Volume 4, London: James Toovey, (1844)
  - Volume 5, London: James Toovey, (1845)
  - Volume 6, London: James Toovey, (1845)
  - Volume 7, London: James Toovey, (1845)

=== Catholic period ===
- Essay on the Development of Christian Doctrine, New York: D. Appleton and Company (1845).
- Retractation of Anti-Catholic Statements (1845)
- Loss and Gain, London: James Burns, (novel – 1848)
- Faith and Prejudice and Other Unpublished Sermons (1848–1873; collected 1956)
- Discourses to Mixed Congregations, London: Longman, Brown, Green and Longmans, (1849)
- Lectures on Certain Difficulties Felt by Anglicans in Submitting to the Catholic Church, London: Burns & Lambert, (1850)
- Lectures on the Present Position of Catholics in England : Addressed to the Brothers of the Oratory, London: Burns & Lambert, (1851)
- The Idea of a University (1852 and 1858)
- Cathedra Sempiterna (1852)
- Callista, London: Burns and Lambert (novel – 1855)
- On Consulting the Faithful in Matters of Christian Doctrine (1859)
- The Rambler (editor) (1859–1860)
- Apologia Pro Vita Sua (religious autobiography – 1864; revised edition, 1865)
- Letter to Dr. Pusey (1865)
- The Dream of Gerontius (1865)
- An Essay in Aid of a Grammar of Assent (1870)
- Sermons Preached on Various Occasions (various/1874)
- Letter to the Duke of Norfolk (1875)
- Five Letters (1875)
- Sermon Notes (1849–1878)
- Select Treatises of St. Athanasius, London: Pickering, (1881).
- On the Inspiration of Scripture, London: K. Paul, (1884).
- Development of Religious Error, London: Isbister, (1885).
- The Second Spring: A Sermon, New York: Longmans, Green, and Co. (1911).

=== Other miscellaneous works ===
- Historical Tracts of St. Athanasius, Oxford: John Henry Parker, (1843).
- Achilli v. Newman: A Full and Authentic Report of the Above Prosecution for Libel, Tried Before Lord Campbell and a Special Jury, in the Court of Queen's Bench, Westminster, June, 1852, London: W. Strange, (1852).
- Lectures and Essays on University Subjects, London: Longman, Brown, Green. Longmans, and Roberts, (1859).
- Essays Critical and Historical, London: B.M. Pickering, (various/1871).
- Tracts Theological and Ecclesiastical, London: B.M. Pickering, (1874).
- Discussions and Arguments, London: Pickering, (1872).
- Historical Sketches (various/1872)
- Addresses to Cardinal Newman and His Replies, with Biglietto Speech (1879)

=== Selections ===
- Realizations: Newman's Own Selection of His Sermons (edited by Vincent Ferrer Blehl, S.J., 1964). Liturgical Press, 2009. ISBN 978-0-8146-3290-1
- Mary the Second Eve (compiled by Sister Eileen Breen, F.M.A., 1969). TAN Books, 2009. ISBN 978-0-89555-181-8
- Newman, John Henry (2006). Earnest, James David; Tracey, Gerard (eds.). Fifteen Sermons Preached Before the University of Oxford. Oxford University Press.

== See also ==
- Cardinal Newman Society
- Newman Center
- The Newman Society
- Newman Studies Journal
- Personal Ordinariate of Our Lady of Walsingham

Records
Preceded by Ferdinand-François-Auguste Donnet	Oldest living cardinal 23 December 1882 – 11 August 1890	Succeeded by Teodolfo Mertel
