= R. B. Seymour Sewell =

British military doctor and naturalist (1880–1964)

- Born: Robert Beresford Seymour Sewell; 5 March 1880; Leamington, Warwickshire
- Died: 11 February 1964 (aged 83)
- Known for: The Fauna of British India, Including Ceylon and Burma
- Awards: Fellow of the Royal Society

Lieutenant-Colonel Robert Beresford Seymour Sewell CIE FRS FLS FZS (5 March 1880 – 11 February 1964) was a British military doctor who served with the Indian Medical Service and served as a Surgeon Naturalist in the marine surveys, specialising on the taxonomy of copepods, and acted as an editor of The Fauna of British India, Including Ceylon and Burma 1933–1963.

Sewell was born in 1880 in Leamington, Warwickshire. His father was the reverend Arthur Sewell, and his mother was Mary Lee (née Waring). His grandfather was Robert Burleigh Sewell (1810–1872), who had a number of notable siblings, including Richard Clarke Sewell (1803–1864), William Sewell (1804–1874), Henry Sewell (1807–1879), James Edwards Sewell (1810–1903), and Elizabeth Missing Sewell (1815–1906). He spent six months under Raphael Weldon at the University College, London before joining Cambridge (Christ's College) and in 1905, St Bartholomew's Hospital, London. He received a B.A. (Hons) from Cambridge in 1902 and qualified M.R.C.S. & L.R.C.P. in 1907.

He was commissioned into the Indian Medical Service as a Lieutenant 1 February 1908 and was promoted Captain 1 February 1911. His first positions were as medical officer with the 67th and 84th Punjabi Regiments before working as a malaria officer in the Sialkote Brigade. He served during the First World War in Mesopotamia and was Mentioned in Dispatches in the London Gazette 6 July 1917. He was promoted Major 1 August 1919 and Lieutenant-Colonel 1 August 1927. He also served as a professor at the Calcutta medical college (1911–1913) and from 1910 to 1925 held the position of Surgeon Naturalist on the marine surveys aboard the RIMS Investigator. From 1925 he served as Director of the Zoological Survey of India from 17 July 1925 to his retirement. He worked on fishes that could help control malaria along with B.L. Chaudhuri. He retired from the Indian Medical Service in 1933 and was appointed CIE. He was also made leader of the John Murray expedition into the Indian Ocean.

He married Dorothy Dean (died 1931) in 1914. They had two daughters, one who became a nurse and the other a scholar of English literature. He was a freemason, having been initiated in 1912 in the Lodge Concordia at Calcutta.
