= Rookley =

Coordinates: 50.65482°N 1.28329°W

- Village
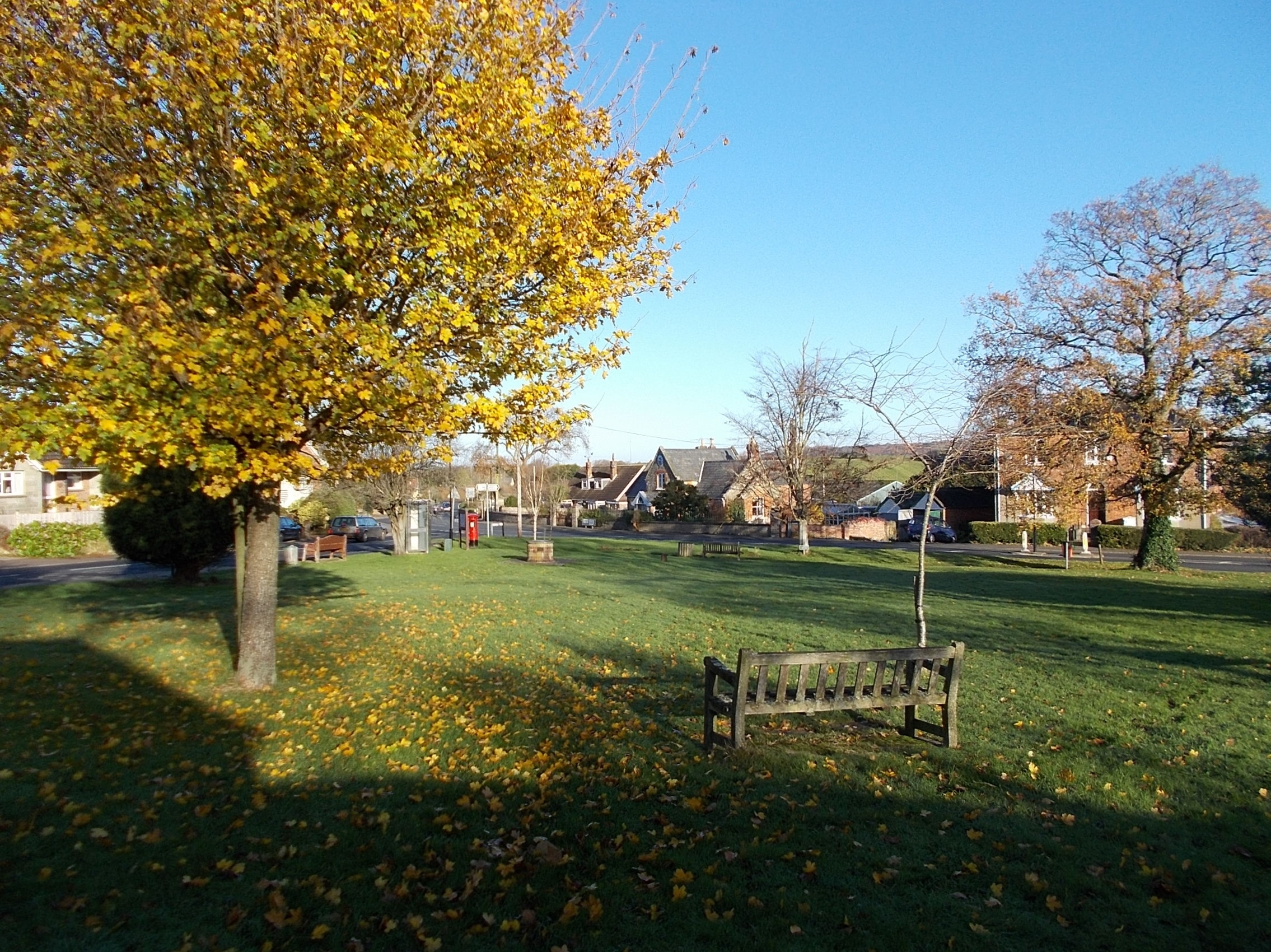
- Rookley village green

- Location within the Isle of Wight
- Population: 607
- OS grid reference: SZ507841
- Civil parish: Rookley
- Unitary authority: Isle of Wight
- Ceremonial county: Isle of Wight
- Region: South East
- Country: England
- Sovereign state: United Kingdom
- Post town: VENTNOR
- Postcode district: PO38
- Dialling code: 01983
- Police: Hampshire and Isle of Wight
- Fire: Hampshire and Isle of Wight
- Ambulance: Isle of Wight
- UK Parliament: Isle of Wight West

Rookley is a village and civil parish on the Isle of Wight. It is located five kilometres south of Newport near the centre of the island. The population of the civil parish was recorded in the 2021 census as 607.

It has a country park on the site of the last working Isle of Wight brickworks. There is a pub at the country park and another, the "Chequers", a short distance from the village. The latter was the centre of the island's smuggling trade in the 18th century.

== Name ==
The name means 'the wood or woodland clearing frequented by rooks', from Old English hrōc and lēah, the wood probably referring to Bunkers Copse, a small woodland in the village.

1202: Roclee

1235: Rokele

1328: Roukley

1583: Rookeley

1769: Rookley

== History ==
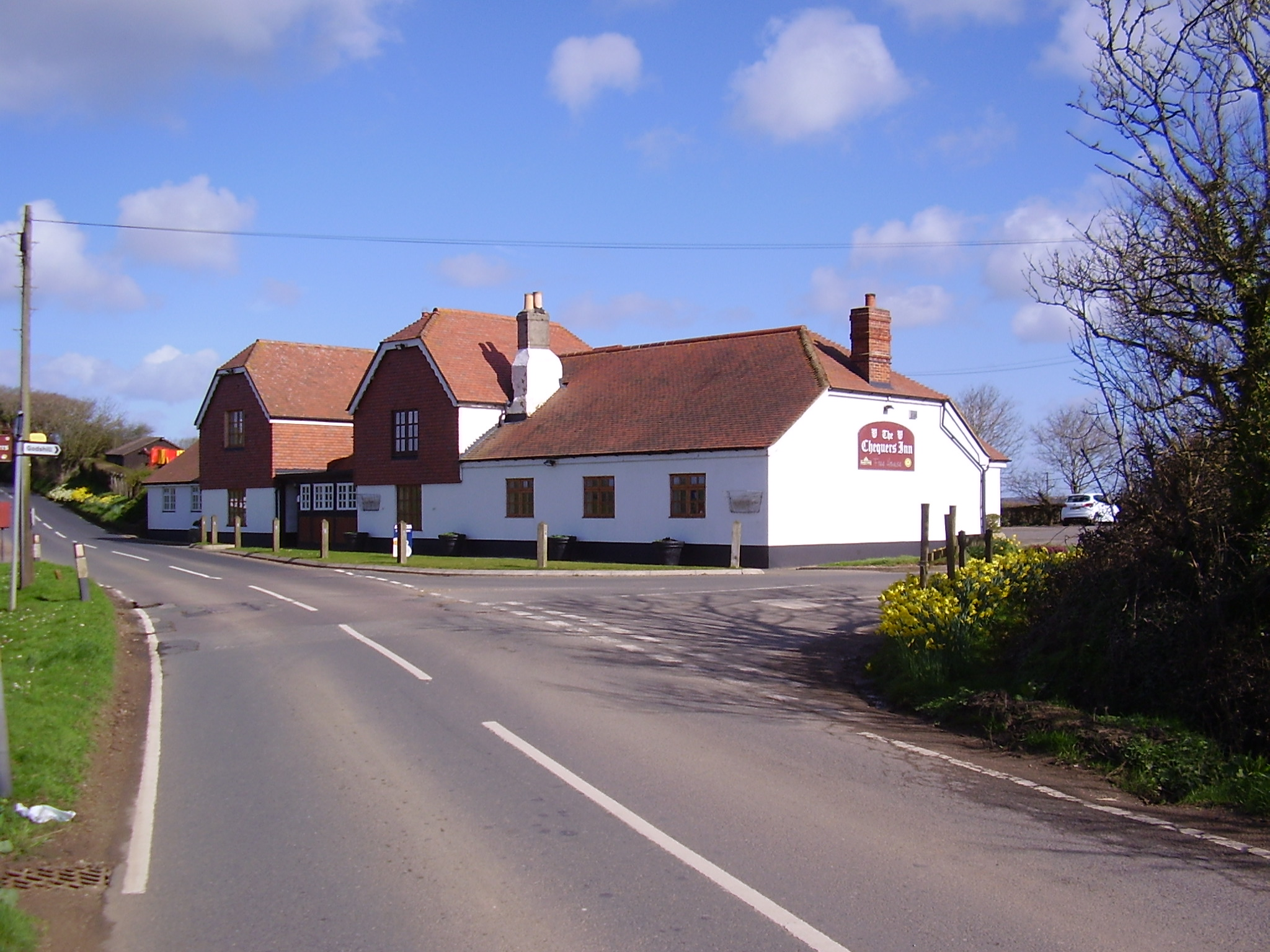
The Chequers Inn

On 26 September 1940 a Messerschmitt Bf 110, piloted by Fw Rohde and Fw Both, crashed in a field ~0.5 miles (0.80 km) south of the Chequers Inn, with both the pilots being taken as POWs.

== Demographics ==
At the 2001 census, its population was 641. At the 2011 census, its population was 638. In 2021, its population was 607. It had a 0.5% annual population change from 2011 to 2021.

Gender (2021)
| Gender | Number | Percent |
|---|---|---|
| Male | 298 | 50.3% |
| Female | 294 | 49.7% |

Age Groups (2021)
| Age | Number | Percent |
|---|---|---|
| 0-17 | 90 | 15.2% |
| 18-64 | 330 | 55.7% |
| 65+ | 172 | 29.1% |

Age Distribution (2021)
| Age | Number | Male | Female |
|---|---|---|---|
| 0-9 | 40 | 24 | 16 |
| 10-19 | 65 | 37 | 28 |
| 20-29 | 41 | 22 | 19 |
| 30-39 | 48 | 21 | 27 |
| 40-49 | 57 | 24 | 33 |
| 50-59 | 119 | 54 | 65 |
| 60-69 | 94 | 41 | 53 |
| 70-79 | 91 | 43 | 48 |
| 80+ | 37 | 17 | 20 |

Country of Birth (2021)
| Country | Number | Percent |
|---|---|---|
| U.K | 562 | 92.7% |
| E.U | 19 | 3.1% |
| Europe (other) | 9 | 1.5% |
| Middle East and Asia | 2 | 0.3% |
| Africa | 7 | 1.2% |
| Other country | 7 | 1.2% |

Ethnic Group (2021)
| Group | Number | Percent |
|---|---|---|
| White | 589 | 97% |
| Asian | 7 | 1.2% |
| Black | 3 | 0.5% |
| Mixed/multiple | 8 | 1.3% |

Religion (2021)
| Religion | Number | Percent |
|---|---|---|
| Christian | 303 | 53.5% |
| Islam | 2 | 0.4% |
| Buddhism | 1 | 0.2% |
| Other religion | 3 | 0.5% |
| No religion | 257 | 45.4% |

== Transport ==
Southern Vectis bus route 3 serves the village on its way between Newport, Ventnor, Shanklin, Sandown and Ryde, including intermediate villages and hamlets.

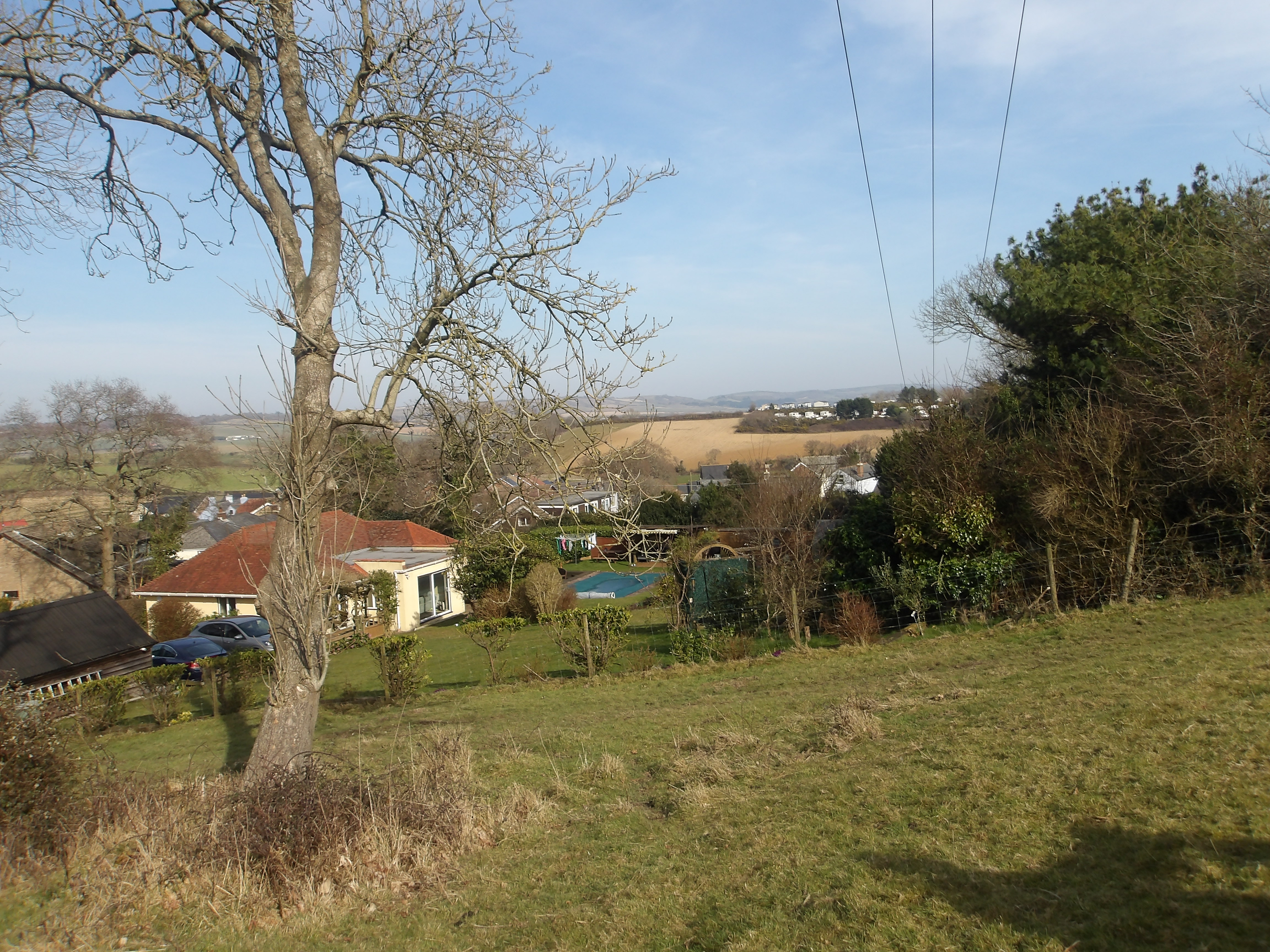
Looking out towards Bunkers Lane, Rookley

== Amenities ==
The Village Association Playing Field and Village Hall are in Highwood Lane. They are available for hire via the website. Gardening Galore is a popular event held annually.

== See also ==
- Pidford Manor
