= Froudacity =

1889 polemic by John Jacob Thomas

Froudacity: West Indian Fables by James Anthony Froude
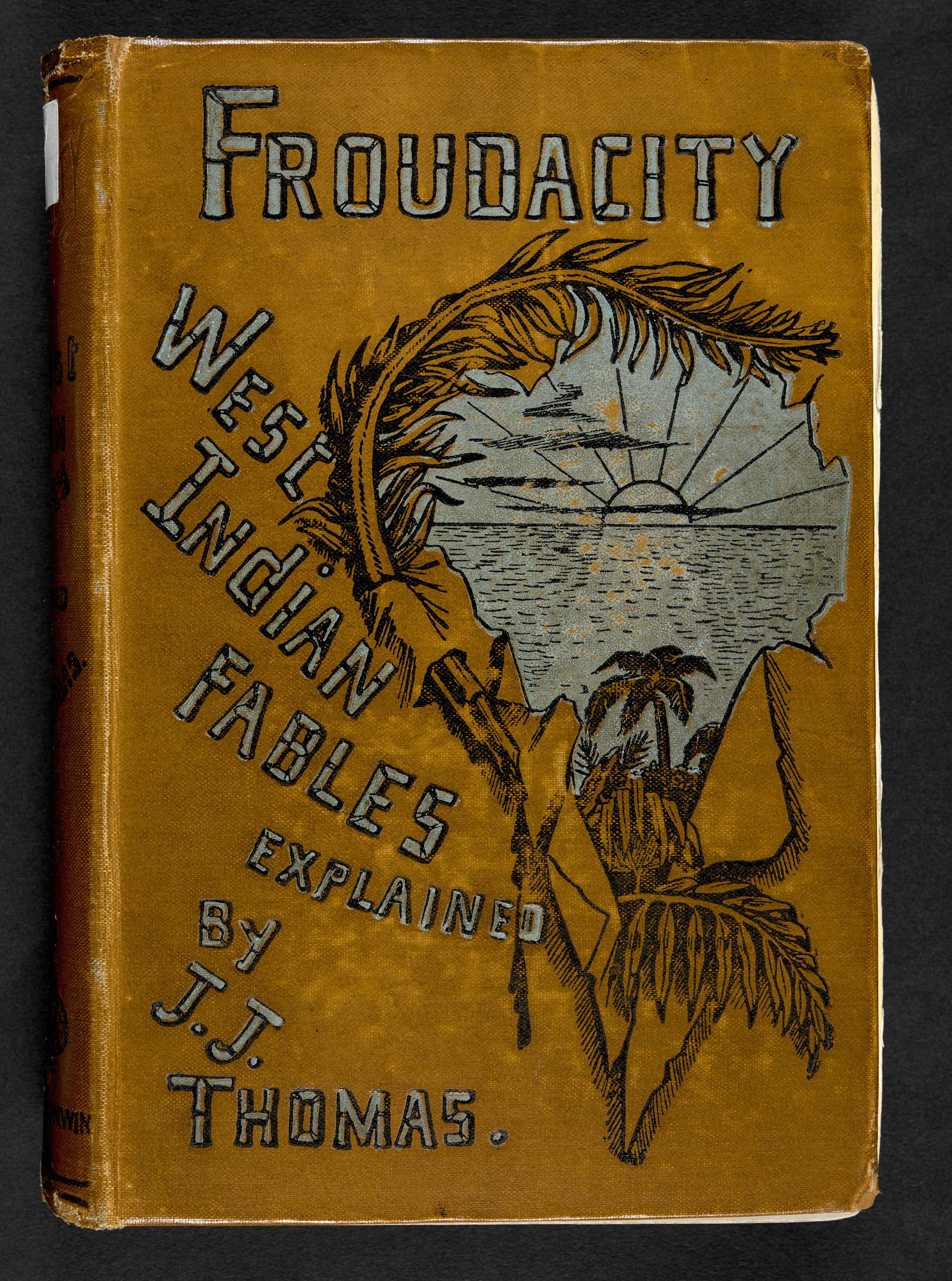
- Front cover
- Author: John Jacob Thomas
- Language: English
- Subject: Caribbean politics and history
- Publisher: T. Fisher Unwin
- Publication date: 1889
- Publication place: Trinidad
- Pages: 261 pages

Froudacity: West Indian Fables by James Anthony Froude is an 1889 polemic written by John Jacob Thomas as a rebuttal to James Anthony Froude's 1888 book The English in the West Indies. Froude's travelogue attacked the British West Indian colonies for wanting to establish self-government, arguing that if the majority black population were allowed to vote on leaders they would choose leaders that would repress the white population. Like many of his West Indian contemporaries, Thomas was outraged at the inaccuracies of Froude's text as well as the racist arguments that Froude uses as justification for his beliefs. He decided that writing a refutation to Froude was his patriotic duty and that it would act as self-vindication for West Indian blacks.

Froudacity was Thomas' last and most significant work. Thomas finished writing it shortly before succumbing to pneumonia.

== Background ==
From the middle of the 17th century to 1866, Jamaica had a self-ruling mode of government referred to as the 'Old Representative System'. However, after an outbreak of rebellion Jamaica was put under the crown colony system of government in 1866. A number of other West Indian colonies such as Trinidad and Dominica were established as crown colonies in the late 18th and early 19th century. Crown colonies had governors appointed to rule them from the Colonial Office in London. From the inception of crown colony rule, natives of crown colonies began to protest the Crown Colony form of government because they felt that the foreign-appointed governors did not hold the natives' best interests in mind. Natives of Trinidad and Jamaica repeatedly petitioned the Colonial Office to establish home rule in the colonies, but they were ignored until the early 20th century.

James Anthony Froude, a well-known English intellectual, was an apologist for imperial rule. In 1886, he published Oceana, another one of Froude's works attacking the desire for self-rule in Australia. Like English in the West Indies, it was criticized for its superficial coverage of colonial affairs and Froude's lack of exposure to the native countries which he discussed. His next travelogue, The English in the West Indies, detailed his travels in the West Indies and his political opinions on the benefits of the Crown Colony form of government. Froude argued that if the West Indian colonies were allowed home rule, the large black population in those colonies would vote for black leaders who would strip away whites' rights. Froude attacked blacks as being racially inferior, and argued that slavery was not as bad as it was commonly believed to be. Froude's work initially received good reviews in English newspapers and journals; however, it caused an outrage in the West Indian colonies.

West Indian journals and newspapers immediately denounced Froude for his racist beliefs, and the incorrect sweeping generalizations and statements that Froude makes throughout English in the West Indies. In 1888 Charles Spencer Salmon published The Caribbean Confederation and Nicholas Darnell Davis published Mr. Froude's Negrophobia or Don Quixote as a Cook's Tourist, both refuting Froude's arguments. Though both of these books were important, Thomas' response became the most renowned and was considered the finest refutation of The English in the West Indies. As a response to The English in the West Indies, "Although Salmon and Davis had responded to Froude, Thomas' response became the most celebrated.". Thomas was relatively unknown in England outside of certain intellectual circles, and being able to publish Froudacity in London was an important achievement for him.

== Synopsis ==
Froudacity is split into four books, each addressing specific topics that Froude brings. Thomas begins the preface by attacking the overarching claims that Froude uses to argue against self-governance. Thomas ridicules Froude's assertion that if blacks in West Indian countries were given the right to vote, they would elect a candidate that would strip away the rights of whites due to racial animosity. He also attacks the notion that West Indian blacks harbor animosity against whites by pointing out that as many blacks owned slaves as whites, and that most people who were alive during slavery have since died.

In Book I Thomas addresses Froude's claims in the early portions of The English in the West Indies. Froude's tendency to state incorrect assumptions as fact is roundly assaulted. Thomas criticizes Froude for making sweeping generalizations about the condition of blacks on multiple islands without ever talking or interacting with the people he was writing about. Thomas points out that Froude comments extensively on the lifestyles of the natives of Grenada when his only experience among the natives was peering into their houses as he rode past in a carriage. Thomas attacks many other different factual inaccuracies in Froude's work.

In Book II Thomas begins to directly address Froude's criticism of giving colonies self-rule. When Froude claims that leaders of the reform movements "did not complain that their affairs had been ill-managed" Thomas spends over two dozen pages detailing the gross abuses of power and corruption that many of the appointed governors of Trinidad have participated in. Thomas also debunks Froude's claim that the reformers pushed for reform in the hope that they would be elected and allowed to draw a handsome government salary. Thomas also points out that contrary to Froude's claims the reform movement has been active for decades. Thomas finishes the second book by refuting Froude's assertion that West Indian blacks were incredibly well taken care off by "the beneficent despotism of the English Government"

The 3rd book takes up half of Froudacity. It begins with Froude alleging that there are few black intellectuals. Thomas responds by accusing the West Indian governments of suppressing blacks and noting that many black intellectuals sprang up in America shortly after Emancipation because they were integrated into society. Thomas uses the examples of Frederick Douglass and Chief Justice William Conrad Reeves extensively in his arguments about race and intelligence. Both men are black and highly successful. Thomas uses these men as examples of successful black intellectuals, who succeeded despite racism. Thomas convincingly counters Froude's cheerful view of slavery. Thomas continues to contest Froude's multiple accusations about the results of black ruling over whites and what the ideal governance situation is for the West Indies. When Froude brings up the old stereotypes of blacks being lazy, or being cannibals or devil-worshipers, Thomas quickly counters all of the accusations. Thomas goes on to note the rising prominence of Christianity among blacks, and engages in a discussion on the limits of science and religion.

In the final 4th book, Thomas discusses the history of blacks instead of analyzing The English in the West Indies. Thomas discusses the history of the development slavery in America and in the West Indies. Thomas details how slave owners in the West Indies became god-parents to their slaves through the Catholic Church, and through this process developed personal relationships with slaves devoid of cruelty. The institutions of slavery developed very differently in America and the West Indies. Thomas lists the great accomplishments achieved by the "Negro Race", predicting that these accomplishments will continue growing. Thomas encourages "African descendants now dispersed in various countries of the Western Hemisphere ... at sufficient peace to begin occupying themselves about matters of racial importance".

== Reception ==
Froudacity received mostly good reviews by London newspapers, occasionally being criticized because of its style and diction. Ironically, English in the West Indies received mostly positive reviews in London newspapers when it was published as well. In the West Indies Froudacity "was launched to an ocean of publicity and pronounced a success", but "when the news reached Trinidad that he had died ... the whole country went into mourning.".

== Criticism ==
Denis Benn notes that Thomas defends against Froude's attacks on West Indian blacks and home rule reform movements, but he does not positively assert West Indian political rights. Without strongly asserting West Indian political rights, Froudacity is a refutation that does not move the readership towards the cause of the abolition of the crown colony management.

In her overview of Thomas' life and works, Bridget Brereton brings up a number of important criticisms of Froudacity. First she notes that "Thomas' essential charity and lack of prejudice led him to play down the depth of race prejudice and ill-feeling West Indian society .... Gordon Rohlehr is surely right to point out the unreality of Thomas' fairly placid picture of post-Emancipation Trinidad". She asks the pertinent question: Did Thomas intentionally lie as matter of political convenience for the Reform movement? It is impossible to judge Thomas' thoughts, but it is a reasonable explanation for why Thomas would make such an outlandish statement. Brereton continues to note that like many of his contemporaries Thomas did not believe in universal suffrage, but instead he believed that property qualifications should be necessary for voting. In the 19th century universal suffrage was not as great an issue as it grew to be, but it still shows that Thomas believed in the rule of the elite, not in true democratic rule. Finally, Brereton notes that "Thomas does not show that he understood the links between Christianity and slavery and imperialism in the Caribbean". Thomas might have understood the ties and ignored discussing them for political expediency, or as a devout Christian he might simply have dismissed the idea that religion could do harm.
