= Elizabeth Missing Sewell =

English religious writer (1815–1906)

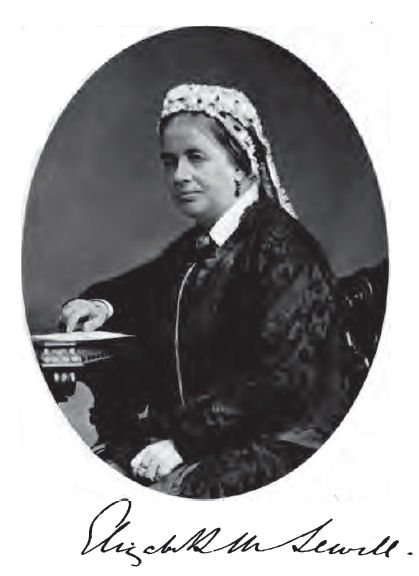
- Elizabeth Sewell
- Born: 19 February 1815; Newport, Isle of Wight, England
- Died: 17 August 1906 (aged 91); Bonchurch, Isle of Wight, England
- Occupation: Writer
- Relatives: Richard (brother); William (brother); Henry (brother); James (brother)
- Writing career
- Period: 19th century
- Genre: Children's literature

Elizabeth Missing Sewell (19 February 1815 – 17 August 1906) was an English author of religious and educational texts notable in the 19th century. As a home tutor, she devised a set of influential principles of education.

== Biography and writings ==
Elizabeth Missing Sewell was born at High Street, Newport, Isle of Wight, on 19 February 1815, as third daughter in a family of seven sons and five daughters of Thomas Sewell (1775–1842), solicitor, of Newport, and his wife Jane Edwards (1773–1848). She was sister of Henry Sewell, the first premier of New Zealand, of James Edwards Sewell, warden of New College, Oxford, of Richard Clarke Sewell, reader in law to the University of Melbourne and the author of many legal works, and of William Sewell, clergyman and author. Elizabeth was educated first at Miss Crooke's school at Newport and then at the Misses Aldridge's school, Bath. At the age of 15 she went home and joined her sister Ellen, two years her senior, in teaching her younger sisters.

About 1840 her brother William introduced her to some leaders of the Oxford Movement, including Keble, Newman and Henry Wilberforce. Influenced by the religious stir of the period, she published in 1840, in The Cottage Monthly, Stories illustrative of the Lord's Prayer, which appeared in book form in 1843. Like all her early works, the stories were marked as having been edited by her brother William.

The family experienced money difficulties through the failure of two local banks, and her father died in 1842 deep in debt. Elizabeth and the other children undertook to pay off the creditors by setting aside a sum each year from her literary earnings, until all was repaid. Until 1844 the family lived at Pidford Manor or Ventnor, but in that year Mrs Sewell and her daughters settled at Sea View, Bonchurch. Elizabeth bought the house, enlarged it in 1854, and later changed its name to Ashcliff. There she met William Adams, another High Church author of religious works.

In 1844, Elizabeth Sewell published Amy Herbert, a tale for girls, embodying Anglican views. It was many times reprinted and successful in England and in America. In 1846 came two of the three parts of Laneton Parsonage, a tale for children on practical use of a portion of the Church Catechism. She interrupted her work on this to publish Margaret Percival (1847), which at the suggestion of her brother William urged the claims of the Church of England on young people, in view of secessions to Rome at the time. The third part of Laneton Parsonage ensued in 1848.

Her mother died in 1847. In 1849 Miss Sewell journeyed to the Lake District with her Bonchurch neighbours Captain and Lady Jane Swinburne and their son Algernon, the poet, then a boy of twelve. They visited Wordsworth at Rydal Mount. In 1852 she published The Experience of Life, a novel based largely on her own observations. It has been seen as her most notable literary production.

Elizabeth Sewell had now taken on the family financial affairs. Finding that her writing earned them too little, she and her sister Ellen (1813–1905) decided to take pupils at their house in Bonchurch, Isle of Wight. They saw the venture not as a school, but as a "family home", which they conducted till 1891. They began with six girls, including their nieces. Seven was the customary number. She defined her methods of education in Principles of Education, drawn from Nature and Revelation, and applied to Female Education in the Upper Classes (1865). Good accounts of life at Ashcliff appear in Miss Whitehead's Recollections of Miss Elizabeth Sewell and her Sisters (1910) and in Mrs Hugh Fraser's A Diplomatist's Life in Many Lands (1910); both writers had been pupils. Miss Sewell defied the demands of examinations, having her pupils read widely and take an interest in the issues of the day. She herself gave lessons in general history. The holidays were often passed abroad: in 1860 she spent five months in Italy and Germany, which led to a volume entitled Impressions of Rome, Florence, and Turin (1862). She was in Germany again at the outbreak of the Franco-Prussian War. Among those she met on visits to London and Oxford were Charlotte Mary Yonge, Dean Stanley, and Robert Browning. She had made Tennyson's acquaintance in the Isle of Wight in 1857.

In 1866, convinced that middle-class girls needed a better education, she founded at Ventnor St Boniface School, which gained a building of its own and became known as St Boniface Diocesan School. Its many years of prosperity were gradually curbed by the high schools that came into being in 1872. The death of her sister Emma in 1897 caused her deep depression and her mind became gradually clouded. She died at Ashcliff, Bonchurch on 17 August 1906 and was buried in the churchyard there. A carved wooden prayer desk in her memory was put up in the church by pupils and friends. It has a tablet commemorating her and her two sisters.

According to the Dictionary of National Biography, Elizabeth Sewell's influence over young people was helped by dry humour. Despite firm Anglican convictions, she won the ear of those of other views. She was an accomplished letter writer.

Besides the works mentioned, Miss Sewell wrote seven tales published between 1847 and 1868, of which Ursula (1858) stands out, and many devotional works, such as Passing Thoughts on Religion (1860), and schoolbooks. Her Thoughts for Holy Week (1857) and Preparation for the Holy Communion (1864) were often reprinted, as late as 1907 and 1910 respectively. Her schoolbooks deal chiefly with history. Two volumes of Historical Selections (1868) were written in collaboration with the novelist Charlotte Yonge. Yonge was additionally the founding editor of The Monthly Packet, to which Sewell contributed.
