= David Williams (Oxford academic) =

British academic (1786–1860)

David Williams (15 October 1786, in Lasham, Hampshire – 22 March 1860, in New College, Oxford) was Master of Winchester College, Warden of New College, Oxford (1840–60), and Vice-Chancellor of Oxford University (1856–58).

Williams is buried in the antechapel of New College chapel.

Academic offices
Preceded by Henry Dison Gabell	Headmaster of Winchester College; 1824–1835	Succeeded by George Moberly
Academic offices
Preceded by Philip Nicholas Shuttleworth	Warden of New College, Oxford; 1840–1860	Succeeded by James Edwards Sewell
Preceded by Richard Lynch Cotton	Vice-Chancellor of Oxford University; 1856–1858	Succeeded by Francis Jeune
