= James Anthony Froude =

English historian, novelist and biographer (1818–1894)

James Anthony Froude FRSE
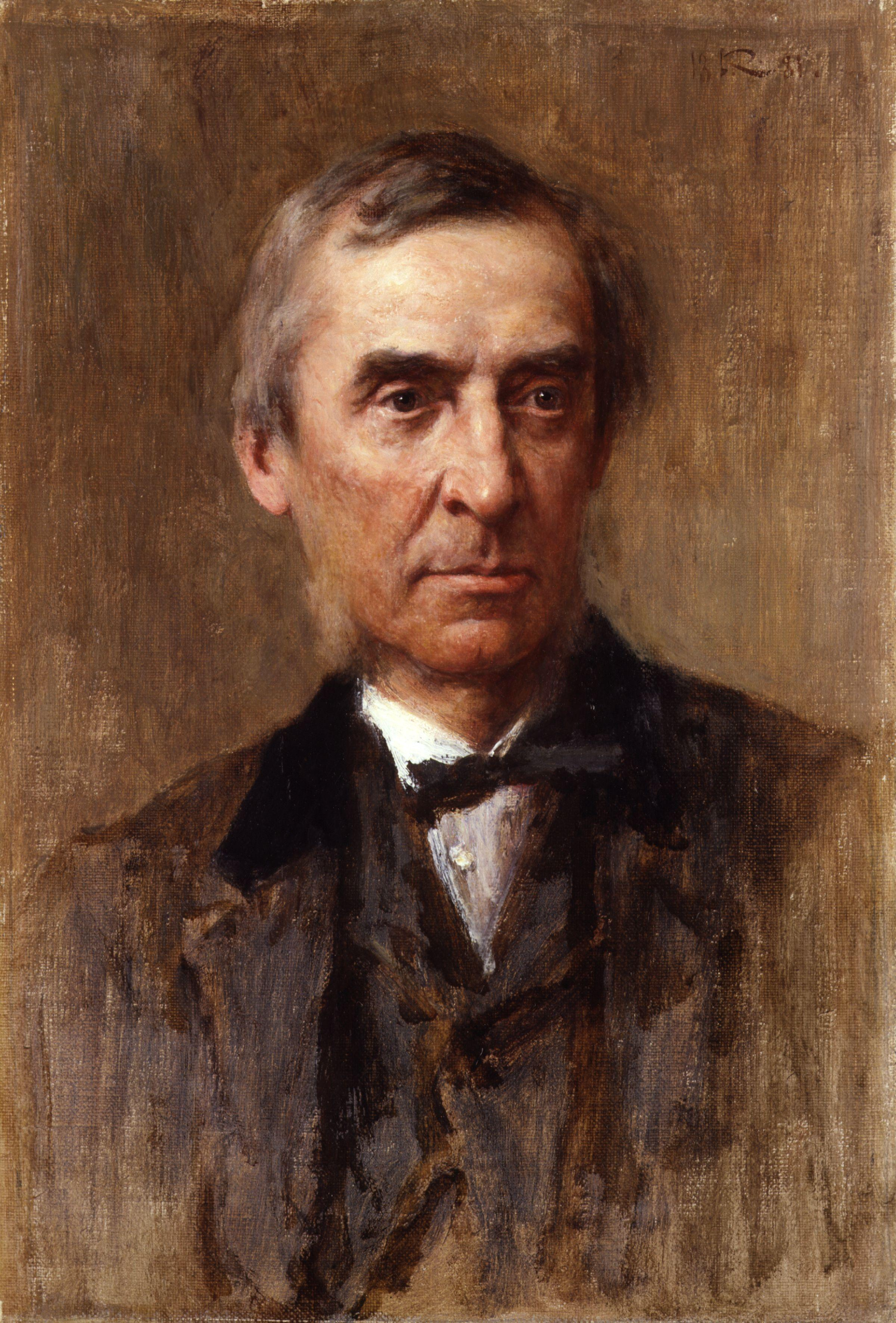
- Painting by Sir George Reid
- Born: 23 April 1818; Dartington Rectory, Devon, England
- Died: 20 October 1894 (aged 76); Woodcot, Kingsbridge, Devon, England
- Resting place: Shadycombe Cemetery, Salcombe, Devon
- Education: Oriel College, Oxford
- Occupation: Historian
- Title: Regius Professor of Modern History
- Term: 1892–1894
- Predecessor: Edward Augustus Freeman
- Successor: Frederick York Powell
- Relatives: William Froude and Hurrell Froude (brothers)

James Anthony Froude (/fruːd/ FROOD; 23 April 1818 – 20 October 1894) was an English historian, novelist, biographer, and editor of Fraser's Magazine. From his upbringing amidst the Anglo-Catholic Oxford Movement, Froude intended to become a clergyman, but doubts about the doctrines of the Anglican church, published in his scandalous 1849 novel The Nemesis of Faith, drove him to abandon his religious career. Froude turned to writing history, becoming one of the best-known historians of his time for his History of England from the Fall of Wolsey to the Defeat of the Spanish Armada.

Inspired by Thomas Carlyle, Froude's historical writings were often fiercely polemical, earning him a number of outspoken opponents. Froude continued to be controversial until his death for his Life of Carlyle, which he published along with personal writings of Thomas and Jane Welsh Carlyle. These publications led to persistent gossip and discussion of the couple's marital problems.

== Life and works ==
=== Early life and education (1818–1842) ===
He was the son of Robert Hurrell Froude, archdeacon of Totnes, and his wife Margaret Spedding (died 1821). James Anthony was born at Dartington, Devon, on 23 April 1818. He was the youngest of eight children, including engineer and naval architect William Froude and Anglo-Catholic polemicist Richard Hurrell Froude, who was fifteen years his elder. By James's third year his mother and five of his siblings had died of consumption, leaving James to what biographer Herbert Paul describes as a "loveless, cheerless boyhood" with his cold, disciplinarian father and brother Richard. He studied at Westminster School from the age of 11 until he was 15; there he was "persistently bullied and tormented". Despite his unhappiness and his failure in formal education, Froude cherished the classics and read widely in history and theology.

Beginning in 1836, he was educated at Oriel College, Oxford, then the centre of the ecclesiastical revival now called the Oxford Movement. Here Froude began to improve personally and intellectually, motivated to succeed by a brief engagement in 1839 (although this was broken off by the woman's father). He obtained a second-class degree in 1840 and travelled to Delgany, Ireland, as a private tutor. He returned to Oxford in 1842, won the Chancellor's English essay prize for an essay on political economy, and was elected a fellow of Exeter College.

=== Religious development and apostasy (1842–1849) ===
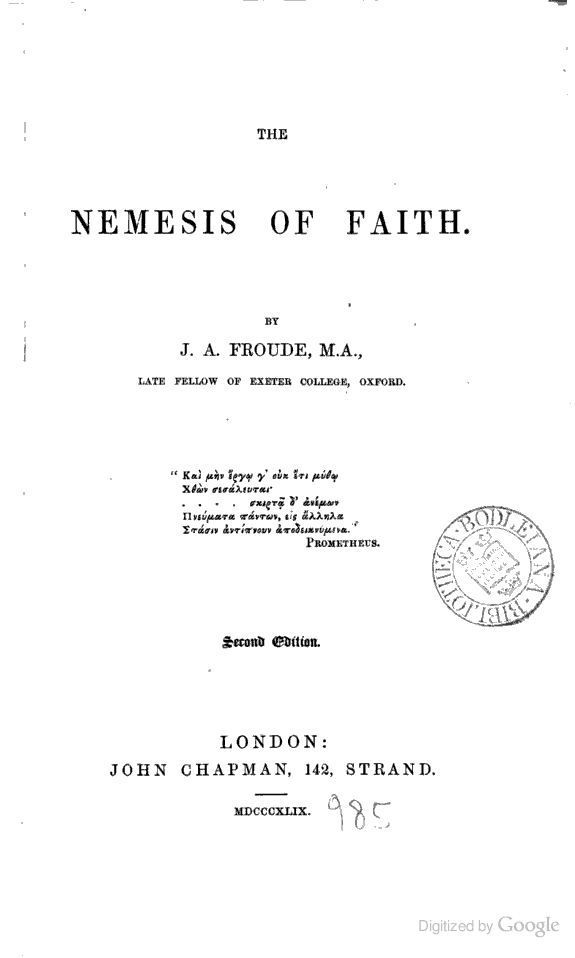
Title page of The Nemesis of Faith, second edition

Froude's brother Richard Hurrell had been one of the leaders of the Oxford Movement, a group which advocated a Catholic rather than a Protestant interpretation of the Anglican Church. Froude grew up hearing the conversation and ideas of his brother with friends John Henry Newman and John Keble, although his own reading provided him with some critical distance from the movement.

During his time at Oxford and in Ireland, Froude became increasingly dissatisfied with the Movement. Froude's experience living with an Evangelical clergyman in Ireland conflicted with the Movement's characterisation of Protestantism, and his observations of Catholic poverty repulsed him. He increasingly turned to the unorthodox religious views of writers such as Spinoza, David Friedrich Strauss, Ralph Waldo Emerson, Goethe, and especially Thomas Carlyle.

Froude retained a favourable impression of Newman, however, defending him in the controversy over Tract 90 and later in his essay "The Oxford Counter-Reformation" (1881). Froude agreed to contribute to Newman's Lives of the English Saints, choosing Saint Neot as his subject. However, he found himself unable to credit the accounts of Neot or any other saint, ultimately considering them mythical rather than historical, a discovery which further shook his religious faith.

Nevertheless, Froude was ordained deacon in 1845, initially intending to help reform the church from within. However, he soon found his situation untenable; although he never lost his faith in God or Christianity, he could no longer submit to the doctrines of the Church. He began publicly airing his religious doubts through his semi-autobiographical works Shadows of the Clouds, published in 1847 under the pseudonym "Zeta", and The Nemesis of Faith, published under his own name in 1849. The Nemesis of Faith in particular raised a storm of controversy, being publicly burned in Oxford, at Exeter College, by William Sewell, and deemed "a manual of infidelity" by the Morning Herald. Froude was forced to resign his fellowship, and officials at University College London withdrew the offer of a mastership at Hobart Town, Australia, where Froude had hoped to work while reconsidering his situation. Froude took refuge from the popular outcry by residing with his friend Charles Kingsley at Ilfracombe.

His plight won him the sympathy of kindred spirits, such as George Eliot, Elizabeth Gaskell, and later Mrs Humphry Ward. Ward's popular 1888 novel Robert Elsmere was largely inspired by this era of Froude's life.

=== History of England (1850–1870) ===
At Ilfracombe, Froude met and soon married Charlotte Grenfell, Kingsley's sister-in-law, the daughter of Pascoe Grenfell. The couple moved first to Manchester and then to North Wales in 1850, where Froude lived happily, supported by his friends Arthur Hugh Clough and Matthew Arnold. Prevented from pursuing a political career because of legal restrictions on deacons (a position which was at the time legally indelible), he decided to pursue a literary career. He began by writing reviews and historical essays, with only sporadic publications on religious topics, for Fraser's Magazine and the Westminster Review. Froude soon returned to England, living at London and Devonshire, in order to research his History of England from the Fall of Wolsey to the Defeat of the Spanish Armada, on which he worked for the next twenty years. He worked extensively with original manuscript authorities at the Record Office, Hatfield House, and the village of Simancas, Spain.

Froude's historical writing was characterised by its dramatic rather than scientific treatment of history, an approach Froude shared with Carlyle, and also by Froude's intention to defend the English Reformation (which he asserted was "the hinge on which all modern history turned"; quotes in Paul 1906, p. 72 and the "salvation of England") against the interpretations of Catholic historians. Froude focused on figures such as Henry VIII and Elizabeth I, although he became increasingly unfavourable to Elizabeth over the course of his research. Furthermore, he directly expressed both his antipathy towards Rome and his belief that the Church should be subordinated to the state. As a result, when the first volumes of Froude's history were published in 1856 they drew the ire of liberals (who felt that Froude's depiction of Henry VIII celebrated despotism) and Oxford High Churchmen (who opposed his position on the Church); this hostility was expressed in reviews from the Christian Remembrancer and the Edinburgh Review. The work was a popular success, however, and along with Froude's 1858 repudiation of his early novels helped him regain much of the esteem he had lost in 1849. Following the death of Thomas Macaulay in 1859, Froude became the most famous living historian in England.

In 1862, he was elected as a member to the American Philosophical Society.

Beginning in 1864, Edward Augustus Freeman, a High Churchman, launched a critical campaign against Froude in the Saturday Review and later in the Contemporary Review, somewhat damaging Froude's scholarly reputation. In 1879, Freeman's review in the Contemporary Review of Froude's Short Study of Thomas Becket incited Froude to respond with a refutation in The Nineteenth Century which largely discredited Freeman's attacks and reaffirmed the value of Froude's manuscript research.

In 1860, Froude's wife Charlotte died; in 1861, he married her close friend Henrietta Warre, daughter of John Warre, MP for Taunton. Also in 1861, Froude became editor of Fraser's Magazine following the death of former editor John Parker, who was also Froude's publisher. Froude retained this editorship for fourteen years, resigning it in 1874 at the request of Thomas Carlyle, with whom he was working. In 1869 Froude was elected Lord Rector of St. Andrews, defeating Benjamin Disraeli by a majority of fourteen. In 1870, following the passage of the Clerical Disabilities Act (c. 91, Vict. XXXIII & XXXIV; "Bouverie's Act"), which permitted priests and deacons to resign from Holy Orders, Froude was finally able to officially rejoin the laity.

In a prize-winning work published in 1981, the historian J. W. Burrow remarked of Froude that he was a leading promoter of the imperialist excitement of the closing years of the century, but that in the mass of his work even empire took second place to religion.

=== Looking abroad (1870–1880) ===
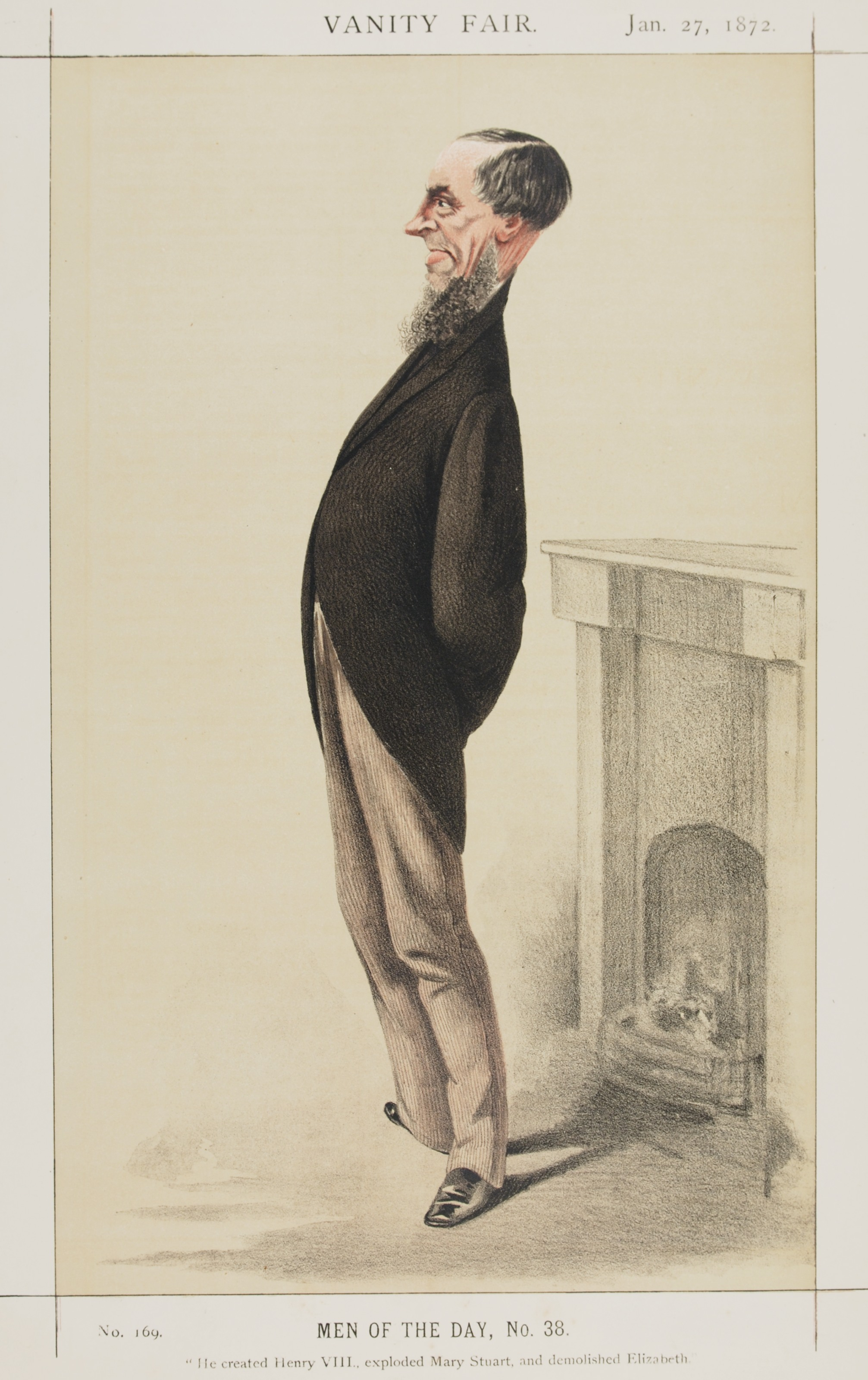
Caricature by Adriano Cecioni published in Vanity Fair in 1872

Soon after the completion of the History of England in 1870, Froude began research for a history of Ireland. As with his earlier work, English in Ireland in the Eighteenth Century was opinionated, favouring Protestantism over Catholicism and frequently attempting to justify British rule in Ireland, particularly under Oliver Cromwell (a deeply unpopular figure among Irish Catholics). Froude argued that Ireland's issues were the result of too little control from authorities in London, and that an even greater amount of British control—an "enlightened despotism"—was needed to alleviate problems that were present in Ireland.

In September 1872, Froude accepted an invitation to lecture in the United States, where his work was also well-known. At that time, many Americans (particularly Irish Americans) were opposed to British rule in Ireland, and Froude hoped to change their views. The lectures, widely discussed, raised the expected controversy, with opposition led by the Dominican friar Thomas Nicholas Burke. Opposition caused Froude to cut his trip short, and he returned to England disappointed both by his impression of America and by the results of his lectures.

In England, too, Froude's Irish history had its critics, most notably William Edward Hartpole Lecky in his History of England in the Eighteenth Century, the first volumes of which were published in 1878, and in reviews in Macmillan's Magazine.

In February 1874, shortly before completion of English in Ireland, Froude's wife Henrietta died, after which Froude moved from London to Wales. As a means of diversion, Froude travelled to the Southern African Colony of Natal, unofficially for Colonial Secretary Lord Carnarvon, to report on the best means of promoting a confederation of the colonies and states of southern Africa. This region, seen as vital for the security of the Empire, was only partially under British control. Confederating the various states under British rule was seen as the best way of peacefully establishing total imperial control and ending the autonomy of the remaining independent states.

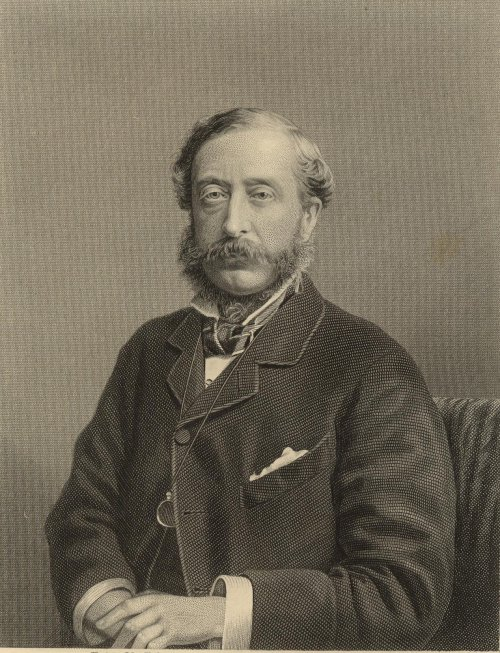
Colonial Secretary Lord Carnavon

On his second trip to Southern Africa in 1875, Froude was an imperial emissary charged with promoting confederation, a position which conflicted at times with his habit of lecturing on his personal political opinions. In the Cape Colony, his public statements advocating the use of forced labour on the indigenous Xhosa people were particularly controversial given that the Cape Colony was under the rule of the relatively inclusive Molteno-Merriman Government, whose stated policy to treat its Xhosa citizens as "fellow subjects with white men" Froude accused of being "rabid in its anti-Imperialist stance". Relations were not improved by Froude's disdain for the Cape's local politics and of the "Cape politicians [who] strut about with their Constitution as a schoolboy newly promoted to a tail coat, and ... imagine that they have the privileges of perfect independence, while we are to defend their coasts and keep troops to protect them in case of Kaffir insurrection." Overall, though, the confederation scheme as promoted by Carnavon was not popular in the Southern African states, which were still simmering from the last bout of British imperial expansion (President Brand of the Orange Free State refused outright to even consider it).

However, in his travels through different parts of southern Africa, Froude gained some support through publicly agitating for pet local causes. "Chameleon-like, his politics assumed the colour of his surroundings," was how the Cape Argus newspaper described his strategy.

Froude was acclaimed nearly everywhere he went on his speaking tour, but the support he found was not so much for the conference as for his endorsement of pet local causes. Separatists would have separation; the Cape Dutch would have redress for their cousins in the Dutch Republics over Griqualand West; and conservatives would have a strict disciplinary native policy. "Chameleon-like, his politics assumed the colour of his surroundings," said a Cape Argus editorial. Froude became more confident of the success of his mission when his Lord and Master Carnarvon decided to switch the site of the conference to Natal. That decision contained the threat–empty as it turned out because Natal and the Republics would not play ball–that the Confederation might comprise Natal, Griqualand West and one or both Dutch Republics, leaving the Cape out in the cold. These hardball tactics produced exactly the opposite of their intended effect upon the Molteno Ministry. It became more rabid in its anti-Imperialist stance. John X. Merriman, who had come to accept responsible government and had become Molteno's Commissioner of Crown Lands and Public Works, mounted slashing counter-attacks upon Froude, "the Imperial Agent." The rhetoric culminated in the famous "Bread-roll War." Suffice it to say that, with emotions running very high, it was imprudent for the Mayor of Uitenhage to invite the Imperial Agent to a luncheon in honour of the Minister of Crown Lands and Public Works. As Merriman got warmed up on the subject of Imperial agitation, guests–including Paterson–interrupted the Minister, to the annoyance of his supporters. The culmination was a bombardment of the top table with bread rolls, and fist fights among guests. Merriman's remarks may have been ill-advised and intemperate, but the incident did at least persuade Froude to stop making speeches. — Hone 1993, p. 61

The Cape Colony was by far the largest and most powerful state in the region, and Froude thus sought audience with its prime minister, John Molteno, to convey Carnarvon's request that he lead the region's states into Carnarvon's confederation scheme. However, Molteno rebuffed Froude, telling him that the confederation attempt was premature, that the country was "not ripe for it" and that his government would not support it in the politically volatile region. He made the additional point that any federation with the illiberal Boer republics would endanger the rights and franchise of the Cape's black citizens, and that overall "the proposals for confederation should emanate from the communities to be affected, and not be pressed upon them from outside."

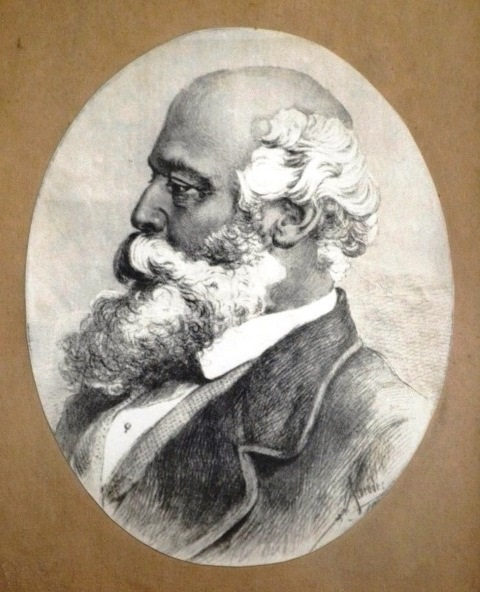
Prime Minister of the Cape, Sir John Molteno

Froude responded by openly allying with a radical white opposition party, the "Eastern Cape Separatists," promising a baronetcy to its leader Paterson if he would overthrow the Cape's elected government. In a public speech on 25 July 1876, challenging the Cape Government, he declared, "We want you to manage your natives as they do in Canada and Australia." He also promised to create a separate white Eastern Cape, and to impose a forced labour system onto the Cape's African population along "Transvaal lines" while confiscating Xhosa and Basotho land for redistribution to white farmers. Molteno, furious, condemned Froude's statements, accused Froude of imperial interference in the Cape Colony's democracy, and told the Colonial Office that he was prepared to sacrifice his job to keep the Cape out of such a confederation. Meanwhile, Merriman wrote to London accusing the "Imperial Agent" of desiring to subject and exterminate the Cape's Xhosa citizens. The Ministers of the Cape Parliament went on to accuse Carnarvon of attempting to use the Cape to oppress the region and bring upon a war with the neighbouring Xhosa and Boer states. After Merriman confronted Froude in person, at an Uitenhage event which degenerated into fist fights, Froude gave no further public speeches.

Froude's mission was thus ultimately considered unsuccessful, and caused considerable uproar in southern Africa. Nonetheless, Lord Carnarvon pushed ahead with his Confederation plan, which predictably failed and led to the confederation wars.

On his return to London, Froude announced,

If anybody had told me two years ago that I should be leading an agitation within Cape Colony, I should have thought my informant delirious. The (Cape) Ministers have the appearance of victory, but we have the substance.

Froude's observations on Africa were presented in a Report to the Secretary of State and a series of lectures for the Philosophical Society of Edinburgh, both of which were adapted into essays for inclusion in Froude's essay collection Short Studies on Great Subjects.

In 1876 he was appointed to two Royal Commissions, the first into the "Laws and Regulations relating to Home, Colonial, and International Copyright" and the second "into various matters connected with the Universities of Scotland."

In 1880, Froude published a two-part article in the North American Review where he characterized the Irish as savage and poor, which necessitated British rule over them. In the absence of British rule, Froude argues that the Irish would have perished through infighting and famine, "for except for us they would have never been alive to suffer." In response, John Lancaster Spalding wrote a rebuttal where he described Froude's article as pseudohistory and error-ridden.

=== Life of Carlyle controversy (1881–1903) ===
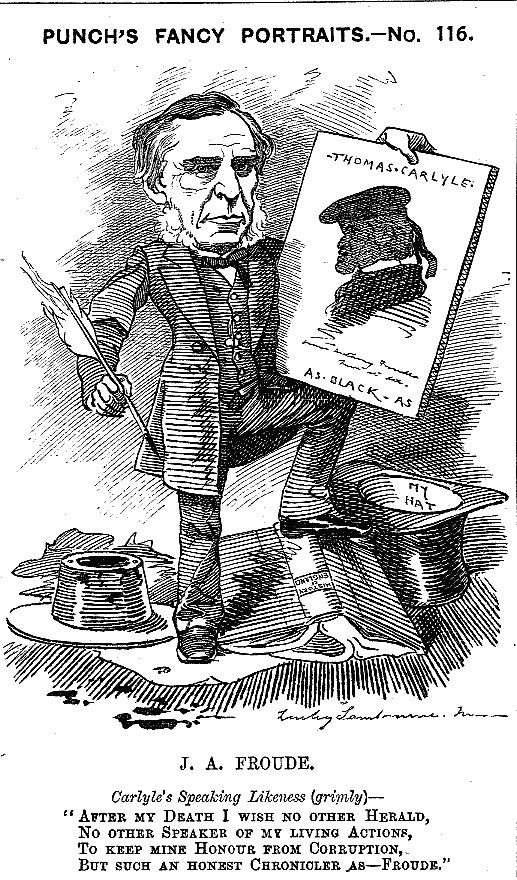
Caricature from Punch, 30 December 1882

Froude had been a close personal friend as well as an intellectual disciple of Thomas Carlyle since 1861, and the two became even closer after the death of Carlyle's wife Jane on 21 April 1866. Reading Jane's diaries and letters, Carlyle was struck by her unhappiness and his own irritability and inconsideration for her, and he decided to atone by writing her a memorial. In 1871, Carlyle gave Froude this memorial along with a bundle of Jane's personal papers, to be published after Carlyle's death, if Froude so decided. Also, Carlyle appointed Froude one of his own literary executors, although he was (perhaps intentionally) ambiguous in his instructions.

Shortly after Carlyle's death in 1881, Froude published Carlyle's Reminiscences of Jane Welsh Carlyle. Carlyle's niece, Mrs. Alexander Carlyle, presented a note written by Carlyle in 1866 stating that the volume should not be published. On the basis of this note, she accused Froude of misconduct in publishing the volume, even though the fact that Carlyle had given the volume to Froude five years later suggested that he had changed his mind. Mrs. A. Carlyle also made claims of ownership over her uncle's papers, and over the profits from their publication.

The conflict discouraged Froude from continuing his biography of Carlyle, as he wrote in 1881, "So much ill will has been shown me in the case of the other letters that I walk as if on hot ashes, and often curse the day when I undertook the business." (quoted in Paul 1906, p. 312) However, he was implored by Carlyle's brother James and sister Mrs. Austin to continue the work, and in 1882, published the first two volumes. Froude wrote his Life of Carlyle according to what he understood as Carlyle's own biographical principles, describing not only Carlyle's intellectual greatness but also his personal failings. Many readers, however, focused upon the latter, particularly Carlyle's unhappy relationship with his wife which soon became a widely used illustration in discussions of the sexual politics of marriage. Controversy was heightened by Froude's publication in 1883 of the Letters and Memorials of Jane Welsh Carlyle, Jane's own writings, and the completion of the Life of Carlyle in 1884. Among the strongest critics of Froude's biographical work was novelist Margaret Oliphant, who wrote in the Contemporary Review of 1883 that biography ought to be the "art of moral portrait painting" and described the publication of Jane Carlyle's papers as the "betrayal and exposure of the secret of a woman’s weakness." (quoted in Heidt 2006, pp. 31–32) After Froude finished his work, ownership of the manuscript material was passed to Mrs. Alexander Carlyle, who quickly authorised alternative biographical volumes by Charles Eliot Norton that excised the offensive material.

The controversy persisted for so long that in 1903, nearly ten years after Froude's death, his daughters decided to publish My Relations with Carlyle, which their father had written in 1887; in this pamphlet Froude attempted to justify his decisions as biographer, yet went further than his official biography had by speculating, based on "gossip and rumor" circulated by Geraldine Jewsbury, that Carlyle's marriage was unconsummated due to impotence. This was disputed by James Crichton-Browne, who published "Froude and Carlyle: The Imputation Considered Medically" (1903) in The British Medical Journal, which gave Jewsbury's unreliability, Jane's unfitness to bear children, and the virility of Carlyle's writings as arguments against Froude. Crichton-Browne later corroborated that after one of Jane's illnesses, her personal doctor Richard Quain sent word to Carlyle that he could "resume marital relations with his wife." Aileen Christianson, citing the correspondence of both Carlyles, states: "It seems probable that they did have a sexual relationship, however curtailed in later marriage by illness and inclination, and that the later controversies over Thomas's 'impotence' or Jane's 'frigidity' were more to do with the posturing of the defenders of each side in the marriage than with the truth."

=== Froudacity ===
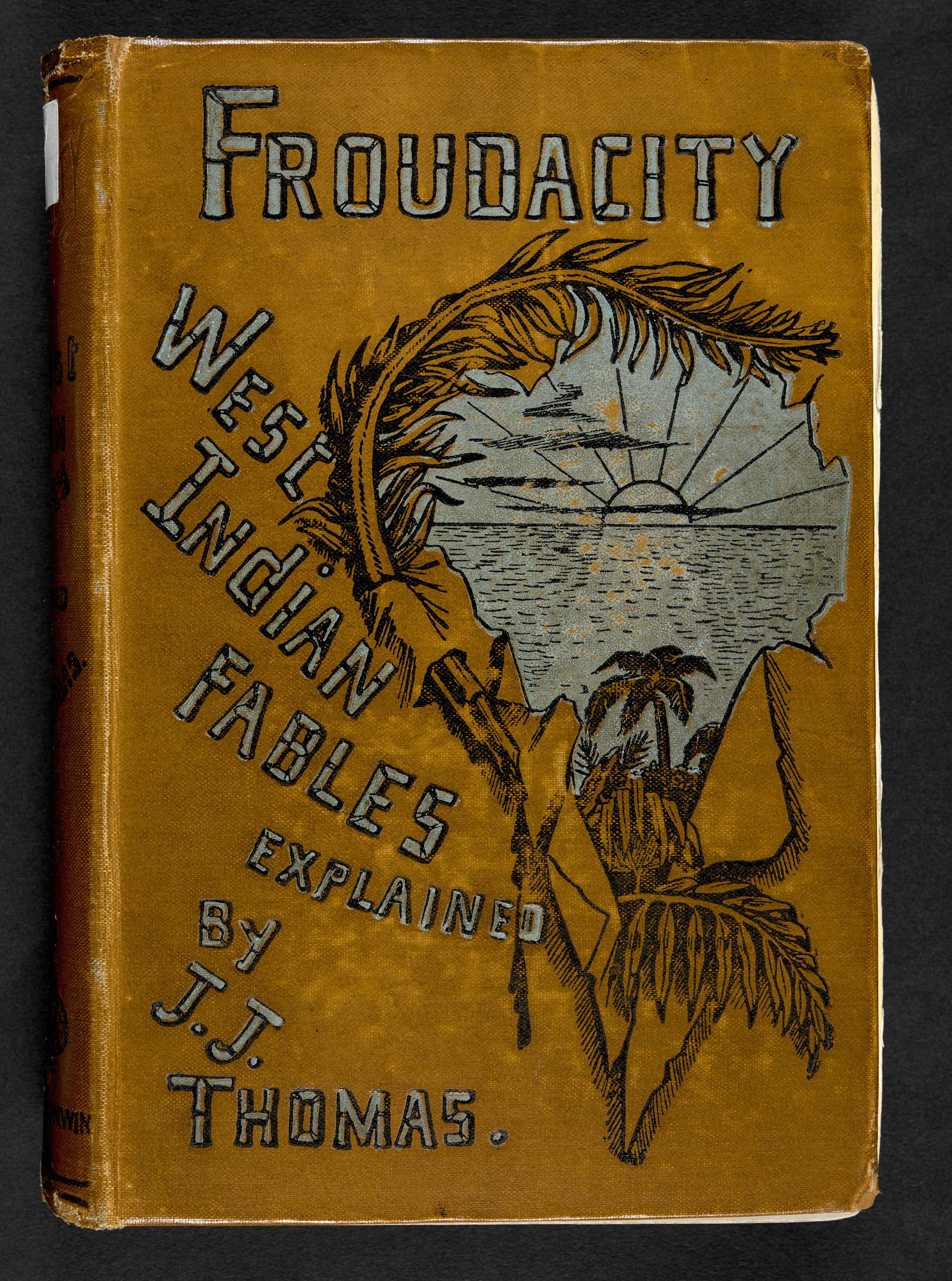
Front cover of Froudacity (1889)

Following completion of the Life of Carlyle, Froude turned to travel, particularly to the British colonies, visiting South Africa, Australia, New Zealand, the United States, and the West Indies. From these travels he produced two books, Oceana, or, England and Her Colonies (1886) and The English in the West Indies, or The Bow of Ulysses (1888), which mixed personal anecdotes with Froude's thoughts on the British Empire. Froude intended with these writings "to kindle in the public mind at home that imaginative enthusiasm for the Colonial idea of which his own heart was full". However, these books caused great controversy, stimulating rebuttals and the coining of the term Froudacity by Afro-Trinidadian intellectual John Jacob Thomas, who used it as the title of, Froudacity. West Indian fables by J. A. Froude explained by J. J. Thomas, his book-length critique of The English in the West Indies.

=== Later life (1885–1894) ===
During this time Froude also wrote a historical novel, The Two Chiefs of Dunboy, which was the least popular of his mature works. As with his earlier book on Irish history, Froude used the book to turn an Irish hero into a villain with historical distortion. On the death of his adversary Edward Augustus Freeman in 1892, Froude was appointed, on the recommendation of Lord Salisbury, to succeed him as Regius Professor of Modern History at Oxford. The choice was controversial, for Froude's predecessors had been among his harshest critics, and his works were generally considered literary works rather than books of serious history suited for academia. Nevertheless, his lectures were very popular, largely because of the depth and variety of Froude's experience and he soon became a Fellow of Oriel. Froude lectured mainly on the English Reformation, "English Sea-Men in the Sixteenth Century", and Erasmus.

The demanding lecture schedule was too much for the ageing Froude. In 1894 he retired to Woodcot in Kingsbridge, Devonshire. He died on 20 October 1894 and is buried in Salcombe Cemetery.

== Family ==
Froude was married twice: first in 1849 to Charlotte Maria Grenfell (d.1860), and upon her death, in 1861 to Henrietta Elizabeth Wade (d.1874). He was survived by one daughter (Margaret) of his first wife Charlotte Maria, née Grenfell, and by a son (Ashley Anthony Froude, C.M.G.) and a daughter (May) of his second wife Henrietta Elizabeth, née Warre.

Ashley Anthony Froude was born in 1863 at Paddington, London, England. He married Ethel Aubrey Hallifax, daughter of Albert Praed Hallifax and Isabella Aubrey Coker, in 1897 at Chelsea, London, England. He died on 17 April 1949. He was appointed Companion, Order of St. Michael and St. George (C.M.G.) and held the office of Justice of the Peace (J.P.). His son, John Aubrey Froude (b. 1898, d. 22 September 1914), died when H.M.S. Cressy on which he was serving was torpedoed by U.9.

== Works ==
=== Fiction ===
- Shadows of the Clouds. London: J. Ollivier. 1847.
- The Nemesis of Faith. New York: D. M. Bennett. 1879. download
- The Two Chiefs of Dunboy. New York: C. Scribnerʹs Sons. 1889.

=== Non-fiction ===
- History of England from the Fall of Wolsey to the Death of Elizabeth. Vol. in 12 volumes. C. Scribner and company. 1856–1870. Vol 1 Vol 2; Vol 3
  - Revised as History of England from the Fall of Wolsey to the Defeat of the Spanish Armada, in 12 volumes (1893)
- Short Studies on Great Subjects. 1867–1882.
  - The Oxford Counter-Reformation (1881)
- The English in Ireland in the Eighteenth Century. Scribner, Armstrong. 1873. p. 445.
- Caesar: A Sketch. 1879. (biography of Julius Caesar)
- Bunyan. 1880. (Biography of John Bunyan)
- Froude, James Anthony, ed. (April 1881). "Review of Reminiscences by Thomas Carlyle". The Quarterly Journal. 151: 385–428. hdl:2027/uc1.c031996020.
- Thomas Carlyle. New York, C. Scribner's sons. 1882.
- "Review of Thomas Carlyle: a History of the First Forty Years of his Life, 1795–1835 by J. A. Froude, 1882 and Thomas Carlyle: a History of his Life in London, 1834–1881 by J. A. Froude, 1884". The Quarterly Review. 159: 76–112. January 1885. Volume 1 Volume 2
- Luther: A Short Biography. 1884. (biography of Martin Luther)
- Historical Essays. 1886.
- Oceana, or, England and Her Colonies. 1886.
- The English in the West Indies or The Bow of Ulysses. Longmans, Green, and Co. 1888.
- Lord Beaconsfield. 1890. (Biography of Benjamin Disraeli)
- The Earl of Beaconsfield. 1914 [1890].
- The Divorce of Catherine of Aragon. New York, C. Scribner's sons. 1891.
- Life and Letters of Erasmus. New York Scribner. 1894.
- English Sea-Men in the Sixteenth Century. 1895.
- My Relations with Carlyle (published 1903). 1887.

=== Translations ===
- Johann Wolfgang von Goethe – Elective Affinities (Die Wahlverwandtschaften) (1854, published anonymously)

Academic offices
Preceded by John Stuart Mill	Rector of the University of St Andrews; 1868–1871	Succeeded by Charles Neaves
Preceded by Edward Augustus Freeman	Regius Professor of Modern History at Oxford; 1892–1894	Succeeded by Frederick York Powell
