= Robert Elsmere =

1888 novel by Mary Augusta Ward

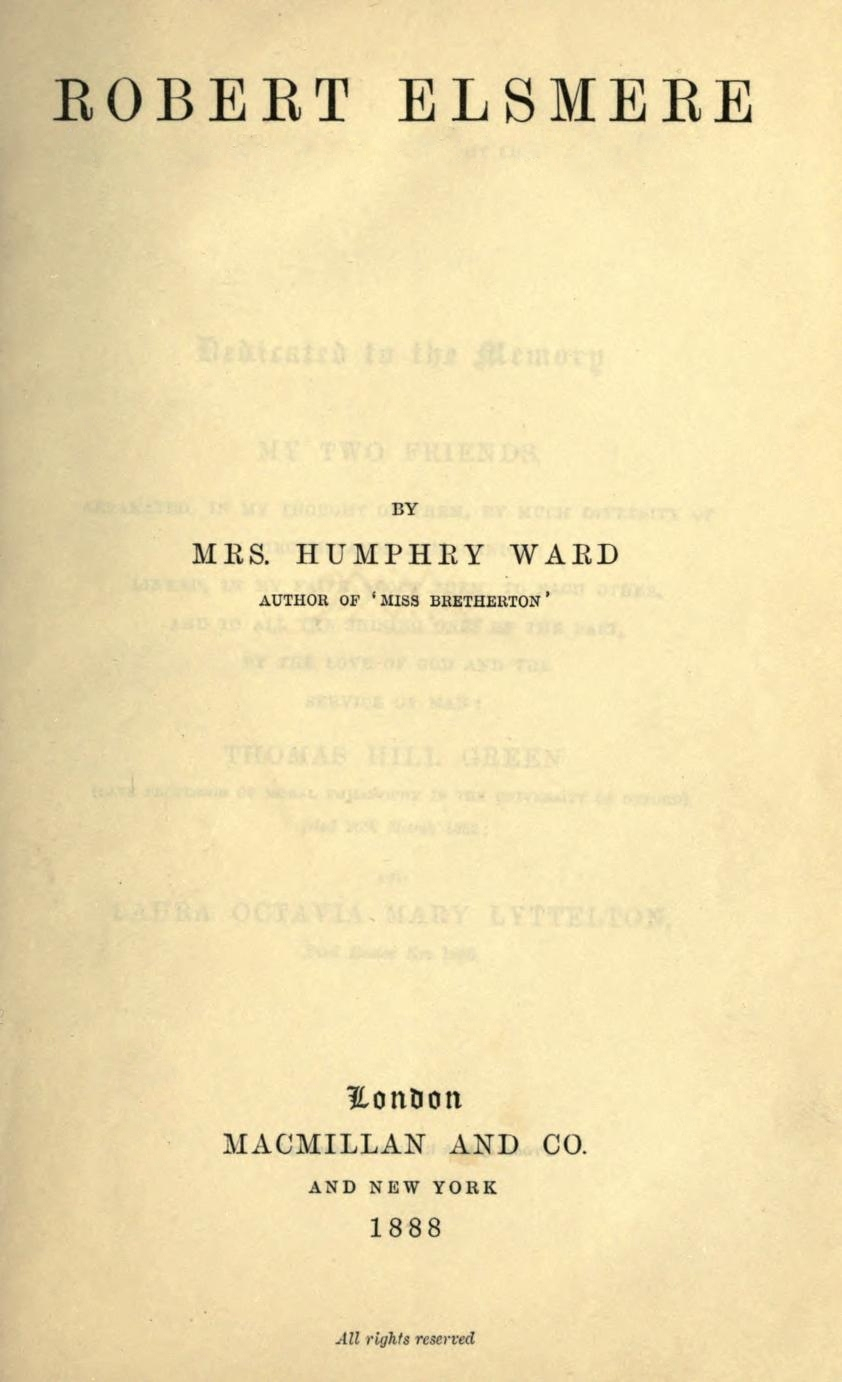
- Title page from the American or Colonial Edition.
- Author: Mary Augusta Ward
- Language: English
- Publisher: Smith, Elder
- Publication date: 1888
- Publication place: England
- Pages: 604

Robert Elsmere is a novel by Mrs. Humphry Ward published in 1888. It was immediately successful, quickly selling over a million copies and gaining the admiration of Henry James.

== Background ==
Inspired by the religious crises of early Victorian clergymen such as her father Tom Arnold, Arthur Hugh Clough, and James Anthony Froude (particularly as expressed in the last's novel The Nemesis of Faith), it is about an Oxford clergyman who begins to doubt the doctrines of the Anglican Church after encountering the writings of German rationalists like Schelling and David Strauss. Instead of succumbing to atheism or Roman Catholicism, however, Elsmere takes up a "constructive liberalism" (which Ward received from Thomas Hill Green) stressing social work amongst the poor and uneducated. Ward was inspired to write Robert Elsmere after hearing a sermon by John Wordsworth in which he argued that religious unsettlement, such as that experienced in England throughout the nineteenth century, leads to sin; Ward decided to respond by creating a sympathetic, loosely fictionalized account of the people involved in this unsettlement at the present, including her friends Benjamin Jowett, Mark Pattison, and her uncle Matthew Arnold.

The novel was the subject of a famous review by William Ewart Gladstone in which he criticized the novel's advocacy of the "dissociation of the moral judgment from a special series of religious formulae." In a more jocular manner, Oscar Wilde in his essay "The Decay of Lying" famously quipped that Robert Elsmere was "simply Arnold's Literature and Dogma with the literature left out."

The novel was a runaway best-seller, but it might have suffered the same fate as other Victorian era novels dealing with crises of faith had it not been for Ward's sensitive treatment of the subject. It was revolutionary in the nineteenth century when readers were acutely sensitive to anything they saw as blasphemy, and the presence of Jesus Christ in any but serious scholarly and devotional books was taboo. Then Lew Wallace included him in his novel Ben-Hur less than a decade before Ward published Robert Elsmere. This broke new ground but it was successful only because Wallace portrayed him as the Saviour. Had Wallace followed his original purpose to portray Jesus as a mere man, he might have undergone the attacks that were then launched at Ward.

Robert Elsmere generated enormous interest from intellectuals and agnostics who saw it as a liberating tool for liberating times and from those of faith who saw it as another step in the advancement of apostasy or heathenism. As with many other best-sellers, though, it was repeatedly copied and sales of the unauthorized editions matched or surpassed those of the authorized.

The book was out of print for twenty-five years, but was republished as a scholarly edition in 2013 which includes extracts from Gladstone's review.

== Setting ==
Much of the novel is set in and around Longsleddale in the Lake District, called by Ward ‘Long Whindale’.

Thus for example the haunted ‘High Fell’ of the book is in fact High Street.

== Dramatization ==
Plans were immediately underway to dramatize the work at the Madison Square Theatre on Broadway in New York City. Actor/playwright William Gillette, who would later be renowned for playing Sherlock Holmes, was given the task of doing it. He read the novel to determine, as he put it, "whether or not there existed sufficient dramatic material in the book for stage purposes. Upon deciding that, with some modification, an effective drama could be constructed upon the motive found in it, I so notified those managers, and at the same time wrote at length to the author requesting her permission to make sure of the material, and offering therefore a liberal royalty." He assured Mrs. Ward that the material would be "seriously and delicately treated" and would be free from theological discussion of any description. He also assured her that he strongly wished to break down barriers of unreasonable prejudice opposed to works dealing with religious belief, "for those who consider the stage as a mere place of amusement and buffoonery are as hopelessly narrow and bigoted as the people who still hold it to be an agency of the devil."

He had also assured her that, should she give her consent and then withdraw it, her wishes would be honored in full. Then he warned her of a fate similar to what befell Uncle Tom's Cabin not four decades earlier, when pirated copies were printed and sold overseas with no payment to the author, and dramatizations were written and staged throughout America, many of them reshaping the story according to the prejudices of those dramatizing it, which worked to the detriment of the original work: "Should Mrs. Ward, upon receiving it, still refuse us her authorization, the piece will not be done under our management. Instead, there will be presented to the public a number of cheap and careless adaptations, hurried upon the stage by irresponsible parties, just as there have been issued and put on sale hundreds of thousands of cheap, ill-printed, and unauthorized copies of the book. We shall then be treated to a burst of horrified indignation against the theater from the righteous people who have been partakers in literary theft by buying and reading these unauthorized and un-paid-for publications."

Another problem, Gillette declared, was that "the literary state of affairs between England and America – at least so far as dramatic work is concerned – is not one of peaceful trade; it is nearer to absolute warfare. Our work is taken by the English, and adapted, changed, rechristened, and performed without even the courtesy of asking permission. Anything in the way of reprisal is certainly excusable, provided one is inclined to that sort of work. I do not particularly care for it."

Gillette reported that "upon Mrs. Ward's final refusal of her permission to dramatize 'Robert Elsmere' I abandoned the work. It was completed, rehearsed, and put upon the stage by other parties, and under other management."

Producer Charles Frohman then announced that what Gillette had refused to do would be done by somebody else, "and the piece, which has already been booked through the country, will be presented, a production being made in this city as soon as arrangements can be made."

It was announced on March 18 that the dramatization and the casting were complete and rehearsals were underway. The play opened at the Hollis Street Theatre in Boston on April 8 to pretty good reviews, the Boston Globe mentioning that "the playwrights have done their work deftly..."

David Belasco then produced Robert Elsmere at the Union Square Theatre in New York on April 29, 1889. It ran for two nights before being withdrawn due to lack of support. Its main problem was that it dealt with harsh realities and deep and controversial situations that theater audiences were not yet ready for. "Most middle class men of the late nineteenth century did not see life either in social or economic or in modern psychological terms," Catherine Marks explained. "They regarded dramatic conflict as a battle between the individual and visible external forces or between the individual and his conscience. There was no doubt about what was 'Right.' Cracks were beginning to appear and the European dramatists, Henrik Ibsen and George Bernard Shaw, were attracting some attention by the 1890s. But very few American theatre-goers were interested in social problems or subjective depth-probing."
