= John Jacob Thomas =

John Jacob Thomas, who published as J. J. Thomas (1841–1889) was a Trinidadian linguist and writer. He wrote a grammar of Trinidadian French Creole (1869), but is best known for Froudacity (1889), a rebuttal of J. A. Froude's 1888 book The English in the West Indies.

== Early life ==
John Jacob Thomas was born into poverty in South Trinidad in the year 1841 — a couple of years after the Enslaved African period was over in the British West Indies. As a child, he grew up around those who knew what servitude was like and who longed for freedom. His early years are touched upon in his most famous book, Froudacity, where he states that he had been "familiar since childhood with members from every tribe in Africa". From 1858 to 1860, Thomas was enrolled as a student in Woodbrook, Port of Spain, Trinidad and Tobago. In early 1860, he received his first job as a teacher and worked for five years teaching children in the towns of Couva and Savonetta in Trinidad and Tobago. In 1869, his book The Theory and Practice of Creole Grammar, was published. He was no longer a teacher but he continued developing knowledge, engaging in debates, and contacting the Press with his opinions.

== Biography ==
John Jacob Thomas was born around 1841 in San Fernando, Trinidad. He was noted for intelligence from an early age, going to one of the first primary schools in 1851 where he was selected for special training to become one of the first qualified teachers in 1858. He gained an allowance of £20–£40 a year to render teaching services while he was still at the training school. He was awarded a place in the "Model School", the teachers’ training school.

Thomas was appointed as the schoolmaster at Savonetta in 1860. Thomas published a book called The Theory and Practice of Creole Grammar after needing to learn Patois, the language spoken in Savonetta, since the overwhelming majority were illiterate agricultural workers and their families.

In 1866 Thomas was appointed to the office of the Receiver-General and sent to Cedros as a Clerk of the Peace. It was around this time that Thomas met the world-famous writer Charles Kingsley. Kingsley was impressed with Thomas and chose him as secretary to the Education Board and for the council of Queen’s Collegiate School.

Thomas’s greatest accomplishment came in 1889, when James Anthony Froude published an attack on the black population of the West Indies in his book The English in the West Indies, or The Bow of Ulysses. Thomas attacked Froude’s odious opinions in his own published book entitled Froudacity. It attracted international attention and Thomas became established as an author of scholarship and ability.

Thomas was forced to retire from the civil service in 1879 due to being diagnosed with rheumatism of the eye and poor health in general. During his time confined to a bed he translated Gustave Borde’s book History of Trinidad Under the Spanish Government from French into English, but the translation was never published. Froude recovered in 1883 and assumed the headmastership of the San Fernando Borough High School. His position did not last long, however, in 1888 he went to England for his failing health and to publish new editions of his two books, Froudacity and Creole Grammar. He died in England in 1889, at 49 years of age.

== Impact ==
According to Cedric Robinson, Thomas had a discernible impact on the evolution of Trinidad's Black intelligentsia. His work made possible the approaches to Trinidadian radical traditions that was crystallized in the lives of figures like C.L.R. James, Claudia Jones, and Eric Williams, among others.
