= The Nemesis of Faith =

Book by James Anthony Froude

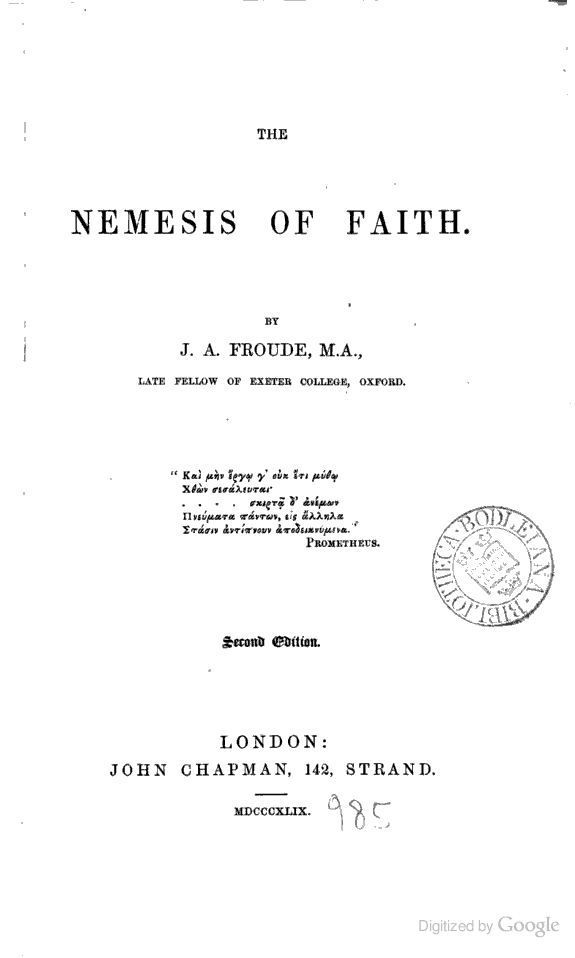
- Title Page, 2nd Ed.
- Author: James Anthony Froude
- Language: English
- Genre: Philosophical novel
- Publisher: John Chapman
- Publication date: 1849
- Publication place: England
- Pages: 227

The Nemesis of Faith is an epistolary philosophical novel by James Anthony Froude published in 1849. Partly autobiographical, the novel depicts the causes and consequences of a young priest's crisis of faith. Like many of his contemporaries, Froude came to question his Christian faith in light of early nineteenth century developments in history, theology, and science. Froude was particularly influenced by the Catholic teachings of the Oxford Movement and by the new approach to religious scholarship developed by the German Higher Critics.

The novel consists primarily of protagonist Markham Sutherland's account of the development of his religious ideas and doubts, followed by a brief narrative in which Sutherland's lack of faith leads him and his lover to tragic ends. The novel was condemned by English religious figures and publicly burned by William Sewell; this led to Froude's resignation of his fellowship at Oxford University. The novel's reception amongst literary reviewers was mixed; while writers such as George Eliot professed profound admiration, others such as Thomas Carlyle were harshly critical. Although no longer widely read as a literary work, it remains significant in intellectual history for its accounts of Victorian scepticism and the Oxford Movement.

== Plot summary ==
The story of Markham Sutherland is presented through various letters, journals, and the third-person account of the novel's supposed editor, Arthur. Sutherland, under pressure from his father to become a clergyman, confesses to Arthur his reservations about accepting the Thirty-Nine Articles and contemporary English Christianity in general. In particular, Sutherland is concerned about the depiction of God in the Old Testament, God's patronage of the Israelites on non-moral grounds, the doctrine of Eternal Punishment, and the supposed inerrancy of the Bible. Sutherland was profoundly influenced by John Henry Newman in his early years, but was ultimately unable to accept Newman's doctrines. Sutherland also seeks guidance in the writings of Victorian historian and sage Thomas Carlyle (who was Froude's chief intellectual influence in later years), but finds no solutions. Tormented by his doubts and subsequent alienation from his family, Sutherland becomes morbidly depressed.

On Arthur's advice, Sutherland takes orders, hoping that his doubts will eventually pass when he enters a more active life. Because of the selectivity of his sermons, however, his parishioners begin to suspect him of Socinianism. When Sutherland is tricked into making a harsh criticism of the British and Foreign Bible Society, claiming that the text of the Bible without clerical guidance is more likely to lead to wickedness than to Christian faith and virtue, his doubts are revealed, and he is forced to resign his position.

Sutherland travels to Como to rest and recover from illness, indulging in free religious speculation while there. He befriends Helen Leonard, who sympathises with his troubles and listens to his doubts. Helen's dull, unloving husband prefers to spend time away from his wife, and leaves her in Sutherland's company for the season. Helen and Sutherland fall in love, causing both great anxiety, although the relationship never becomes physical. The two consider eloping, but Helen decides she cannot leave her daughter, Annie. During this conversation, however, the unsupervised Annie dips her arm into the lake, causing her to fall ill and die soon after. Sutherland again becomes depressed, believing that his religious speculations have brought himself and Helen into sin. He plans suicide, but is stopped at the last moment by an old friend, representative of John Henry Newman. Sutherland retires to a monastery, although his repentance is short lived, and he dies still in doubt. Helen, meanwhile, separates from her husband and retires to a convent, although she is unreconciled with the Church because she maintains that her love for Sutherland is holier than her marriage.

== Major themes ==
The novel's primary interest comes from its depiction of Sutherland's religious doubts, which arise from the weakness of a faith based on empirically false historical claims, "old-wives' tales" taken for truth. Instead, Sutherland aims to follow "not the Christian religion, but the religion of Christ," spirituality without dogma. However, Froude was not fully satisfied with this formulation, and the Sutherland–Helen plot illustrates the idea that religious speculation and infidelity inevitably lead to immorality.

== Reception ==
The Nemesis of Faith raised a scandal at its first release, being referred to as "a manual of infidelity" in the Morning Herald. It was publicly burned by William Sewell in his class at Exeter College. Soon after, Froude resigned his fellowship at Oxford.

The Nemesis of Faith also drew criticism on literary grounds as being melodramatic and sentimental. Froude himself wrote to his friend Charles Kingsley that "I cut a hole in my heart and wrote with the blood". Thomas Carlyle complained of the novel "Froude ought to consume his own smoke and not trouble other people's nostrils." Although recent critics tend to be more positive about the novel's depiction of Sutherland's speculative crisis, they have maintained the weakness of the ending, attributing it to Froude's inability to come to terms with his own doubts.

By contrast, the novel was positively reviewed by such literary figures as George Eliot and Mrs. Humphrey Ward, whose 1888 novel Robert Elsmere was significantly influenced by the novel and by Froude's life. In a review in the Coventry Herald Eliot wrote that in reading The Nemesis of Faith "we seem to be in companionship with a spirit who is transfusing himself into our souls, and so vitalising them by his superior energy, that life, both outward and inward, presents itself to us in higher relief, in colours brightened and deepened."

In an effort to reconcile with Oxford, Froude refused to allow republication of The Nemesis of Faith following its second edition, and in 1858 he formally repudiated the novel.

== Historical context and allusions ==
The 1840s were a turbulent decade in the Church of England. Following the earlier German Higher Critics, who argued for a historical approach to religious texts, David Strauss published Leben Jesu or The Life of Jesus, Critically Examined which argued that the events of the New Testament were not historical but rather mythical. In 1846 George Eliot published an English translation of Leben Jesu which became a source of religious doubts for Froude and many of his contemporaries. Critics have also identified Thomas Carlyle's 1836 novel Sartor Resartus and Spinoza as sources of Sutherland's doubts, and those of many of his contemporaries.

Meanwhile, the Oxford Movement, headed by John Henry Newman as well as Froude's brother Richard Hurrell Froude, was attacking the Church's move towards liberalism and secularism, advocating instead a greater emphasis on Catholic doctrine. The Movement provided a serious challenge to Protestant beliefs, with Newman later converting to Roman Catholicism. Although Froude was devoted to Newman for several years, and maintained a sentimental affection for the man (which he expressed in his essays on Newman and the Oxford Movement), he ultimately repudiated his beliefs.

The novel was influenced by Goethe's 1809 novel Elective Affinities, which Froude later translated and published anonymously. Froude borrowed much of his novel's ending from Goethe, and also used the scientific metaphor underlying Goethe's novel to illustrate the relation of an individual to the church.

== See also ==
- Apostasy
