= Pidford Manor =

Manor house on the Isle of Wight, England

Coordinates: 50.6595°N 1.2886°W

Pidford Manor is a manor house in Rookley, on the Isle of Wight, England. It is a five-bay Georgian style seven bedroom home. The house consisting of over 7,000 square foot over 3 floors and a cellar, set in 11 acres (4.5 ha), accessed from the A3020 roadway.

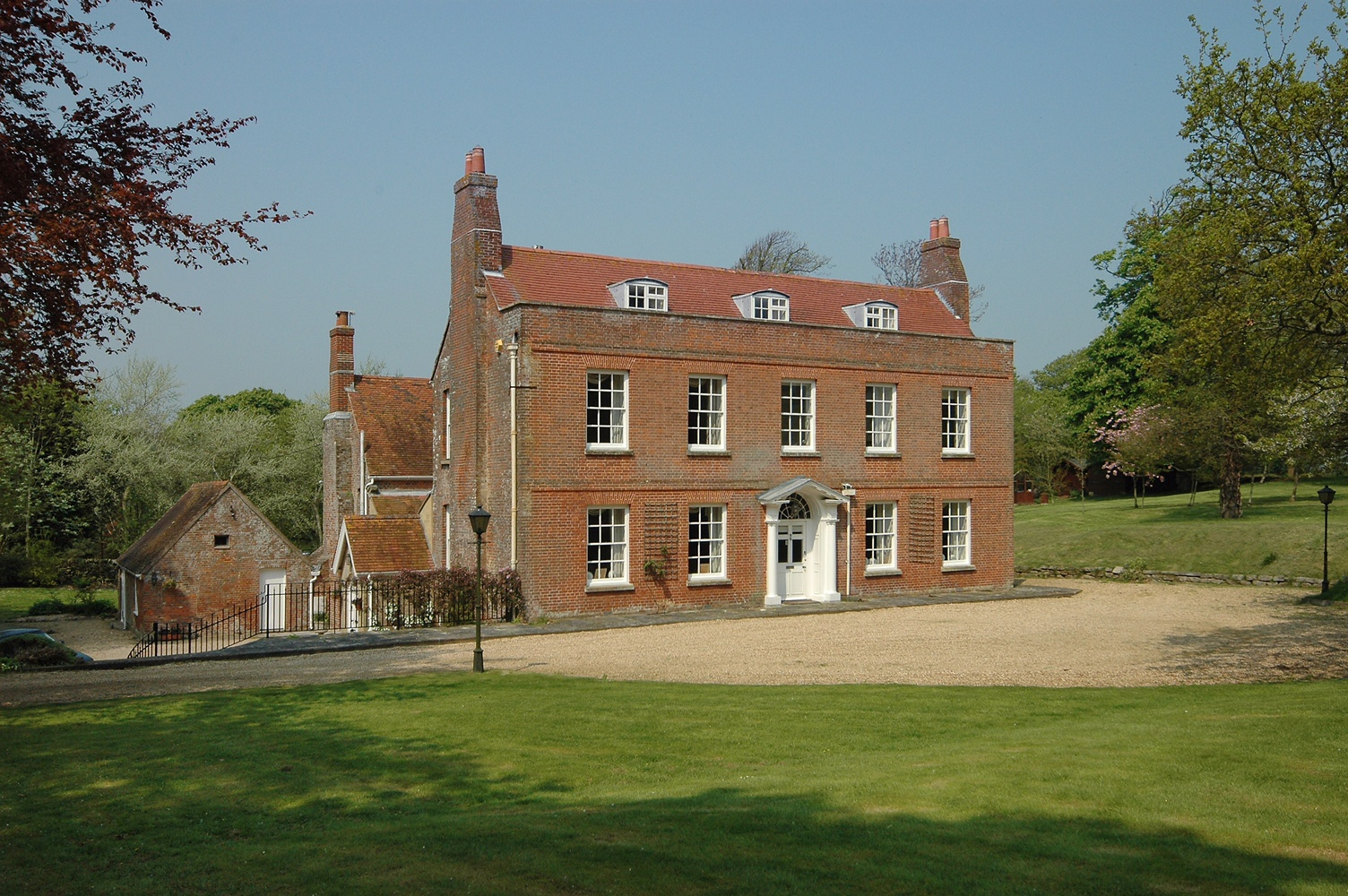
The frontage of the manor.

A stone cottage was built in the 15th century, then the main Georgian house was built in the mid to late 18th century, built with red brick. A brewhouse built with red brick was added around this time too, to the side of the stone cottage. With the main house, a doorcase features an open pediment over an arched doorway, while the interior has a Chinese Chippendale well staircase. Then during the 1960's the stone cottage and Georgian house were joined together, making it one large house.

Over the years, many improvements and additions have been made. 1990's - Tennis court. 2012 - Wooden stable block. 2015 - Swimming pool. 2018 - Thirteen car, L shaped, brick and stone garage block. 2021 - Barn.

Previous well known owners and occupants were: Henry V's page, Henry Sewell (First New Zealand prime minister and father to Anna Sewell, a novelist who wrote the 1877 novel Black Beauty).

The stable (built circa. 1795) at Pidford Manor became a Grade II listed building in 1993, when it got separated from the main grounds, is now called Highwood House and is accessed via Highwood Lane.
