= Richard Clarke Sewell =

English lawyer and first Dean of Melbourne Law School

Richard Clarke Sewell (1803 – 7 November 1864) was an English lawyer who later moved to Australia.

== Life ==
Sewell, eldest son of Thomas Sewell of Newport, Isle of Wight, brother of James Edwards Sewell, warden of New College, Oxford, Henry Sewell, premier of New Zealand, and of William Sewell, a Church of England clergyman, and the novelist Elizabeth Missing Sewell.

He was baptised at Newport on 6 February 1803, and entered Winchester College in 1818. He matriculated from Magdalen College, Oxford, on 26 July 1821, was a demy of his college from 1821 until 1837, and a fellow from 1837 to 1856. He served as senior dean of arts in 1838, as bursar 1840, and was vice-president and prælector of natural philosophy in 1843. He graduated with a second-class in lit. hum., B.A. 1826, M.A. 1829, and D.C.L. 1840. He was awarded the Newdigate prize in 1825 for an English poem on "The Temple of Vesta at Tivoli".

On 25 June 1830 he was called to the bar at the Middle Temple, became known as a special pleader, and took business on the western circuit and at the Hampshire sessions. Later in life he went to Australia, where he practised in the criminal law courts, and was in 1857 appointed reader in law to the University of Melbourne. On 17 April 1857, the university conferred on him the first law degree ad eundem awarded by an Australian university, a doctorate of laws (LL.D.), to which he was entitled by virtue of his Oxford doctorate. Sewell died in the Melbourne suburb of St Kilda on 7 November 1864, and was buried at Melbourne General Cemetery.

== Works ==
Sewell was a man of varied learning. He published: 1. "Collectanea Parliamentaria," 1831. 2. "A Digest of the New Statutes and Rules, with the Cases decided at Banc and at Nisi Prius," 1835. 3. "The Municipal Corporation Act, 5 and 6 Will. IV, c. 76," 1835. 4. "Vindiciæ Ecclesiasticæ, or a Legal and Historical Argument against the Abolition of the Bishops' Courts in Cases of Correction, as proposed by the Church Discipline Act," 1839. 4. "A Manual of the Law and Practice of Registration of Voters in England and Wales," 1835; 2nd ed. 1844. 5. "A Treatise on the Law of Sheriffs with practical Forms and Precedents," 1842. 6. "A Treatise on the Law of Coroner, with Precedents and Forms," 1843. 7. "A Letter to the Members of the Venerable House of Convocation [on the subject of the Proceedings against W. G. Ward]," 1845. 8. "Sacro-Politica: the Rights of the Anglican Church examined with, and tested by, the Laws of England and the Principles of the British Constitution," 1848. 9. "Legal Education: an Inaugural Lecture," Melbourne, 1857. 10. "The Speech of R. C. Sewell in defence of G. Chamberlain and W. Armstrong, charged with intent to murder W. Green," Melbourne, 1859.

For the English Historical Society Sewell edited "Gesta Stephani," 1846, and contributed to the Field "The Papers of a Hampshire Fisherman."
