= William Sewell (author) =

English school founder and divine, 1804–1874

William Henry Sewell (23 January 1804 – 14 November 1874), English divine and author, helped to found two public schools along high church Anglican lines. A devout churchman, learned scholar and reforming schoolmaster, he was strongly influenced by the Tractarians.

== Early life ==
Born at Newport, Isle of Wight, the second son of a solicitor and Fellow of The Queen's College, Oxford. He had six brothers and five sisters. Among his brothers were Richard Clarke Sewell, a recognised poet, legal writer and Fellow of Magdalen College, Oxford, Henry Sewell, who worked in the family firm before emigrating to become Premier of New Zealand, and James Edwards Sewell, Warden of New College, Oxford (1860–1903). His sister Elizabeth Missing Sewell wrote devotional religious books and children's stories and founded Ventnor St Boniface School for girls.

William Sewell was educated at Winchester, which he disliked as he was bullied. He went up to Merton College, Oxford, where he gained a postmastership and a first in Literae Humaniores. He was elected a Petreian Fellow of Exeter College in 1827, and then won both the Chancellor's English Essay Prize and the Chancellor's Latin Essay Prize. He was only 26 when he was ordained. From 1831 to 1853 he was a tutor at Exeter College, an Examiner in Greats, Librarian to the college, Sub-Rector, and by 1839 also Dean.

== Tractarians ==
In 1835 Sewell applied for the Headmastership of Winchester, but was defeated by Dr Moberley by one vote. From 1836 to 1841 he was White's Professor of Moral Philosophy. Sewell, having taken holy orders in 1830, became a friend of Edward Pusey, John Henry Newman, John Keble and Hurrell Froude in the earlier days of the Tractarian movement, but finding that the Tractarians leant too much towards Rome, later dissociated himself from them. The plot of Sewell's novel Hawkstone opposed Newman's position at the time. When in 1849 J.A. Froude published his Nemesis of Faith, Sewell denounced the book to his class, and when a pupil of his confessed to possessing a copy, Sewell seized it, tore it to pieces and threw it in the fire.

== St Columba's & St Peter's College, Radley ==
In April 1843, Sewell and his friends Monsell and Todd founded at Stackallan House, County Meath, St Columba's College, designed to be a sort of Irish Winchester and Eton "and something more than Winchester or Eton." It was set in beautiful countryside. In 1861 the Clarendon Commission defined it as a public school, but Sewell's aim was to provide an Anglican education for the ailing Church in Ireland, with emphasis on pastoral care and rigorous classical disciplines. The school was supported by the nobility and church. From Lord Boyne Singleton and Sewell rented the land with conspicuous approval from the Archbishop of Armagh, Lord George de la Poer Beresford, the college's Governor. Sewell hoped to inspire boys in locis parentis, giving them cubicles to live in and "strengthen, enlarge and purify their minds." With the classics they were to teach modern languages, modern history and mathematics, drawing, architecture and the Irish language.

Sewell was disliked at St Columba's. Despite his trips to raise much-needed funds, his college showed bad faith towards a financial supporter who brought it much furniture and silver. His connections at Oxford, particularly Magdalen College, were useful. Another substantial Sewell contribution was a large library collection. His colleagues wanted a more relaxed Irish Gaelic school, whereas he was known to have punished boys for failing to show table manners befitting young gentlemen. Cold showers and hard beatings were necessary, but Sewell believed the most dreaded exclusion to be from chapel. Emphasis on regular attendance at Evensong and Matins was central to his scholastic vision of a High Church interpretation of the Book of Common Prayer. While he also gained a reputation for high standards of cleanliness and medical health. Singleton agreed with Sewell that there must be fasting and feast days, but this offended Irish Protestant sensibilities. The Fellows Lord Adare and William Monsell converted to Roman Catholicism. In May 1846 he resigned with Warden Singleton to return to Oxford and Exeter College, having been outvoted by the Fellows of St Columba's.

Singleton met in Turl Street to discuss the opening of another college. On 9 June 1847, he helped to found Radley College, installing Singleton as Warden. Sewell's intention was that this school too should be conducted on strict High Church principles.

Sewell was originally himself one of the managers of St Columba's, and later the third Warden of Radley, but his business management was unsuccessful in both cases, and his personal responsibility for the debts contracted by Radley caused the sequestration of his Oxford fellowship. In 1862 his financial difficulties compelled him to leave England for Germany, where he remained until 1870.

== Reputation ==
Sewell was a prolific writer of sermons, commentaries, poetry and translations. His many correspondents included William Gladstone. He contributed to the political Quarterly Review on various subjects.

Contemporaries sometimes found Sewell's pedagogical style off-putting in its dogmatism and long-windedness:

A taint of superficiality clung to him: "Sewell is very unreal," wrote Newman to Bowden in 1840; "Preaches his dreams" was shrewd Shuttleworth's comment on his University sermons; "Sewell," said Jowett in 1848, "Sewell, talking rashly and positively, ... has gone far to produce that very doubt and scepticism of which he himself complains." "How silent you have been, Jacobson," said he at the end of a large gathering in his rooms, where, as usual, he had done all the talking; "you have not said anything worth listening to." "Nor heard," was Jacobson's answer.

== Publications ==
- Translations of the Agamemnon (1846), Georgics (1846 and 1854) and Odes and Epodes of Horace (1850)
- Christian Morals (1840)
- Reviews of Thomas Carlyle's works, Quarterly Review, 66 (September 1840)
- An Introduction to the Dialogues of Plato (1841)
- A letter to the Rev. E. B.Pusey, D.D., on the publication of No.90 of the Tracts for the Times (Oxford, 1841)
- Christian Politics (1844)
- Hawkstone: a tale of and for England (fiction) (1845)
- Journal of a Residence at the College of St Columba (April 1847) (2nd ed. 1848)
- The Nation, the Church and the University of Oxford (1849)
- Suggestions for the Extension of the University, Submitted to the Rev. the Vice-Chancellor (Oxford, 1850)
- Collegiate Reform: a Sermon Preached before the University of Oxford, on the first Sunday in Advent, 1853 (Oxford, 1853)
- [William Sewell], A Speech at the Annual Dinner of the Old Radleians, Held at Willis Rooms, 22 June 1872, by the Founders, W.S. (Oxford, 1873)
- Reminiscences in two volumes (1873)
- A Year's Sermons to Boys preached in the Chapel of St Peter's College, Radley (1854)
- Sermons for Boys preached in the Chapel of St Peter's College, Radley (1859)
- Christian Vestiges of Creation (1861)
