= Henry Sewell =

Premier of New Zealand in 1856

The Honourable Henry Sewell
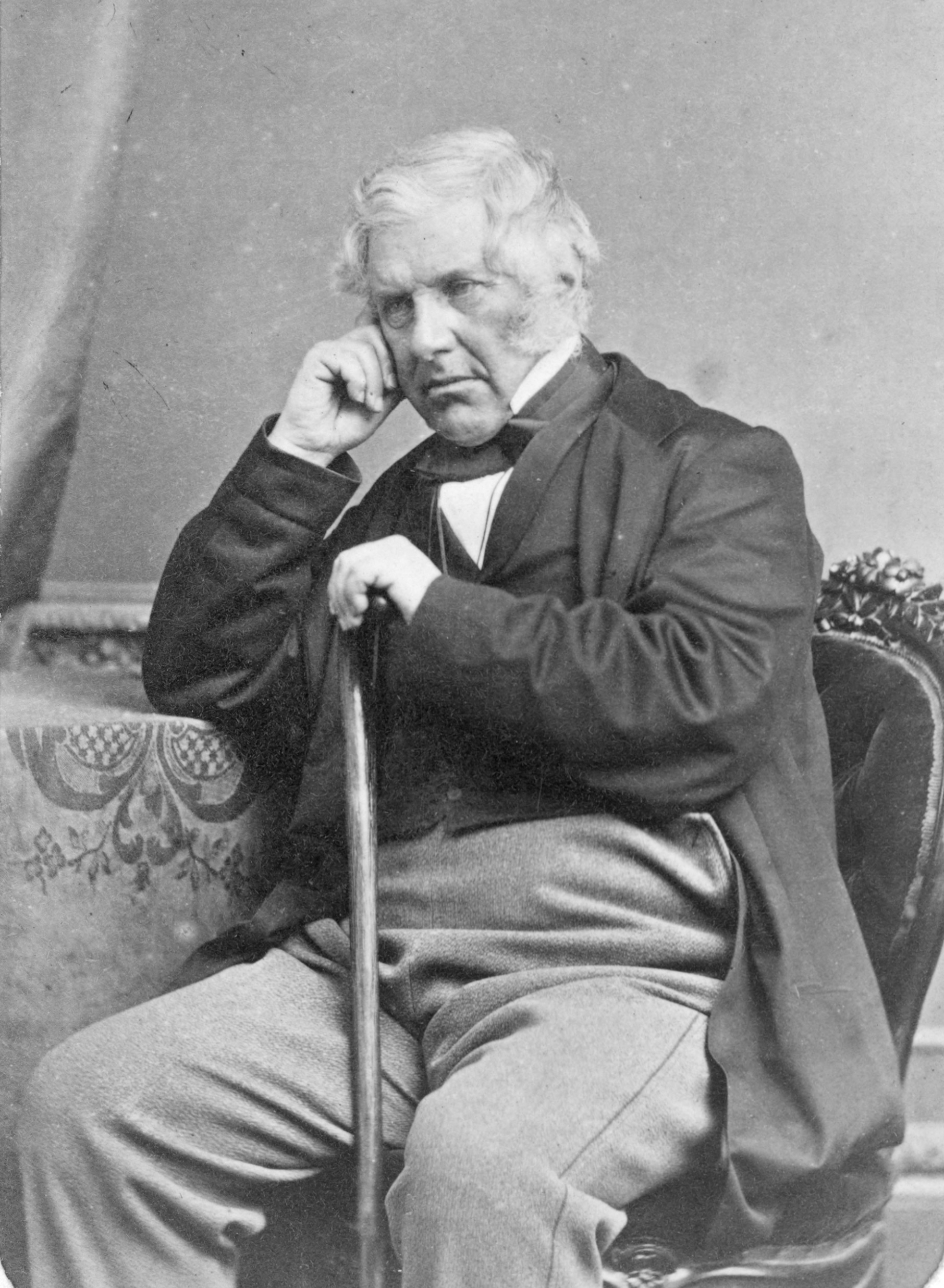
- Sewell c. 1872

1st Premier of New Zealand
- In office 7 May 1856 – 20 May 1856
- Monarch: Victoria
- Governor: Thomas Gore Browne
- Preceded by: Office established
- Succeeded by: Sir William Fox

3rd Colonial Secretary of New Zealand
- In office 7 May 1856 – 20 May 1856
- Governor: Thomas Gore Browne

Member of the New Zealand Legislative Council
- In office 1861–1865

Personal details
- Born: 7 September 1807 Newport, Isle of Wight, England
- Died: 14 May 1879 (aged 71) Cambridge, England
- Party: Independent
- Spouses: Lucinda Nedham (m. 1834; died 1844); Elizabeth Kittoe (m. 1850)
- Children: 6
- Relatives: Richard Clarke Sewell (brother); William Sewell (brother); James Edwards Sewell (brother); Elizabeth Missing Sewell (sister)
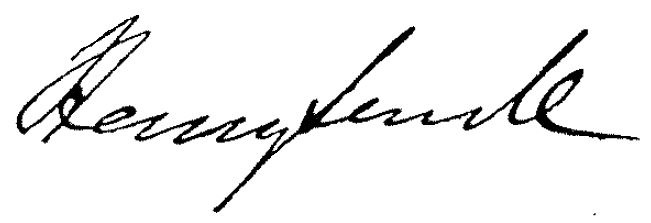
- Signature

Henry Sewell (/ˈsjuːəl/; 7 September 1807 – 14 May 1879) was a New Zealand politician. He was a notable campaigner for New Zealand self-government, and is generally regarded as having been the country's first premier (a post that would later be officially titled "Prime Minister"), having led the Sewell Ministry in 1856. He later served as Colonial Treasurer (1856–1859), as Attorney-General (1861–1862), and twice as Minister of Justice (1864–1865, 1869–1872).

== Early life ==
Sewell was the fourth son of Thomas Sewell, a solicitor, and his wife Jane née Edwards. He was born on 7 September 1807 in the town of Newport and lived in Pidford Manor on England's Isle of Wight. He was educated at Hyde Abbey School near Winchester. He qualified as a solicitor, and joined his father's law firm in 1826.

In 1840, however, Sewell's father lost a staggering sum of money when a bank failed, and died shortly afterwards, leaving the family with a great deal of debt. This put considerable strain on Sewell. In 1844, Sewell also suffered from the untimely death of his wife Lucinda (whom he had married on 15 May 1834 and had six children with). He put his sister in charge of his children and his mother and moved to London for better opportunities.

Sewell remarried, probably on 23 January 1850, and made plans to emigrate with his new wife Elizabeth Kittoe to New Zealand, hoping for improved financial prospects in the colony.

Sewell's connection to New Zealand arose through the Canterbury Association, a British organisation dedicated to the colonisation of the New Zealand region known as Canterbury. It is probable that John Simeon introduced Sewell to the Association, and he interacted greatly with John's brother Charles. Until Sewell's departure for New Zealand, he was the Association's deputy director, and contributed greatly to its activities. The Association's plan for colonisation encountered a number of serious problems, however, and considerable debts were incurred. Sewell was instrumental in solving these problems. Sewell personally arrived in Lyttelton, the port of Christchurch (the principal settlement in Canterbury) on 2 February 1853, hoping to sort out what remained of the colony's problems. Gradually, and despite conflict with provincial superintendent James FitzGerald, Sewell managed to get the colony back onto a reasonable course. Charles Simeon and family lived in Canterbury from October 1851 to December 1855, and they were the only people who Sewell and his wife socialised with.

== Political career ==
=== 1st Parliament ===
New Zealand Parliament
Years	Term	Electorate	Party
1853–1855	1st	Town of Christchurch	Independent
1855–1856	2nd	Town of Christchurch	Independent
1860	2nd	Town of Christchurch	Independent
1865–1866	3rd	Town of New Plymouth	Independent

Sewell's diary, published in 1980 as the Sewell Journal in two volumes, gives a unique insight into his life in the colony. The journal's editor, historian W. David McIntyre, calls it "the most absorbing and undoubtedly the fullest private manuscript relating to New Zealand in the 1850s". In late July 1853, Sewell decided that he would stand for Parliament in the 1853 general election; the question was whether he should run in the Town of Christchurch or the Christchurch Country electorate. There was one position to be filled in the town electorate, and two in the rural electorate. Sewell sought counsel from some friends, who recommended for him to stand in the rural electorate, but he did not want to oppose Guise Brittan, who had already declared his candidacy. Whilst Brittan was unpopular with the constituency, Sewell thought that it would be useful to have him in Parliament. The complication with the town electorate was that John Watts-Russell had already received a pledge from the majority of that constituency, but there were rumours that he would not stand, and it was known that he was just about to go travelling during the time of the election campaign. Sewell talked to Brittan, who fully supported him standing in the town electorate, and Brittan pledged that he would get his brother-in-law, Charles Fooks, to canvas for him. Sewell first advertised his candidacy in the Lyttelton Times on 30 July. In the same edition of the newspaper, James Stuart-Wortley and Guise Brittan advertised their candidacy for the Christchurch Country electorate. Jerningham Wakefield reiterated his candidacy for the Christchurch Country electorate in early August upon his return from Wellington. At the same time, Fooks announced his candidacy for the Town of Christchurch electorate. With James FitzGerald, who had just been elected the first Superintendent of the Canterbury Province, apparently in support of Watts-Russell, Sewell decided to withdraw from the contest, but decided to go ahead with a public meeting to 'speak his mind'. On 4 August, he held a meeting at the Golden Fleece, a hotel on the corner of Colombo and Armagh Streets, and addressed between 30 and 40 electors. He discussed all the issues that Parliament should deal with, but finished by saying that he would not be available as a candidate, as Watts-Russell had been pledged the support of the constituency. After an awkward period of silence, Richard Packer stood up and replied:

We are in an awkward position. Here was a Gentleman who told [us] all sorts of things which a Representative ought to attend to and then declined standing himself, because of another Candidate whose intentions no one knew anything about—and who was just on the point of starting for an excursion without giving any one an opportunity of learning his sentiments about anything.

The meeting expressed dissatisfaction with Watts-Russell and that they would not hold themselves bound to support him. FitzGerald spoke in support of Watts-Russell, but was not well received. Fooks then spoke, but mainly to attack Sewell. The following day, Sewell met with FitzGerald and discussed that either himself or Watts-Russell should retire from the contest, but that if he himself was to retire, then Watts-Russell or at least some of his friends should inform the constituency about his intentions. FitzGerald's impression was that it should be Watts-Russell who should retire. Later that day, Watts-Russell wrote an announcement that he would retire from the contest, which was published in the Lyttelton Times on 13 August.

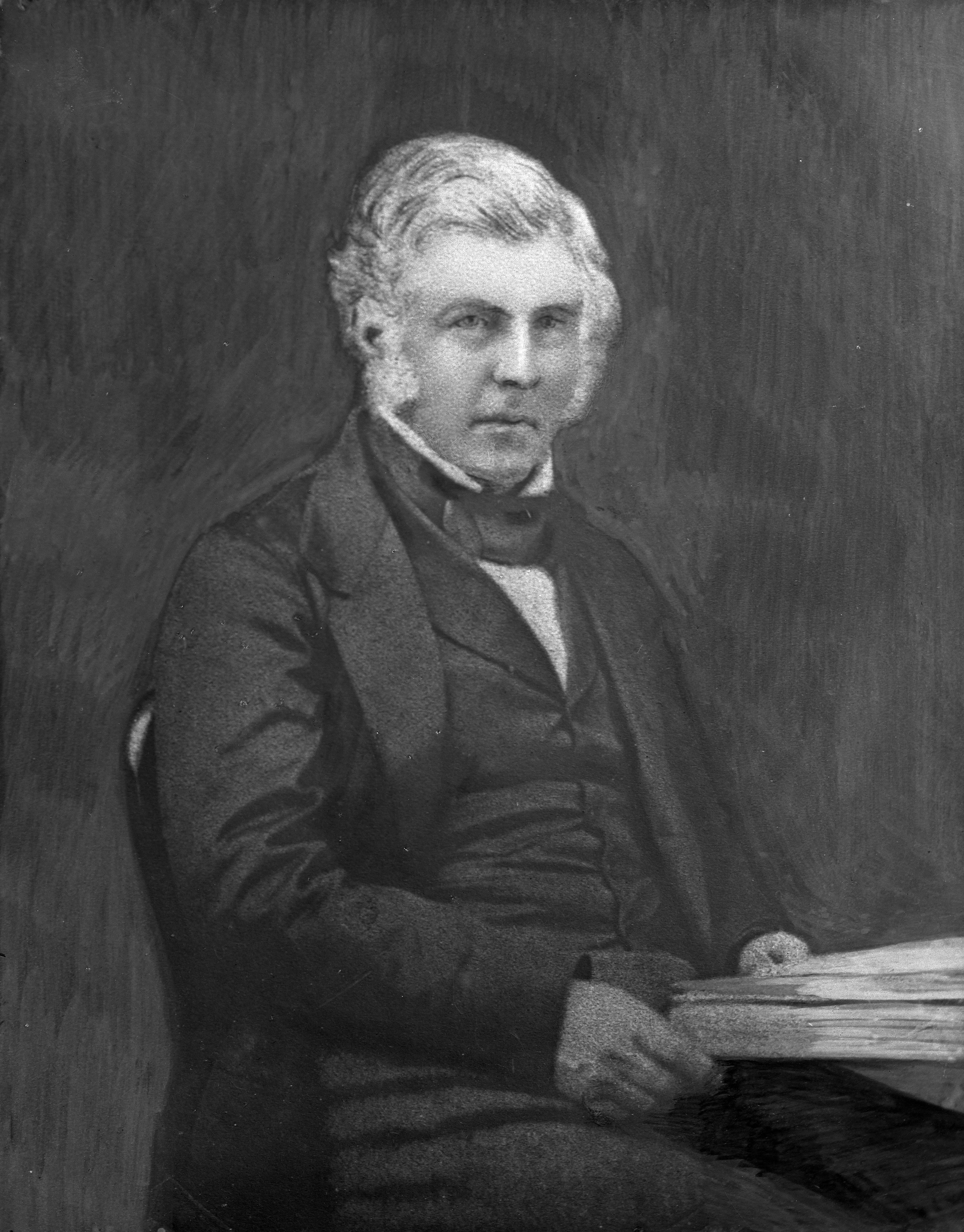
Henry Sewell in 1856

On 9 August, the Colonists' Society held a meeting at the White Hart Hotel. Christchurch's first hotel was on the High Street (then called Sumner Road) and Cashel Street corner, with Michael Hart as proprietor. The 50 to 60 attendees were addressed by Sewell, Stuart-Wortley, and Wakefield. As a result, committees were formed that were to achieve the return of these three candidates. At this point, Sewell thought that Brittan would not have a chance of getting elected, as he was most unpopular, and he refused to go canvassing. Over the next few days, Octavius Mathias, the vicar of St Michael and All Angels, was Sewell's main antagonist.

The nominations for the town and country electorates were held together on Tuesday, 16 August. The hustings were erected in front of the Land Office (these days the site of Our City). The three candidates for the Christchurch Country electorate spoke first, with Stuart-Wortley and Wakefield winning the show of hand, and Brittan visibly offended, but demanding a poll. Sewell was proposed by John Hall, and seconded by postmaster and storekeeper Charles Wellington Bishop. Fooks was proposed by Joshua Charles Porter (a lawyer; later Mayor of Kaiapoi), and seconded by the publican Michael Hart. Whilst Sewell's speech was well received, Fooks was laughed at and interrupted (Sewell said that Fooks did him "more service than [he] could have done [him]self"). The show of hands was in favour of Sewell; no more than five hands were raised in support of Fooks.

The election was held on Saturday, 20 August, between 9 am and 4 pm. The method of voting at the time was that an elector would tell the returning officer his choice of candidate. As this happened in public, a tally of the votes could be kept, and Fooks was initially ahead, but within an hour, Sewell passed him. The final result was 61 votes to 34 for Sewell, who was thus declared elected.

Sewell's legal and financial skill was of considerable use in Parliament, although he was criticised as elitist and aloof. In terms of the political spectrum of the day, which ranged "centralists" against "provincialists", Sewell adopted a moderate position, although he later became gradually more centralist. With regard New Zealand self-rule, the other major issue of the time, Sewell was strongly in favour. When the Acting Governor, Robert Wynyard, appointed Sewell and several other politicians as "unofficial" members of the Executive Council, Sewell believed that self-government would soon begin. When it became apparent that Wynyard regarded the appointments as temporary, and that he did not believe Parliament could assume responsibility for governance without royal assent, Sewell and his colleagues resigned.

=== 2nd Parliament and premiership ===
A new Governor, Thomas Gore Browne, subsequently announced that self-government would begin with the 2nd New Zealand Parliament. Sewell once again stood for election, and was successful. Sewell was asked by the Governor to form a government, now known as the Sewell Ministry. He was appointed to the Executive Council on 18 April 1856, and became Colonial Secretary on 7 May. Dillon Bell became Colonial Treasurer (Finance Minister), Frederick Whitaker became Attorney-General, and Henry Tancred from the Legislative Council became a minister without portfolio.

Sewell's government was short-lived, however, due to its strong centralist tendencies. The leader of the provincialist faction, William Fox, defeated Sewell's government on 20 May 1856. Fox himself, however, did not retain office for long, being defeated by Edward Stafford, a moderate. Stafford invited Sewell to become Colonial Treasurer in the new government. In this role, Sewell was instrumental in drafting a financial compact between the central and provincial governments.

In late 1856, Sewell stepped down as Treasurer and resigned his seat, but remained an unofficial member of the Executive Council, to return to England. There, he negotiated a number of deals for New Zealand. William Richmond became Treasurer in his absence. In 1859, when Sewell returned to New Zealand, he became Treasurer once again, but stepped down again after only a month, leaving Richmond to resume the role.

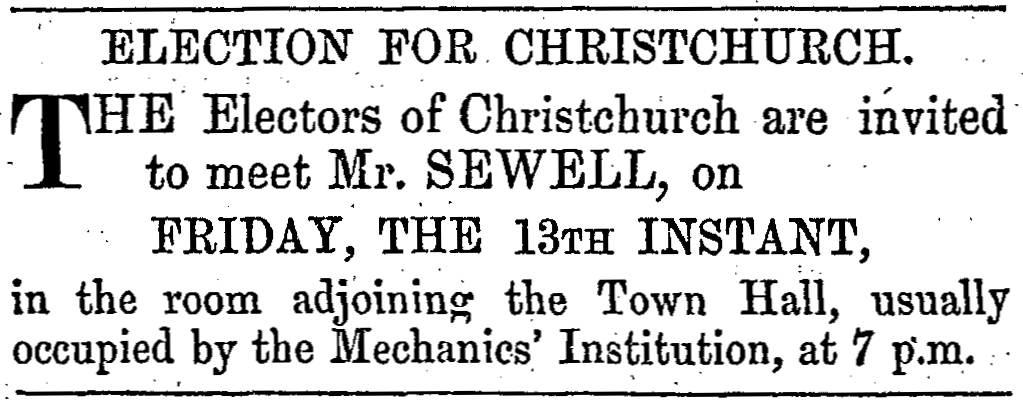
Advertisement of Henry Sewell, published in the Lyttelton Times on 7 January 1860

In the 18 January 1860 by-election, Sewell contested the Christchurch electorate successfully against Michael Hart. He resigned towards the end of 1860 to become Registrar-General of Lands.

=== Executive positions and Legislative Council ===
In 1861, he was appointed by Fox to the Legislative Council, a position that he held until 1865.

When fighting broke out with Māori in 1860 over land grievances, Sewell attempted to promote negotiation and compromise. Sewell, who was a mild pacifist, believed that conflict with Māori could only properly be resolved by introducing a fair method of land purchase, one which did not involve coercion. To this end, he twice proposed a Native Council Bill, which would have created Māori-run institutions with the authority to supervise all Māori land deals. Both attempts failed. Sewell later resigned from a post as Attorney-General over the government's land confiscation policies. Soon afterwards, he published a pamphlet entitled The New Zealand native rebellion, in which explained his views on the causes of (and solutions to) the conflict with Māori.

Later in his political career, Sewell briefly held positions as Attorney-General, Minister of Justice, and Colonial Secretary (the latter being distinct from the Premiership by this time).

During his career he represented the Town of Christchurch 1853–1856 (resigned) and 1860 (retired), and the Town of New Plymouth 1865–1866. He was defeated in 1866 for Lyttelton by Edward Hargreaves. He served on the Legislative Council from 1861 to 1865.

== Later life ==
In 1873, Sewell retired from politics and returned to England shortly afterwards. He died in Cambridge on 14 May 1879 and is buried in Waresley, Huntingdonshire.

== See also ==
- Elizabeth Missing Sewell, sister, author of religious & educational works and novels
- James Edwards Sewell, brother, Warden of New College, Oxford
- Richard Clarke Sewell, brother, barrister and reader in law to the University of Melbourne
- William Sewell, brother, Church of England clergyman and author

== Notes ==
New Zealand Parliament
New constituency	Member of Parliament for Christchurch; 1853–1856; 1860	Succeeded by Richard Packer
Preceded by Richard Packer	Member of Parliament for Christchurch; 1853–1856; 1860	Succeeded by John Cracroft Wilson
Preceded by Charles Brown	Member of Parliament for New Plymouth; 1865	Succeeded by John Richardson
Government offices
New office	Premier of New Zealand; 1856	Succeeded by William Fox
Preceded by Andrew Sinclair	Colonial Secretary of New Zealand; 1856	Succeeded by John Hall
Preceded by William Fox	Attorney-General; 1861–1862; 1862–1863; 1864–1865	Succeeded by Thomas Gillies
Preceded by Thomas Gillies	Attorney-General; 1861–1862; 1862–1863; 1864–1865	Succeeded by Frederick Whitaker
Preceded by Frederick Whitaker	Attorney-General; 1861–1862; 1862–1863; 1864–1865	Succeeded by James Prendergast
New office	Minister of Justice; 1870–1871	Succeeded by John Bathgate
