= James Edwards Sewell =

English academic

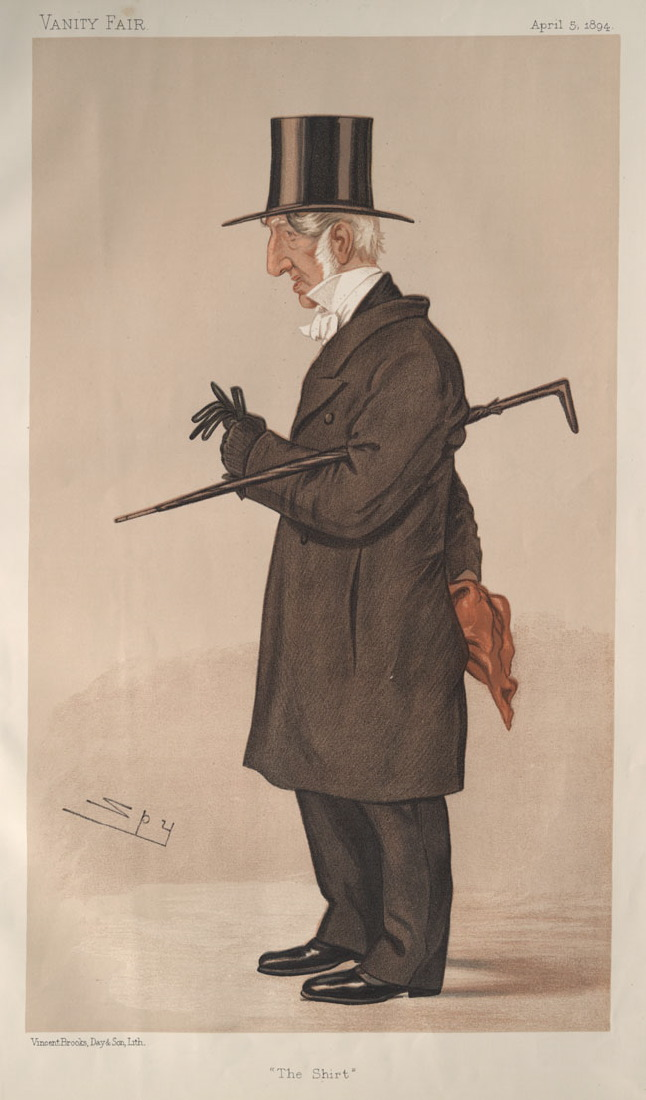
"The Shirt". Caricature by Spy published in Vanity Fair in 1894.

James Edwards Sewell (25 December 1810 – 29 January 1903) was an English academic, Warden of New College, Oxford, from 1860 to 1903.

== Life ==
Sewell was born on Christmas Day 1810, at Newport, Isle of Wight, where his father Thomas Sewell practiced as a lawyer. He was the youngest son of a large family, and was educated at Winchester College and New College. In 1830 he became a Fellow of New College, and practically passed the rest of his life there, being elected to the headship in 1860. He was ordained deacon in 1834 and priest in 1835, and briefly held a curacy in a village near Oxford, but was soon back at New College as tutor and later bursar.

From 1860 he was warden of New College. The first University Commission had just released the colleges from the fetters of their original statutes, and Sewell was called on to determine his attitude towards the strong reforming party in New College. Though himself instinctively conservative, he determined that it was his duty to give effect to the desire of the majority, with the result that New College led the way in the general reform movement, and from being one of the smallest became the second largest college in Oxford. Sewell was vice-chancellor of the University of Oxford 1874–78.

He died at his lodgings at New College on 29 January 1903, in his ninety-third year, having been warden of the college for 43 years, and was interred in the college cloisters.

== Family ==
His brother Henry Sewell became the first premier of New Zealand. Another brother, William Sewell, was a writer, as was sister Elizabeth Missing Sewell. His brother Richard Clarke Sewell was a barrister and later reader in law to the University of Melbourne and author of a large number of legal works.

== Sources ==
Academic offices
Preceded by David Williams	Warden of New College, Oxford; 1860–1903	Succeeded by William Archibald Spooner
Preceded by Henry George Liddell	Vice-Chancellor of Oxford University; 1874–1878	Succeeded by Evan Evans
