= Harriet Thompson =

Harriet Thompson may refer to:

- Harriet Diana Thompson (1811–1896), Victorian writer
- Harriet Alfarata Thompson (1871–1922), American author
- Harriet Thompson (diplomat), high commissioner of the United Kingdom to Ghana since 2021
- Princess Wee Wee, stage name of Harriet Elizabeth Thompson (born c 1892) dancer and performer with dwarfism

== See also ==
- Harriette Thompson (1923–2017), American classical pianist
