= Edward Healy Thompson =

English Roman Catholic writer

Edward Healy Thompson (1813, Oakham, Rutland - 21 May 1891, Cheltenham, Gloucestershire) was an English Roman Catholic writer.

== Life ==
Thompson was the son of Robert and Mary Costall Thompson. His father was a tax surveyor successively at Oakham, Bath, and Salisbury. The poet Francis Thompson was his nephew.

He was educated at Oakham School and Emmanuel College, Cambridge. Having taken Anglican orders, he obtained a curacy at Calne, Wiltshire. The clergyman poet William Lisle Bowles was a neighbour in nearby Bremhill.

After some years of the Anglican ministry at Marylebone, Ramsgate, and elsewhere, he became a Catholic in 1846. He published as his defence, "Remarks on certain Anglican Theories of Unity" (1846).

In 1851, jointly with James Spencer Northcote he undertook the editorship of the series of controversial pamphlets known as The Clifton Tracts. He was a contributor and sub-editor of the Dublin Review from 1863 to early 1865, but he and Henry James Coleridge left when editor William George Ward refused to publish a major article on the reviews of John Henry Newman's Apologia Pro Vita Sua. Ward was inclined to give the book as little publicity as possible.

In the mid-1880s, he lived on Hinde Street, Manchester Square. He was a contributor to Wilfrid Meynell's Merrie England magazine. The latter years of his life, which were spent at Cheltenham, he devoted to religious literature.

== Works ==
Thompson was a promoter of Catholic literature. Most of this work consisted in the adaptations of foreign books which he thought were of value to English-speaking Catholics.

His chief works are:

- "A Triumph of Christianity: or, A Few Observations Upon the Discontinuance of "The Tracts for the Times" (1841); and
- "The Unity of the Episcopate Considered" (1847); and
- "A few earnest thoughts on the Duty of Communion with the Catholic Church" (1847); and
- "A Library of Religious Biography":
  - Vol I. "The Life of St. Aloysius Gonzaga, of the Company of Jesus" (1867); and
  - Vol II. "The Life of Marie-Eustelle Harpain, The Sempstress of Saint-Pallais" (1868); and
  - Vol III. "The Life of Stanislas Kostka, of the Company of Jesus" (1881); and
  - Vol IV. "The Life of the Baron de Renty; Or, Perfection in the World Exemplified" (1881); and
  - Vol V. "The Life of the Venerable Anna Maria Taigi: The Roman Matron" (1873); and
  - Vol VI. "The Life of Marie Lataste: Lay-Sister of the Congregation of the Sacred Heart" (1877); and
  - Vol VII. "The Life of Henri-Marie Boudon, Archdeacon of Evreux" (1881); and
  - Vol VIII. "The Life of Leon Papin-Dupont, The Holy Man of Tours" (1881); and
  - Vol IX. "The Life of Jean-Baptiste Muard: Founder of the Congregation of St. Edme and of the Monastery of La Pierre-qui-Vire" (1886).
- "The Life of M. Olier" (1861); and
- "The Life and Glories of St. Joseph" (1888); and
- "Before and After Gunpowder Plot" (1890).

He also translated several works by Henri-Marie Boudon:

- "Devotion to the Nine Choirs of Holy Angels" (1869); and
- "The Hidden Life of Jesus, A Lesson and Model to Christians" (1869); and
- "The Holy Ways of the Cross, or, A Short Treatise on the Various Trials and Afflictions, Interior and Exterior, to Which the Spiritual Life is Subject, and the Means of Making a Good Use Thereof" (1875).

== Family ==
On 30 July 1844 at Marylebone, he married Harriet Diana Calvert, daughter of Nicholson Calvert of Hunsdon and Frances Pery, daughter and co-heir of the Viscount Pery. Born at Hunsdon, Hertfordshire, 1811; Harriet died at Cheltenham, Gloucestershire, 21 Aug., 1896. On her husband's conversion she also joined the Catholic Church, and like him devoted herself to literary work. Her chief work is the "Life of Charles Borromeo", but she also wrote stories of Catholic life. These include: "Mary, Star of the Sea" (1848); "The Witch of Malton Hill"; "Mount St. Lawrence" (1850); "Winefride Jones" (1854); "Margaret Danvers" (1857); "The Wyndham Family" (1876); and others, as well as articles in the Dublin Review.

== Sources ==
- Meynell, Everard (1916). The Life of Francis Thompson. Burnes & Oates.
