= James F. Donnelly (writer) =

Deaf journalist and advocate

James F. Donnelly (April 28, 1861—February 1934) was an American printer, writer and editor. A Catholic and deaf, he founded The Catholic Deaf-Mute, a monthly periodical dedicated to serving the needs and interests of Deaf Catholics.

== Early life and education ==
Donnelly was born in Brooklyn, New York on April 28, 1861 to James and Mary (nee O'Rourke) Donnelly. At age eight or nine, he became deaf from scarlet fever. He attended the New York Institute for the Deaf where he learned printing. While still in school, he was elected secretary of the Catholic Literary and Benevolent Union of the Deaf-Mute.

== Career ==
Donnelly worked for a decade as manager and editor of The Catholic Youth, then as printer for the Messenger of the Sacred Heart. He also authored several children's stories under the pen name Peter Cadwallader published in The Catholic Youth and other Catholic publications.

Understanding firsthand the need of a newspaper that catered to the Deaf Catholic community, in 1900 at age 39, he launched The Catholic Deaf-Mute. According to the History of the Diocese of Brooklyn, 1853-1953, "it was the first paper of its kind in the United States". A monthly periodical, it became a leading authority regarding issues and interests of the deaf and mute. Ran from his home in Richmond Hill, New York City, Donnelly was the editor and set the type face until his wife learned to set the type face with their children assembling the pages. While the paper had a national circulation, it was a financial loss.

After becoming ill, Donnelly retired in December 1933 with Father Micheal Purcell taking over as editor. Purcell renamed it Ephpheta, the name of a previous deaf-run Catholic publication which ceased in 1919. A collection of The Catholic Deaf-Mute is held at the College of the Holy Cross as part of their Deaf Catholic Archives.

== Personal life and death ==
Donnelly was married to Ellen F. Donnelly and had nine children. He died in February 1934.
