= Henry Coleridge =

Henry Coleridge may refer to:

- Henry Nelson Coleridge (1798–1843), editor of the works of his uncle Samuel Taylor Coleridge
- Henry James Coleridge (1822–1893), writer on religious affairs and preacher
