= The Rambler (Catholic periodical) =

British periodical (1848–1862)

The Rambler was a Catholic periodical founded by liberal converts to Catholicism and closely associated with the names of Lord Acton, Richard Simpson and, for a brief period, John Henry Newman. It was one of the leading English Catholic magazines of the nineteenth century.

It represented a phase of convert thought which was in opposition to the extreme ultramontanism of William George Ward and Henry Edward Manning, eventually leading to increasing friction with the leading members of the newly established English hierarchy.

== History ==
The Rambler was started on 1 January 1848, and its last number was published in May 1862. According to its final number:

The Rambler was commenced on 1st of January 1848 as a weekly magazine of home and foreign literature, politics, science and art. Its aim was to unite an intelligent and hearty acceptance of Catholic dogma with free enquiry and discussion on questions which the Church left open to debate and while avoiding, as far as possible, the domain of technical theology, to provide a medium for the expression of independent opinion on subjects of the day, whether interesting to the general public or especially affecting Catholics.

The Rambler had been founded by John Moore Capes, onetime president of the Oxford Union. It was originally a weekly magazine. John Henry Newman wrote verses that were published and counseled Capes to avoid controversy with Wiseman's competing publication, the Dublin Review. Before the end of the year, The Rambler was so successful that it was decided to increase the number of pages and to issue it in a monthly form. It continued to be published as a monthly serial from 1 September 1848 to 1 February 1859.

James Spencer Northcote, like Capes, a teacher at Prior Park College, had spent three years in Rome, some of the time with noted archaeologist Giovanni Battista de Rossi. Northcote contributed a number of articles on the Roman catacombs. From June 1852, until September 1854, he served as editor. After his wife's death in 1853 Northcote began to focus his attention on preparing for the priesthood,

In 1850 Richard Simpson began to write for The Rambler, and in 1856 became assistant editor.

From May 1859, a slightly larger version was published every two months. The last number was published in May 1862, and a quarterly journal, The Home and Foreign Review, under the same editorial management, appeared in its place in July of that year. This became one of the most distinguished periodicals of its day, and was praised by Matthew Arnold.

Sir John (later Lord) Acton was the principal proprietor of The Rambler. In 1858, Simpson became editor and a proprietor. He ran into conflict with those who disapproved of a layman writing about theology and of his liberal views, and was forced to resign in 1859, being briefly replaced with Newman. Acton became the editor in 1859, upon Newman's retirement from the position.

== Editors ==
- John Moore Capes (1 January 1848 to June, 1852)
- James Spencer Northcote (June, 1852 to September 1854)
- John Moore Capes (September 1854 to 5 October 1857)
