= Dr Rock =

Dr Rock may refer to:

== People ==
- Daniel Rock (1799–1871), English Roman Catholic priest, ecclesiologist and antiquarian
- John Rock (scientist) (1890–1984), American obstetrician and developer of the first birth control pill
- Richard Rock (1690?–1777), well-known English doctor depicted by Hogarth
- Charles White (Dr Rock) (born 1942), Irish-born BBC Radio and TV presenter

== Other uses ==
- "Doctor Rock", a 1986 song by Motörhead from Orgasmatron
- "Dr. Rock", a 1991 song by Ween from The Pod
- Doctor Rock is a character in the movie Salvador
