= Our Lady of the Angels and St Peter in Chains Church, Stoke-on-Trent =

Our Lady and St Peter's Church
- Our Lady of the Angels and St Peter in Chains Church
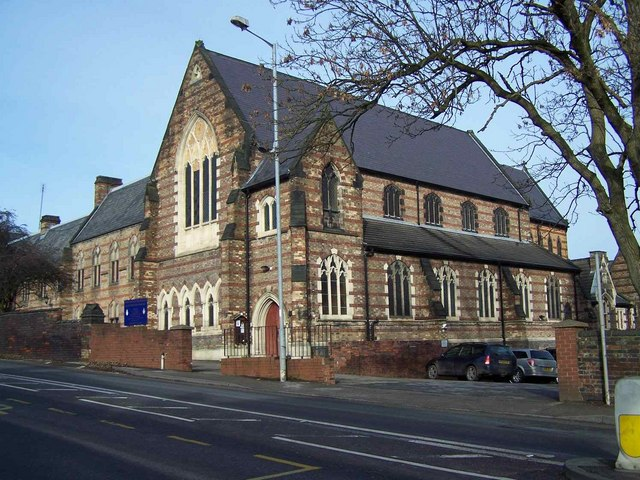
- Our Lady and St Peter's Church
- 53.0081°N 2.1895°W
- OS grid reference: SJ 87383 45664
- Location: Stoke-on-Trent
- Country: England
- Denomination: Roman Catholic
- Website: OurLadyandStPeterStoke.org.uk

History
- Status: Parish church
- Dedication: Our Lady of the Angels; Saint Peter in Chains

Architecture
- Functional status: Active
- Heritage designation: Grade II listed
- Designated: 15 March 1993
- Architect: Charles Hansom
- Style: Gothic Revival
- Groundbreaking: 1856
- Completed: 1857

Administration
- Province: Birmingham
- Archdiocese: Birmingham
- Deanery: North Staffordshire

Our Lady of the Angels and St Peter in Chains Church or Our Lady and St Peter's Chains Church is a Roman Catholic Parish church in Stoke-on-Trent, Staffordshire. It is a grade II listed building with the adjacent presbytery.

It was built in 1857 and designed by Charles Hansom. It is situated on Hartshill Road close to the junction with Shelton Old Road, south of Queensway, in the centre of the city. It was founded as a church with an adjoining priory of Dominican nuns.

== History ==
=== Foundation ===
In 1838, a Roman Catholic mission from Longton was started in Stoke. In 1841, a chapel, named St Peter's Chains, was built on Back Glebe Street. In 1850, the chapel received its own priest. In early 1851, a group of Dominicans nuns moved into Longton. In 1854, with their lease in Longton ending, they moved to the site of the present church.

=== Construction ===
In 1856, building work began on the church and the adjoining convent for the Dominican nuns. To pay for the construction, the old chapel was sold. In 1857, the new church was opened and named Our Lady of the Angels and St Peter in Chains. The convent started a girls' school at the same site. From 1864 to 1865, the adjoining building was expanded to house a boarding school and St Margaret's Home for Incurables. In 1866, the convent was designated a priory.

=== Extensions ===
From 1884 to 1885, a new chancel was built. Its architect was A.E. Purdie, who also designed Kilworth House and the chapel at Rudding Park House.

Rev Dr James Northcote was parish priest at the church from 1857 to 1860 and then from 1881 to his death in 1907. In 1865, he also donated a series of Stations of the Cross from Belgium to the church. In 1905, an organ was installed. This was to commemorate the fiftieth anniversary of Northcote's priesthood.

== Parish ==
The church has Mass at the following times

Tuesdays : 9:30am

Wednesdays : 6:00pm

Thursdays : 9:30am

Fridays : 9:30am

Saturdays : 5:45pm

Sundays : 9:30am

== See also ==
- Roman Catholic Archdiocese of Birmingham
