= Tao Porchon-Lynch =

American yoga instructor (1918–2020)

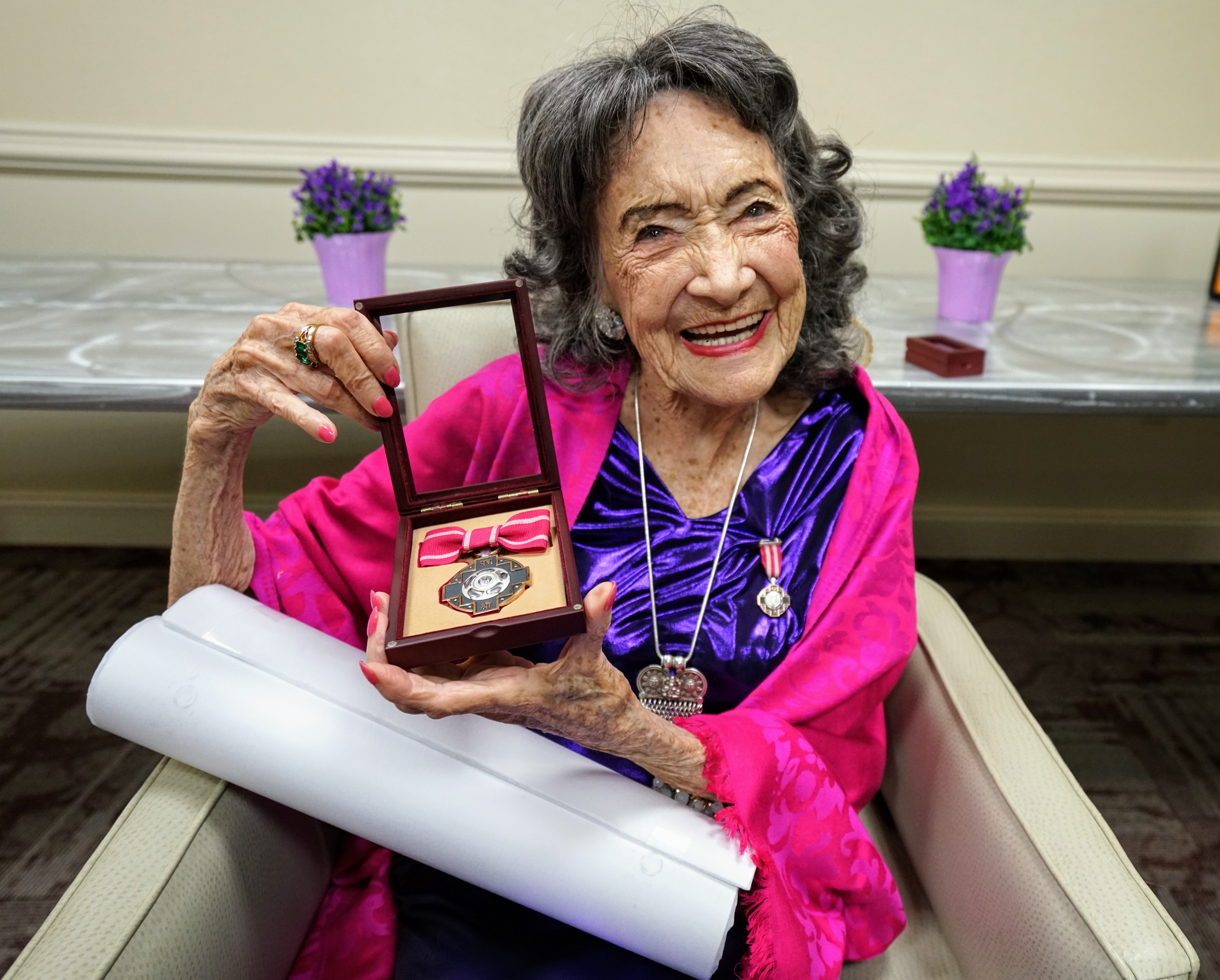
- Porchon-Lynch in 2019
- Born: Täo Andrée Porchon; August 13, 1918; The English Channel
- Died: February 21, 2020 (aged 101)
- Occupations: Yogi and competitive dancer
- Known for: Oldest yoga teacher
- Spouse: Bill Lynch (m. 1962; died 1982)

Tao Porchon-Lynch (born Täo Andrée Porchon; August 13, 1918 – February 21, 2020) was an American yoga master and award-winning author of French and Indian descent. She discovered yoga in 1926 when she was eight years old in India and studied with, among others, Sri Aurobindo, B.K.S. Iyengar, K. Pattabhi Jois, Swami Prabhavananda, and Maharishi Mahesh Yogi. At age 101, she taught a weekly class in New York, and led programs across the globe. She was the author of two books, including her autobiography, Dancing Light: The Spiritual Side of Being Through the Eyes of a Modern Yoga Master, which won a 2016 IPPY Award and three 2016 International Book Awards. In the front matter endorsement, Deepak Chopra said: "One of the most acclaimed yoga teachers of our century, Tao Porchon-Lynch... is a mentor to me who embodies the spirit of yoga and is an example of Ageless Body, Timeless Mind. Like yoga, she teaches us to let go and to have exquisite awareness in every moment."

She was the recipient of India's highly prestigious award Padma Shri in 2019 for her excellent work in the field of Yoga.

== Early life ==
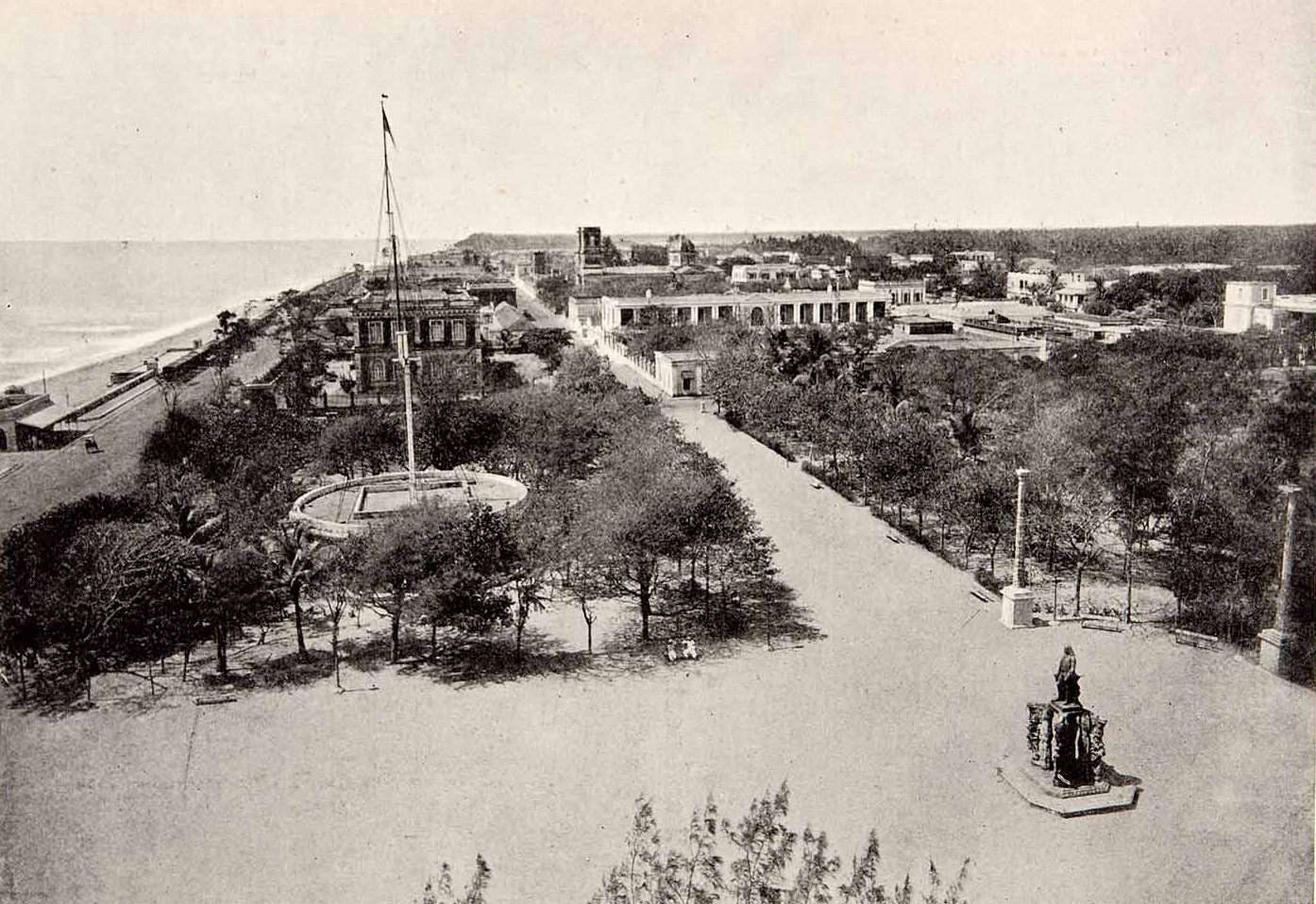
Pondicherry, where Tao first saw yoga being practised

Tao Porchon was born on August 13, 1918, on a ship in the middle of the English Channel, two months premature. Her father was from France, while her mother was Indian (Manipuri). Her mother died when Tao was seven months old and she was raised by her aunt and uncle. Her uncle, who designed railroads, often brought her along for trips around Asia, travelling as far as Singapore. The family owned vineyards in the wine region of the Rhône River Valley, located in Southern France.

At age eight, Tao witnessed a group of youthful yoga practitioners exercising on a beach in then French India, Pondicherry. This encounter got Porchon interested in yoga, who stated in an interview with Guinness World Records, "I wanted to do the amazing things that they were doing with their bodies." Going against the advice of her aunt, who remarked that yoga was meant predominantly for males, she started practising yoga, although she did not get involved in it professionally until much later in her life. In her youth, Porchon met the Indian nationalist Mahatma Gandhi, who was her uncle's close acquaintance, even marching with him on two separate occasions. She also participated in demonstrations with General Charles de Gaulle and Martin Luther King Jr.

== Career ==
=== Entertainment ===
In her early career, Porchon worked in the fashion industry. She found success as a model and won several titles, including "Best Legs in Europe". For a period of time she was signed under the Lever Brothers. She travelled around the globe modeling in such cities as Paris. During the Second World War, Porchon moved to London and became a cabaret performer under the mentorship of Noël Coward. Notable journalist Quentin Reynolds took note of Porchon, writing that she made a "dark London brighter".

After the war died down, she relocated to the United States, where she got a job as an actress under Metro-Goldwyn-Mayer, appearing in various Hollywood motion pictures, including The Thief of Bagdad, Show Boat (1951), also featuring Kathryn Grayson, and The Last Time I Saw Paris (1954). During her career as an actress, she frequently gave free yoga sessions to her fellow actors and actresses. She was also featured in the documentary If You're Not in the Obit, Eat Breakfast, a television film which premiered in 2017.

=== Professional yoga ===
Later on, Porchon-Lynch, now a married woman, found herself becoming more serious in yoga. Having studied with yoga greats Sri Aurobindo and Indra Devi, she abandoned her acting job in 1967, deciding to become a full-time yogi. Jack LaLanne was the first to hire her to teach yoga. In 1976, she became one of the founders of the Yoga Teachers Alliance, now known as the Yoga Teachers Association. She based her operations in New York and set up the Westchester Institute of Yoga in 1982, which now has students from all over the world. In 1995, with Indra Devi, she flew to Israel to attend the Yoga for Peace International Peace Conference. Porchon-Lynch has also been one of B. K. S. Iyengar's disciples in yoga and reportedly the first "foreign" student of his.

Porchon-Lynch has embraced her age and carried her yoga with her. She has mentioned, "I'm going to teach yoga until I can't breathe anymore." She received the Guinness World Records title of world's oldest yoga teacher from Berniece Bates in May 2012. Porchon-Lynch was 93 when she broke the world record. In 2013, in collaboration with Tara Stiles, she released a DVD on yoga, titled Yoga with Tao Porchon-Lynch. In addition, she published a book about meditation, titled Reflections: The Yogic Journey of Life.

== Other endeavors ==
Outside of yoga, Porchon-Lynch continued to involve herself in competitive dancing, particularly in ballroom tango. She had several hundred first-place titles in competitive dancing. Her youngest dance partners were Hayk Balasanyan, Vard Margaryan and Anton Bilozorov.

In 1967, Porchon-Lynch assisted in the establishment of the American Wine Society (AWS) with her spouse. When it split into different branches across the United States, she was selected in 1970 to be the Vice-President of the AWS in Southern New York. She also frequently appeared as part of the judging panel in various wine competitions. She later became the publisher and editor-in-chief of the wine appreciation magazine, The Beverage Communicator, distributed by the AWS. With her fellow yoga practitioners, Porchon-Lynch organized annual wine appreciation trips to France.

== Personal life ==
Porchon-Lynch grew up speaking French and Meiteilon. Thus, when she moved to North America, she experienced a language barrier, being unable to grasp the English language well, although she overcame the problem with sufficient practice. She was a close acquaintance of Hindi film actor Dev Anand. The duo were introduced to each other by Kamini Kaushal, who was also a friend of Porchon-Lynch. Porchon-Lynch married Bill Lynch around 1962 but became widowed after her husband died in 1982. The couple had no children. In her spare time, Porchon-Lynch enjoyed meditating. She was a pescatarian. In August 2014, she still drove her Smart car.

== Bibliography ==
- American Wine Society News. American Wine Society. 1987.
- Alan Gevinson (1997). Within Our Gates: Ethnicity in American Feature Films, 1911–1960. University of California Press. ISBN 978-0-520-20964-0.
- Genie James (2013). The Fountain of Truth: Outsmart Hype, False Hope, and Heredity to Recalibrate How You Age. HCI Books. ISBN 978-0-7573-1715-6.
- Sara Gilbert (2013). The Imperfect Environmentalist: A Practical Guide to Clearing Your Body, Detoxing Your Home, and Saving the Earth (Without Losing Your Mind). Random House Publishing Group. ISBN 978-0-345-53759-1.
- Porchon-Lynch, Tao; Kennedy, Janie Sykes; Kennedy, Teresa Kay-Aba (2015). Dancing Light: The Spiritual Side of Being Through the Eyes of a Modern Yoga Master. New York: Power Living Media. ISBN 978-1-942-51000-0.
