= Pioneer Total Abstinence Association =

Organisation of Roman Catholic teetotallers

The Pioneer Total Abstinence Association of the Sacred Heart (PTAA) is an international organisation for Catholic teetotalers based in Ireland. Its members are commonly called Pioneers. While not advocating legal prohibition, it requires its members to completely abstain from alcohol. It also encourages devotion to the Sacred Heart of Jesus as an aid to resisting the temptation of alcohol. Pioneers wear a lapel pin called a Pioneer pin with an image of the Sacred Heart, both to advertise the organisation and to alert others not to offer them alcohol. The association publishes a monthly magazine, The Pioneer.

== History ==
The PTAA was founded in 1898 by James Cullen, in response to widespread alcoholism among Irish Catholics as the earlier temperance movement of Father Mathew was fading from memory. In the 20th Century, the term Pioneer became synonymous with teetotalism among Irish Catholics, and the PTAA influenced public policy. In 1923, Eoin O'Duffy as Commissioner of the Garda Síochána (Civic Guard) encouraged members to join the PTAA, and allowed Gardaí to wear the Pioneer pin on their uniforms, in exemption to a general ban on symbols and adornments. The Irish Defence Forces also allow its personnel to wear the Pioneer pin on their uniforms, one of only two civilian symbols allowed to be worn in uniform, the other being the Fáinne. By 1948, the PTAA claimed 360,000 members. By 1949, it had members in Scotland and England, with 93,000 people attending a rally in Croke Park. In 1956, a Commission of Enquiry into the licensing laws in Éire was appointed by the Minister for Justice, James Everett; the PTAA nominated one of the 22 members, John K. Clear. Clear assented to the majority report of the commission, which favoured easing the (widely disregarded) restrictions on opening hours of public houses introduced in 1925, although the Catholic hierarchy subsequently opposed the resulting Act.

From the start, Fr. Cullen envisioned the Association functioning within a strictly regulated framework that emanated from a central administration. He founded the movement on the parish unit, with a spiritual director in charge of each centre's operations. A central council headquartered in Dublin was in charge of overall governance. Each centre had a president, secretary, treasurer, and four or more council members in addition to being a part of the central council. Fr. Cullen also established a strict agenda for meetings that included the reading of minutes and correspondence, the treasurer's report, membership applications, local and national temperance business, and prayers, the most crucial of which was the Heroic Offering. There was a two-year probationary term before full membership in the Association was awarded. The Association had an estimated 280,000 members by the end of 1914, and by the 1950s, that number had increased to about 500,000. There were Pioneer centres established across England, Scotland, the United States, Australia, South Africa, and Switzerland by 1918. One of the administrative responsibilities assigned by Fr. Cullen to the Sisters of Charity, North William Street, in 1899 was the selling of Pioneer pins, which provided the organisation with its first funding. The Sisters got a donation for the maintenance of their orphanage in exchange for their administrative assistance. However, this arrangement came to an end in 1944 when the Association acquired new premises on Upper Sherrard Street, Dublin City, due to issues with the distribution of Pioneer pins. In 1949, Pope Pius XII congratulated the PTAA on its 50th anniversary. Additional chapters of the Pioneers were also established in North America during the 1950s. For example, a branch was founded in Mobile, Alabama, in 1954. In 1959, Chapter 3212 was founded in Pittsburgh. As of 2017, the organisation was active in the Bronx, New York City. There were also Regional Committees functioning in cities such as Boston, Chicago, and New York City. In Britain, a Regional Committee was operative in London.

Notable politicians who were active in the organisation included Tomás Mac Giolla, Martin McGuinness, Patrick Lalor, Denis Gallagher, as well as SDLP politicians such as Eddie McGrady and John Hume. Figures from the world of sport included Mícheál Ó Muircheartaigh, Nicholas Rackard, Fred Cogley, Enda Colleran, and Seán Óg Ó Ceallacháin. Other figures, such as the traditional singer Eileen Donaghy and journalist Nuala O'Faolain were also members.

The organisation hosted a conference for its international membership in Blackrock, South Dublin, in 1985. In 1989, 50,000 members gathered at Knock, County Mayo, to celebrate the 'Holy Offering' prayer created by its founder. During a parliamentary debate in December 1998, Senator Denis Cregan praised the Pioneers, but he questioned if their rules and attitudes at the time were too rigid and if the badge was necessary, as, although he had "never taken a pint," he couldn't wear one because he had been a publican. Relating to this, Cregan remarked that "there are wrongs within the association." By the time of its centenary commemorations in 1999, the PTAA claimed 200,000 members in Ireland, and 300,000 elsewhere, mainly in Africa. Then president, Padraig Brady, acknowledged that the organisation had been through difficult periods in the past, but was growing once again. The commemoration, which took place in Croke Park, saw a message of support from Pope John Paul II delivered, with the president of the State, Mary McAleese, in attendance. The PTAA promoted abstaining from alcohol for the period of Lent amongst the general public in 2005. In 2007, the Irish Times reported that the PTAA's membership was in decline. Historian Diarmaid Ferriter highlighted the supposed inherent contradictions in a movement that had simultaneously organised large-scale events and rallies, while encouraging silent self-sacrifice. Ferriter viewed the decline of the Pioneer Association in Ireland within the larger context of social and religious change. A study published in 2011 found that, although individual members continued to find membership in the PTAA spiritually meaningful and a source of support from like-minded Catholics, there was considerable confusion and disagreement at an organisational level as to what the overall goals of the association were.

The organisation had been an apostolate of the Jesuits for approximately 120 years. However, it transitioned to a lay apostolate during 2015-2018 due to falling vocations for the Jesuits. In 2020, the Pioneer Total Abstinence Association asserted that 100,000 people across Ireland had made the personal commitment to abstain from alcohol, despite declining numbers. As of 2022, The Pioneer magazine was no longer available in print form. In 2024, Frances Egan was elected as the PTAA's first woman president. As of 2025, the association organises an annual pilgrimage to Knock.

== Activity ==
Roman Catholic children in Ireland who make their Confirmation (typically at the age of 11–12) are encouraged to promise, or "take the pledge", not to drink alcohol until they are at least 18 (the legal drinking age in Ireland). The PTAA is active in this drive, and encourages teenagers, particularly in religious-run secondary schools, to join the PTAA and "keep the pledge". In train with the growing secularisation of Irish society, members of the association are increasingly older people. Younger Catholics who choose not to drink alcohol are unlikely to belong to the PTAA.

The PTAA does not strive to simply stop people from drinking. It also aims to create opportunities for fun and social activities without the need for the presence of alcohol. It organises many competitions, such as table quizzes, Réadóirí (a talent competition; Réadóirí is the Irish word for Pioneers), and sports. Local centres (parishes or schools) compete in these competitions at regional (against local parishes), diocesan, provincial and all-Ireland level. The Pioneers also run two annual seminars, one for young pioneers (13–18), and one for older Pioneers (18+).

The Association issued an appeal for funds from its website in April 2011 in an effort to prevent closure because of the organisation's indebtedness.
