= If You're Not in the Obit, Eat Breakfast =

- Directed by: Danny Gold
- Written by: Danny Gold; Michael Mayhew
- Produced by: Danny Gold; Aimee Hyatt; Sheila Nevins; George Shapiro; Howard West
- Starring: Carl Reiner; Iris Apfel; Tony Bennett; Mel Brooks; Kirk Douglas; Fyvush Finkel; Norman Lear; Stan Lee; Jerry Seinfeld; Dick Van Dyke; Betty White
- Narrated by: Carl Reiner
- Cinematography: Harris Done; Larry Herbst; Matthew Wachsman; Chad Wilson
- Edited by: Michael Mayhew
- Music by: Ah2 Music Jeff Lippencott & Mark T. Williams
- Production companies: Shapiro/West Productions; Gold Entertainment Group
- Distributed by: HBO
- Release date: May 19, 2017
- Running time: 86 minutes
- Country: United States
- Language: English

If You're Not in the Obit, Eat Breakfast is a 2017 American documentary film directed by Danny Gold that premiered on May 19, 2017 on HBO.

== Premise ==
If You're Not in the Obit, Eat Breakfast follows Carl Reiner as he poses the question, "'What's the secret to living into your 90s – and loving every minute of it?' Reiner tracks down several celebrated nonagenarians, and a few others over 100, to show how the twilight years can truly be the happiest and most rewarding. Jerry Seinfeld — who's already reserved the stage at Caesar's Palace for his 100th birthday show — is also in the film, as is longevity expert Dan Buettner."

== Persons featured ==
- Carl Reiner
- Iris Apfel
- Tony Bennett
- Alan Bergman
- Mel Brooks
- Dan Buettner
- Kirk Douglas
- Irving Fields
- Fyvush Finkel
- Stan Harper
- Ida Keeling
- Norman Lear
- Stan Lee
- Jim "Pee Wee" Martin
- Patricia Morison
- Raymond Olivere
- Tao Porchon-Lynch
- Jerry Seinfeld
- George Shapiro
- Harriette Thompson
- Dick Van Dyke
- Betty White

== Production ==
On April 5, 2017, it was announced that HBO would premiere the documentary on June 5, 2017.

== Release ==
=== Marketing ===
On May 12, 2017, the official trailer for the documentary was released.

=== Premiere ===
On May 17, 2017, the film held its official premiere at the Samuel Goldwyn Theater in Los Angeles, California. A question-and-answer session moderated by Tom Bergeron was held after the screening that included Dick Van Dyke, Carl Reiner, Mel Brooks, and Norman Lear.

== Reception ==
=== Critical response ===
The film has been met with a positive response from critics since its premiere. On the review aggregation website Rotten Tomatoes, the series holds a 100% approval rating based on 6 reviews. Metacritic, which uses a weighted average, assigned the series a score of 81 out of 100 based on 4 critics, indicating "universal acclaim".

=== Awards and nominations ===
Award	Category	Nominee(s)	Result	Ref.
70th Primetime Creative Arts Emmy Awards	Outstanding Narrator	Carl Reiner	Nominated	
70th Primetime Creative Arts Emmy Awards	Outstanding Original Music and Lyrics	Alan Bergman, Marilyn Bergman, and Dave Grusin (for "Just Getting Started")	Nominated	
