= James Cullen (PTAA) =

Irish Catholic priest

James Aloysius Cullen (23 October 1841 New Ross County Wexford – 6 December 1921 Dublin) was an Irish Catholic priest who founded the Irish Messenger of the Sacred Heart and the Pioneer Total Abstinence Association (PTAA)

== Life ==
James Aloysius Cullen was born 23 October 1841 New Ross County Wexford and received his early schooling at the school of the Christian School Brothers in his native village before entering the Jesuit secondary school of Clongowes Wood College in 1856. Believing that Jesuits were involved only in educational work, in 1861 he chose to enter the seminary (St. Patrick's, Carlow College) for the diocese of Ferns for which he was ordained priest on 28 October 1864, in Carlow. He was appointed curate in Wexford, where he introduced the Christmascrib. From there, he was assigned in 1866 to Enniscorthy. It was there, Cullen first became concerned with men spending their money on drink. He worked with local businessmen to improve housing for boatmen carrying goods between Enniscorthy and Wexford.

He entered the Society of Jesus in 1881 and took his first vows at Milltown Park in 1883. After studies in Louvain, Belgium, he returned to Dublin, where, he served as vice-rector at Belvedere College. In 1884, he was appointed spiritual father at Belvedere, a position he retained for twenty years while also engaged in other ministry.

=== James Joyce ===
Cullen was founder and director of the Sodality of Our Lady at the college, which duties included counseling students. In 1896, James Joyce was elected Student Prefect of the Society. Although not officially an instructor, he impressed on them that "the Old Testament Hebrews were the spiritual fathers of Christianity". According to Neil R. Davison, the sermons in Chapter III of A Portrait of the Artist as a Young Man are modeled on those given by Cullen during a retreat held in 1897.

=== Apostleship of Prayer ===
In November 1887, Cullen was appointed director for Ireland of the Apostleship of Prayer, to spread devotion to the Sacred Heart. To that end, in 1888, he founded the Irish Messenger of the Sacred Heart, which he saw as a means to promote temperance, by presenting temperance as an expression of one's devotion to the Sacred Heart. Though primarily a vehicle for the promotion of devotion to the Sacred Heart, Cullen also utilized The Messenger for the propagation of devotion to Mary.

In February 1892, Cullen travelled to the Cape Colony of South Africa and kept a lengthy diary with a view to future articles in The Messenger. While there, he preached missions and gave retreats.

=== PTAA ===
In 1898 he founded the PTAA. An extremely devout, if rather gloomy, man, he was a good organiser, who worked with great energy over many years to perfect the institution he had created. In 1899 he returned to the Cape Colony, and gave a retreat, to a British regiment. In 1904, Cullen was transferred to Gardiner Street and removed from the editorship of The Messenger. He focused his efforts on the Pioneer League and built St Francis Xavier's Hall, where he organised drama societies, Irish language classes, debates and other activities to enrich the lives of the people. He was a supporter of the Gaelic League.

Cullen died in Dublin 6 December 1921.

== Sources ==
- Ferriter, Diarmaid (1998). A Nation of Extremes: the Pioneers in twentieth century Ireland. Dublin: Irish Academic Press. ISBN 0-7165-2623-9.
