= Charles Dolman =

British publisher of the Dublin Review

Charles Dolman (1807–1863) was the British publisher of the Dublin Review.

== Life ==
Born at Monmouth on 20 September 1807, he was the only son of Charles Dolman, a surgeon there, by his wife Mary Frances, daughter of Thomas Booker, a Catholic publisher in London. Charles's father died in the year of his birth. His widowed mother in 1818 married as her second husband Thomas Buckley.

Dolman was educated at the Benedictine college of St. Gregory's, Downside, near Bath. On leaving Downside he studied architecture for a while at Preston in Lancashire, under the guidance of Joseph Aloysius Hansom. He was invited by the Bookers to join their establishment at 61 New Bond Street. In 1840 he entered into partnership with his cousin, Thomas Booker, and the title of the firm became Booker & Dolman. Not long afterwards the property passed entirely into Dolman's possession.

In 1838 Charles Dolman started a new series of the Catholic Magazine, which came to a close in 1844. He also took over the Dublin Review in 1838. It made a loss, however, requiring a subsidy. Disagreement's over Dolman's wish for control of the publication led to the connection being severed, in 1844.

In March 1845 he established Dolman's Magazine, which continued until the end of 1849. His energies were then directed to the publication of upmarket works. Among these were Daniel Rock's Church of our Fathers, Kenelm Henry Digby's Broad Stone of Honour, and William Gideon Michael Jones Barker's Three Days of Wensleydale. In 1850 Dolman completed the publication of the fifth edition, in 10 volumes, of John Lingard's History of England, containing final corrections.

Dolman ran into money troubles. In 1858 he had exhausted all his capital, and tried to form his business into a limited liability company, called the Catholic Bookselling and Publishing Company. He then left for Paris, where, with the help of friends, he set up a small business at No. 64 Rue du Faubourg St. Honoré. His health gave way, and he died there on 31 December 1863.

== Family ==
On 12 January 1841 Dolman married Frances, daughter of James and Apollonia Coverdale of Ingatestone Hall in Essex, by whom he had an only son, the Very Rev. Charles Vincent Dolman of Hereford, canon of Newport. His widow died in her sixty-sixth year, on 2 March 1885, at Erith.

== Notes ==
Attribution

This article incorporates text from a publication now in the public domain: "Dolman, Charles". Dictionary of National Biography. London: Smith, Elder & Co. 1885–1900.
