= James Spencer Northcote =

English Catholic priest and writer

- Born: 26 May 1821; Feniton Court, England, British Empire
- Died: 3 March 1907 (aged 85); Stoke-upon-Trent, England, British Empire
- Occupations: Writer, Priest
- Children: 3 sons and daughters

James Spencer Northcote (26 May 1821 - 3 March 1907) was an English Catholic priest and writer. He served as president of St Mary's College, Oscott for seventeen years.

== Life ==
He was the second son of George Barons Northcote. Educated first at Ilmington Grammar School, he won in 1837 a scholarship at Corpus Christi College, Oxford, where he came under John Henry Newman's influence. In 1841 he became B.A., and in the following year married his cousin, Susannah Spencer Ruscombe Poole. They had three sons and three daughters.

Taking Anglican Orders in 1844 he accepted a curacy at Ilfracombe; but when his wife was received into the Catholic Church in 1845, he resigned his office. In 1846, he himself was converted, being received at Prior Park College, where he continued as a master for some time.

From 1847 to 1850, Northcote was in Italy, where he became acquainted with archaeologist Giovanni Battista de Rossi, and developed an intense interest in the archaeology of Christian Rome. He then settled in Clifton for a time, pursuing literary activities. In 1851, he undertook jointly with Edward Healy Thompson the editorship of the series of controversial pamphlets known as "The Clifton Tracts".

From June 1852 until September, 1854, he acted as editor of The Rambler, founded by his friend John Moore Capes. After his wife's death in 1853 he devoted himself to preparation for the priesthood, first under Newman at the Birmingham Oratory in Edgbaston, then at the Collegio Pio, Rome. On 29 July 1855, he was ordained priest at Stone, where his daughter had entered the novitiate.

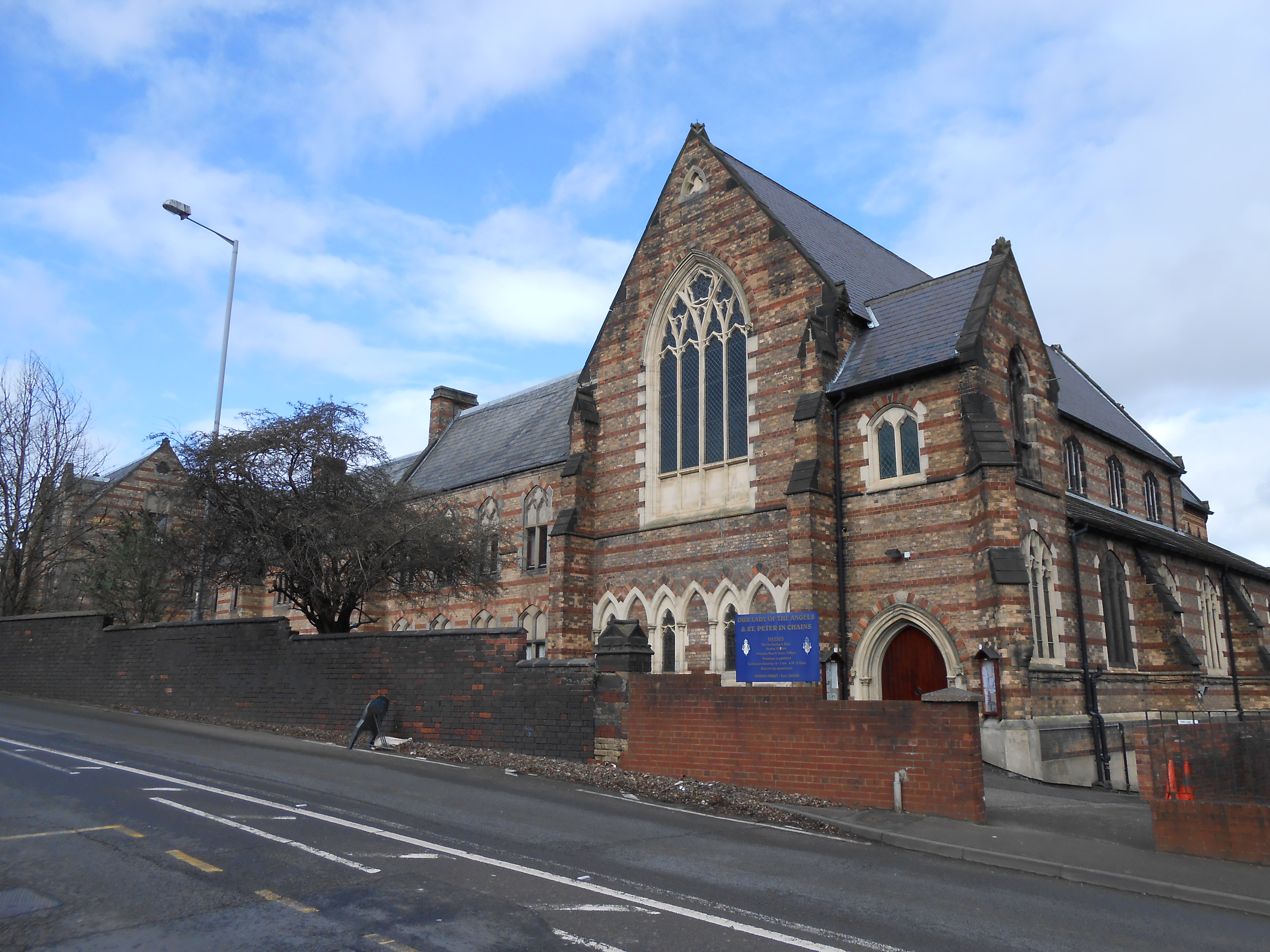
Our Lady of the Angels & St Peter in Chains, Stoke-on-Trent

He returned to Rome to complete his ecclesiastical studies, also acquiring the learning in Christian antiquities which was later to be enshrined in his major work, Roma Sotterranea. In 1857 he was appointed to the mission of Stoke-upon-Trent, which he served until 1860, when he was called to Oscott College as vice-president, and six months later became president, a position he held for seventeen years. He was made a canon of St Chad's Cathedral, Birmingham in 1861.

In 1865, Northcote donated Stations of the Cross, imported from Belgium, to his previous parish of Our Lady of the Angels and St Peter in Chains Church, Stoke-on-Trent.

Failing health caused him to resign in 1876, and he returned to the mission, first at Stone (1868), and then again at Our Lady of the Angels and St Peter in Chains Church, Stoke-on-Trent at Stoke-on-Trent (1881). In 1905 organ was erected at Our Lady of the Angels to commemorate the golden jubilee of Northcote's priesthood.

He had been made canon-theologian of the Diocese of Birmingham in 1862, and provost in 1885. In 1861, the pope conferred on him the doctorate in divinity.

The National Archives has copies of his correspondence with Newman, Acton, and others.

== Works ==
His scholarly works include the authoritative Roma Sotterranea; or an Account of the Roman Catacombs, Especially of the Cemetery of St. Callixtus, compiled from the works of Commendatore De Rossi (London, Longman, 1869; new expanded edition 1879), on the Catacombs of Rome, written in conjunction with William R. Brownlow, afterwards Bishop of Clifton.

Other works were:

- The Fourfold Difficulty of Anglicanism (Derby, 1846)
- A Pilgrimage to La Salett (London, 1852)
- The Roman Catacombs; or, some account of the Burial-Places of the Early Christians in Rome (London, 1857)
- Mary in the Gospels (London, 1867)
- Celebrated Sanctuaries of the Madonna (London, Longmans, 1868)
- A Visit to the Roman Catacombs (London, Burns & Oates, 1877)
- Epitaphs of the Catacombs; or Christian Inscriptions in Rome during the first four Centuries (London, Longman, 1878)
- "Clubs" (article), Encyclopaedia Britannica, Ninth and Tenth Editions (1875-89; 1902-03)

== Sources ==
- Barry, The Lord, my Light (funeral sermon, privately printed, 1907;
- Memoir of the Very Rev. Canon Northcote in The Oscotian (July, 1907);
- Report of the case of Fitzgerald v. Northcote (London, 1866).
