= Messenger of the Sacred Heart =

- Categories: Religion
- Frequency: Monthly
- Founded: 1888
- Company: Messenger Publications (Society of Jesus Ireland Province)
- Country: Ireland
- Based in: Dublin
- Language: English
- Website: www.messenger.ie/magazine/

The Messenger of the Sacred Heart is a Roman Catholic periodical; the print organ of the Apostleship of Prayer, a pious association founded in nineteenth century France by the Jesuits. There are many editions in various languages, promoting devotion to the Sacred Heart of Jesus. In the late 1940s, The Messenger was banned in many Soviet Bloc countries.

== History ==
The Messenger of the Sacred Heart was originally founded in France as the print organ of the Apostleship of Prayer, a pious association founded in 1844 by Francois-Xavier Gautrelet, S.J. The first Messenger of the Sacred Heart was published in 1861. The Apostleship of Prayer has always operated under the auspices of the Society of Jesus. By 1941, there were seventy-two Messengers around the world published in forty-four different languages. The English and the Australian Jesuits prepared their own editions. A children's edition was also produced.

=== English Messenger ===
William Maher SJ (1823-1877) translated and composed the words and music to the hymn Soul of My Saviour, among other hymns. Maher served as the editor of the English Messenger until his death in 1877. Henry James Coleridge then added the Messenger to his other duties as editor of The Month. In 1884, Coleridge was able to pass the editorship of "The Messenger" to Augustus Dignam SJ, who also happened to be spiritual adviser to Frances Margaret Taylor, the former publisher of The Lamp. Taylor was by then Mother Magdalen of the Sacred Heart and head of the Congregation of the Poor Servants of the Mother of God. A writer, in her own right, with her experience in publishing, she helped Dignam with "The Messenger".

=== Irish Messenger ===
Generally known simply as The Messenger, it was founded by Irish priest, Fr. James Cullen SJ in 1888. In November 1887, Cullen was appointed director for Ireland of the Apostleship of Prayer, to spread devotion to the Sacred Heart. Cullen had earlier served as a curate in Enniscorthy. The boatmen who carried goods between Enniscorthy and Wexford worked hard; it was there, Cullen first became concerned with men spending their money on drink. In 1888, he founded the Irish Messenger of the Sacred Heart which he saw as a means to promote temperance, by presenting temperance as an expression of one's devotion to the Sacred Heart. Though primarily a vehicle for the promotion of devotion to the Sacred Heart, Fr. Cullen also utilized the Messenger for the propagation of devotion to Mary. Helpful articles in the early days offered advice ranging from how to iron a blouse to the good rearing of hens. It is printed in Dublin. With sales of The Messenger around 52,000, it is still one of the largest-selling magazines in Ireland. Messenger Publications publishes the Journal Studies for the Irish Jesuit province.

=== Canadian Messenger ===
A Canadian version was launched in 1891 and published at the Jesuit seminary in Montreal until 1925, and thereafter in Toronto. The Canadian Messenger was a member of a family of Messengers published around the world by the Jesuits. The Messager Canadien du Sacre Coeur was published for French-speaking Canadians. Due to increased costs and declining subscribers, it ceased publication in June 2014.

In 1947, The Messenger was banned in Yugoslavia, Albania, Austria, Latvia, Lithuania, Poland and Bohemia and Ruthenia in Czechoslovakia
