= Daniel Rock =

English Roman Catholic priest, ecclesiologist and antiquarian (1799–1871)

Daniel Rock (31 August 1799, Liverpool – 28 November 1871 Kensington, London) was an English Roman Catholic priest, ecclesiologist and antiquarian.

He was educated at St. Edmund's College, Old Hall, where he studied from April, 1813, to December, 1818. There he came under the influence of Louis Havard from whom he acquired his first interest in liturgy, and was the intimate friend of Mark Aloysius Tierney. He was then chosen as one of the first students sent to reopen the English College at Rome, where he remained until he took the degree of D.D. in 1825. He had been ordained priest, 13 March 1824. On his return to London he became assistant priest at St. Mary's, Moorfields, until 1827, when he was appointed domestic chaplain to John Talbot, 16th Earl of Shrewsbury, with whom he had contracted a friendship based on similarity of tastes while at Rome. He accordingly resided at Alton Towers, Staffordshire, till 1840, with the exception of two years during which Shrewsbury's generosity enabled him to stay at Rome collecting materials for his great work, Hierurgia or the Holy Sacrifice of the Mass, which was published in 1833. He had previously published two short works: Transubstantiation vindicated from the strictures of the Rev. Maurice Jones (1830), and The Liturgy of the Mass and Common Vespers for Sundays (1832).

In 1840 he became chaplain to Sir Robert Throckmorton of Buckland (then in Berkshire, nowadays in Oxfordshire), and while there wrote his greatest book, The Church of Our Fathers, in which he studies the Sarum Rite and other medieval liturgical observances. This work, which has profoundly influenced liturgical study in England and which caused his recognition as the leading authority on the subject, was published in 1849 (vols. I and II) and 1853-4 (vol. III). After 1840, Rock was a prominent member of the Adelphi, an association of London priests who were working together for the restoration of the hierarchy. When this object was achieved, he was elected one of the first canons of Southwark (1852). Shortly after, he ceased parochial work, and having resided successfully at Newick, Surrey (1854–64), he went to live near the South Kensington Museum in which he took the keenest interest and to which he proved of much service. His Introduction to the Catalogue of Textile Fabrics in that Museum has been separately reprinted (1876) and is of great authority. He also contributed frequent articles to the Archæological Journal, the Dublin Review, and other periodicals. For many years before his death he held the position of President of the Old Brotherhood of the English Secular Clergy.
