= Michael Joseph Quin =

Irish author, traveller, journalist and editor

- Born: 1796; Thurles
- Died: 19 February 1843 (aged 46–47); Boulogne-sur-Mer
- Education: Trinity College, Dublin
- Known for: Dublin Review

Michael Joseph Quin (1796 – 19 February 1843) was an Irish author, traveller, journalist and editor. He is known as the originator of the Dublin Review.

== Life ==
He was the third son of Morty Quin a distiller. In 1811 although a Catholic, he entered Trinity College as a 'pensioner'. Coming to London he was called to the bar at Lincoln's Inn in 1818 and while waiting for practice devoted himself to journalism. For the Morning Herald he wrote an account of his experiences in Spain during the latter part of 1822 and the first four months of 1823, later published in book-form. In the following year he issued two translations, the memoirs of Ferdinand VII and a biography of Don Agustín de Iturbide. He became editor of the Monthly Review in 1825 and held that post for seven years. During this period he contributed many articles on foreign policy to the Morning Chronicle, and edited The Catholic Journal, a weekly newspaper which ran for one year only. Further travels in Hungary, Wallachia, Serbia, and Turkey furnished him with material for a new book in 1835, called A Steam Voyage down the Danube, which was so successful that it was translated into French and German.

But his most lasting work was the Dublin Review, the leading Catholic periodical in the British Isles in his time. Of its first beginnings Cardinal Wiseman wrote: "It was in 1836 that the idea of commencing a Catholic Quarterly was first conceived by the late learned and excellent Mr. Quin, who applied to the illustrious O'Connell and myself to join in the undertaking". Quin became the editor and chief contributor, writing five articles in the first number and four in the second. But the enterprise was not remunerative. After two numbers he resigned the editorship, being unable to devote so much time and trouble without financial advantage, but continued to contribute articles to succeeding issues.

During 1842 he edited The Tablet, pending the disputes between Lucas and the publishers. He married a step-daughter of Edward Wallis of Burton Grange, York, and had three daughters by her.

He died of disease of the lungs. His body was interred in the cemetery of the English at Boulogne-sur-Mer.

== Works (selection) ==
- A Visit to Spain (1823)
- Memoirs of Ferdinand VII, 8 volumes (1824)
- A Statement of some of the principal events in the public life of Don Agustín de Iturbide (1824)
- The Trade of Banking in England (1833)
- A pamphlet on the proposed abolition of local probate courts (1834)
- A Steam Voyage down the Danube (1836)
- Journey Through Arabia Petræa to Mount Sinai and the Excavated City of Petra (1836) translated from the French of Léon de Laborde
- Nourmahal, an Oriental Romance, 2 volumes (1838)
- Steam Voyages on the Seine, the Moselle and the Rhine (1843)
