= Mark Aloysius Tierney =

English Catholic historian

Mark Aloysius Tierney (September 1795 in Brighton – 19 February 1862 at Arundel) was an English Catholic historian.

== Life ==
After his early schooling under the direction of the Franciscans in Baddesley Green, Warwickshire, he was educated at St. Edmund's College, old Hall, which he entered in 1810 and where he was ordained priest, 19 Sept., 1818. He remained at the college as professor and procurator in 1818-19. He then served as assistant priest in Warwick Street, London, and afterwards at Lincoln's Inn Fields until his ill-health necessitated his removal to the country mission of Slindon in Sussex. In 1824 he was appointed chaplain to the Duke of Norfolk at Arundel, where he spent the rest of his life, devoting himself to historical and antiquarian studies.

His chief object was to bring out a new edition of Dodd's Church History of England, which was to incorporate documents collected by himself and John Kirk. The first volume appeared in 1839, but on the publication of the fifth volume in 1843 the work was discontinued, as the revival of the history of the seventeenth-century disputes between seculars and regulars was thought inopportune and gave offence. Meanwhile, his position as an antiquarian had received public recognition, for in 1833 he was elected a Fellow of the Society of Antiquaries of London and in 1841 a Fellow of the Royal Society. He also acted as Secretary to the Sussex Archaeological Society. After the restoration of the Catholic hierarchy in England and Wales, he became the first Canon Penitentiary of the Diocese of Southwark, having long been a member of the Old Chapter.

Shortly afterwards, his relations with Cardinal Nicholas Wiseman, whose policy he disliked and mistrusted, became very strained. Arising out of Tierney's biographical sketch of John Lingard, a controversy began between them on the then well-known question as to whether Lingard had been created a cardinal in petto, by Leo XII, and Cardinal Wiseman addressed to his chapter a letter complaining of Tierney's criticism of his Recollections of the last Four Popes. In answer to this Tierney wrote the Reply to Cardinal Wiseman's Letter to his Chapter (1858), which was not 'published', though it was printed. He also wrote The History and Antiquities of the Castle of Arundel (London, 1834) and several controversial pamphlets. For a time he acted as editor of the Dublin Review, succeeding Michael Joseph Quin, the first editor.

Tierney died at Arundel on 19 February 1862.

== Publications ==
- A sermon on the conduct to be pursued by Catholics in their intercourse with their Protestant neighbours : preached at the opening of the Catholic chapel of St. Joseph, in Southampton, on ... Oct. 28, 1830 (Southampton: Published by I. Fletcher ..., 1830).
- Notices of a recent excavation in the college chapel at Arundel (London, 1834; 1851)
- The History and Antiquities of the Castle and Town of Arundel, Including the Biography of Its Earls, from the Conquest to the Present Time (London: G. and W. Nicol, 1834).
- Dodd's Church History of England from the Commencement of the Sixteenth Century to the Revolution in 1688. With Notes, Additions and a Continuation ...: General history. Henry VIII. Appendix (London: C. Dolman, 1839).
- A Letter to the Very Rev. G. Chandler, Dean of Chichester, containing some remarks on his sermon preached ... "on the occasion of publicly receiving into the Church a Convert from the Church of Rome." (London: C. Dolman 1844).

== Sources ==
- Mark Antony Lower, Worthies of Sussex (Lewes, 1865), 341.
- Bernard Ward, Hist. of St. Edmund's College (London, 1893).
- J. A. H(amilton), "Tierney, Mark Aloysius (1795-1862)," Dictionary of National Biography (ed. Sidney Lee) Vol. LVI: Teach-Tollet (London: Smith Elder 1898), pp. 386–387 (from which the Catholic Encyclopedia article is drawn).
- Bernard Ward, The Eve of Catholic Emancipation, III (London, 1912), appendix .
- Wilfrid Philip Ward, Life of Cardinal Wiseman (London, 1897).
- Joseph Gillow (editor), Biographical and Bibliographical Dictionary of the English Catholics, s.v
- Brian Fothergill, Nicholas Wiseman (London: Faber & Faber, 2013).
