= Harriet Diana Thompson =

Harriet Diana Thompson, née Calvert (1811–1896) was a Victorian writer, best known for her Life of St Charles Borromeo.

== Life ==
Harriet was born at Hunsdon, Hertfordshire, the daughter of Nicholson Calvert and Frances Pery, daughter and co-heir of the Viscount Pery.

On 30 July 1844, she married the Anglican clergyman Edward Healy Thompson at Marylebone. On her husband's conversion to Catholicism in 1846, she also joined the Catholic Church. She wrote biographies, histories and novels on Catholic subjects, and articles for the Dublin Review. Her stories of Catholic life won considerable popularity. She died at Pery Lodge, Cheltenham, Gloucestershire, 21 August 1896.

== Writings ==
- Mary, Star of the Sea (1848)
- The Witch of Malton Hill (1850)
- Mount St. Lawrence (1850)
- Winefride Jones (1854)
- Margaret Danvers (1857)
- The Life of St Charles Borromeo (1858)
- Bertrand du Guesclin: The Hero of Chivalry (1858)
- The Tyrolese Patriots of 1809 (1859)
- The Wyndham Family: A Story of Modern Life (1876)
