= The Month =

British Jesuit magazine (1864–2001)

- Editor: Frances Margaret Taylor (first)
- Categories: Religion, social issues, literature, culture
- Frequency: monthly (sometimes with double issues for July/August and November/December), bimonthly 1941-1946.
- Publisher: English Province of the Society of Jesus
- Founded: 1864
- Final issue: 2001
- Company: Month Publications (1960-2001)
- Country: England
- Language: English
- ISSN: 0027-0172

The Month was a monthly review, published from 1864 to 2001, which, for almost all of its history, was owned by the English Province of the Society of Jesus and was edited by its members.

== History ==
The Month, founded and edited by Frances Margaret Taylor, began publication in July 1864 with the subtitle "An illustrated magazine of literature, science and art". Much of its space was given to fiction and the lighter forms of literature. In April 1865 she sold the review to the Jesuits, who changed the subtitle to "A magazine and review" (1865–1873). The first Jesuit-appointed editor was Henry James Coleridge, who managed to elicit contributions from many of the leading figures in English Catholicism, including John Henry Newman, whose "Dream of Gerontius" was first published in The Month. The publisher throughout these years was Simpkin, Marshall & Co. In 1874 the Catholic Review was incorporated, and the title became The Month and Catholic Review.

The years 1881–1882 saw the arrival of a new editor, Richard Frederick Clarke; a new publisher, Burns & Oates (until 1912); and the simplification of the title to The Month.

The review languished somewhat in the first half of the 20th century, and publication was reduced to bimonthly in the years 1941–1946, but it revived under the editorship (1948–1963) of Philip Caraman, who "changed the print, the layout, the cover design, and anything else that enhanced the quality of the magazine. He employed distinguished writers, such as Evelyn Waugh, Graham Greene, Edith Sitwell, Muriel Spark, and the American Trappist monk, Thomas Merton."

In 1969 The Month absorbed the Dublin Review, and at some point about that time the full title became The Month: A Review of Christian Thought and World Affairs.

From 1912 to 1960 the review was published by Longmans, Green, & Co. and thereafter by Month Publications.

Publication ceased in 2001, after negotiations for the Saint Austin Press to buy the magazine fell through.

== List of editors ==
- Frances Margaret Taylor, 1864–1865
- Henry James Coleridge, 1865–1881
- Richard Frederick Clarke, 1882–1894
- John Gerard, 1894–1897
- Sydney Fenn Smith, 1897–1901
- John Gerard, 1901–1912
- Joseph Keating, 1912–1939
- John Murray, 1939–1948
- Philip Caraman, 1948–1963
- Ronald Moffat, 1963–1967
- Peter Hebblethwaite, 1967–1974
- Michael Walsh, 1974–1975
- Hugh Kay, 1976-1986
- John McDade, 1986–1995
- Tim Noble, 1995–2001

== See also ==
- Thinking Faith
