= Henry Formby =

Henry Formby (born 1816; died at Normanton Hall, Thurlaston, Leicestershire, 12 March 1884) was an English Roman Catholic priest and writer.

== Life ==
Henry Formby was educated at Clitheroe Grammar School, the Charterhouse School, London, and Brasenose College, Oxford, where he was awarded an M.A. Having received Anglican orders, he became vicar of Ruardean in Gloucestershire, where in 1843 he completed his first book, A Visit to the East, and he showed the interest in ecclesiastical music that always characterized him in a pamphlet reprinted from the English Churchman called "Parochial Psalmody Considered" (1845).

At this time he was profoundly influenced by the Oxford Movement, and soon after his friend John Henry Newman had become a Catholic, he himself decided to resign his living and enter the Catholic Church. His reception took place on 24 January 1846, at Oscott, where he continued studying theology till he was ordained a priest on 18 September 1847.

He was attached to St Chad's Cathedral, Birmingham.

== Works ==
He published three works on plain chant:

- "The Catholic Christian's Guide to the Right Use of Christian Psalmody of the Psalter" (1847);
- "The Plain Chant the Image and Symbol of the Humanity of the Divine Redeemer and the Blessed Virgin Mary" (1848); and
- "The Roman Ritual and Its Canto Fermo, Compared with the Works of Modem Music, in Point of Efficiency and General Fitness for the Purpose of the Catholic Church" (1849).

He also published "The Young Singer's Book of Songs" (1852), "School Songs and Poetry to Which Music Is Adapted" (1852), and he was one of the editors of the "First Series of Hymns and Songs for the Use of Catholic Schools and Families" (1853). Other works belonging to this period were: "The Duties and Happiness of Domestic Service" (1851), "The March of Intellect; or, The Alleged Hostility of the Catholic Church to the Diffusion of Knowledge Examined" (1852), and "State Rationalism in Education; An Examination into the Actual Working and Results of the System of the Board of Commissioners of National Education in Ireland" (1854).

Besides his interest in ecclesiastical music, he published a series of illustrated books, including his "Pictorial Bible and Church History Stories", which began with "Pictorial Bible Stories for the Young" (1856). An edition of the complete work was published in 1857, followed by another in three volumes with new illustrations in 1862, and an abridged one-volume edition in 1871.

From 1857 to 1864 he took charge of the mission at Wednesbury; during which time he published "The Fifteen Mysteries of the Rosary" (1857), "The Life of St. Benedict" (1858), "The Parables of Our Lord Jesus Christ" (1858), "The Life of St. Patrick" (1862), all of which were illustrated. A sermon on "Our Lady of Salette" (1857) and "The Inquiry of a Retired Citizen into the Truth of the Catholic Religion" (1863) were also published while he was at Wednesbury.

In 1864 he retired from active missionary work and withdrew to the Dominican priory at Hinckley in Leicestershire, where he spent the remaining twenty years of his life in issuing books and pamphlets and in helping to train the novices; For some years he edited The Monthly Magazine of the Holy Rosary. His later publications included:

- "The Cause of Poor Catholic Emigrants Pleaded" (1867);
- "Fleury's Historical Catechism continued to the Vatican Council" (1871);
- "The Book of the Holy Rosary" (1872);
- "De Annis Christi Tractatus" (1872);
- "Sacrum Septenarium" (1874);
- "The Children's Forget-me-not" (1877);
- "Compendium of the Philosophy of Ancient History";
- "Little Book of the Martyrs of the City of Rome" (1877);
- "Five Lectures on the City of Rome" (1877);
- "Monotheism ... the primitive Religion of the City of Rome" (1877);
- "Ancient Rome and Its Connection with Christian Religion" (Part I, 1880; Part II, unfinished at his death);
- "The Growing Unbelief of the Educated Classes" (1880);
- "The Divine Gift of the Sacred Scriptures" (1881);
- "Safeguards of Divine Faith in the Presence of Sceptics, Atheists, and Free-thinkers" (1882);
- "A Familiar Study of the Sacred Scripture", his last work.

He also wrote other devotional and educational books and a recollection from a journey, printed in 1843, called A Visit to the East.

== Family ==
His father, Henry Grenehalgh Formby, was the second son of Richard Formby of Formby Hall, Lancashire. The family had been Catholic until the eighteenth century, when, with the exception of a younger branch, they lost their Catholic faith and closed the chapel of their fifteenth-century mansion.
