= Harriette Thompson =

American classical pianist and marathon runner

Harriette Thompson (27 March 1923 – 16 October 2017) was an American classical pianist who later held the record for the oldest woman to run a marathon, at age 92, and also the oldest woman to complete a half-marathon, at 94.

She is featured in the 2017 HBO documentary If You're Not in the Obit, Eat Breakfast.
