= Lady Georgiana Fullerton =

English novelist (1812–1885)

Lady Georgiana Fullerton TOSF
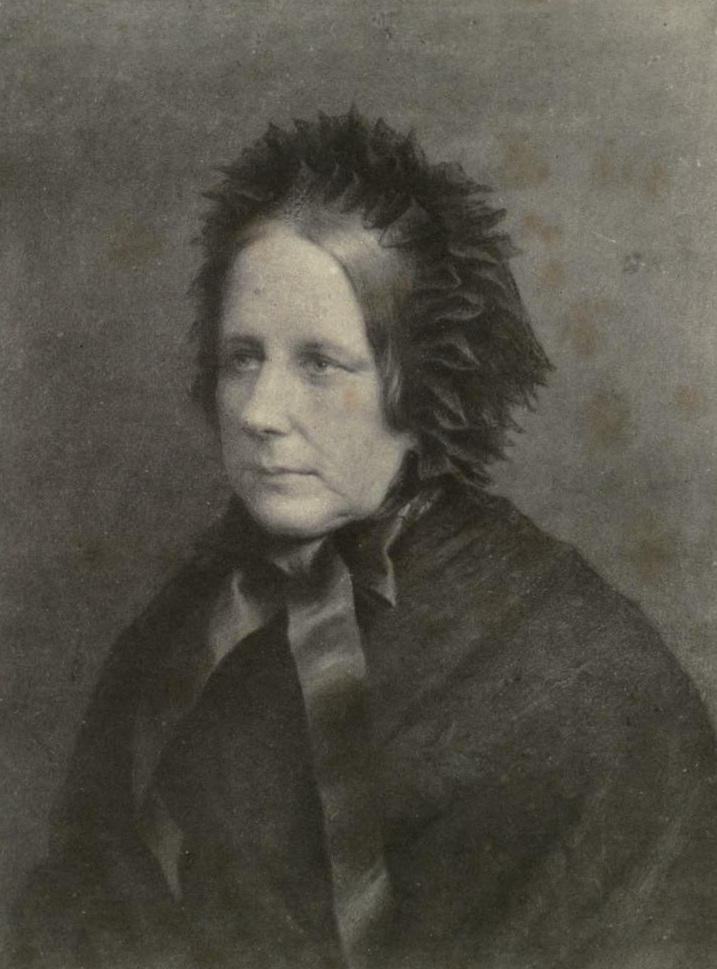
- Born: Georgiana Charlotte Leveson-Gower; 23 September 1812; Staffordshire, England
- Died: 19 January 1885 (aged 72); Bournemouth, England
- Occupations: Novelist; philanthropist
- Spouse: Alexander George Fullerton (m. 1833)
- Children: 1
- Parents: Granville Leveson-Gower, 1st Earl Granville (father); Harriet Leveson-Gower, Countess Granville (mother)

Lady Georgiana Fullerton (née Leveson-Gower; 23 September 1812 – 19 January 1885) was an English novelist, philanthropist, biographer, and school founder. She was born into a noble political family. She was one of the foremost Roman Catholic novelists writing in England during the nineteenth century.

== Biography ==
Lady Georgiana Fullerton, born as Lady Georgiana Charlotte Leveson-Gower, was born at home in Tixall Hall, Staffordshire, England. She was the second daughter of Lord Granville Leveson-Gower, the first Earl of Granville, and Lady Harriet Elizabeth Cavendish. She was baptized in the Anglican faith on 10 October 1812, in Tixall Hall, where her family was staying at the time.

For many of her younger years, she resided in Paris, where her father served as the English ambassador. While there she had occasion to take piano lessons from a young Franz Liszt.

=== Marriage and conversion ===
On 13 July 1833, Lady Georgiana married embassy attaché Alexander George Fullerton, in Paris. She and her husband left Paris 8 years later, when her father retired from the embassy. They lived in Rome for a few years, where her husband converted to Roman Catholicism. She followed in his footsteps and was received into the Roman Catholic Church on Passion Sunday, 29 March 1846 in London.

In London, she joined Margaret Radclyffe Livingstone Eyre and Cecil Chetwynd Kerr, Marchioness of Lothian who, like her, were recent aristocratic converts to Catholicism. The three of them were a known source of Catholic philanthropy.

In 1855, her only son died at the age of 21, overwhelming her with grief and throwing her and her husband into a permanent state of mourning. After the loss of her only son, she devoted herself to works of philanthropy and charity. In 1856, she adopted the Franciscan tradition by enrolling herself in the Third Order of Saint Francis. At the time of the 1861 England Census, she, her husband, and eleven servants lived at 27 Chapel St in the fashionable St. George Hanover Square, Mayfair, London.

=== Charitable work ===
The Fullerton residence in Sussex was the center of her charitable works, which include her efforts to bring the sisters of St. Vincent of Paul to England. In 1872, she assisted in the founding of Frances Margaret Taylor's school and religious community Poor Servants of the Mother of God Incarnate in which she served as the benefactor.

=== Death ===
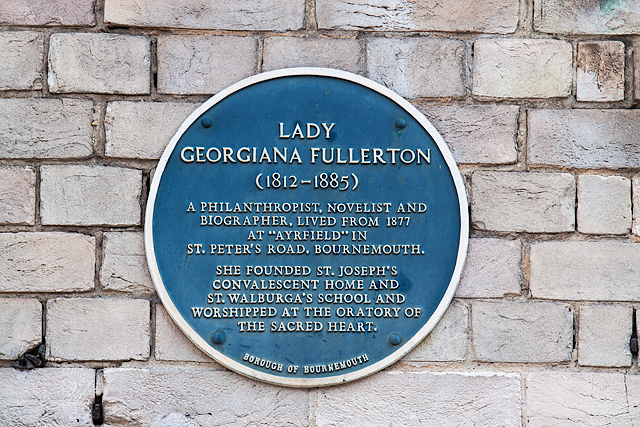
Plaque honoring Fullerton on the Sacred Heart Church in Bournemouth.

Three years later, she moved for the final time with her husband and eight servants to Bournemouth, into their home called Ayrfield, Gervis Road in which she died on 19 January 1885. Her remains are in the Cemetery of the Sacred Heart, Roehampton. Following her death, Madame, Augustus Craven (née La Ferronays) published a work titled Lady Georgiana Fullerton, sa Vie et ses Œuvres, documenting Fullerton's philanthropic work.

A Blue Plaque commemorating her charitable activities can be found on the Sacred Heart Church in Bournemouth.

== Publications ==
Lady Georgiana Fullerton published roughly a dozen novels and biographies on religious, historical, and romantic themes between the years 1844–1883. Most of her publications were novels, but she did publish two volumes of verse. Occasionally, Fullerton translated the works of other authors, such as The Notary's Daughter, a Tale from the French of Madame Léonie d'Aulney (1878).

She began her writing career when she was 32, publishing her first novel, Ellen Middleton: A Tale in three volumes in July 1844. Her own brother, Lord Brougham, and Charles Cavendish Fulke Greville, commended her work. The novel contained no illustrations, which was unusual for the period.

She published her second novel, Grantley Manor, in 1847, following her conversion to Catholicism. This novel contained a more advanced style of writing compared to her first. Her most popular novel was Too Strange not to Be True, which was published in 1864. The novel described the life of a poverty stricken French emigrant fighting for survival in the Canadian wilderness.

Her other works include:

- The Old Highlander, the Ruins of Strata Florida, and Other Verses (1849)
- Lady Bird (1852)
- Life of St. Francis of Rome (1855)
- La Comtesse de Bonneval (1857)
- Rose Leblanc (1861)
- Laurentia, A Tale of Japan (1861)
- Constance Sherwood: An Autobiography of the Sixteenth Century (1865)
- Life of the Marchessa G. Falletti di Baroto (1866)
- A Stormy Life (1867)
- The Helpers of the Holy Souls (1868)
- Mrs. Gerald's Niece (1869)
- The Gold-digger and Other Verses (1872)
- Life of Louisa de Carvajal (1873)
- Seven Stories (1873)
- Rosemary; a Tale of the Fire of London (1874)
- Sketch of the Life of the Late Father Henry Young, of Dublin (1874)
- A Will and a way (1881)
- Life of Elizabeth Lady Farkland (1883)
- A Stormy Life: Queen Margaret's Journal, a Novel (1885)

== Reception ==
In a margin note in his copy of Ellen Middleton, a psychological tale of a woman who carries the guilty secret that her brief act of violence resulted in a child's accidental death, American author Edgar Allan Poe wrote: "A remarkable work, and one which I find much difficulty in admitting to be the composition of a woman. Not that many good and glorious things have not been the composition of women – but, because, here, the severe precision of style, the thoroughness, and the luminousness, are points never observable, in even the most admirable of their writings."

Like most critics, Fraser's Magazine responded approvingly in 1844 to Fullerton's first effort: "To say of Ellen Middleton that it evinces extraordinary talent in the writer, would be to make use of language which is quite inappropriate to the occasion. It is not talent, but power – marvelous power over the deeper feelings of the human heart, which these burning pages set forth."

Responding in October 1847 to Fullerton's second novel Grantley Manor, about a Protestant husband and Catholic wife unable to live together openly due to his father's prejudice against Catholicism, the reviewer for The New Monthly Belle Assemblée castigated her for her rejection of Anglicanism in favor of "Romish glories," commenting, "It is all very well, Lady Georgiana Fullerton, to expel the sin of bigotry, and the falsehood of those rampant Calvinists, who teach children that the Pope is the devil without his horns. We know there are many excellent Christians in that other faith, though it be full of pitfalls...but we do not see either profit or pleasure in the task of illuminating with the pictures of your genius the dull old missal which has been forgotten in England since the glorious Reformation."
