= Frances Margaret Taylor =

British writer

Venerable Mary Magdalen of the Sacred Heart SMG
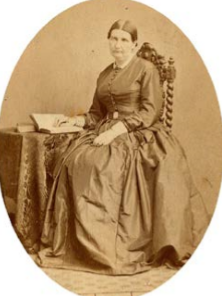
- Born: 20 January 1832; Stoke Rochford, Lincolnshire, England
- Died: 9 June 1900 (aged 68); London, England

Frances Margaret Taylor, religious name Mary Magdalen of the Sacred Heart (20 January 1832 – 9 June 1900) was an English religious sister and founder of the congregation of the Poor Servants of the Mother of God.

== Early life ==
Frances Taylor was born in Stoke Rochford, the youngest of ten children of Henry Taylor (1777–1842), Anglican Rector of a rural Lincolnshire parish, and his wife Louisa Maria Jones (1793–1869). Her paternal grandfather Richard Taylor (fl.1745–1829) had been rector of parishes in Wiltshire and Hampshire. On her mother's side, her family were merchants and shopkeepers in the City of London. Her father, a graduate of Lincoln College, Oxford, had been a curate at St Mary Abbots, Kensington, where in 1816 he married. His final appointment was to Stoke Rochford in 1824, where he was instituted by his patron, the vicar of Kensington, Thomas Rennell, whose High Church sympathies he shared.

Following Henry's death, the family returned to London in reduced circumstances, but Louisa rejected a suggestion that Frances be sent to a clergy orphan school. The family shortly moved to Brompton, London, where Frances and her elder sisters encountered the Tractarian spirit and teaching at Holy Trinity Brompton Church. A few years later, the family moved to St John's Wood, and later to the vicinity of Regent's Park, possibly to be nearer to Christ Church, Albany Street, then one of London's leading Tractarian churches. The Holy Cross sisters of Park Village were nearby, the first congregation to be established in the Church of England since the Protestant Reformation.

Frances developed a desire to serve the poor and vulnerable of London. In 1849 she made an abortive application to become a member of St John's House, based in Fitzroy Square, a nursing school which also functioned as an Anglican religious community. In 1848 her sisters Emma and Charlotte had joined an Anglican sisterhood, the Sisters of Mercy of the Holy Trinity founded by Priscilla Lydia Sellon. Frances followed suit around 1852, as a "visitor", and she appears to have stayed for two years. She was involved in nurse training and hospital work at Bristol, and she appears to have served as a nurse in Plymouth during the cholera epidemic of 1853. By that time, like her sister Charlotte, she had come to realise that her vocation lay elsewhere.

== Conversion and early years as a Catholic ==
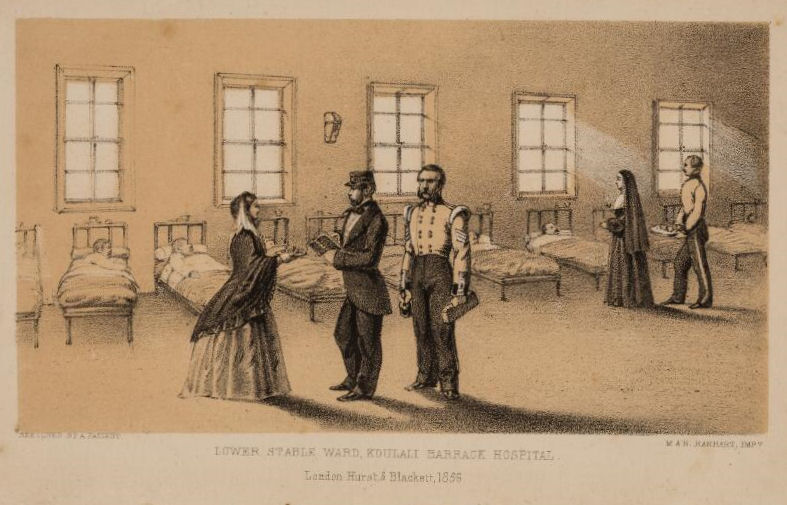
Lithograph of the Lower Stable Ward at Koulali Barrack Hospital in the Crimea (1856)

In March 1854 the Crimean War broke out. Frances volunteered to nurse in the military hospitals in Turkey. Though under age she was accepted for the second party of volunteer nurses which went out in December 1854, being joined there by her sister Charlotte in April 1855.

She nursed briefly with Florence Nightingale at Scutari Hospital, though she was critical of the organisation (particularly of supplies at the hospital) and she shortly moved to another military hospital at Koulali. There she encountered Mary Francis Bridgeman and the Sisters of Mercy and the stoical Irish Catholic soldiery. In the poor conditions of the military hospitals, Frances sought the counsel of the priest Sydney Woollett, who was assisting the Catholic chaplain William Ronan. She was received into the Roman Catholic Church by Woollett on 14 April 1855.

Frances Margaret Taylor in the Crimea

Her wartime experiences appeared as her first book. It was one of the earliest published eye-witness accounts of the military hospitals. The book in its final edition (1857) included an impassioned appeal for reform of the public nursing system, and in general of the treatment of the poor by contemporary society.

The delicate watercolour portrait of Frances Taylor as a nurse, by an unknown artist (left), has been much reproduced and copied. On her return to England, Frances put herself under the direction of Henry Edward Manning, rector of St Mary of the Angels, Bayswater. Manning introduced Frances to Catholic charitable organisations, allowing her to work with the London poor as she desired.

Lady Georgiana Fullerton (1812–1885) was to have a great influence on Frances' life, encouraging and assisting with her literary and charitable work. They first met c.1859 following the publication of Frances' first and most popular historical novel Tyborne, a story of the Catholic recusant martyrs of the sixteenth century. Between the years 1859 and 1866, Frances made determined efforts to find a religious vocation, including time spent with the Daughters of Charity in Paris and the Filles de Marie (Daughters of the Heart of Mary) in England.

== The Lamp ==
The price of most periodicals put them beyond the reach of tens of thousands of Catholic workers. To supply them with a penny magazine, in 1846 Thomas Earnshaw Bradley founded The Lamp. Bradley urged Catholics to gain an education, emphasizing science as means for Catholic to improve their lot. He printed articles about the steam engine, the telegraph, and the lightning rod. He also gave much of its space to Catholic fiction, descriptive articles, and the like, and ventured on an occasional illustration, a portrait or a picture of a new church; but it also supplied news and reported in full Wiseman's lectures and other notable Catholic utterances. For years it struggled with lack of capital, and for awhile Bradley edited his paper from his room in the debtors' prison at York. His name deserves honourable record as the pioneer of the popular Catholic Press.

In January 1863, Taylor became proprietor and editor of The Lamp, a position she retained until June 1871. It had for some years a prosperous existence as a popular magazine. Fathers Rawes and Caswall, Lady Georgiana Fullerton, Miss Drane, and Cecilia Caddell were among its contributors.

== Founding of the Poor Servants of the Mother of God ==
At this time, her spiritual director was the Jesuit Peter Gallwey. Around 1865–1867, with the support of Manning and James Clare, rector of the Jesuit Church, Farm Street, Frances visited Ireland to study Catholic charitable institutions, partly to better assist Irish emigrants in England. This visit resulted in one of her most important literary works, Irish Homes and Irish Hearts (1867), a state-of-the-nation work on contemporary Ireland.

In 1867 Lady Georgiana Fullerton translated the rule of the Little Servant Sisters of the Immaculate Conception, a rural Polish congregation. She obtained permission from the founder, Edmund Bojanowski, to establish the congregation in England. On 24 October 1868, with the help of J. L. Biemans, a Belgian priest working in the Saffron Hill area of London, Frances Taylor took charge of a putative English branch of this congregation. In February 1869, at the invitation of the order of priests, the Oblates of Mary Immaculate, the community moved to the Catholic mission at Tower Hill, where their ministry included running an industrial school and soup kitchen. It was at that stage, following the death of her mother, that Frances was able to become a permanent member of the group.

From August to September 1869 Frances was engaged on a journey across Europe, to see the working of the Polish community and meet its founder. Before returning to England, Frances visited the mother house of the Servants of the Sacred Hearts of Jesus and Mary in Antwerp. Mère Jeanne Telghuis, the founder, advised her to take up laundry work. On 24 September 1869 the future founder and two of her companions were received as postulants.

On 23 January 1870 Frances Taylor took the religious name Mary Magdalen of the Sacred Heart. When the Archbishop of Posen would not allow Frances's proposed adaptations to the rule of the Polish congregation, with the advice of her supporters, she founded a separate congregation. The Congregation of the Poor Servants of the Mother of God thus came into being on 12 February 1872, when Frances made her perpetual vows.

In 1874 Frances Taylor met Augustus Dignam, who was shortly to become her spiritual director and an important adviser. In London, the sisters' principal works were the visitation and nursing of the poor in their own homes, catechising, and also the rescuing of young women from prostitution. Her friend Cardinal Manning remained a firm supporter, and the congregation's early works with the poor were focused on his Archdiocese of Westminster.

== Final years ==
The congregation grew rapidly, and by 1900, the year of Frances Taylor's death, the Poor Servants of the Mother of God administered over twenty convents and institutions, including the Providence Free Hospital, St. Helens, Merseyside. The congregation was based mainly in England and Ireland, but there were also convents in Paris and Rome. The work was focused on refuges and hostels, schools and orphanages, and health care. As a result of her traumatic experiences nursing in the Crimea, Frances Taylor suffered greatly from insomnia. She also suffered from oedema for many years, and in 1894 diabetes was diagnosed. She died in the convent, Soho Square, London, on 9 June 1900, after a long and painful illness. In the sermon preached at her funeral, Francis Scoles stated that "with pains and prayer she has left a perfect work". Frances Taylor's death was noted widely in Britain and abroad, and a large quantity of written condolences came from clergy and religious, including from as far away as Australia and the USA.

In September 1959, Frances Taylor's remains were transferred from Mortlake Cemetery, Surrey, to the chapel of the generalate and novitiate of the Poor Servants of the Mother of God at Maryfield Convent, Roehampton, London, and placed in a vault in front of the Sacred Heart altar.

In March 2023, she was one of a number of notable women with a connection to Grantham honoured by South Kesteven District Council.

== Literary works ==
Frances Taylor wrote for the service of the Catholic Church, and also for the financial support of her family and then of the religious congregation which she founded. Her book Religious Orders was printed by Emily Faithfull's Victoria Press, which had been established specifically to provide employment for women.

Some of her non-fictional works are difficult to categorise, going broadly under the headings of history, travelogue, social commentary, biography and devotional matter. In addition to these and her various fictional works, mainly collections of stories, she wrote numerous articles for Catholic magazines, and was active as a translator from the French.

In July 1864 she became founder-editor of the major Catholic literary review The Month, a position which she held for a year until it was taken over by the Jesuits. It was in this journal under her editorship that John Henry Newman's poem The Dream of Gerontius was first published.

In 1884 she helped Dignam to publish his popular Messenger of the Sacred Heart, the organ of the Apostleship of Prayer. Her works also brought her into contact with clerical literary figures, such as Henry Foley, the historian of the Society of Jesus, and Matthew Russell, the founder-editor of the Irish Monthly. Most of her published works were initially produced pseudonymously, sometimes appearing initially in journals before publication as books, and their identification and dating is often problematic. Many went through a number of editions.

== Major published works ==
- Eastern Hospitals and English Nurses (1856)
- Tyborne and who went Thither (1859)
- May Templeton, a Tale of Faith and Love [by her sister, Charlotte Sarah Dean] (editor, 1859)
- St Winefride; or Holywell and its pilgrims. A sketch (c.1860)
- Agnes, or the Fervent Novice (translated, n.d. ?1860s)
- Offerings for Orphans, a series of original pieces in Prose and Verse by Living Authors. (editor, 1861)
- Holiday Tales and Conversations (1861)
- Religious Orders
- Congregations of Women (1862)
- Irish Homes and Irish Hearts (1867)
- Practical Meditations for every day of the Year (translated and adapted, 1868)
- Holy Confidence (translation, c.1869)
- Dame Dolores and other Stories (1874)
- The Stoneleighs of Stoneleigh, and other stories (c.1879) [republished as A Pearl in Dark Waters, 1934]
- Short Meditations according to the Method of St Ignatius (edited and adapted, c.1880)
- Life of Jeanne de la Noue – A Marvellous History (c.1884)
- Lost and other Tales (c.1884)
- A Pilgrim's Guide to Rome (1887)
- Master Will and Wont and other Stories (1887)
- Life of Father John Curtis of the Society of Jesus (1889)
- A Shrine and a Story (c.1889)
- Forgotten Heroines (c.1890)
- Memoir of Father Dignam (1895)
- Retreats given by Father Augustus Dignam (c.1896-8)
- Conferences given by Father Augustus Dignam (c.1897)
- The Inner Life of Lady Georgiana Fullerton (c.1899)
- Convent Stories (1900)

== Charism and spirit ==
Mary Campion Troughton, her first biographer, has written of Taylor's impact on the community she founded. This was achieved through her determination to ensure proper training for the sisters, both spiritual and professional; her care for all of her charges, both in the community and among those whom they served; and in her concern to be a personal example of humility and labour.

She had a particular devotion to the Incarnation, to the Motherhood of the Blessed Virgin Mary, and to the Sacred Heart of Jesus. The paintings of the 'Sacred Heart Pleading' and the Annunciation which were designed (though not executed) by her are effectively visual expressions of her theological beliefs.

For Frances Taylor, the Sacred Heart was both a symbol of the Incarnation and the most perfect expression of God's love for humankind. Hence her close collaboration with Dignam in his work for the Apostleship of Prayer, which had the aim of spreading devotion to the Sacred Heart, particularly amongst the urban poor, and she also sought to encourage the work of the Apostleship in Ireland. She also had been strongly influenced by French models of the spiritual and religious life, particularly the example of Vincent de Paul, and this French influence is reflected in her attachment to the devotion to the Holy Face of Jesus, rather unusual in an English context.

== Beatification process ==
The first prayer for Mother Magdalen's beatification was published in 1935. A cause for the beatification was opened by Cardinal Basil Hume in 1982. By a decree of the Congregation for the Causes of Saints, she was declared venerable on 12 June 2014.

== Bibliography ==
- Mother Mary Magdalen of the Sacred Heart, Foundress of the Poor Servants of the Mother of God by F. C. Devas (London, 1927)
- Frances Taylor, Mother Magdalen SMG, a Portrait 1832–1900 by Sr Eithne Leonard SMG (St Paul's Publishing, London, 2015)
- Born to Love, Fanny Margaret Taylor by Mother M. Geraldine O'Sullivan SMG (London, 1970)
- A Woman of her Time and Ours – Mary Magdalen Taylor SMG by Ruth Gilpin Wells (2nd edn, Charlotte NC, USA, 1994)
