= Cecilia Caddell =

Irish writer

- Born: Cecilia Mary Caddell; 1814; Harbourstown, County Meath, Ireland
- Died: 11 September 1877 (aged 62–63); Harbourstown, County Meath, Ireland
- Writing career
- Language: English
- Genre: Historical fiction
- Subjects: Religious biographies; hymns

Cecilia Mary Caddell (1814 – 11 September 1877) was an Irish author who wrote popular Catholic inspirational literature, novels, hymns, and biographies.

== Early life ==
Caddell was born in Harbourstown, the daughter of Richard O'Ferrall Caddell and Paulina Southwell Caddell. Her mother was the daughter of Thomas Arthur, the second Viscount Southwell of Limerick. Her brother, Robert Caddell, was the High Sheriff of Meath. Her younger sister Paulina became a nun.

== Literary career ==
Caddell's works were concentrated in Catholic literature. She was a contributor to Catholic periodicals such as The Lamp and The Irish Monthly Magazine. The Catholic Union and Times wrote that her works served to "elevate the tone of the reading Catholic public". Her most popular work is Blind Agnese, or, Little spouse of the blessed sacrament (1856), which was translated into Italian, French, and republished multiple times. Caddell also wrote historical fiction, such as her three-volume novel Wild Times, a tale of the days of Queen Elizabeth (1865) and Nellie Netterville, or, One of the transplanted (1867). She also published religious biographies and religious hymns.

== Personal life ==
Caddell is commonly described as a "lifelong invalid" and suffered from a lifelong chronic illness. Despite this, Caddell likely travelled abroad, having described visits to Lourdes and Aix in her work. She died in Harbourstown, County Meath, in 1877, in her sixties, and her funeral was attended by Edward Preston, 13th Viscount Gormanston and her older sister Sophia's husband, Royal Navy Admiral Arthur Jerningham.

== Works ==
- The Miner's Daughter. London: Burns, Oates & Washbourne. n.d.
- A Pearl in Dark Waters. London: Burns, Oates & Washbourne. n.d.
- Father de Lisle, A Story of Tyborne. London: Burns, Oates & Washbourne. n.d.
- Blanche Leslie. London: Burns, Oates & Washbourne. n.d.
- Minister’s Daughter. London: Burns, Oates & Washbourne n.d..
- Little Snowdrop. London: Burns, Oates & Washbourne. n.d.
- Tales for the Young. London: Burns, Oates & Washbourne. n.d.
- Flowers and Fruit; Or the Use of Tears. Duffy and Company. 1855.
- Lost Genevieve. London: Burns, Oates & Washbourne. 1856
- Blind Agnese: or, The Little Spouse of the Blessed Sacrament. Dublin: James Duffy. 1856.
- A history of the missions in Japan and Paraguay. London: Burns and Lambert. 1856.
- "Seymour's Curse, or the Last Mass of Owlesbury" (1857, The Home and Foreign Review)
- Home and the Homeless: A Novel. London: T. C. Newby. 1858.
- Wild Times: A Tale of the Days of Queen Elizabeth. London: John Murray. 1865.
- Nellie Netterville: or, One of the Transplanted. A Tale. London: Burns and Oates. 1867.
- Hidden Saints, Life of Soeur Marie, the workwoman of Liege. London: Burns and Oates. 1869.
- Never Forgotten: or, The Home of the Lost Child. London: Burns and Oates. 1871.
- "The Festival of the Banners at Lourdes, in 1872" (1874, The Irish Monthly)
- "Madame de Saisseval" (1875, The Irish Monthly)
- "Early Days of Madame Barat" (1876, The Irish Monthly)
- "Aix and the Falls of Grezy" (1876, The Irish Monthly)
- "The Dark Pond of Châteaulandrin. A Legend of Brittany" (1876, The Irish Monthly)
