= James Moyes =

The Very Reverend James Moyes
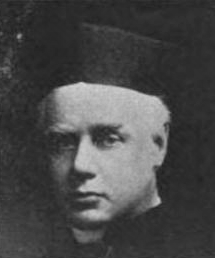
- Born: 1851; Edinburgh, Scotland
- Died: 11 March 1927 (aged 75–76); London, England
- Occupations: Writer, theologian

James Moyes (1851–1927) was a Scottish writer, theologian, and controversialist.

== Biography ==
Moyes was born in Edinburgh in 1851. He was educated in Ireland, France, and Rome at the Venerable English College, Rome. Ordained into the priesthood in 1875, he was later appointed professor at St Bede's College, Manchester, England. He was appointed canon theologian of Salford Chapter, 1891, and of the Westminster Chapter, 1895. In 1896, he served on the Papal Commission in Rome on Anglican matters on which he was an authority. In 1903 he was chosen as sub-delegate Apostolic for the Cause of English Martyrs. He edited the Dublin Review until 1903, contributed a vast amount of controversial literature on theological subjects to The Tablet, and wrote Aspects of Anglicanism, 1906.

Moyes died at the Hospital of St John and St Elizabeth in London on 11 March 1927.

== Works or publications ==
- The Existence of God, Sands & Company, (1905).
- Why do Catholics Pray to the Blessed Virgin, The Westminster Cathedral Chronicle, (1916).
- Moyes, James (September 1912). "Père Hyacinthe's Marriage". The Nineteenth Century and After. 72 (427). New York; London: Leonard Scott Publication; Spottiswoode: 581–588. LCCN sf96091374. OCLC 08456197.
