= John Brande Morris =

English priest and theologian

John Brande Morris, known to friends as Jack Morris (born at Brentford, Middlesex, 4 September 1812; died at Hammersmith, London, 9 April 1880) was an English Anglican theologian, later a Roman Catholic priest. He was a noted academic eccentric, but an important scholar of Syriac.

== Life ==
He studied at Balliol College, Oxford, graduating in 1834 (B.A. honours) and 1837 (M.A.). He was then elected Petrean Fellow of Exeter College, Oxford, lecturing on Hebrew and Syriac.

Having joined the Tractarian Movement, in 1839 Morris was briefly left to deputize for John Henry Newman at St Mary's, Oxford, the university church: he alarmed his audience with a sermon on angels and fasting, "declaring inter alia that the brute creation should be made to fast on fast days". His next sermon, which preached the doctrine of transubstantiation, and "added in energetic terms that everyone was an unbeliever, carnal, and so forth, who did not hold it", earned him an admonition from the university vice-chancellor. His views on fasting and celibacy, explained in a letter of 1840 to his close friend F. W. Faber, earned him the nickname "Simeon Stylites".

It was little surprise when Morris was received into the Catholic Church on 16 January 1846, resigning his Oxford fellowship a few days later. He was ordained at Oscott in 1851 and in the same year was appointed professor at Prior Park near Bath. He soon began parish work and for the next nineteen years ministered in Plymouth, Shortwood (Somerset) and other parts of England.

From 1855 to 1861, he served as chaplain to Sir John Acton, but offended Acton by his preaching, too explicit on the topic of the breasts of the Blessed Virgin Mary.

Though from 1868 to 1870 he managed to secure work as chaplain to Coventry Patmore, friends had to organize a fund for his relief in 1871. In 1870, he became spiritual director of a Hammersmith community of nursing nuns, the Soeurs de Miséricorde, a post he occupied until his death on 9 April 1880.

== Works ==
His favourite field of study was Eastern and patristic theology. While at Oxford he wrote an "Essay towards the Conversion of Learned and Philosophical Hindus" (1843); a poem entitled "Nature: a Parable" (1842); and translated "Select Homilies from St. Ephraem" from the Syriac (1846), likewise John Chrysostom's "Homilies on the Romans" (1841) for the Library of the Fathers.

After his conversion he contributed to the Dublin Review, The Lamp, Irish Monthly, and other Catholic periodicals, and wrote:

- An Essay Towards the Conversion of Learned and Philosophical Hindus, 1843
- Selected works of S. Ephrem the Syrian, 1847
- Jesus the Son of Mary
  - Volume I, 1851
  - Volume II, 1851
- Talectha Koomee, 1858
- "Eucharist on Calvary", an essay on the first Mass and the Passion.
