= Poor Servants of the Mother of God =

Roman Catholic religious congregation for women

The Poor Servants of the Mother of God are a Roman Catholic religious congregation founded in 1869 by Mary Magdalen of the Sacred Heart, Frances Margaret Taylor. She was closely assisted by her friend and benefactor Lady Georgiana Fullerton, and following her death, by her husband, A G Fullerton (1808-1907).

== History ==
Frances Margaret Taylor in the Crimea

Frances Taylor had served as a nurse in the Crimea, where she encountered the Sisters of Mercy. She was received into the Roman Catholic Church by Father Woollett on 14 April 1855, and later wrote a book about her wartime experiences. Upon her return to England, she consulted Henry Edward Manning, rector of St Mary of the Angels, Bayswater, who put her in touch with Catholic charitable organisations, allowing her to work with the London poor as she desired.

She first met Lady Georgiana Fullerton around 1859. Between 1859 and 1866, Frances explored a religious vocation, including time spent with the Daughters of Charity in Paris and the Filles de Marie (Daughters of the Heart of Mary) in England. Around 1865-7, with the support of Manning and James Clare, rector of the Immaculate Conception Church, Farm Street, Frances visited Ireland to study Catholic charitable institutions, partly to better assist Irish emigrants in England.

Her collaboration with Fullerton led to the foundation of a congregation for work among the poor of London. At first an affiliation with the Little Sisters of Mary (Archduchy of Posen) was considered. In 1867, Lady Georgiana translated the rule of the ‘Little Servant Sisters of the Immaculate Conception’, a rural Polish congregation. Permission was granted by the founder, Edmund Bojanowski, to establish the congregation in England. On 24 October 1868, Frances Taylor took charge of a putative English branch of this congregation, in rented rooms in Fleet Street, London. In February 1869, at the invitation of the order of priests, the Missionary Oblates of Mary Immaculate, the community moved to the Catholic mission at Tower Hill, where they worked until June 1870.

On 12 February 1872, the new congregation came formally into being when Taylor took her religious vows and the name Sister Mary Magdalen of the Sacred Heart. Affiliation with the Polish congregation was found to be impracticable, and the new order was placed under the direction of its own superior general, Mother M. Magdalen. From the first it was approved and encouraged by Cardinal Henry Edward Manning, its spiritual training being committed to the Fathers of the Society of Jesus, on Farm St., London. Originally, a black habit was worn, with a blue scapular and a black veil.

The members devoted themselves to visiting the poor, teaching in parochial schools, nursing in central London and Soho. The early foundations of the congregation included refuges, night shelters, schools, a workhouse, a home for the elderly, and the Providence Hospital in St Helens, Lancashire.

The main other foundations made during Magdalen's lifetime were: Limerick, Ireland. (1874); Margate, Kent (1874); Carrigtwohill, County Cork, Ireland (1875); Roehampton, London (1871); Brentford, Middlesex (1880); St. Helens, Lancashire (1882); Monkstown, County Cork (1881); North Hyde, Middlesex (1883); Rome (1886); Streatham, London (1888); Dublin (1888); Paris (1890); Liverpool (1891); Woodford Green, Essex (1894); Rhyl, Wales (1899); Selkirk, Scotland (1899); and her last foundation at Loughlinstown, Ireland (1899).

Its constitutions were written by Augustus Dignam, in conjunction with Magdalen. On 18 July 1879 the Brief of Praise or Decretum Laudis was granted, signed by Pope Leo XIII. On 1 May 1892 the Brief of Approbation of the Institute and Constitutions was granted. The definitive approval of the constitutions was granted by the Holy See on 19 July 1900, a month after Magdalen's death.

The Generalate is based at Maryfield Convent, Roehampton, London. The congregation was focused upon work in England and Ireland, but it has also had houses in Italy and France; as of 2017 it had extended its charitable work to the United States, Venezuela, Kenya and Tanzania. The UK social care services of the congregation are under the operating name the Frances Taylor Foundation, which runs homes for the elderly and provides services for people with learning difficulties.

== Bibliography ==
- Mother Mary Magdalen of the Sacred Heart, Foundress of the Poor Servants of the Mother of God by F. C. Devas (London, 1927)
- A Brief Life of Mother Magdalen Taylor by Sr Rose Joseph Kennedy SMG (St Mary’s Convent, Brentford, 2008)
- Born to Love – Fanny Margaret Taylor by Mother Mary Geraldine O’Sullivan SMG (London, 1970)
- Frances Taylor, Mother Magdalen SMG, a Portrait 1832–1900 by Sr Eithne Leonard SMG (St Paul's Publishing, London, 2015)

This article incorporates text from a publication now in the public domain: Herbermann, Charles, ed. (1913). Catholic Encyclopedia. Robert Appleton Company.
