= Henry James Coleridge =

Henry James Coleridge (born 20 September 1822, in Devon, England; d. Roehampton, 13 April 1893) was a writer on religious affairs and preacher. He served as editor of The Month for over fifteen years.

== Life ==
He was the son of Sir John Taylor Coleridge, a Judge of the King's Bench, and brother of John Coleridge, 1st Baron Coleridge, Chief Justice of England. His grandfather, Captain James Coleridge, was brother of Samuel Taylor Coleridge, the poet and philosopher.

He was sent to Eton at the age of thirteen and thence to Oxford, having obtained a scholarship at Trinity College. His university career was distinguished; in 1844 he took the highest honours in a fellowship at Oriel, then the blue ribbon of the university. In 1848 he received Anglican orders. The Tractarian movement being then at its height, Coleridge, with many of his tutors and friends, joined its ranks and was an ardent disciple of John Henry Newman till his conversion.

Gradually various incidents, the secession of Newman, Renn Hampden's appointment as Regius Professor of Theology, the condemnation and suspension of Edward Bouverie Pusey, the condemnation and deprivation of William George Ward, and the decision in the Gorham case, seriously shook his confidence in the Church of England. In consequence Edward Hawkins, Provost of Oriel, declined to admit him as a college tutor, and he therefore accepted a curacy at Alphington, a parish recently separated from that of Ottery St Mary, the home of his family, where his father had built for him a house and school. His doubts as to his religious position continued, however, to grow and early in 1852 he determined that he could no longer remain in the Anglican Communion.

== Conversion to Catholicism ==
On Quinquagesima Sunday (22 February) he bade farewell to Alphington, and in April, after a retreat at Clapham under the Redemptorist Fathers, he was received into the Catholic Church. Determined to be a priest he proceeded in the following September to Rome and entered the Accademia dei Nobili, where he had for companions several of his Oxford friends, and others, including the future Cardinals Manning and Vaughan. He was ordained in 1856 and six months later took the degree of S.T.D. In the summer of 1857 he returned to England, and on 7 September entered the Jesuit Novitiate, which was then at Beaumont Lodge, Old Windsor, his novice master being Thomas Tracy Clarke, for whom to the end of his life he entertained the highest admiration and esteem.

== The Month ==
In 1859 he was sent to the Theological College of St. Beuno's, North Wales, as a professor of Scripture, and remained there until, in 1865, he was called to London to become the first Jesuit editor of The Month, a magazine started under Frances Margaret Taylor in the previous year and subsequently sold to the Jesuits. He continued as editor for more than fifteen years.

After the death of William Maher, in 1877, he added the editorship of the Messenger of the Sacred Heart, for which he was one of the most prolific writers. He projected and carried on the Quarterly Series to which he himself largely contributed, both with his work The Public Life of Our Lord and others, such as The Life and Letters of St. Francis Xavier and The Life and Letters of St. Teresa. He also wrote a Harmony of the Gospels, Vita Vitae Nostrae, a favourite book for meditation, published also in an English version. And he wrote studies based on the New Testament, an interest which seems to have been partly acquired from his old Oxford tutor, Isaac Williams.

For a time he was also superior of his religious brethren in Farm Street, London. In 1881 failing health obliged him to resign The Month to another Oxonian, Richard F. Clarke, but he continued to work on The Life of Our Lord. In 1890 a paralytic seizure compelled him to withdraw to the novitiate at Roehampton, where he finished the work before dying. The chief sources for his life are articles in The Month, June, 1893, by his friend James Patterson, Bishop of Emmaus, and the Jesuit Richard F. Clarke.

== Works of Henry J. Coleridge ==
Works available at archive.org
