= Dublin Review (Catholic periodical) =

Catholic periodical founded in 1836

- Founded: 1836
- Final issue: 1969
- Country: United Kingdom
- Based in: London
- Language: English

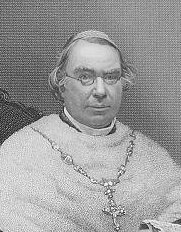
Cardinal Wiseman

The Dublin Review was a Catholic periodical founded in 1836 by Michael Joseph Quin, Cardinal Nicholas Wiseman and Daniel O'Connell. The fame of the "Edinburgh Review" suggested a territorial title, and Dublin was chosen as a great Catholic centre, though from the first it was edited and published in London.

== History ==
Quin had the original idea for the new journal, soon persuading Wiseman to lend his support, and next enlisting O'Connell whose Catholic Emancipation campaign he admired. Of its first beginnings, Cardinal Wiseman wrote: "It was in 1836 that the idea of commencing a Catholic Quarterly was first conceived by the late learned and excellent Mr. Quin, who applied to the illustrious O'Connell and myself to join in the undertaking". Quin became the editor and chief contributor, writing five articles in the first number and four in the second. But the enterprise was not remunerative. After two numbers he resigned the editorship, being unable to devote so much time and trouble without financial advantage, but continued to contribute articles to succeeding issues. During 1842 he edited "The Tablet".

The name was chosen because Dublin was a centre of Catholic culture, and it echoed the title of the flourishing Edinburgh Review, but the journal was actually published in London: quarterly at first, then monthly. Early issues had a succession of editors, irregular publication dates, and a lack of subscribers -which caused financial difficulties. With Henry Bagshawe taking over as editor in October 1837, things stabilized. From the first, Wiseman was determined that the review should avoid extreme political views. Charles William Russell was an early and frequent contributor and drafted a number of his colleagues at Maynooth to contribute articles as well.

=== The Tractarians ===
According to Andrew Hilliard Atteridge, writing in the Catholic Encyclopedia, "The review was intended to provide a record of current thought for educated Catholics and at the same time to be an exponent of Catholic views to non-Catholic inquirers." Beginning ahead of the Oxford Movement, it published articles which influenced the religious thought of the times. In August 1839 an article by Wiseman caught the attention of John Henry Newman. Gradually, Tractarian converts such as John Brande Morris and Thomas William Allies began to contribute. Wiseman had to deal with tensions between the established Catholics and new Anglo-Catholic converts, and sought to maintain a balance in the type and variety of articles printed.

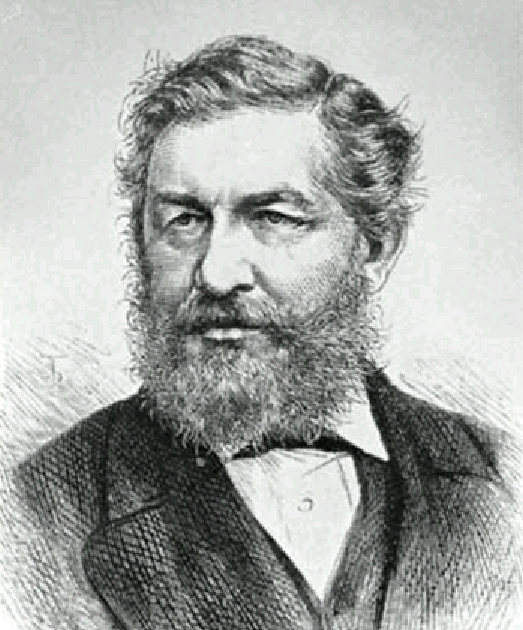
William George Ward

=== Liberalism ===
When William George Ward took over as editor in July 1863, he continued this conciliatory approach up to a point, deferring editorial decisions on politics, history, or literature to capable sub-editors; but in theological matters, he did not hesitate to attack the liberalism of Montalembert or Döllinger.

After the Vatican Council, editor J. C. Headley, a Benedictine, took a more temperate line. With the wealth of publications then coming into print, it was no longer practical to engage in debate, and Headley was comfortable tracking trends and providing a forum for leading minds to infuse the spirit of Catholicism "into literature, history, politics, and art."

Later contributors to the magazine included Don Luigi Sturzo, E. I. Watkin, and Barbara Ward. In 1961, the name was changed to the Wiseman Review to avoid the confusion that it was published in Dublin, but the publication reverted to the original name in 1965. It ceased publication in 1969, and was incorporated into The Month.

== Editors, proprietors, publishers ==
Partial list

- Mark Aloysius Tierney, editor c.1837
- Henry Bagshawe, editor 1837-
- Charles William Russell, helped edit in Wiseman's time
- Charles Dolman, publisher 1838–1844
- William George Ward, owned and edited during 1860s and part of 1870s
- Herbert Alfred Henry Joseph Thomas, owner from 1878
- John Cuthbert Hedley, editor late 1870s
- Cardinal Manning, proprietor
- James Moyes, editor until 1903
- Wilfrid Philip Ward, owner and editor
- Shane Leslie, editor 1916–1926
- Denis Rolleston Gwynn, editor 1933-1939
- Christopher Dawson, editor 1940-1956
- Michael Derrick, editor 1956–1961

== Sources ==
- Herbermann, Charles, ed. (1913). "Periodical Literature" . Catholic Encyclopedia. New York: Robert Appleton Company.
- Oxford Dictionary of National Biography
