= Walter Maxwell-Scott =

British Army general

Major-General Sir Walter Maxwell-Scott Bt CB DSO DL
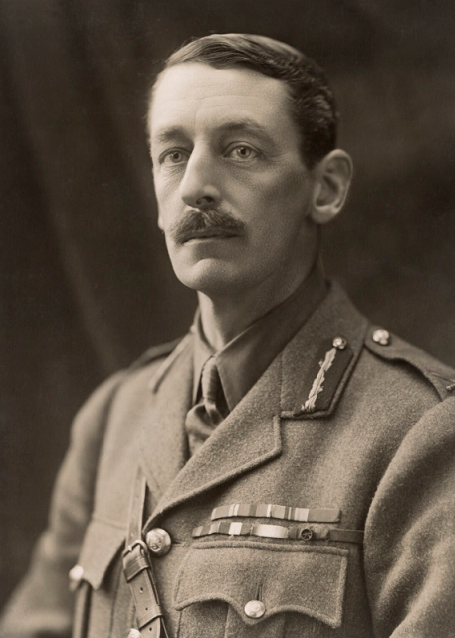
- Born: 10 April 1875
- Died: 3 April 1954 (aged 78)
- Military career
- Allegiance: United Kingdom
- Branch: British Army
- Rank: Major-General
- Commands: 132nd Infantry Brigade; 1st Rhine Brigade; 52nd (Lowland) Infantry Division
- Conflicts: Tirah campaign Second Boer War; First World War
- Awards: Companion of the Order of the Bath; Distinguished Service Order

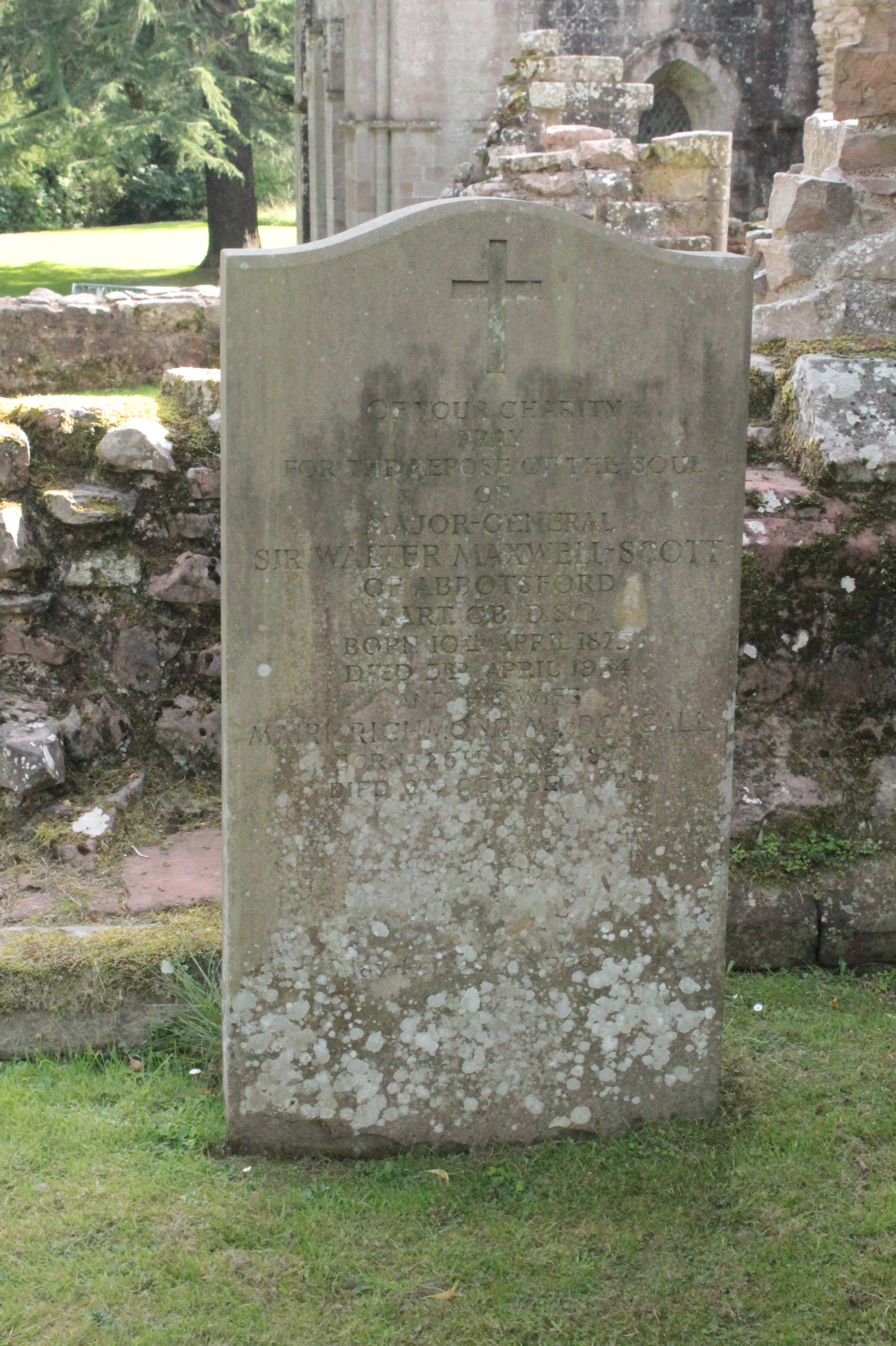
The grave of Sir Walter Maxwell-Scott, Dryburgh Abbey

Major-General Sir Walter Joseph Constable Maxwell-Scott, 1st Baronet, CB, DSO, DL (10 April 1875 – 3 April 1954) was a senior British Army officer.

== Military career ==
Educated at Stonyhurst College, Constable-Maxwell-Scott transferred from the militia into the Cameronians (Scottish Rifles) on 11 January 1899. He saw action in the Tirah campaign, the Second Boer War and the First World War for which he was appointed a Companion of the Distinguished Service Order, and promoted to temporary brigadier general in January 1918.

After the war he became commander of the 132nd Infantry Brigade in February 1923, commander of the 1st Rhine Brigade in April 1924 and General Officer Commanding 52nd (Lowland) Infantry Division in March 1930 before retiring in March 1934.

He inherited Abbotsford House on the death of his mother, Mary Monica Maxwell-Scott, in March 1920.

He is buried immediately adjacent to the side wall of Walter Scott's grave at Dryburgh Abbey.

== Family ==
In March 1918 he married Mairi Richmond Macdougall; they had two daughters (Patricia Maxwell-Scott and Dame Jean Maxwell-Scott). Following the death of his first wife, he married Countess Marie Louise de Sincay, née Logan in June 1928. Her father was Major John Alexander Logan.

Military offices
Preceded by Sir Henry Thuillier	GOC 52nd (Lowland) Infantry Division; 1930–1934	Succeeded by Andrew McCulloch
Baronetage of England
New title	Baronet (of Abbotsford ) 1932–1954	Extinct
