= Estate houses in Scotland =

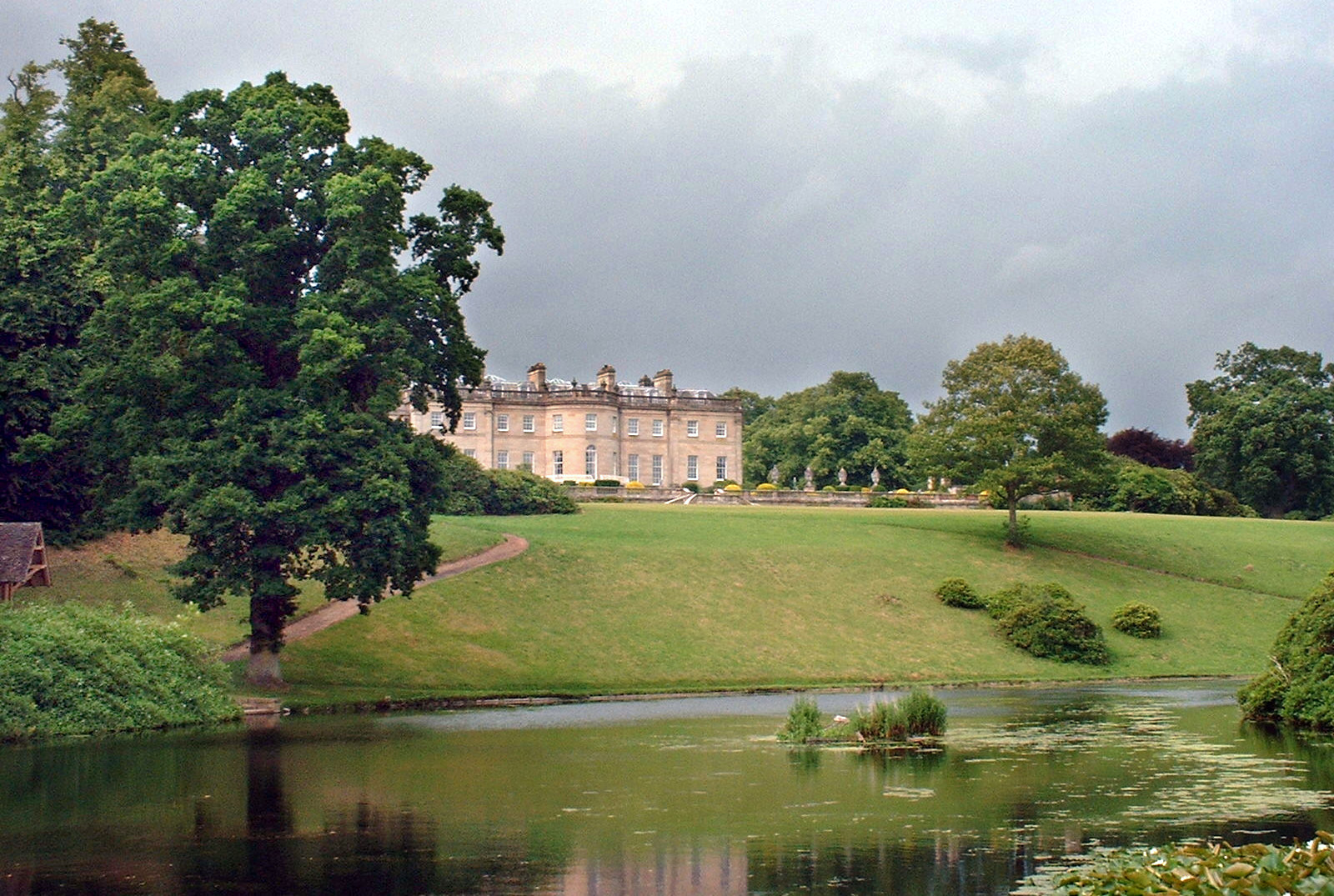
Manderston House, built in the early twentieth century and one of the last major estate houses built in Scotland

Estate houses in Scotland (or Scottish country houses) are large houses usually on landed estates in Scotland. They were built from the sixteenth century, after defensive castles began to be replaced by more comfortable residences for royalty, nobility and local lairds. The origins of Scottish estate houses are in aristocratic emulation of the extensive building and rebuilding of royal residences, beginning with Linlithgow, under the influence of Renaissance architecture. In the 1560s the unique Scottish style of the Scots baronial emerged, which combined features from medieval castles, tower houses, and peel towers with Renaissance plans, in houses designed primarily for residence rather than defence.

After the Scottish Restoration in 1660, the work of the architect Sir William Bruce introduced to Scotland a new phase of classicising architecture, in the shape of royal palaces and estate houses incorporating elements of the Palladian style. In the eighteenth century Scotland produced some of the most important British architects, including the neo-Palladian William Adam and his son Robert Adam, who rejected the Palladian style and were two of the European initiators of neoclassical architecture, embodied in a series of estate houses in Scotland and England. The incorporation of "Gothick" elements of medieval architecture by William Adam helped to launch a revival of the Scots baronial in the nineteenth century, given popularity by its use at Sir Walter Scott's Abbotsford House and Queen Victoria's retreat at Balmoral Castle. In the twentieth century the building of estate houses declined as the influence of the aristocracy waned, and many were taken over by the National Trust for Scotland and Historic Scotland.

After the Reformation, and the departure of the Scottish court in 1603, artists and artisans looked to secular patronage and estate houses became repositories of art and of elaborate furnishings. Estate houses were adorned with paintings, wood carvings and plasterwork. The Grand Tour encouraged the collection of classical art and the adoption of classical styles for new works that were incorporated into the Adam Style. The Baronial revival resulted a synthesised Victorian style that combined elements of the Renaissance, symbols of landed power and national affiliation with modern fittings. From the late sixteenth century, many estate houses were surrounded by gardens influenced by Italian Renaissance gardens. From the late seventeenth century the formal gardens at Versailles and Dutch gardens were important models. In the eighteenth century less formal and symmetrical layouts became common with the development of the English landscape garden. In the nineteenth century there was a return of the formal garden near to the house. The development of the Palladian country house in the seventeenth century separated the family of the householder from the servants. Gentry families spent much of their time visiting family, friends or neighbours, and hospitality was an important part of life. Major activities included hunting, cards, chess and music. Large and sumptuous meals were an important part of social life. In the eighteenth century, estate houses were designed as centres of public display, but in the nineteenth century they became increasingly private and developed distinct male areas.

== Architecture ==
=== Renaissance ===
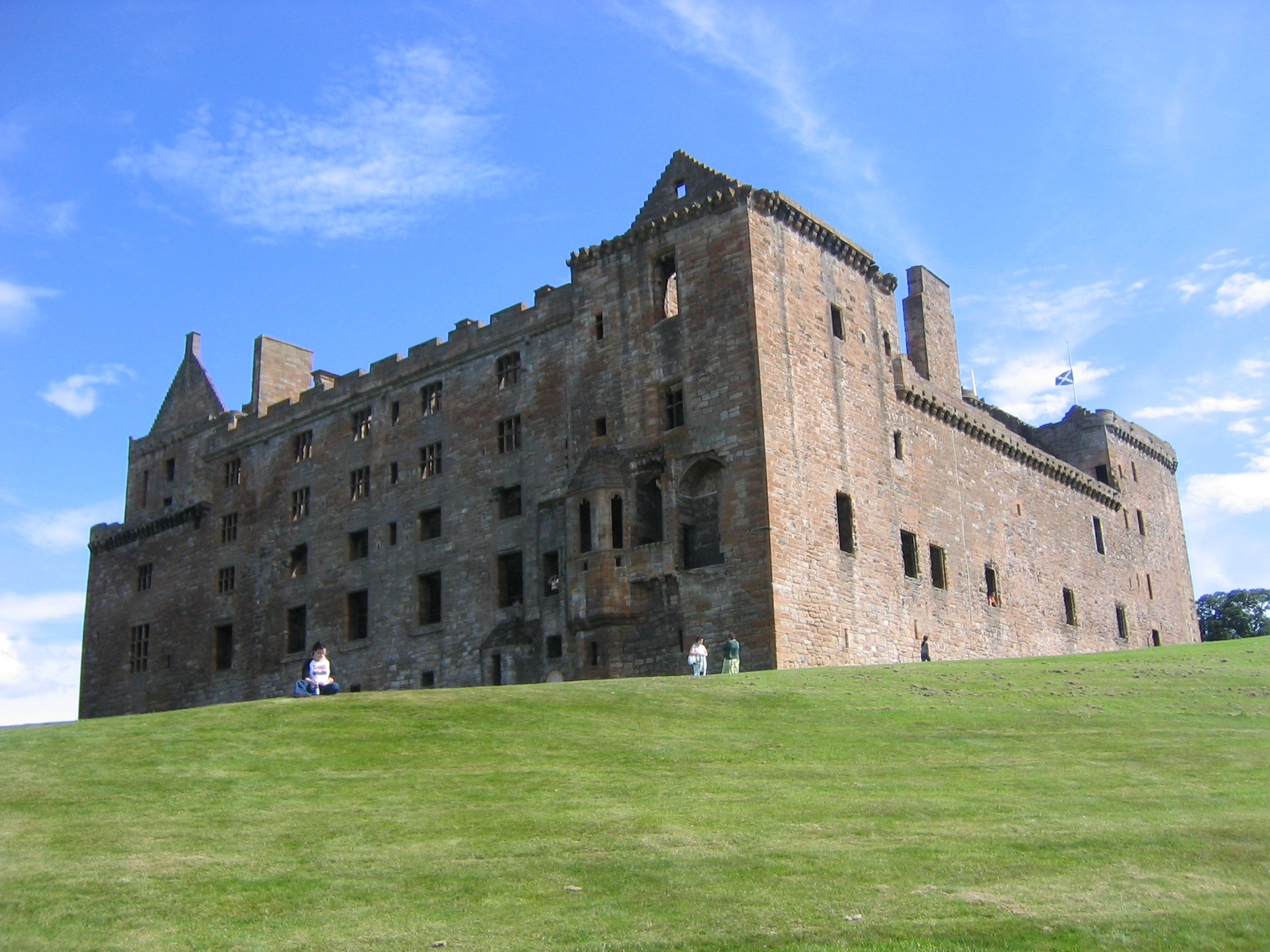
Linlithgow Palace, the first building to bear that title in Scotland, extensively rebuilt along Renaissance principles from the fifteenth century.

The origins of private estate houses in Scotland are in the extensive building and rebuilding of royal palaces that probably began under King James III (reigned 1460–88), accelerated under King James IV (r. 1488–1513), and reached its peak under King James V (r. 1512–42). These works have been seen as directly reflecting the influence of Renaissance styles. Linlithgow was first constructed under King James I, under the direction of master of work John de Waltoun and was referred to as a palace, apparently the first use of this term in the country, from 1429. This was extended under James III and began to correspond to a fashionable quadrangular, corner-towered Italian signorial palace of a palatium ad moden castri (a castle-style palace), combining classical symmetry with neo-chivalric imagery. There is evidence of Italian masons working for James IV, in whose reign Linlithgow was completed and other palaces were rebuilt with Italianate proportions. James V encountered the French version of Renaissance building while visiting for his marriage to Madeleine of Valois in 1536 and his second marriage to Mary of Guise may have resulted in longer term connections and influences. Work from his reign largely disregarded the insular style adopted in England under Henry VIII and adopted forms that were recognisably European. This was followed by re-buildings at Holyrood, Falkland, Stirling and Edinburgh, described as "some of the finest examples of Renaissance architecture in Britain".

Much of this work was planned and financed by James Hamilton of Finnart (c. 1495–1540), in addition to his work at Blackness Castle, Rothesay Castle, the house at Crawfordjohn, the "New Inn" in the St Andrews Cathedral Priory and the lodging at Balmerino Abbey for the ailing Queen Madeleine. Rather than slavishly copying continental forms, most Scottish architecture incorporated elements of these styles into traditional local patterns, adapting them to Scottish idioms and materials (particularly stone and harl). Work undertaken for King James VI (later also James I of England) demonstrated continued Renaissance influences, with the Chapel Royal at Stirling having a classical entrance built in 1594 under the direction of William Schaw and the North Wing of Linlithgow, built in 1618, using classical pediments, designed by James Murray. Similar themes can be seen in the private houses of aristocrats, as in Mar's Wark, Stirling (c. 1570) and Crichton Castle, built for the Earl of Bothwell in the 1580s.

=== Scots Baronial ===
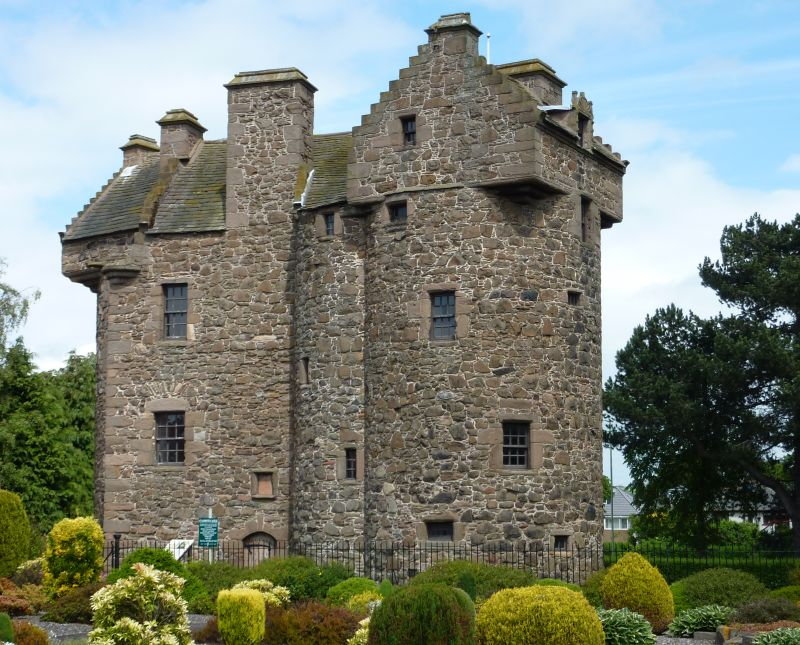
The sixteenth-century Claypotts Castle, showing features of the Baronial style

The unique style of great private houses in Scotland, later known as Scots baronial, originated in the 1560s. It kept features of the high walled Medieval castles that had been made largely obsolete by gunpowder weapons and may have been influenced by the French masons brought to Scotland to work on royal palaces. It drew on the tower houses and peel towers, hundreds of which had been built by local lords since the fourteenth century, particularly in the borders. These abandoned defensible curtain walls in favour of a fortified refuge, designed to outlast a raid, rather than a sustained siege. They were usually of three stories, typically crowned with a parapet, projecting on corbels, continuing into circular bartizans at each corner. The new houses built from the late sixteenth century by nobles and lairds were primarily built for comfort, not for defence. They retained many of these external features, which had become associated with nobility, but with a larger ground plan. This was classically a "Z-plan" of a rectangular block with towers, as at Colliston Castle (1583) and Claypotts Castle (1569–88).

Particularly influential was the work of William Wallace, the king's master mason from 1617 until his death in 1631. He worked on the rebuilding of the collapsed North Range of Linlithgow from 1618, Winton House for George Seton, 3rd Earl of Winton and began work on Heriot's Hospital, Edinburgh. He adopted a distinctive style that applied elements of Scottish fortification and Flemish influences to a Renaissance plan like that used at Château d'Ancy-le-Franc. This style can be seen in lords houses built at Caerlaverlock (1620), Moray House, Edinburgh (1628) and Drumlanrig Castle (1675–89), and was highly influential until the baronial style gave way to the grander English forms associated with Inigo Jones in the later seventeenth century.

=== Restoration ===
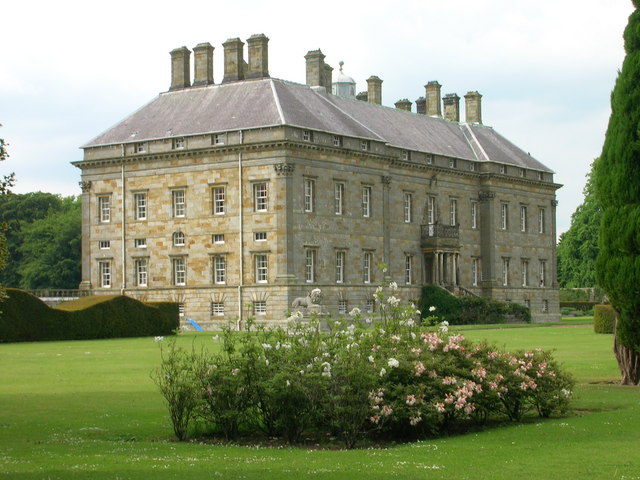
Kinross House, one of the first Palladian houses in Britain

During the turbulent era of Civil Wars (1639–51) and the English occupation of Scotland (1651–60), significant building in Scotland was largely confined to military architecture. After the Restoration in 1660, large scale building began again, often incorporating more comprehensive ideas of reviving classicism. Sir William Bruce (1630–1710), considered "the effective founder of classical architecture in Scotland", was the key figure in introducing the Palladian style into Scotland, following the principles of the Italian Renaissance architect Andrea Palladio (1508–1580). Palladio's ideas were strongly based on the symmetry, perspective and values of the formal classical temple architecture of the Ancient Greeks and Romans, and associated in England with the designs of Inigo Jones. Bruce popularised a style of country house amongst the nobility that encouraging the move towards a more continental, leisure-oriented architecture. He built and remodelled country houses, including Thirlestane Castle and Prestonfield House. Among his most significant work was his own Palladian mansion, Kinross House, built on the Loch Leven estate which he had purchased in 1675. As the Surveyor and Overseer of the Royal Works he undertook the rebuilding of the Royal Palace of Holyroodhouse in the 1670s, which gave the palace its present appearance. After the death of Charles II, Bruce lost political favour, and later, following the Glorious Revolution, he was imprisoned more than once as a suspected Jacobite. These houses were predominantly built using well-cut ashlar masonry on the façades, while rubble stonework was used only for internal walls.

James Smith worked as a mason on Bruce's rebuilding of Holyrood Palace. In 1683 he was appointed to be Surveyor and Overseer of the Royal Works, and was responsible for maintenance of Holyrood Palace. With his father-in-law, the master mason Robert Mylne, Smith worked on Caroline Park in Edinburgh (1685), and Drumlanrig Castle (1680s). Smith's country houses followed the pattern established by William Bruce, with hipped roofs and pedimented fronts, in a plain but handsome Palladian style. Hamilton Palace (1695) was fronted by giant Corinthian columns, and a pedimented entrance, although was otherwise restrained. Dalkeith Palace (1702–10) was modelled after William of Orange's palace at Het Loo in the Netherlands.

=== Eighteenth century ===
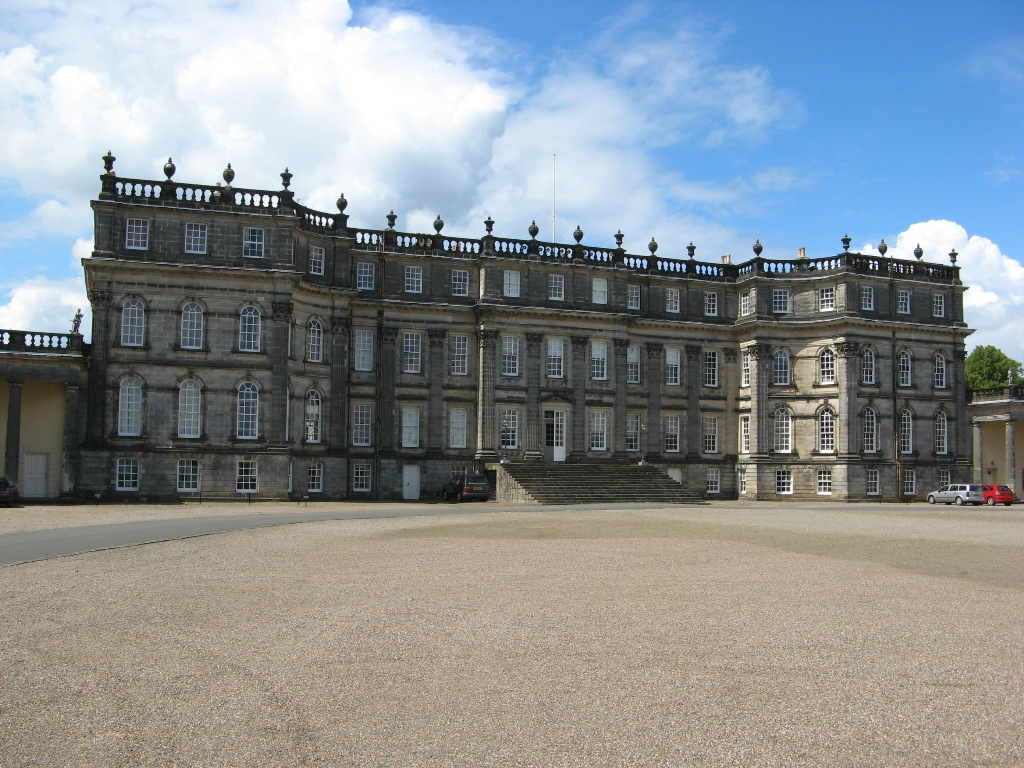
East front of Hopetoun House, designed and built by William Adam

After the Acts of Union 1707, growing prosperity in Scotland led to a spate of new building. Scotland produced some of the most significant architects of this era, including Colen Campbell (1676–1729), James Gibbs (1682–1754) and William Adam (1689–1748), who created work that to some degree looked to classical models. Campbell was influenced by the Palladian style and has been credited with founding Georgian architecture. Architectural historian Howard Colvin has speculated that he was associated with James Smith and that Campbell may even have been his pupil. He spent most of his career in Italy and England and developed a rivalry with fellow Scot James Gibbs. Gibbs trained in Rome and also practiced mainly in England. His architectural style did incorporate Palladian elements, as well as forms from Italian Baroque and Inigo Jones, but was most strongly influenced by the interpretation of the Baroque by Sir Christopher Wren.

William Adam was the foremost architect of his time in Scotland, designing and building numerous country houses and public buildings. Among his best-known works are Hopetoun House near Edinburgh, and Duff House in Banff. His individual, exuberant style was built on the Palladian, but with Baroque details inspired by Vanbrugh and Continental architecture. After his death, his sons Robert and John took on the family business, which included lucrative work for the Board of Ordnance. Robert emerged as leader of the first phase of the neo-classical revival in England and Scotland from around 1760 until his death. He rejected the Palladian style as "ponderous" and "disgustful". However, he continued its tradition of drawing inspiration directly from classical antiquity, influenced by his four-year stay in Europe. He influenced the development of architecture, not just in Britain, but in Western Europe, North America and in Russia, where his patterns were taken by Scottish architect Charles Cameron. Adam's main rival was William Chambers, another Scot, but born in Sweden. He did most of his work in London, with a small number of houses in Scotland. He was appointed architectural tutor to the Prince of Wales, later George III, and in 1766, with Robert Adam, as Architect to the King. More international in outlook than Adam, he combined Neoclassicism and Palladian conventions and his influence was mediated through his large number of pupils.

=== Baronial revival ===
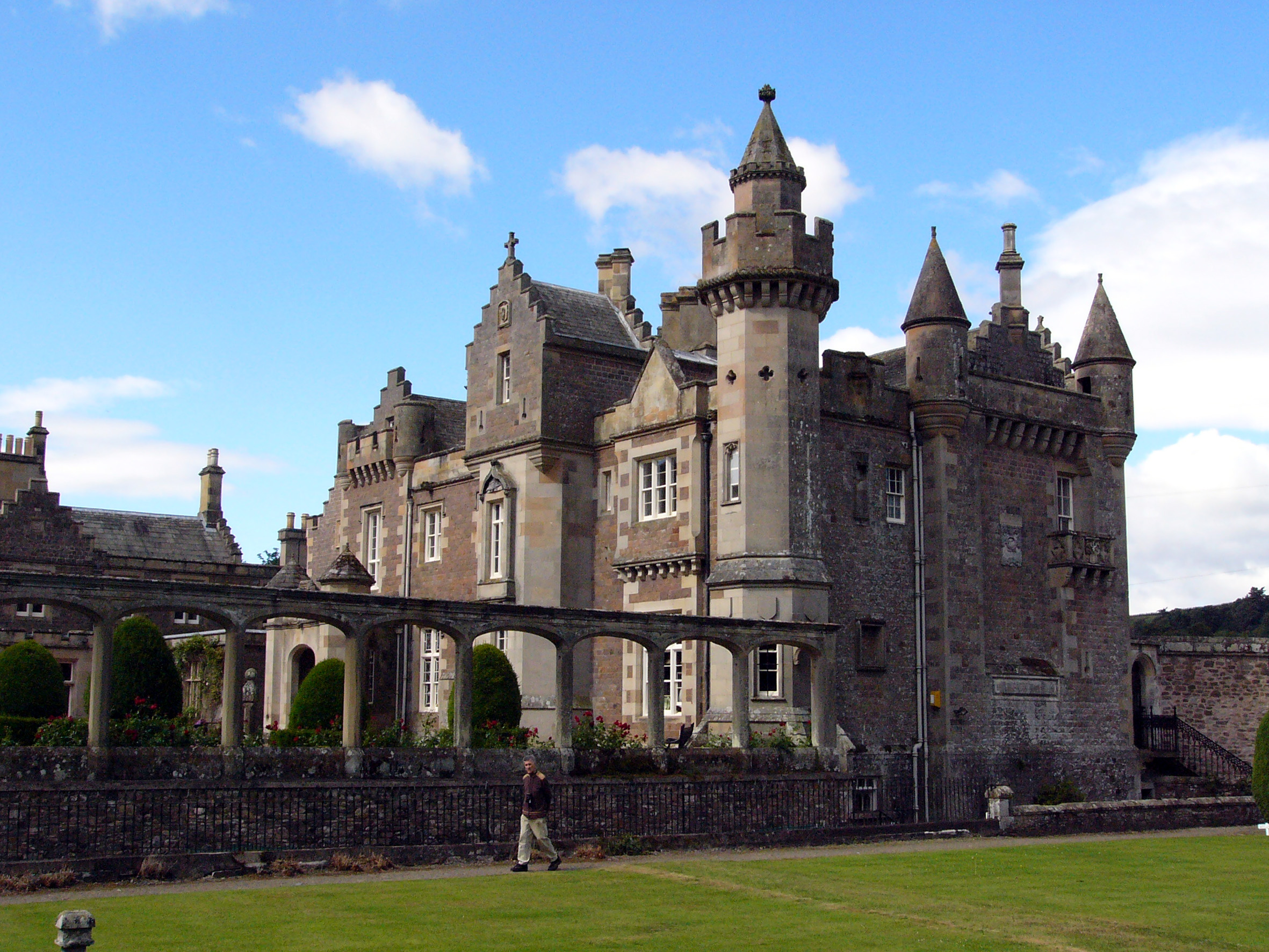
Abbotsford House, re-built for Walter Scott, helping to launch the Scots Baronial revival.

Some of the earliest evidence of a revival in Gothic architecture is from Scotland. Inveraray Castle, constructed from 1746 with design input from William Adam, displays the incorporation of turrets. These early Gothic homes were largely conventional Palladian style houses that incorporated some external features of the Scottish baronial style. Robert Adam's houses in this style include Mellerstain and Wedderburn in Berwickshire and Seton House in East Lothian, but it is most clearly seen at Culzean Castle, Ayrshire, remodelled by Adam from 1777.

Important for the adoption of the style in the early nineteenth century was Abbotsford House, the residence of the novelist and poet Sir Walter Scott. Re-built for him from 1816, it became a model for the modern revival of the baronial style. Common features borrowed from sixteenth- and seventeenth-century houses included battlemented gateways, crow-stepped gables, pointed turrets and machicolations. The style was popular across Scotland and was applied to relatively modest dwellings by architects such as William Burn (1789–1870), David Bryce (1803–76), Edward Blore (1787–1879), Edward Calvert (c. 1847–1914) and Robert Stodart Lorimer (1864–1929). The publication of Robert Billings' Baronial and Ecclesiastical Architecture of Scotland (1848–52) provided a handbook for the style and the rebuilding of Balmoral Castle as a baronial palace (and subsequent adoption as a royal retreat from 1855 to 1858) confirmed its popularity. Estate house building boomed between about 1855 and the agricultural depression and Glasgow Bank crash of 1878. Construction was now dominated by patronage from nouveau riche industrialists. The decline in numbers of servants, linked to the introduction of electricity, central heating and labour-saving devices such as the vacuum cleaner, also led to changes in the scale of building. Arts and Crafts designs first featured in Philip Webb's (1831–1915) Gothic design at Arisaig (1863–64). It was pursued by William Lethaby at Melsetter House, Hoy (1898) for a Birmingham industrialist.

=== Twentieth century to the present ===
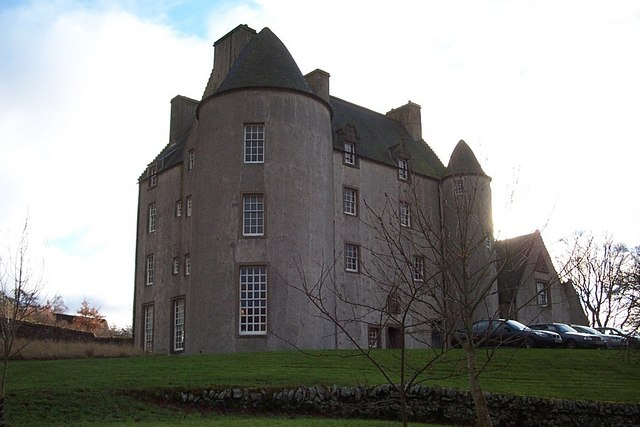
Broughton Place, a twentieth-century modern building in the seventeenth-century Scots Baronial style

The Baronial style peaked towards the end of the nineteenth century, and the building of large houses declined in importance in the twentieth century. An exception was the work undertaken by John Kinross (1855–1955). Beginning with the reconstruction of Thurston House, Dunbar, from 1890 he produced a series of major country house designs. The most important was Manderston House (1901–03), built for James Miller (1864–1906) in the Adam style. The baronial style continued to influence the construction of some estate houses, including Skibo Castle, which was rebuilt for the industrialist Andrew Carnegie (1899–1903) by Ross and Macbeth. The English architect C. H. B. Quennell (1872–1935) designed a neo-Georgian mansion at Altmore (1912–14) for the owner of a Moscow department store.

There was a lull in building after the First World War and social change undermined the construction of rural estate houses. Isolated examples included the houses designed by Basil Spence and built at Broughton Place (1936) and Gribloch (1937–39), which combined modern and traditional elements. The Second World War disrupted the occupation of estate houses, as they were used as wartime schools, barracks, evacuee housing and hospitals. After the war many were outdated, with a lack of electricity and modern plumbing. There was a shortage of live-in servants and the heavily taxed aristocracy were also unable to find the money to modernise and maintain large houses. The shortage of building materials in the post-war period also made estate houses valuable resources of stone. As a result, 200 of the 378 architecturally important estate houses have been demolished in the period after 1945, a higher proportion of the total than in England. Included in the destruction were works by Robert Adam, including Balbardie House and Hamilton Palace. One firm, Charles Brand of Dundee, demolished at least 56 country houses in Scotland in the 20 years between 1945 and 1965. The shortage of building materials further reduced the number of new large luxury houses. Isolated examples included Logan House, designed by David Style in the 1950s. In the 1960s there was Basil Hughes's design at Snaigow for the earl of Cadogan and the remodelling of Gask House by Claude Phillimore. This period also saw considerable restoration of existing houses.

== Interiors ==
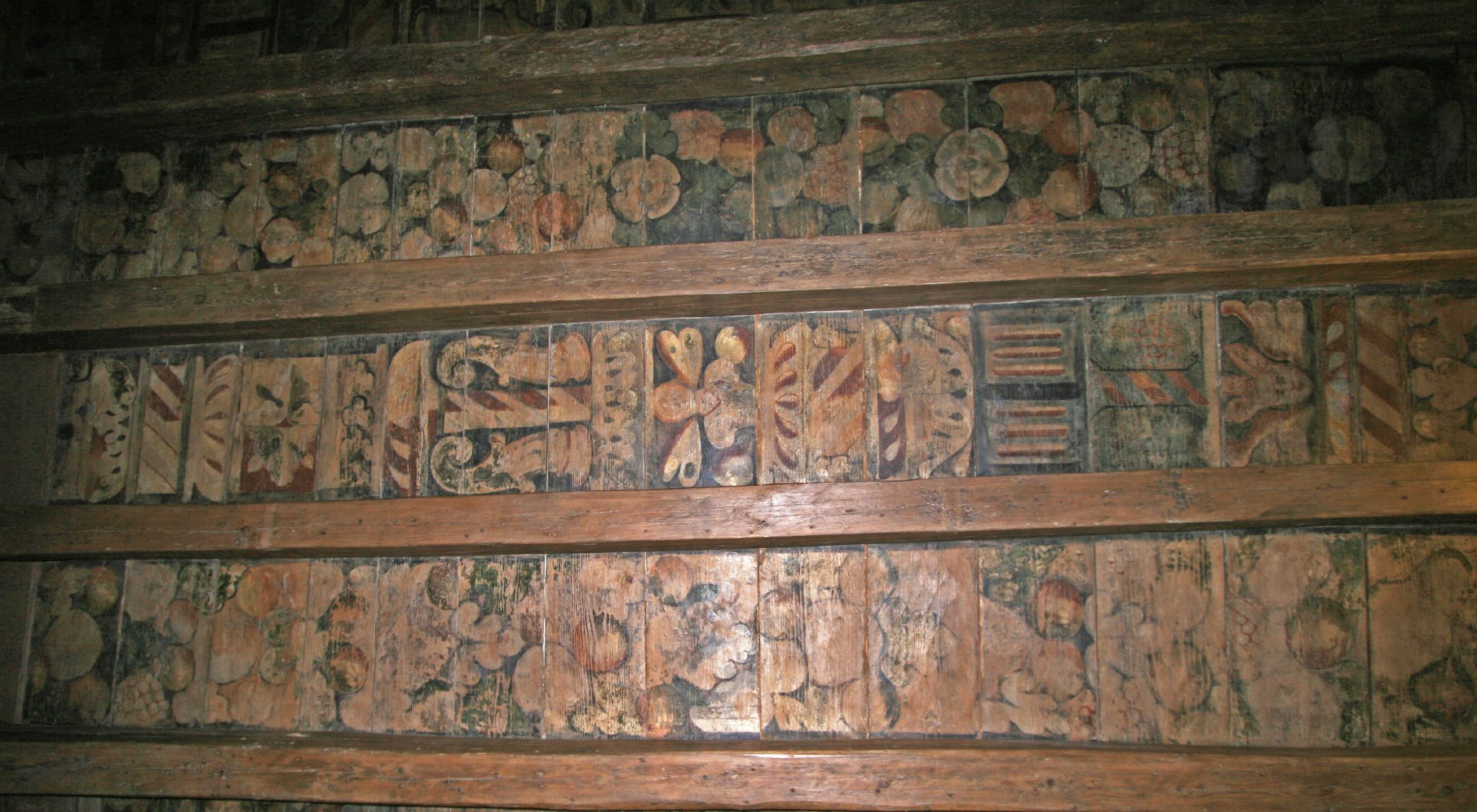
The seventeenth-century painted ceiling at Aberdour Castle, Fife

The creation of estate houses led to greater privacy, comfort and luxury for the families who lived in them. Interiors were remodelled, with broader staircases, family rooms were added and heating was improved. Oriel windows gave better views, more light and could be opened for fresh air. After the Reformation, which virtually ended religious patronage of art in Scotland, craftsmen and artists turned to secular patrons. With the departure of the Scottish court for England in 1603, Jenny Wormald argues that there was a shift "from court to castle" in patronage and creativity; estate houses became repositories of art and elaborate furnishings that illustrated the wealth and taste of their occupants.

One result was a flourishing of Scottish Renaissance painted ceilings and walls in estate houses. These included detailed coloured patterns and scenes, of which over a hundred examples survive. The designs relied upon continental pattern books that often led to the incorporation of humanist moral and philosophical symbolism, as well as elements that called on heraldry, piety, classical myths and allegory. The earliest example still extant is at the Hamilton palace of Kinneil, West Lothian, decorated in the 1550s for the then-regent James Hamilton, Earl of Arran. Other examples include the ceiling at Prestongrange House, undertaken in 1581 for Mark Kerr, Commendator of Newbattle, and the long gallery at Pinkie House, painted for Alexander Seaton, Earl of Dunfermline in 1621.

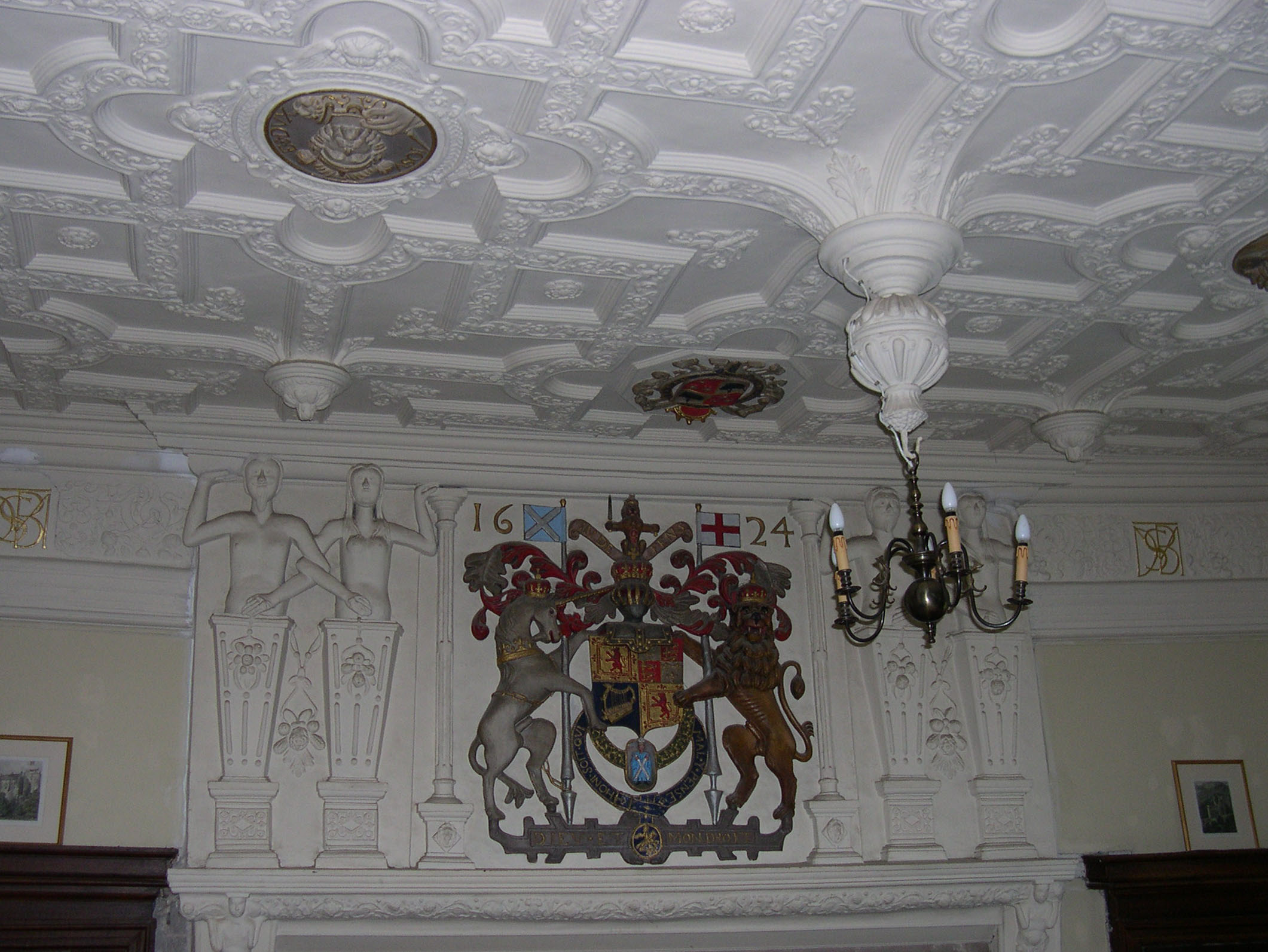
King James VI's arms and plasterwork in the great hall at Muchalls Castle

Scottish estate houses were increasingly adorned with paintings, including portraits, landscapes and later classical, genre and historical paintings. Thomas Warrender (fl. 1673–1713) made his living as a house decorator, working closely with architects, including William Adam. He may have trained James Norie (1684–1757), who with his sons James (1711–36) and Robert (d. 1766) also worked with the Adams, painting the houses of the peerage with Scottish landscapes that were pastiches of Italian and Dutch scenes. They tutored many artists and have been credited with the inception of the tradition of Scottish landscape painting that would come to fruition from the late eighteenth century. The painters Allan Ramsay (1713–84), Gavin Hamilton (1723–98), the brothers John (1744–68/9) and Alexander Runciman (1736–85), Jacob More (1740–93) and David Allan (1744–96), mostly began in the tradition of the Nories, but were artists of European significance, spending considerable portions of their careers outside Scotland. Henry Raeburn (1756–1823) was the most significant artist of the eighteenth century to pursue his entire career in Scotland, and from this point Scottish painters would be able to be professionals in their homeland, often supplying the nobility and lairds with works to fill the walls of their houses.

Carving and plasterwork also became a feature of estate houses. Some of the finest domestic wood carving is in the Beaton panels made for Arbroath Abbey, which were eventually moved to the dining room of Balfour House in Fife. Carvings at Huntly Castle, rebuilt for George Gordon, 1st Marquess of Huntly in the early seventeenth century, focused on heraldic images. Their "popish" overtones led to them being damaged by an occupying Covenanter army in 1640. From the seventeenth century there was elaborate use of carving in pediments and fireplaces, with heraldic arms and classical motifs. Plasterwork also began to be used, often depicting flowers and cherubs. William Bruce favoured Dutch carvers for his realisation of Kinross House, where there are festoons, trophies and cornucopia around the doorways and gates. This may have included the work of Jan van Sant Voort, a Dutch carver known to have been living in Leith, who supplied Bruce with a carved heraldic overdoor in 1679 and who worked on Bruce's rebuilding of Holyrood Palace. From 1674 the London plasterers George Dunsterfield (fl. 1660–76) and John Houlbert (fl. 1674–79) worked for Bruce at Thirlestane, Berwickshire and at Holyroodhouse. Dunsterfield was also active at Balcaskie, Fife and probably at Kellie Castle.

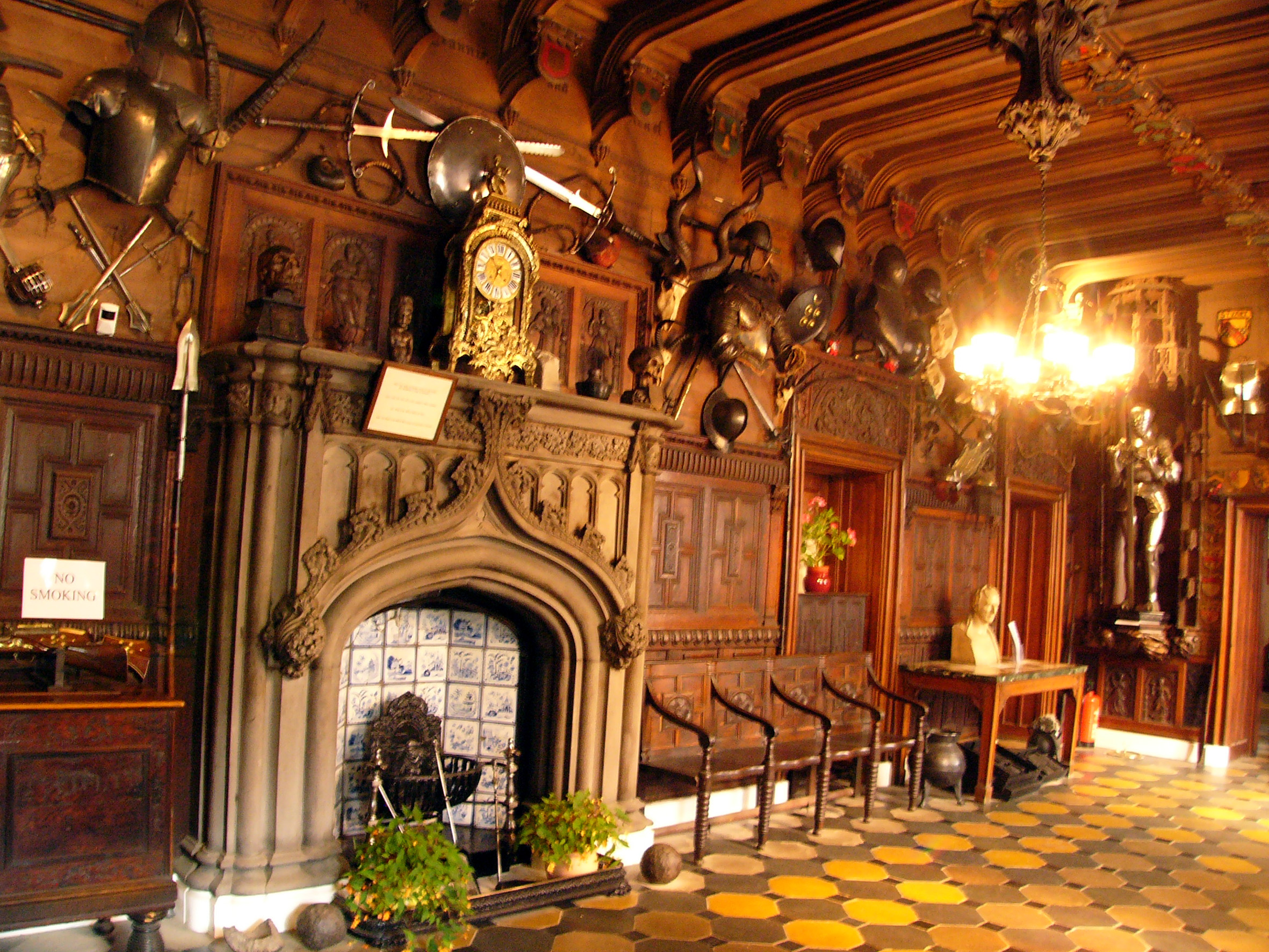
The entrance hall of Abbotsford House, which helped define the synthesised Victorian Renaissance style of the Scots Baronial interior

In the eighteenth century the development of the Grand Tour took young Scottish aristocrats to the continent, particularly Rome, which was home to the exiled Jacobite Stuarts. This in turn fuelled interest in classical and Renaissance styles, and the buying of artistic works, particularly sculptures. However, the only major Scottish collection of marble before the nineteenth century was that of James Johnstone, 2nd Marquess of Annandale. As in England, commissions of new statuary tended to be crafted in relatively cheap lead and even more economical painted or gilded plaster. The plasterwork of John Cheere's yard in London was particularly in demand. Also important was the work from the yard of John Bacon (1740–99). Bacon was also a partner in Mrs Eleanor Coade's Artificial Stone Manufactory at Lambeth in London. This produced a buff coloured ceramic that could be moulded to provide fine detail, and be fired in sections, but was impervious to frost and fire. Much cheaper than carved stone, Coadstone was used for sphinxes, balustrading, capitals, coats of arms, tablets and ornamental vases. It was used extensively by the Adam brothers, particularly in the houses they built in Scotland, such as Cullen, Banff, Culzean Castle, Ayrshire, Dunbar Castle, East Lothian, Gosford House, East Lothian and Wedderburn, Berwickshire. They also supplied sculpture, candelabra and cippi that made up the neo-classical Adam Style.

Nineteenth-century interiors could often be lavish and eclectic. The origins of this style were in Scott's Abbotsford, where the author began the incorporation of actual old architectural fragments and pieces of furniture on a lavish scale (the effective beginning of 'antique' collecting in Scotland). He also initiated the treatment of new surfaces so as to resemble old ones, with new wood darkened to resemble old oak. The Adam solution of a castellated exterior with a neo-classical interior was abandoned and in Baronial Revival houses this change was extended to create a synthesised Victorian style that combined elements of the Renaissance, such as plastered or rubble walls, unpainted stone fireplaces and pitch pine timberwork, with seventeenth-century style plaster ceilings. To this were added symbols of landed power and national affiliation, including displays of tartan, weaponry and stuffed animals' heads. Integrated into these traditional materials and styles were modern fittings such as sprung upholstery, gas lighting and water-closets.

== Gardens ==
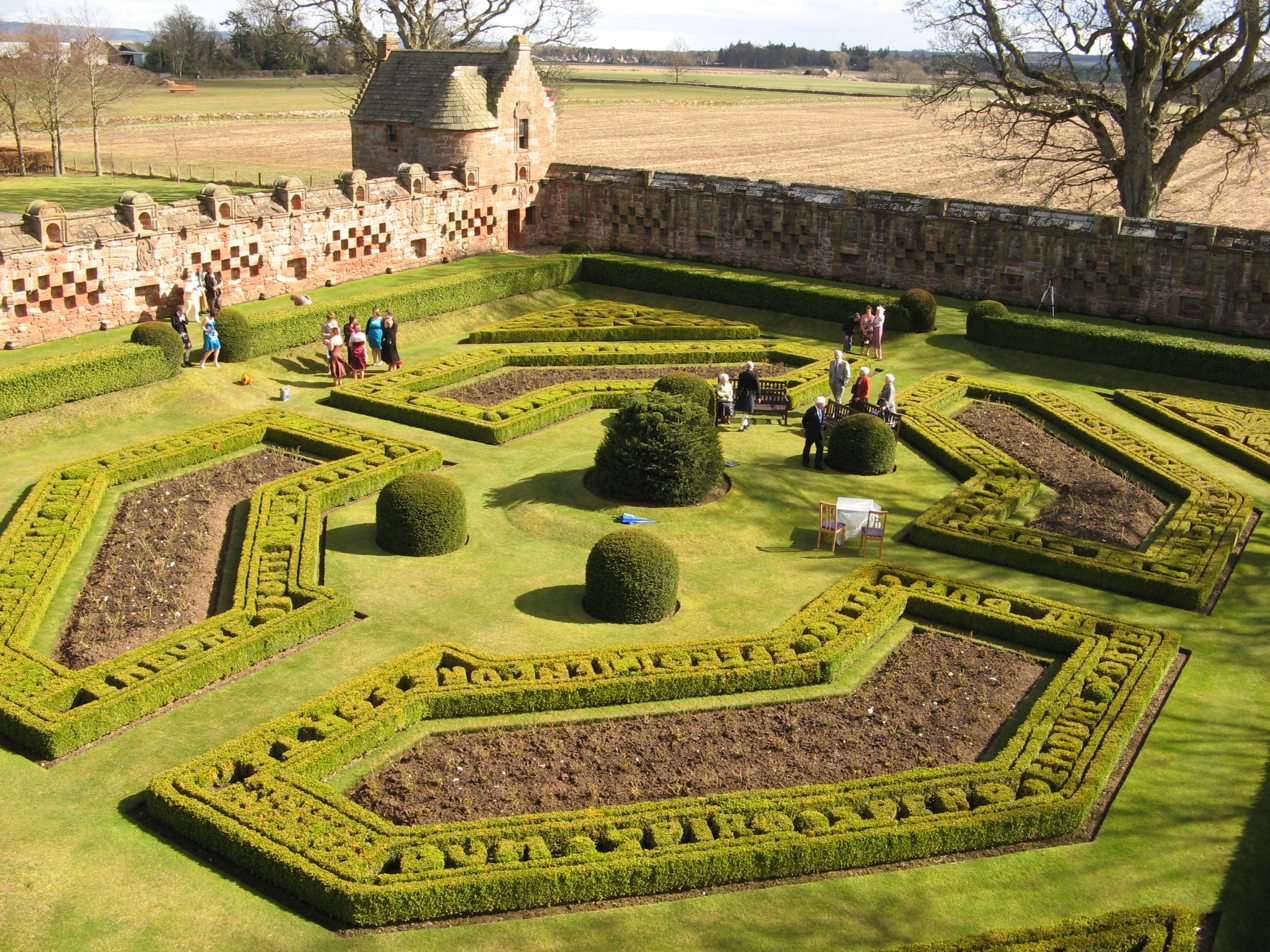
The restored formal walled garden at Edzell Castle

Gardens, or yards, around medieval castles, abbeys and houses were formal and in the European tradition of the herb garden, kitchen garden, and orchard. They were often surrounded by defensive walls and they sometimes adjoined a hunting park. The first Renaissance style gardens in Scotland were built for the Stewart dynasty at their royal palaces. French gardeners were hired by James IV at Stirling in 1501 and James V at Holyrood in 1536, where archaeological remains indicate there were sophisticated formal gardens. Similar landscaping is also found at Falkland and Linlithgow, including the king's knot garden at Stirling. From the late sixteenth century, the landscaping of many estate houses was influenced by Italian Renaissance gardens. These were seen as retreats from the troubles of the world and were eulogised in country house poetry like that of William Drummond of Hawthornden (1585–1649). Extensive gardens were developed at Pinkie House by Alexander Seton, 1st Earl of Dunfermline (1555–1622), with lawns, fountains, ponds and aviaries for the entertainment of guests. Dunfermline's nephew, George Seton, 3rd Earl of Winton (1584–1650), planted a herb garden at Seaton House in 1620. The Earl of Sutherland's castle at Dunrobin was surrounded by orchards, herbs and flowers. The best surviving garden from the early seventeenth century is that at Edzell Castle, where, between 1604 and 1610, David Lindsay (1551?–1610) created an enclosure adorned with sculptures of the seven Cardinal Virtues, the seven Liberal Arts and the seven Planetary Deities, the expense of which eventually bankrupted him.

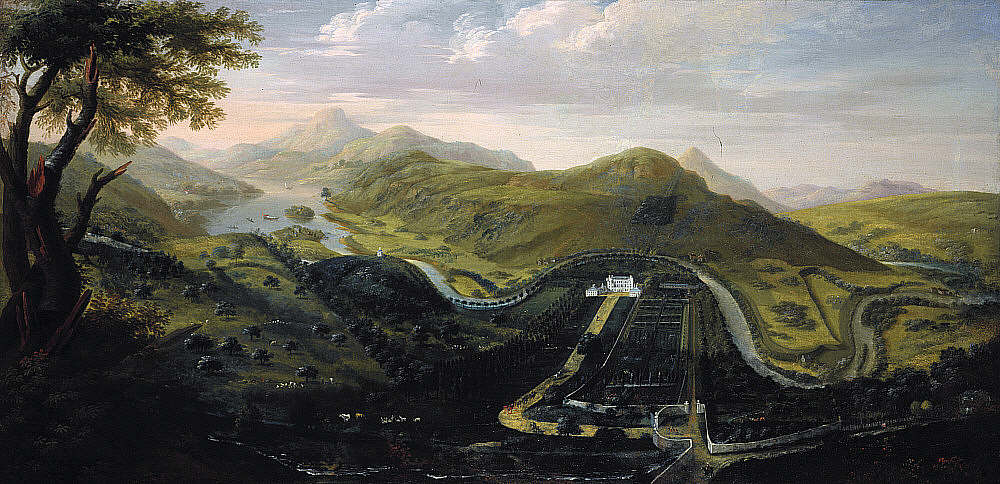
Taymouth Castle painted in 1733 by James Norie, showing William Adam's alterations to the house and gardens

The legacy of the Auld Alliance, and the beginnings of the grand tour, meant that French styles were particularly important in Scotland, although adapted for the Scottish climate. From the late seventeenth century the gardens at Versailles, with their formal avenues, parterres and fountains that stressed symmetry and order, were a model. After the Glorious Revolution Dutch influences were also significant, with uniform planting and topiary. Gardening books from the continent and England became widely available in this period and the first gardening book published in Scotland, John Reid's, Scots Gard'ner (1683), borrowed from John Evelyn's (1658) translation of Nicholas de Bonnefon's Le Jardinair françois (1651), adapting its ideas for Scottish conditions. In the late seventeenth century William Bruce put Scotland at the forefront of European garden design, lowering garden walls to incorporate the surrounding countryside into the vista. This allowed a focus on significant landscape features such as Bass rock at Balcaskie and Loch Leven Castle at Kinross. Alexander Edward (1651–1708) continued in the tradition established by Bruce, adding landscapes at houses including Hamilton Palace and Kinnaird castle, Angus. Grand schemes in the French tradition included James Douglas, 2nd Duke of Queensberry (1662–1711) reworking of the terraces at Drumlanrig Castle, which incorporated the Douglas family crest into the parterres design, and the militaristic earthworks undertaken for Field Marshal John Dalrymple, 2nd Earl of Stair (1679–1747) at Castle Kennedy, Wigtownshire. The Earl of Mar's palace at Alloa was the grandest realisation of the Versailles style gardens in Scotland: it included canals, parterres, statues and ornamental trees.

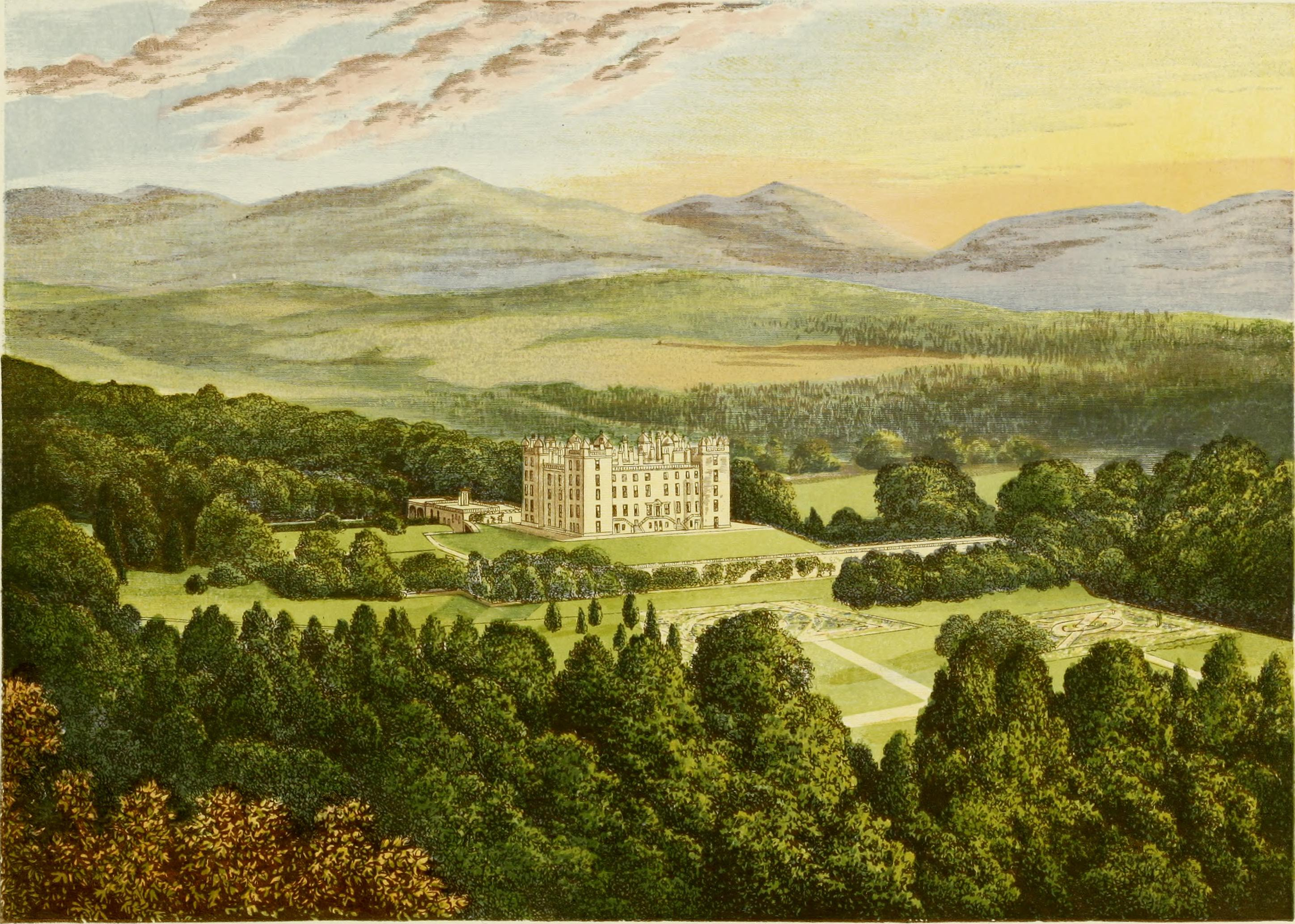
Drumlanrig Castle, Dumfries and Galloway in 1880, showing the mixture of "natural" and formal landscapes that dominated estate houses in the nineteenth century

In the eighteenth century there was a reaction against the "absolutism" and "popery" of the French court and a retreat from the expense of maintaining large formal gardens. Less symmetrical layouts became common with the development of the "natural" style of the jardin à l'anglaise, which attempted to create vistas of a rural idyll. The antiquarian John Clerk of Pennycuik (1676–1755), one of the key figures in defining elite taste in Scotland, eulogising the estate garden in his poem "The Country Seat" (1727), which built on the ideas of Alexander Pope. He created gardens at Mavisbank and Penicuik, Midlothian, with the help of William Adam, which combined formality with undulating ground. The move to a less formal landscape of parklands and irregular clumps of planting, associated in England with Capability Brown (1716–83), was dominated in Scotland by his followers, Robert Robinson and Thomas White senior and junior. From 1770 and 1809 the Whites were involved in the planning of over 70 estate gardens in Scotland, including those at Glamis Castle and Scone Palace. Important publications included James Justice's The Scottish Gardiner's Director (1754) and the reputation of Scottish gardeners in managing greenhouses, hot walls and the cultivation of fruit trees meant that they began to be in demand in England. At the end of eighteenth century there began to be a reaction to the English style of garden, influenced by Picturesque taste and the spread of Ossianic Romanticism, which encouraged gardens in the wild. This resulted in creation of features like Ossian's Hall of Mirrors at the Hermitage Dunkeld and the Hermit's Cave at the Falls of Acharn, which put an emphasis on concealment and the surprise revelation of the natural.

In the nineteenth century the writings of Humphrey Repton (1752–1818) were highly influential in the return of the formal garden near to the house. His sons were directly involved in the restructuring of the landscape at Valleyfield, Fife. Walter Scott's dislike of the sweeping away of the old formal gardens was also influential in creating an emphasis on preservation and restoration. His ideas were taken up by John Claudius Loudon (1783–1843), the most prolific gardening author of the century in Britain, and were highly influential throughout the world. By 1850 ambitious formal gardens had been recreated at Drummond Castle, Dunrobin and Drumlandrig. New plants from around the world, often discovered and sampled by Scots, such as the Rhododendron and monkey puzzle tree, meant that Victorian and Edwardian gardens were characterised by an eclectic mix of the formal, picturesque and gardenesque. By the end of the century the ideas of William Robinson (1838–1935), Gertrude Jekyll (1843–1932) and the Edinburgh-based Frances Hope (d. 1880), arguing for informal flower-based gardens, had begun to dominate. They resulted in a revival of the seventeenth-century mixed flower and kitchen garden, as carried out at Kellie Castle, and Earlshall, Fife by Robert Lorimer.

== Social life ==
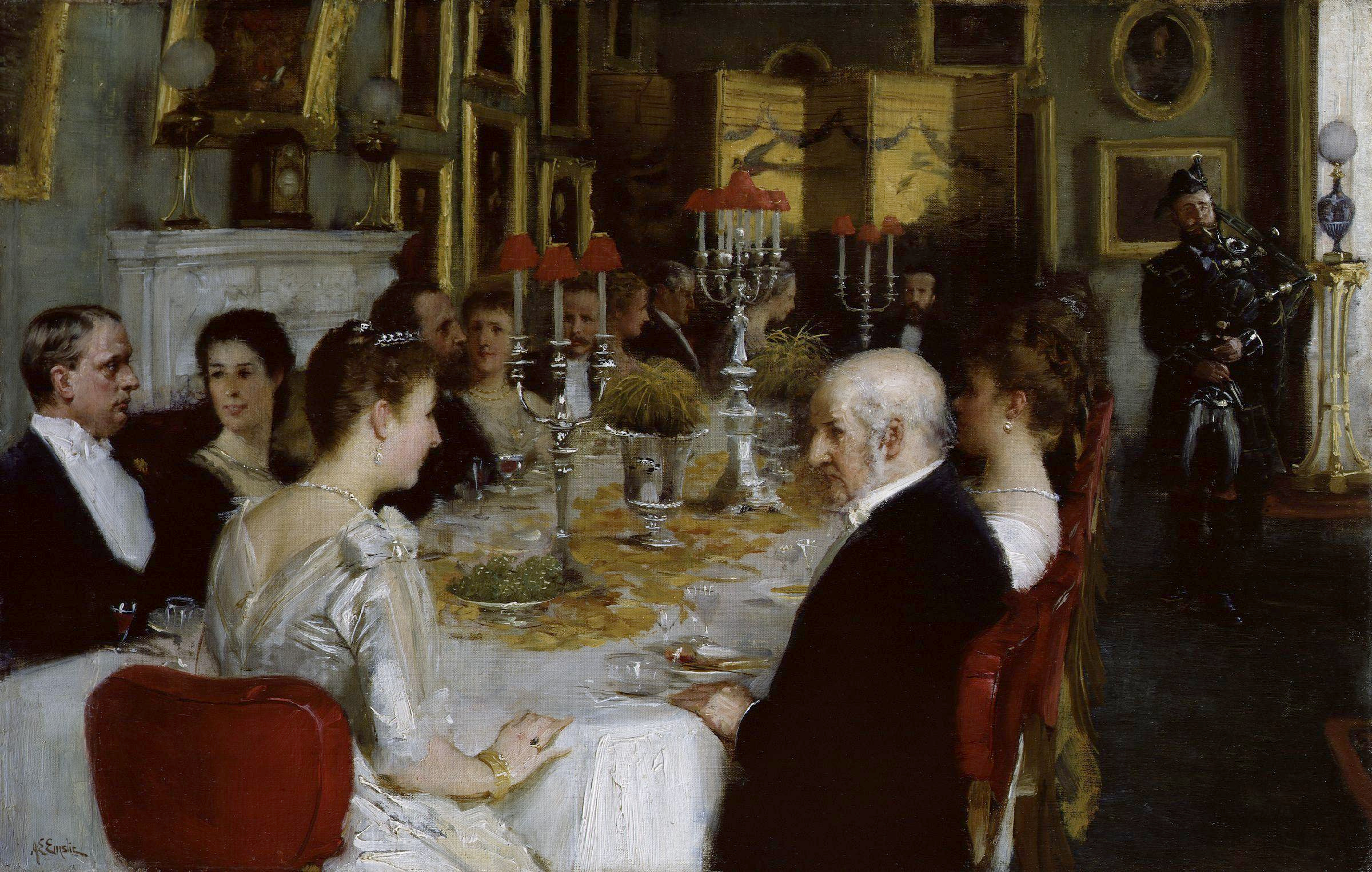
Dinner at Haddo House (1884) by Alfred Edward Emslie

The development of the Palladian country house in the seventeenth century separated the family of the householder from the servants. Previously sharing the hall, and bedding down at a master's feet, or door, servants were now given separate small chambers. Sometimes these were placed on a mezzanine floor, as at Kinross. Servants were less visible, using backstairs that kept them away from members of the family and guests and they fulfilled necessary and sometimes unpleasant tasks. They were also fewer in number, of lower social status and predominately female. A country house could have 10 to 20 servants and large houses had more. A hierarchy of positions developed from the butler and housekeeper to footmen and maids. The sexes were increasingly segregated into their own quarters.

Relatively isolated, gentry families spent much of their time visiting family, friends or neighbours. As a result, hospitality was an important part of life. Leisure activities pursued by the gentry included hunting, cards and chess. Music remained important in noble houses, with accounts listing professional musicians hired to entertain the family and guests. However, professional musicians were expensive to maintain. In the eighteenth century members of the household often provided musical entertainment on the harpsichord, organ and piano. House libraries often contained considerable quantities of music, as at Dalkeith Palace, where the Duke of Buccleuch's daughter collected vocal music between 1780 and 1800. In the nineteenth century it was the women of the family who were the chief performers and men were not expected to play the piano in drawing rooms.

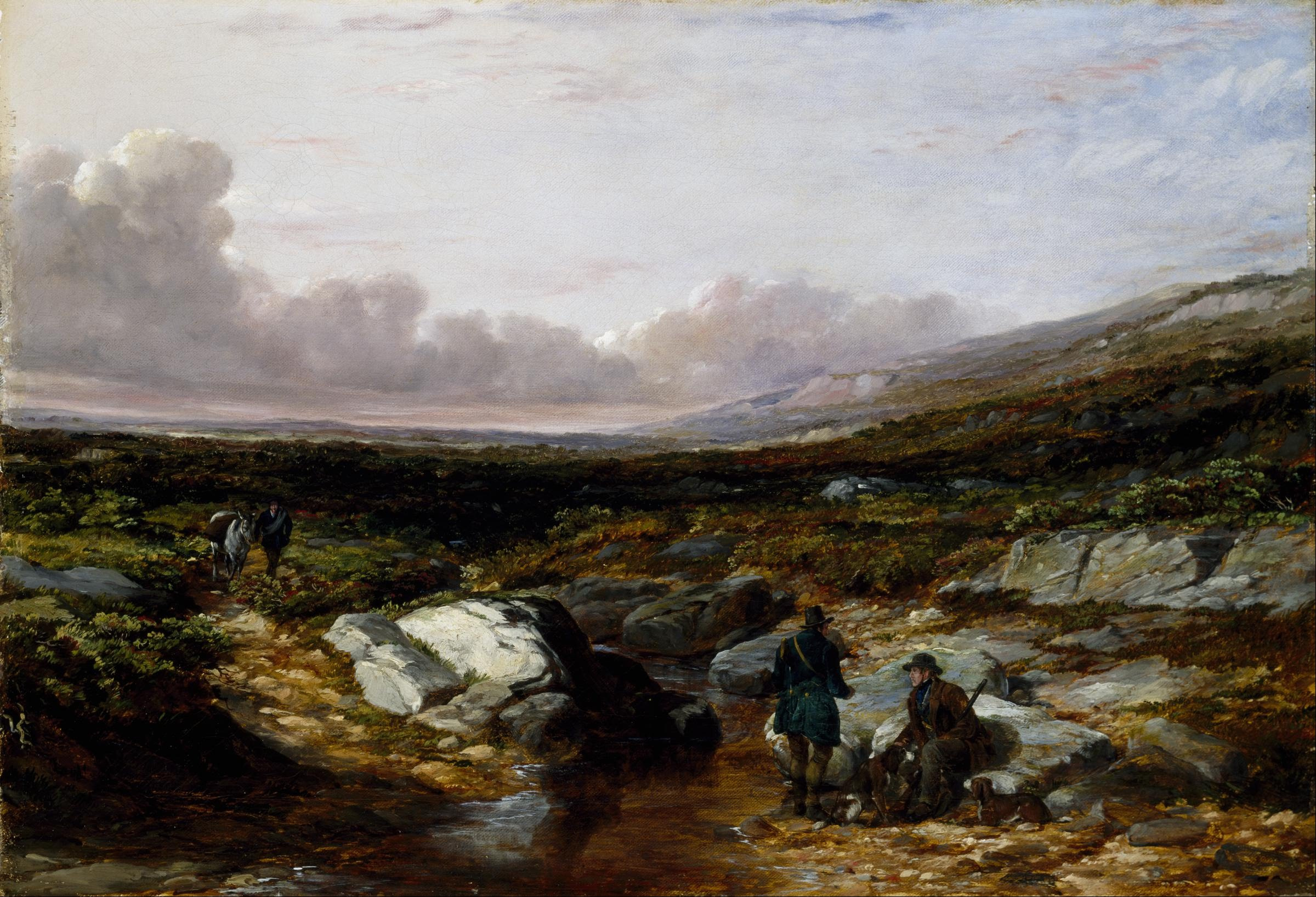
Deer Stalking in Scotland: Getting Ready by Arthur Fitzwilliam Tait (1851)

The consumption of large and sumptuous meals was an important part of social life. Some were elaborately planned, others the result of unexpected guests. These usually consisted of three or four courses, with a variety of dishes served in each course, from which the diner was expected to select. In the eighteenth century service was à la française, where all the dishes were impressively displayed on tables at the same time, until the advent of service à la russe in the nineteenth century, when they were served sequentially. Alcohol in various forms and toasts were an important part of formal dining, and until the Regency era, dessert and drinks were often taken in a separate dessert room.

In the eighteenth century, estate houses were designed as centres of public display, but in the nineteenth century they became increasingly private. The first family wing in Britain was added to Blairquhan Castle in Ayrshire in 1820 by the architect William Burn and the style became characteristic of the Victorian country house. From the 1830s distinct male areas of the house began to emerge, to which the men could withdraw and indulge in "masculine" conversation and activities, centred on the smoking and billiard rooms. From the 1870s gun rooms began to be added, mainly to cater for weapons for hunting weekends. The popularity of salmon fishing, deer stalking and grouse shooting, particularly in the Highlands, was confirmed by Queen Victoria's purchase of the hunting lodge at Balmoral. It rapidly expanded as southern industrialists and businessmen began to see the sports offered by Scottish estates as a status symbol, such as the Spelsbury family at Dunmavarie in the 1920s. Large areas of land were designated for hunting and hunting parties became a major part of the life of the Scottish estate house. There were also a wider range of activities that developed in the nineteenth century for members of the leisured classes, such as croquet, lawn tennis, billiards, carriage rides, charades, and amateur dramatics.

== Current ownership ==
In the twentieth century, as the finances and needs of the landed classes changed, many surviving country houses were sold and became boarding schools, hospitals, spa retreats, conference centres and hotels. The National Trust for Scotland (founded in 1931) cares for post-medieval castles and estate houses that were still in occupation until the twentieth century and are open to the public. Historic Scotland (created as an agency in 1991) cares for over 300 properties, which are publicly accessible. The Landmark Trust restores and operates historic buildings as holiday homes.

== See also ==
- English country house
- Listed building
- Listed buildings in Scotland
- List of country houses in the United Kingdom
