= Mary Monica Maxwell-Scott =

Scottish author

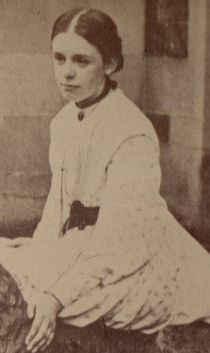
Mary Monica Maxwell-Scott in her youth

The Hon. Mary Monica Maxwell-Scott (2 October 1852 – 15 March 1920) was a Scottish author of historical novels and non-fiction and the great-granddaughter of the novelist Walter Scott.

== Early life ==
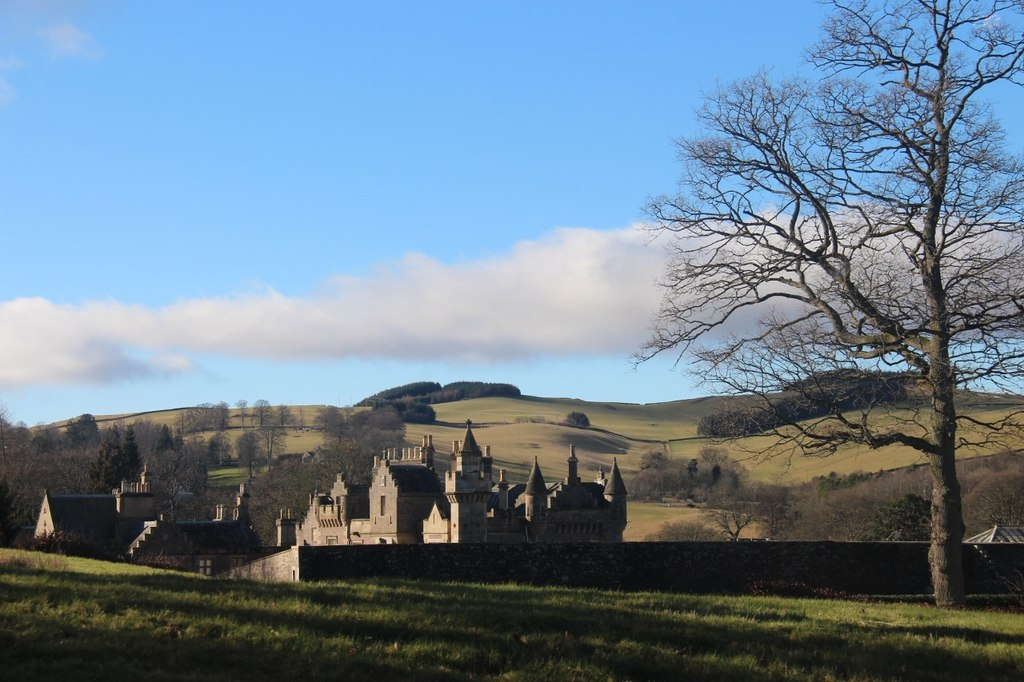
Abbotsford, Scottish Borders

She was born in Tunbridge Wells in Kent as Mary Monica Hope Scott in 1852, the only surviving child of James Hope-Scott (1812–1873) and his wife Charlotte Harriet Jane née Lockhart (1827–1858), daughter of John Gibson Lockhart and grand-daughter of the noted Scottish novelist Sir Walter Scott. Until her own children were born Mary Monica was the only living descendant of Sir Walter Scott.

== Career ==
In 1868, as the heir to her father, she applied for a loan of £2,000 to have the land at Abbotsford House drained; as a minor she received her father's consent for the loan. On the death of her father in 1873 she inherited Abbotsford House, the home of Walter Scott.

Like her great-grandfather, she became a writer of historical books. She also wrote a number of books about her famous ancestor including an authoritative guide to Scott’s collection of 'gabions' titled Abbotsford: a Guide to the Personal Relics and Possessions of Sir Walter Scott.

== Personal life ==
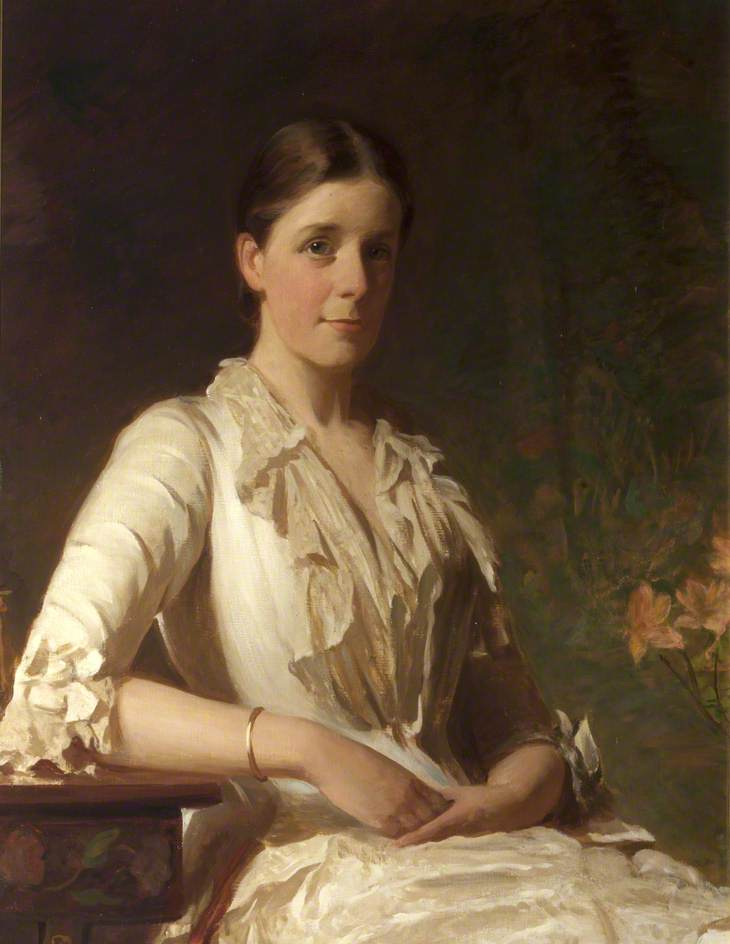
Portrait of The Hon. Mrs Mary Maxwell-Scott by William Edwards Miller, 1874

In London in 1874 she married the Hon. Joseph Constable-Maxwell, third son of William, Lord Herries, following which the couple adopted the surname Maxwell-Scott. Together, they were the parents of eight children, five of whom survived her, including:

- Margaret Mary Lucy Constable-Maxwell-Scott (d. 1912)
- Sir Walter Constable-Maxwell-Scott, 1st Baronet (1875–1954), a Maj.-Gen.
- Mary Josephine Constable-Maxwell-Scott (1876–1922), who married Alexander Dalglish in 1897.
- Winifride Mary Josephine Constable-Maxwell-Scott (1878–1880)
- Joseph Michael Constable-Maxwell-Scott (1880–1911)
- Malcolm Raphael Joseph Constable-Maxwell-Scott (1883–1943), a Rear-Admiral.
- Alice Mary Josephine Constable-Maxwell-Scott (1885–1908)
- Herbert Francis Joseph Constable-Maxwell-Scott (1891–1962)

Maxwell-Scott died at 7 Egerton Terrace in London in 1920, aged 67. On her death in 1920 her eldest son, Walter, inherited Abbotsford House.

=== Descendants ===
She was a grandmother of Patricia Maxwell-Scott (1921–1998) and Dame Jean Mary Monica Maxwell-Scott (1923–2004).

== Publications include ==
- Catalogue of the Armour & Antiquities at Abbotsford (editor), Edinburgh, (1888)
- Abbotsford: The Personal Relics and Antiquarian Treasures of Sir Walter Scott (1893)
- The Tragedy of Fotheringay, A. & C. Black, London (1895)
- The Making of Abbotsford, and Incidents in Scottish History, Drawn from Various Sources (1897)
- Henry Schomberg Kerr: Sailor and Jesuit, Longmans & Co, London (1901)
- Alfred the Great, Catholic Truth Society, London (1902)
- Joan of Arc, Sands & Co, London & Edinburgh (1905)
- Gabriel Garcia Moreno (1908)
- Madame Elizabeth de France, 1764–1794, Edward Arnold, London (1908)
- The Life of Madame de la Rochejaquelein, Longmans & Co, London (1911)
- Thoughts on the Holy Angels. Selected by Hon. Mrs. Maxwell-Scott, Catholic Truth Society, London (1912)
- St. Francis de Sales and his Friends, Sands & Co, London & Edinburgh (1913)
- The Teresa of Canada, London (1915)
- Mary, Queen of Scots, Catholic Truth Society, London (1935).
