= Patricia Maxwell-Scott =

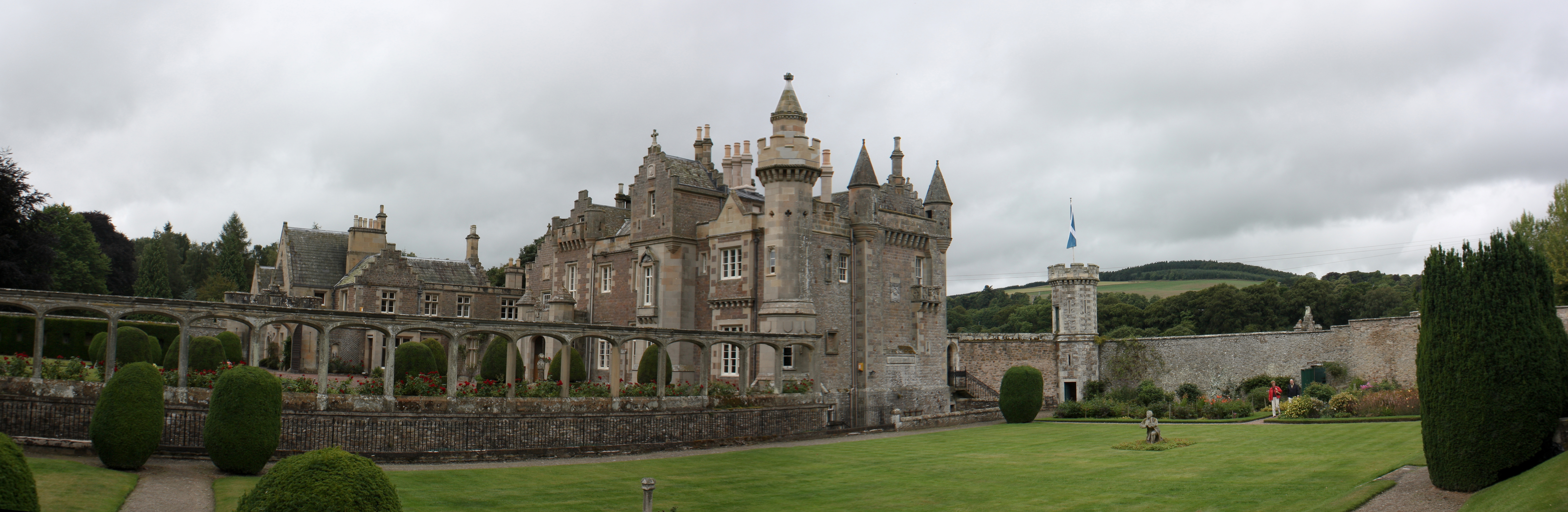
Abbotsford House as seen from the gardens

Patricia Maxwell-Scott (3 April 1921 – 13 October 1998) was the Laird and Chatelaine of Abbotsford which she opened to the public, restored to its former glory, and ran for nearly five decades. She was "Borders Man of the Year" in 1983, and the great-great-great-granddaughter of the novelist Sir Walter Scott. Her younger sister was Dame Jean Maxwell-Scott DCVO, who never married.

== Early life ==
Patricia Maxwell-Scott was born on 3 April 1921 in The Curragh, Dublin, the granddaughter of Mary Monica Maxwell-Scott and the elder daughter of Major-General Sir Walter Constable-Maxwell-Scott, 1st Baronet, and his first wife, Mairi, daughter of Lt-Col Stewart of Lunga. Her mother died when she was three. When she was seven, her father married Marie-Louise, Madame des Sincay, daughter of Major John Logan of the US Cavalry. She and her sister were both educated at the Convent Des Oiseaux, Westgate-on-Sea, Kent.

== Career ==
She inherited Abbotsford, near Galashiels, Roxburghshire upon her father's death in 1954, and ran the house as a visitor attraction for the rest of her life.

== Personal life ==
In 1944, she married Sir (Harold Hugh) Christian Boulton, 4th Baronet, although they had no children and later separated. She retained her maiden name.
