= Jean Maxwell-Scott =

Lady-in-waiting to Princess Alice

Dame Jean Mary Monica Maxwell-Scott, DCVO (8 June 1923 – 5 May 2004) was the Laird and Chatelaine of Abbotsford which she and her elder sister, Patricia Maxwell-Scott, opened to the public, restored to its former glory, and ran for nearly five decades. She was the great-great-great-granddaughter of the novelist Sir Walter Scott, and on her death was his last direct descendant to live in Abbotsford. She was lady-in-waiting to Princess Alice, Duchess of Gloucester, from 1959 to 2004.

== Early life ==
Jean Maxwell-Scott was born on 8 June 1923 at Abbotsford, near Galashiels, Roxburghshire, the granddaughter of Mary Monica Maxwell-Scott and the younger daughter of Major-General Sir Walter Constable-Maxwell-Scott, 1st Baronet, and his first wife Mairi, daughter of Lt-Col Stewart of Lunga. Her mother died when she was 15 months old. When she was five, her father married Marie-Louise, Madame des Sincay, daughter of Major John Logan of the US Cavalry. Jean was educated at the Convent Des Oiseaux, Westgate-on-Sea, Kent.

== Career ==
Her sister inherited Abbotsford on their father's death in 1954, and ran the house as a visitor attraction for the rest of her life. They did not install electricity until 1962. One or both of the sisters would greet parties themselves. In the 1960s, they had 50,000 visitors a year, peaking in the 1980s at 86,000.

Not long before she died, she bemoaned the ignorance of visitors to the house:

"Only the Russians and eastern Europeans seem to read any Scott at school ... Now it's sometimes, 'Where are his Antarctic things?' Occasionally one has to be terribly tactful."

In 1959, she was appointed lady-in-waiting to Princess Alice, Duchess of Gloucester, who lived nearby, a role she held until her death in 2004.

== Patricia Maxwell-Scott ==
Dame Jean's elder sister Patricia was born in Ireland at the Curragh, the British military complex outside Dublin, at a time when the sisters' father was a serving soldier, immersed in the Troubles in Ireland. When she died in 2002, her will was found to include a clause specifying that she must "adopt and use" the surname of Scott of Abbotsford, if she was to inherit the house. Dame Jean was mystified and had no idea of such a clause, but duly complied. Her horse, "Sir Wattie", which she co-owned with Susan Luczyc-Wykorski, was ridden by Ian Stark at the 1984 Summer Olympics in Seoul, winning two silver medals.

== Death ==
Dame Jean Maxwell-Scott died at Abbotsford, Roxburghshire on 5 May 2004, aged 80. Patricia had been briefly married; Jean never married and neither sister had children.

== Honours ==
She was made Commander of the Royal Victorian Order at the 1969 Birthday Honours, then Dame Commander of the Royal Victorian Order (DCVO) in the 1984 Birthday Honours.

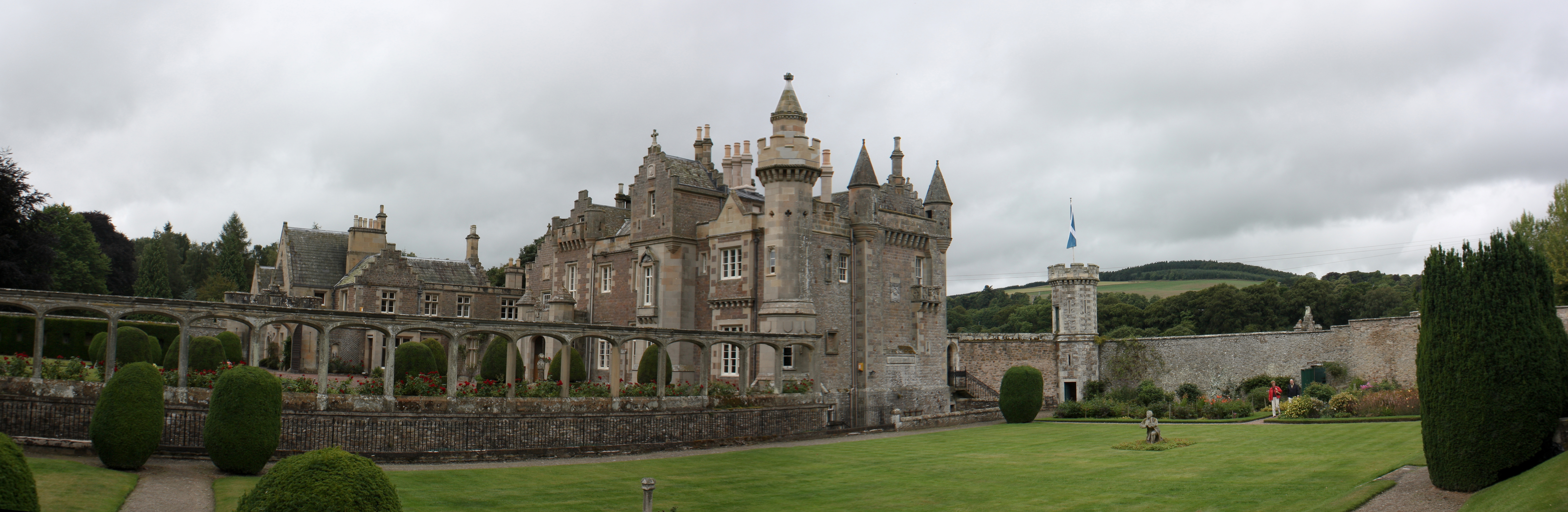
Abbotsford House as seen from the gardens
