= Abbotsford Club =

The Abbotsford Club was a text publication society founded in Edinburgh in 1833 or 1834. This was shortly after the death of Sir Walter Scott (in September 1832), whose residence of Abbotsford House gave the society its name, and whose literature the club's publications sought to illuminate. The club was modelled on the Roxburghe Club, of which Scott himself had been a member, as well as the Bannatyne Club, which was founded by Scott, and the Glasgow-centred Maitland Club. The founder and first secretary of the club was William Barclay Turnbull, a young Edinburgh lawyer. The stated objective of the Abbotsford Club was "the printing of Miscellaneous Pieces, illustrative of History, Literature, and Antiquities". Through its publishing activity, the club did much to promote the proliferation of Middle English literature. The Abbotsford Club effectively ceased publication in 1866.

The club was housed at 25 Great King Street in Edinburgh's Second New Town.

The complete publications of the Abbotsford Club are available online from the National Library of Scotland.
