= William Barclay Turnbull =

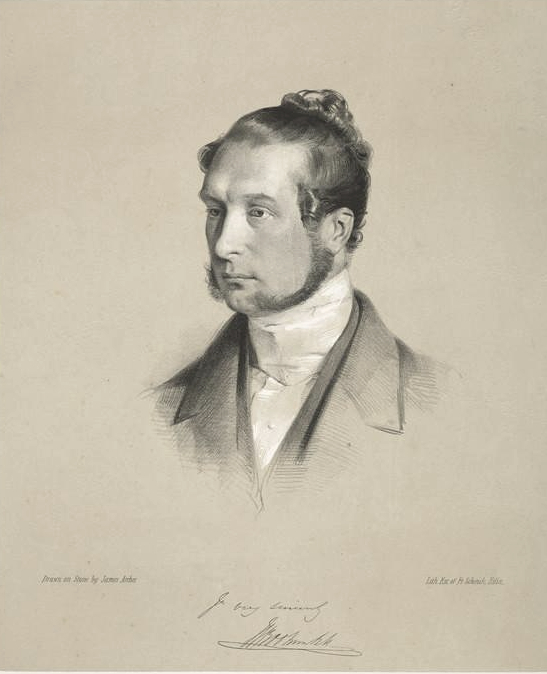
William Barclay Turnbull, lithograph by Schenck

William Barclay David Donald Turnbull (1811–1863) was a Scottish antiquary and archivist.

== Life ==
Born in Edinburgh, Turnbull studied law, and was admitted as an advocate at the Scottish bar 1832, but devoted much time to the study of the antiquities and older literature of Great Britain. In 1834, he founded the Abbotsford Club, which preserved manuscripts and old editions of written material.

Turnbull's family belonged to the Church of Scotland; he joined the Scottish Episcopalian Church. In 1843 he became a Roman Catholic. In 1859 he was employed by the Record Commission, but on account his religion he was attacked by the Protestant Alliance, Religious Tract Society and Scottish Reformation Society. Finding support from Lord Romilly, Master of the Rolls and in legal and academic circles, but encountering also little appetite among politicians for a confrontation with the militancy of anti-Catholics, he felt compelled to resign in 1861. He died in 1863.

== Works ==
Turnbull was a scholarly editor, who produced editions of Middle English and early modern English poetry. His work as genealogist and historical editor was of value. Among his publications were:

- The Romance of Sir Guy of Warwick and Rembrun his Son (1840)
- The Visions of Tundale (1843)
- Letters of Mary Queen of Scots (1845)
- The Poetical Works of William Drummond of Hawthornden (1856)
