= Thomas Warrender =

Scottish artist (fl. 1673–1713)

Thomas Warrender (26 January 1662–fl.1713) was a Scottish artist best known for a trompe-l'œil Still Life of a letter rack, probably painted around 1708, which is now in the collection of the Scottish National Gallery.

== Life ==
The son of John Warrender and Agnes Heamonie, Thomas Warrender was born in Haddington on 26 January 1662.

Warrender mainly worked as a decorative painter, and his Still Life indicates he came from Haddington, East Lothian, Scotland and was a burgess and guild-member both in Haddington and Edinburgh. He was active in Edinburgh, seemingly participating in the political debates of the time as well as painting. He may also have taught the painter James Norie (1684–1757) whose work resembled Warrender's.

== Still Life ==
The Still Life depicts a number of pamphlets and newspapers pinned to a board, along with writing material. It bears a strong resemblance to similar works by the Dutch artist Evert Collier. Marion Amblard suggests that Warrender would have seen work by Collier in the collections of wealthy Scots. Dror Wahrman considers it a copy of Collier, and suggests the date of the work - 1708 at the earliest based on dated printed material shown in the picture - means it was painted after Collier's last known work. The work seems to allude to contemporary political issues, such as the 1707 Act of Union between Scotland and England, symbolised by overlapping playing cards, and refers disparagingly to Roman Catholicism, by reference to the National Covenant and the dangers of popery.

John Walter sees the work as demonstrating changes in British society from the late seventeenth century, with the increasing availability of printed material leading to growing debate in print.
