= Josephine Ward =

British writer

- Born: Josephine Mary Hope-Scott; 18 May 1864; Norfolk House, St James's Square, Westminster, London, England
- Died: 20 November 1932 (aged 68)
- Spouse: Wilfrid Ward (m. 1887; died 1916)
- Children: 5, including Maisie Ward
- Father: James Hope-Scott
- Relatives: Minna O'Conor (sister); James Hope, 1st Baron Rankeillour (brother); Mary Monica Maxwell-Scott (half-sister); Frank Sheed (son-in-law); Wilfrid Sheed (grandson); Augusta Fitzalan-Howard, Duchess of Norfolk (grandmother); Henry Fitzalan-Howard, 14th Duke of Norfolk (grandfather); Alexander Hope (grandfather)

Josephine Mary Ward (née Hope-Scott, formerly Hope; 18 May 1864 – 20 November 1932), known by the pen name Mrs Wilfrid Ward, was a British novelist and nonfiction writer whose works were informed by her Roman Catholic faith. She published ten novels and a novella, including One Poor Scruple (1899), Out of Due Time (1906), The Job Secretary (1911) and Tudor Sunset (1932). Her novels were generally well received during her lifetime, but fell into obscurity after her death. Some of her fiction has been reprinted in the 21st century. She also wrote articles and religious tracts, and edited her husband Wilfrid Ward's lectures for publication. She provided the initial finance for the Catholic publishing house Sheed and Ward, founded by her daughter Maisie Ward and her husband.

== Biography ==
Ward was born Josephine Mary Hope-Scott on 18 May 1864 at Norfolk House, St James's Square to James Hope-Scott, a barrister, Tractarian and catholic convert, and Lady Victoria Alexandrina Fitzalan-Howard (1840–1870). The paternal granddaughter of the army officer Alexander Hope, through her mother Hope-Scott was the granddaughter of Henry Fitzalan-Howard, 14th Duke of Norfolk and Augusta Fitzalan-Howard, Duchess of Norfolk. One of four surviving siblings, Hope-Scott was the sister of the writer Minna O'Conor the politician James Hope, 1st Baron Rankeillour and the younger half-sister of the writer Mary Monica Maxwell-Scott. Following her father's death in 1873, Hope-Scott and her four siblings were adopted by their maternal grandmother. Whilst living with their grandmother, the sibling's surname was reverted to their father's original surname of Hope.

Raised at Arundel Castle, Hope received an informal education. Following the marriage of her uncle Henry Fitzalan-Howard, 15th Duke of Norfolk to Flora Fitzalan-Howard, Duchess of Norfolk in 1877, the family moved to Heron's Ghyll where Hope was educated more formally by three local Corsican sisters.

First meeting her future husband the biographer and ecclesiastical historian Wilfrid Ward in 1884, Hope turned down Ward's first proposal of marriage. On 24 November 1887, Hope and Ward married. Both were Roman Catholics, and both their fathers had converted to the church. The couple had five children: the eldest was the writer and publisher, Maisie Ward (1889–1975); their other daughter was also a writer; and Leo Ward (1894–1942), one of their three sons, was a missionary priest. The family lived at Freshwater, Isle of Wight, then briefly at Hampstead, and then at Eastbourne in East Sussex, before settling in 1901 at Dorking in Surrey. Their circle included many prominent Catholics, including Cardinal Newman and Cardinal Manning, intellectuals such as T. H. Huxley, and literary figures, including G. K. Chesterton, Hilaire Belloc and the Tennyson family.

Ward was an opponent of women's suffrage. She was involved with the Catholic Evidence Guild, co-founded by Maisie, and was a member of the Catholic Women's League. She chaired the Women Writers' Dinner. During the First World War, she served with the Catholic Soldiers' Association, and allowed the house in Dorking to be used by injured servicemen.

Some time after Wilfrid Ward's death in 1916, Ward moved to London where she lived with her daughter Maisie. When Maisie married Frank Sheed in 1926, Ward supplied the money for them to establish the Catholic publishing house, Sheed and Ward. Maisie later wrote that the idea of founding a Catholic publisher had come from her mother.

Josephine Ward died in Mayfair on 20 November 1932. She was buried at Freshwater on the Isle of Wight, and commemorated in a service at the Brompton Oratory in London. Maisie Ward describes her life, as well as that of her husband, in her two-volume biography, The Wilfrid Wards and the Transition (1934) and Insurrection versus Resurrection (1937).

== Writings ==
All Ward's works addressed a religious theme in some form, and she particularly focused on the conflict between personal wishes and the Church. She was particularly concerned with elucidating character, writing in a 1908 article that "the greatest drama is the unfolding of the action of the will as it adheres to or thwarts the Divine purpose". Maisie Ward describes her mother's characters as "frank" depictions of "very faulty humans". Her obituarist for The Times notes her "imagination, wit, taste, style, and the power of drawing character". The academic Peter C. Erb, writing in 1999, describes her a "realist" with a "sense of humour".

=== Early works and One Poor Scruple ===
Her first major published work, the novella In The Way (1887), pre-dated her marriage, and was attributed to "J.H." It recounted the life of the rural poor in Sussex. She published a biography of Saint Anselm with the Catholic Truth Society in 1893. Ward was later dismissive of her earliest works, considering that marriage and family life had improved her writing.

Her first novel, One Poor Scruple, published in 1899, was a rapid success. It is a romance that focuses on the issue of marriage to someone who has been divorced, which was not permitted by the Catholic Church. Her obituarist for The Times describes the novel as "beautifully written, full of delicate observation and human sympathy". It appeared a year after Mary Augusta Ward's popular novel, Helbeck of Bannisdale, and was seen by some contemporary reviewers as a rebuttal of the earlier work. Ward herself tried to refute this notion, stating in the novel's introduction that parts had been in progress for more than seven years. The literary scholar Bernard Bergonzi, writing on the centenary of its publication, characterises One Poor Scruple as "an early example of what was later described as the 'Catholic novel'", as written by Graham Greene, Evelyn Waugh and David Lodge. He points out that Ward's background meant she was able to present a more authentic picture of the Catholic gentry than Waugh in Brideshead Revisited.

=== 1903 to 1913 ===
After settling in Dorking, Ward published prolifically as "Mrs Wilfrid Ward". Her second novel, The Light Behind, came out in 1903. A contemporary review in The New York Times praises the novel's "original" plot and lively, realistic characterisations; it describes the author as showing "a breadth, a tolerance, a heartfelt piety". Out of Due Time followed in 1906, and addresses the subject of a progressive individual who comes into conflict with the Church; the poet Alfred Noyes characterises it as a "study of the modernist mind at war with itself". Perry Worden, in a contemporary New York Times review, hails the novel a "masterpiece of fiction" that "handles a difficult subject with rare tact and courtesy", despite being "a bit too heavily freighted with its theology". Erb, writing in 1999, sees autobiographical elements in the heroine.

Great Possessions (1909) draws sympathetic portraits of Church of England clergymen; Erb describes it as expressing the author's "delight in ambiguity". The partly "surrealistic" The Job Secretary (1911) employs metafictional techniques in a story about failed marriages. George Wyndham describes it as "angelically clever", and Noyes compares it with the work of Henry James. Erb describes it as exploring the "links between fiction and reality" and the "nature of human consciousness and time" via a writer protagonist. Horace Blake (1913), her last work before the First World War, is described in her Times obituary as an "ambitious attempt" to depict a great man who falls morally, and the effect on his relatives and friends.

=== Post-war novels ===
Not Known Here (1921) is set just before the war; the "beautifully realized" protagonist finds out cruelly that his deceased father was German. Ward published two novels set after the war, addressing morale problems. A Plague of His Own Heart (1925) is described in her Times obituary as less successful than its predecessor. The Shadow of Mussolini (1927) grew out of a trip to Italy; according to Erb, it expresses "some hope" for Mussolini.

Her final work, the historical novel Tudor Sunset (1932), is set during the end of Elizabeth I's reign, and focuses on the persecution of Catholics. Herbert Gorman, in a contemporary review for The New York Times, describes it as "vividly conceived and historically accurate", while noting its inherent bias. Erb describes the novel as representing a deliberate "fusion of historical, biographical, and literary genres".

=== Reception and nonfiction works ===
Ward's novels were generally well received in her lifetime. The year after her death, three of her novels (One Poor Scruple, Out of Due Time and The Job Secretary) were reprinted by Sheed and Ward, prefaced by an "appreciation" by Noyes. Later in the 20th century, her novels fell into obscurity, and in 1999 were noted as having received limited coverage by literary critics. Interest in them revived in the 21st century, leading to some of them being reprinted.

She also wrote articles for The Spectator and the Dublin Review, as well as religious tracts for the Catholic Truth Society, including one on Catholic marriage. She edited Wilfrid Ward's lectures for publication after his death, and compiled a biographical introduction.

== Bibliography ==
Fiction

- In The Way (novella; Burns & Oates; 1887)
- One Poor Scruple: A Seven Weeks' Story (Longmans, Green; 1899)
- The Light Behind (John Lane: The Bodley Head; 1903)
- Out of Due Time (Longmans, Green; 1906)
- Great Possessions (Longmans, Green; 1909)
- The Job Secretary (Longmans, Green; 1911)
- Horace Blake (G. P. Putnam's; 1913)
- Not Known Here (Hutchinson; 1921)
- A Plague of His Own Heart (Hutchinson; 1925)
- The Shadow of Mussolini (Sheed and Ward; 1927)
- Tudor Sunset (Sheed and Ward; 1932)

Selected nonfiction

- Plots and Persons in Fiction. Dublin Review 143: 304 (1908)
- Marriage: A Dialogue on the Christian Ideal (Catholic Truth Society; 1924)

As editor

- Last Lectures (by Wilfrid Ward)
