= Wilfrid Ward =

English biographer and ecclesiastical historian (1856–1916)

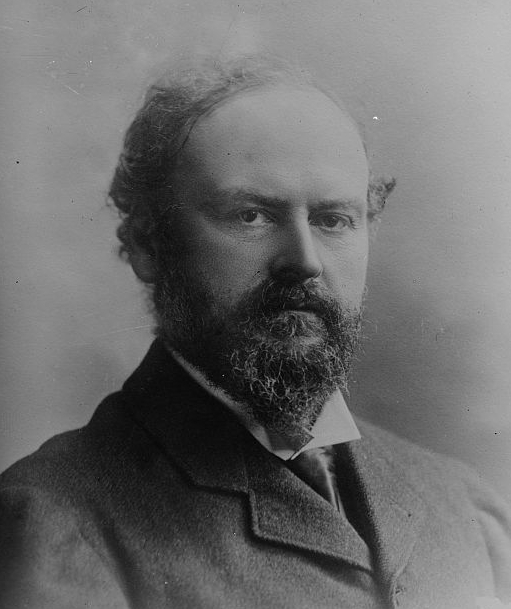
- Born: Wilfrid Philip Ward; 2 January 1856; Old Hall House, Old Hall Green, Hertfordshire, England
- Died: 9 April 1916 (aged 60); London, England
- Education: External University of London; Catholic University College; English College, Rome (didn't graduate); Ushaw College (didn't graduate)
- Spouse: Josephine Ward (m. 1887)
- Children: 5, including Maisie Ward
- Father: William George Ward
- Relatives: Bernard Ward (brother); Frank Sheed (son-in-law); Minna O'Conor (sister-in-law); James Hope, 1st Baron Rankeillour (brother-in-law); Mary Monica Maxwell-Scott (sister-in-law); James Hope-Scott (father-in-law); Wilfrid Sheed (nephew); William Ward (grandfather)

Wilfrid Philip Ward (2 January 1856 – 9 April 1916) was an English Catholic biographer and ecclesiastical historian. Ward and his friend Baron Friedrich von Hügel have been described as "the two leading lay English Catholic thinkers of their generation".

== Early life and education ==
Ward was born on 2 January 1856 at Old Hall House, Old Hall Green in the grounds of St. Edmund's College to Catholic converts William George Ward, a theologian, philosopher and lecturer at St. Edmund's College, and Frances Ward (née Wingfield; c. 1816–1898). Through his father, Ward was the paternal grandson of the cricketer and banker William Ward. The godson of Augusta Fitzalan-Howard, Duchess of Norfolk, a supporter of Brompton Oratory and maternal grandmother of his future wife Josephine Ward, he was named after St. Wilfrid and St. Philip Neri. One of eight siblings, Ward was the brother of the Dame Laurentia Ward (née Agnes Ward; died 1921), the Abbess of Oulton Abbey, and the historian and Bishop of Brentwood Bernard Ward.

Educated at Downside School and St. Edmund's College, Ward enrolled at the External University of London in 1872 and later graduated with his Bachelor's in 1876. Ward also enrolled at Catholic University College in 1874, where he studied philosophy under Father Robert Francis Clarke. With the intention of joining the priesthood, Ward enrolled on the advice of Herbert Vaughan at the English College in 1877. Returning to England in 1878 due to ill health, he continue his studies at Ushaw College where he was the choirmaster and wrote the music for the operetta The Gambler of Metz. Leaving before his ordination in 1881, Ward initially wanted to become a opera singer. For a brief period he reluctantly studied at the Inner Temple to become a barrister.

== Career ==
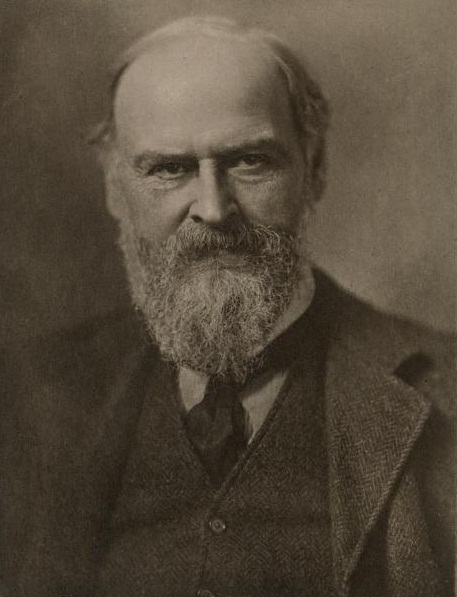
Wilfrid Ward, Photographed by F. S. Clark, n.d.

Ward viewed his occupation as advancing English Catholic intellectual life. In 1885 Ward became a lecturer on philosophy at Ushaw. In 1889, Ward published a biography of his father, William George Ward and the Oxford Movement. This proving successful, he then wrote William George Ward and the Catholic Revival,. Cardinal Herbert Vaughan then invited Ward to write a biography of the late Cardinal Nicholas Wiseman. This was followed in 1912 by a two-volume biography of John Henry Newman.

In 1890 Ward was appointed examiner in Mental and Moral Philosophy to the Royal University of Ireland. He lectured at Lowell Institute, Boston in 1914.

From 1906 to 1915, Ward edited the Dublin Review. During his tenure, the journal published articles by G. K. Chesterton, Hilaire Belloc, Francis Thompson and other well-known writers. Ward believed very strongly that Catholics should be involved in the affairs of the nation He also contributed to publications such as the Edinburgh Review, Quarterly Review and Contemporary Review.

== Personal life ==
Ward married Josephine Hope, a novelist and Roman Catholic laywoman, on 24 November 1887. The couple initially lived at Freshwater, Isle of Wight, then briefly at Hampstead, and then at Eastbourne in East Sussex, before settling in 1901 at Dorking in Surrey. They had five children. The eldest, Mary Josephine "Maisie" married Frank Sheed and together founded the publishing house Sheed and Ward.

Ward died in London on 9 April 1916.

== Works ==
- William George Ward and the Oxford Movement, Macmillan & Co., 1893 [1st Pub. 1889].
- William George Ward and the Catholic Revival, Macmillan & Co., 1893 [second edition 1912.
- Witnesses to the Unseen, and Other Essays Macmillan & Co., 1893.
- The Life and Times of Nicholas Wiseman, Longmans, Green & Co., 1897.
- Problems and Persons, Longmans, Green, and Co., 1903
- Aubrey de Vere: A Memoir, Longmans, Green & Co., 1904.
- Ten Personal Studies, Longmans, Green, and Co., 1908.
- Life of John Henry, Cardinal Newman, Based on his Private Journals and Correspondence, Longmans, Green, and Co., 1912.
- The Oxford Movement, T.C. & E.C. Jack, 1912.
- Men and Matters, Longmans, Green & Co., 1914.
- Last Lectures of Wilfrid Ward, Longmans, Green & Co., 1918
