= George Barry Ford =

American Catholic priest (1885–1978)

Father George Barry Ford
- Church: Catholic Church

Orders
- Ordination: 1914

Personal details
- Born: October 28, 1885 Annsville, New York, U.S.
- Died: August 1, 1978 (aged 92) Manhattan, New York, U.S.
- Occupation: Priest
- Education: Niagara University (1908); St. Joseph's Seminary in Dunwoodie
- Notable work: A Degree of Difference (1969)

George Barry Ford (October 28, 1885 – August 1, 1978) was an American Roman Catholic priest, advocate of civil rights, and the chaplain who, along with Fr. Moore, led Thomas Merton to the Roman Catholic Church. He was twice silenced by Cardinal Francis Spellman, and was a close friend of Eleanor Roosevelt and Carlton J. H. Hayes. Dr. Henry P. Van Dusen, then president of Union Theological Seminary next to Ford's parish, Corpus Christi, described Father Ford as "the best known and best loved man in the Morningside Heights community".

Ford worked to establish the research institute and think tank Freedom House along with Eleanor Roosevelt, Wendell Willkie, Mayor Fiorello La Guardia, Elizabeth Cutter Morrow, Dorothy Thompson, Herbert Agar, Herbert Bayard Swope, Ralph Bunche, Roscoe Drummond, and Rex Stout. He also helped establish the Church Peace Union that today is the Carnegie Council for Ethics in International Affairs. Ford was a disciple of educational reformer John Dewey, who was a professor at Columbia's Teacher's College, and he eventually received the John Dewey Award.

Wilfrid Sheed, whose parents Frank Sheed and Maisie Ward of the Catholic publishing house Sheed & Ward attended the church, remembered him as "a famous liberal priest of the period," who was wordy, but with an "effulgent decency," who had an enormous effect on intellectuals of the era.

In 1938, Thomas Merton sought Ford out at Corpus Christi Church to seek instruction in the Catholic faith. That same year, when Servant of God Catherine Doherty, Baroness de Hueck, arrived in New York, he gave her free rent in Harlem, which was a key to her success in establishing Friendship House that became the birthplace of the future Madonna House Apostolate. He also contributed frequently to her support. In 1966 he served on the historic Ad hoc Commission on Rights of Soviet Jews. It was chaired by Bayard Rustin, and established by the Conference on the Status of Soviet Jews, offering a public tribunal on Jewish life in the Soviet Union. Ford was an early champion of the Catholic Ordination of Women.

Fr. Ford is thanked in the liner notes to George Carlin's 1972 album Class Clown, for although Carlin rejected the Catholic faith, he remembered Ford with appreciation, and credited him for teaching him how to ask questions and think.

== Honorary degrees ==
In 1954 Ford received an honorary Doctor of Humane Letters (L.H.D.) degree from Columbia University. He also received honorary degrees from Manhattan College and Seton Hall College.

== Controversies ==
He was criticized by many of his pro-Franco parishioners when he expressed his opposition to Francisco Franco and his regime. In the early 1940s he defended Father Divine against his critics, and Divine was the subject of a whole chapter in Ford's memoir, A Degree of Difference (Farrar, Straus & Giroux, 1969). Cardinal Francis Spellman famously upbraided him and silenced him for interfaith dialogue, and for being a character witness at a trial for a judge accused of conspiracy.

== Awards ==
- Congregation B'nai Jeshurun (1948)
- John Dewey Award of the New York Teachers Guild (1959)
- William J. Schieffelin Award of the Citizens Union of New York (1963)
- International Student Council (1964)
- National Conference of Christians and Jews, Brotherhood Award (1965)
- Honorary doctorates (see above)
