= Catherine Cecily O'Brien =

Australian Dominican sister and educationist

Catherine Cecily O'Brien OP
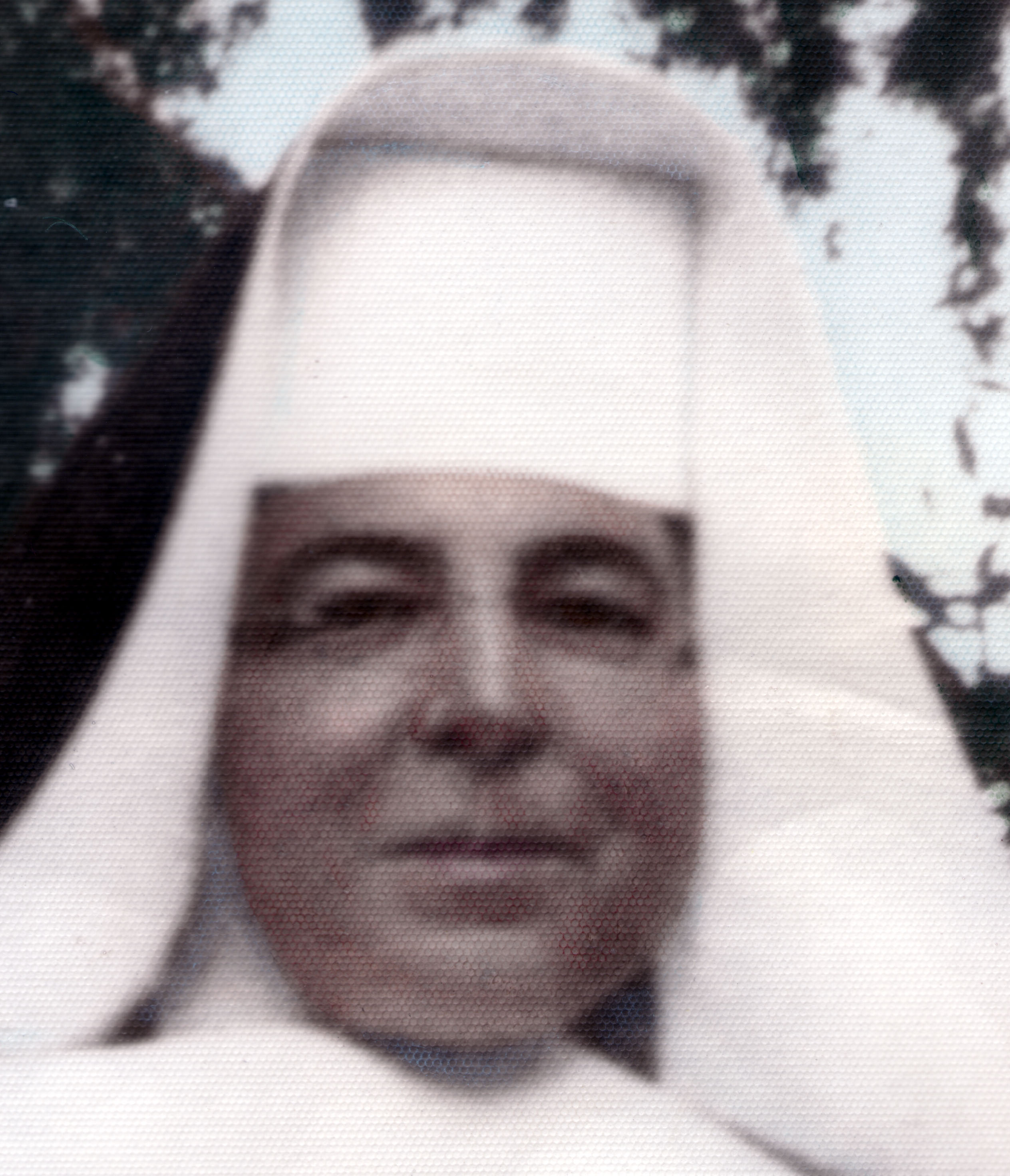
- Born: 25 October 1893 near Merriwa, New South Wales, Australia
- Died: 14 May 1945 (aged 51); Moss Vale, New South Wales, Australia
- Other name: Sister Mary Anselm
- Occupations: Educationist; Religious sister

Catherine Cecily O'Brien OP (1893–1945) was an Australian Dominican sister and educationist who was known for her innovative teaching methods and for being an advocate of quality education for girls.

== Biography ==
Catherine was born near Merriwa, New South Wales, to James Thomas O'Brien and his wife Catherine Cecily, nee Gleeson.

While initially educated at home, Catherine received her senior education at the Dominican Convent in Maitland, where she won a teacher-training scholarship. Catherine entered the same Dominican Convent in July 1914, received the habit in April 1915 and took the religious name of Sister Mary Anselm. She took her perpetual vows in 1917 and taught at the local secondary school in Maitland until 1920.

Because of her desire to attend university, Sister Mary Anselm moved to Santa Sabina Dominican Convent School in Strathfield in 1921. She attended the University of Sydney, graduating in 1924 with a Bachelor of Arts with first-class honours in English and Latin and the university medal for English. She continued her education, completing a diploma in education in 1925. In 1928 she obtained a Master of Arts in English literature, with first-class honours, completing a thesis titled "Tragedy in English Literature". From 1925 until 1945, Sister Mary Anselm taught English, Christian doctrine, French and Latin at Santa Sabina. One of her students was Mary Barr Mackinlay who she encouraged to study English Literature. In time, Mary Barr Mackinlay would be a leading teacher known as Sister Alphonse Marie.

== Legacy ==
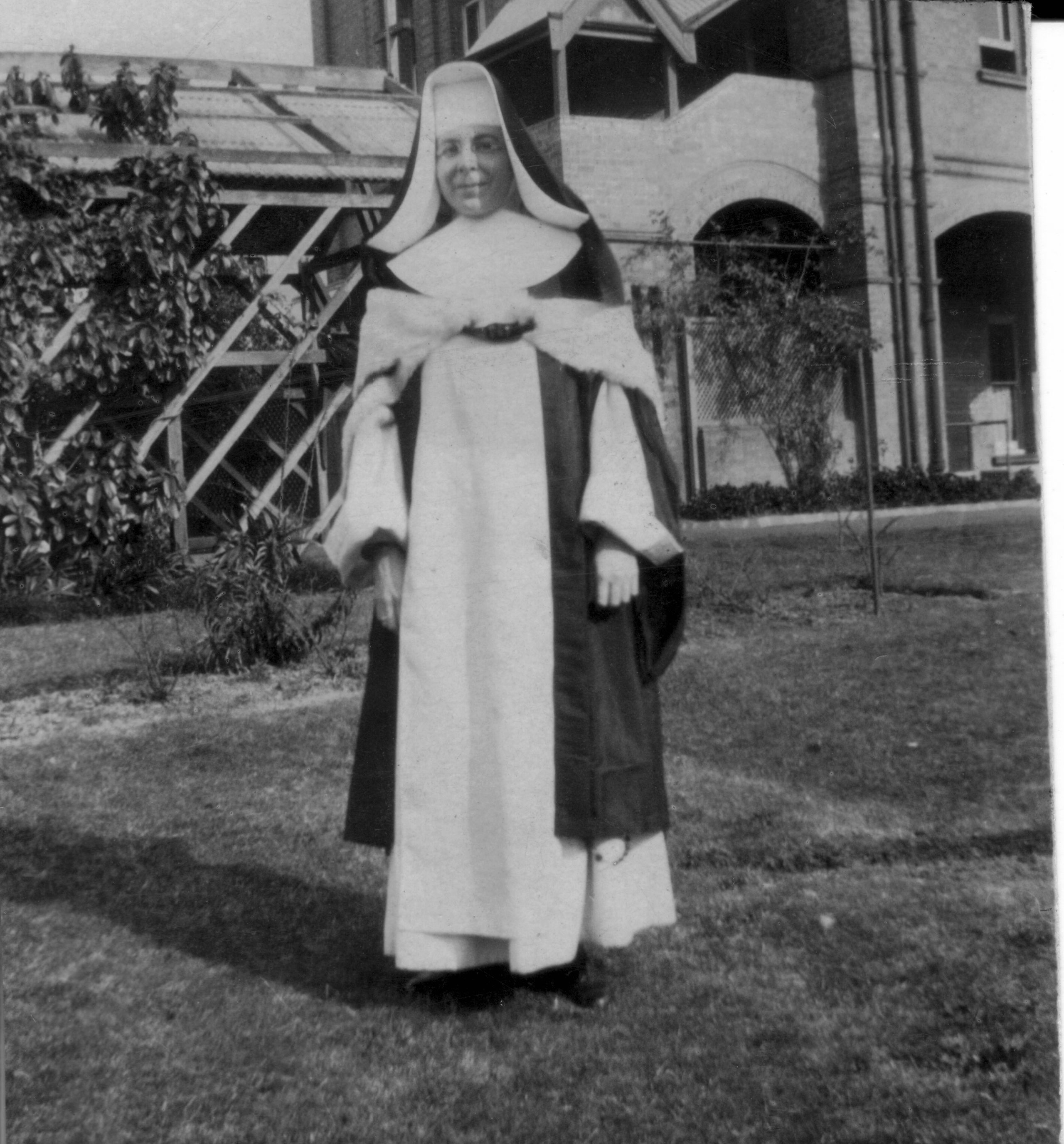
Sister Mary Anselm in full habit

Sister Mary Anselm became known for her innovative methods as well as her many lectures and publications on English literature and Christian doctrine. In 1925 she co-founded with Frank Sheed the school branch of the Catholic Evidence Guild, thus breaking new ground in the teaching of religion. She published a monograph entitled The Catholic Evidence Guild in Secondary Schools in 1939. Always an advocate for tertiary education, she built up the school's library at Santa Sabina, and organised regular weekly feature lectures on English and Latin literature for the senior pupils and the Sisters. Many of the lecturers were from published authors – her friends from university days – and she also frequently invited writers to the school. Sister Mary Anselm O'Brien died in 1945 and the library in the Aquinas Centre at Santa Sabina College is dedicated to her memory.

== Selected works ==
- O'Brien, Mary Anselm (1937). Magic Casements: A Book of Poems for Junior and Middle Forms. Sydney, New South Wales: Angus & Robertson.
- O'Brien, Mary Anselm (1939). The Catholic Evidence Guild in Secondary Schools. Sydney, New South Wales: Dwyer.
- O'Hanlon, Mary Assumpta (1949). Dominican pioneers in New South Wales. Sydney, New South Wales: Australasian Publishing Company.
