= Caryll Houselander =

British lay Roman Catholic ecclesiastical writer

- Born: 29 September 1901; Bath
- Died: 12 October 1954 (aged 53); London
- Occupation: Writer

Caryll Houselander (29 September 1901 – 12 October 1954) was an English lay Roman Catholic ecclesiastical artist, mystic, popular religious writer and poet.

== Early life ==
Houselander was born in Bath; the second of two daughters of Wilmott and Gertrude Provis Houselander who were English Anglicans.

Several authors, including Maisie Ward in her 1962 biography Caryll Houselander: That Divine Eccentric, incorrectly state that Houselander was born on 29 October 1901 when, in fact, she was born on 29 September 1901 according to her birth certificate. In her remark in A Rocking-Horse Catholic (cited below, p. 41), she took the Confirmation name of Michael "after the Archangel on whose feast day I was born."

When Houselander was six, her mother converted to Roman Catholicism and she in turn was also baptised. Shortly after her ninth birthday, her parents separated and her mother opened a boarding house to support the family; Houselander was sent to a boarding school, the Convent of the Holy Child.

In her teens, she returned home to help her mother in the running of the boarding house. Her mother had allowed a priest to stay and this became a source of scandal. Houselander and her mother were ostracised by the community. This may have partly influenced her decision to leave the Catholic Church as a teenager, and may have contributed to a sense of isolation she would feel at times. This latter problem was reflected in panic attacks when entering rooms and meeting strangers, so much so that she was considered neurotic.

In July 1918, Houselander was sent by her mother on an errand. On her way to the street vendor, she looked up and saw what she later described as a huge Russian-style icon spread across the sky. Shortly after, she read in a newspaper an article about the assassination of Russian Tsar Nicholas II. She said the face she saw in the newspaper photograph was the face in her vision of the crucified Christ.

== Later life and works ==
The mystical experiences she claimed to have experienced convinced her that Christ is to be found in all people, even those whom the world shunned because they did not conform to certain standards of piety. She wrote that if people looked for Christ only in the "saints" then they would not find him. She herself smoked, drank, and had a sharp tongue.

Houselander returned to the Catholic Church in 1925, but her spiritual reading was founded almost entirely on the Gospels, rather than the writings of the Church Fathers or official church documents. She met and fell in love with Sidney Reilly, a famous spy, but he left her broken-hearted when he married another woman. She would never marry.

Houselander was a prolific writer and contributed many pieces to religious magazines, such as the Messenger of the Sacred Heart and The Children's Messenger. Her first book, This War is the Passion, was published in 1941 and in it she placed the suffering of the individual and its meaning within the mystical Body of Christ. For a time, she became publisher Sheed & Ward's best selling writer, drawing praise from people such as Ronald Knox:

"she seemed to see everything for the first time, and the driest of doctrinal considerations shone out like a restored picture when she had finished with it. And her writing was always natural; she seemed to find no difficulty in getting the right word; no, not merely the right word, the telling word, that left you gasping."

During the Second World War, doctors began sending patients to Houselander for counselling and therapy. Even though she lacked formal education in this area, she seemed to have a natural empathy for people in mental anguish and a talent for helping them to rebuild their world. A visitor once found her alone on the floor, apparently in great pain, which she attributed to her willingness to take on herself a great trial and temptation that was overwhelming another person. A psychiatrist, Eric Strauss, later president of the British Psychological Society, said of Houslander: "she loved them back to life... .she was a divine eccentric."

Houselander titled her autobiography A Rocking-Horse Catholic to differentiate herself from those termed "Cradle Catholics". She died in London of breast cancer on 12 October 1954, at the age of 53.

== See also ==
- Christian mysticism
- Mysticism
- Catholicism

== Selected works ==
Sheed & Ward books:

- This War is the Passion (1941); republished by Ave Maria Press (2008)
- The Reed of God (1944); republished by Ave Maria Press (2008)
- The Splendor of the Rosary by Maisie Ward, prayers by Caryll Houselander (1945)
  - Houselander's prayers reprinted in The Essential Rosary published by Sophia Institute Press (1996)
- The Flowering Tree (1945); republished by Cluny
- The Dry Wood (1947); republished by Cluny (2021) and by CUA Press (2022)
- The Passion of the Infant Christ (1949); republished as Wood of the Cradle, Wood of the Cross: The Little Way of the Infant Jesus by Sophia Institute Press (1995)
  - The Passion of the Infant Christ, critical edition edited by Kerry Walters (Eugene, OR: Cascade Books, 2017)
- Guilt (1951); republished by Cluny (2022)
- The Comforting of Christ (1954)
- A Rocking-Horse Catholic (1955); republished by Aeterna Press (2015)
- The Stations of the Cross (1955), illustrated with fourteen wood engravings by Houselander
  - The Way of the Cross, retitled and revised edition (inclusive language changes and use of a different Biblical translation for scriptural quotations) published by Liguori Publications (2002)
- Inside the Ark (1956)
- Terrible Farmer Timson and Other Stories (1957); republished as Catholic Tales for Boys and Girls by Sophia Institute Press (2002)
- The Risen Christ (1959); republished by Scepter Publications (2007)
- The Letters of Caryll Houselander: Her Spiritual Legacy (1965), edited by Maisie Ward; republished by Cluny (2022)
- Reproachfully yours; with a foreword by Caryll Houselander by Lucile Halsey
