= Mary Barr (disambiguation) =

Mary Barr (1925–2010) was an American aviator, safety officer, mechanic and flight instructor.

Mary Barr may also refer to:

- Mary Barr Clay (1839–1924), American suffragist and farmer
- Mary Barr Mackinlay (1910–1974), Australian Roman Catholic nun and teacher
- Mary Barr Munroe (1852–1922), Scottish-born American clubwoman and conservationist
