= Castelot =

Castelot is a surname. Notable people with the surname include:

- André Castelot (1911–2004), French writer and scriptwriter
- Jacques Castelot (1914–1989), French actor
- John J. Castelot (1916–1999), American Roman Catholic priest, Sulpician, teacher, and writer
