= William George Ward =

English theologian and mathematician

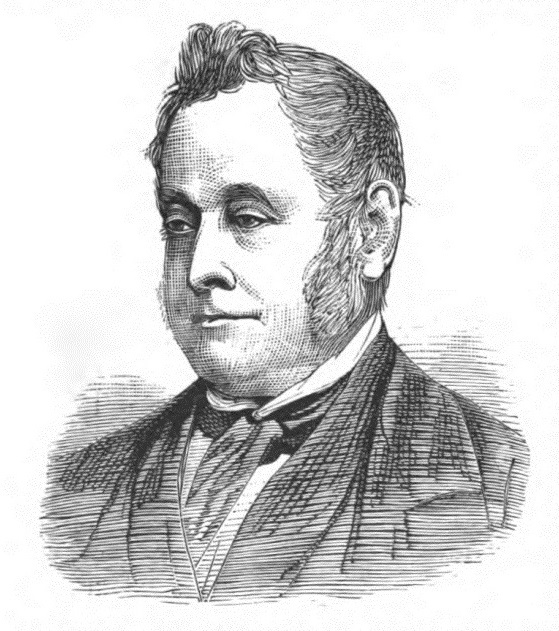
- Engraving of William George Ward (1883)
- Born: 21 March 1812; London
- Died: 6 July 1882 (aged 70); Hampstead, London
- Education: Winchester College
- Alma mater: Balliol College, Oxford
- Father: William Ward
- Relatives: Henry Sampson Woodfall (maternal grandfather)
- Scientific career
- Fields: Mathematics and Theology
- Workplaces: St. Edmund's College

William George Ward (21 March 1812 – 6 July 1882) was an English theologian and mathematician. A Roman Catholic convert, his career illustrates the development of religious opinion at a time of crisis in the history of English religious thought.

== Life ==
He was the son of William Ward and Emily Combe. He was educated at Winchester College and went up to Christ Church, Oxford, in 1830, but his father's financial difficulties forced him in 1833 to try for a scholarship at Lincoln College, which he succeeded in obtaining. Ward had a gift for pure mathematics but for history, applied mathematics or anything outside the exact sciences, he felt contempt. He was endowed with a strong sense of humour and a love of paradox carried to an extreme. His examination for mathematical honours exhibited some of the peculiarities of his character and mental powers. Four out of his five papers on applied mathematics were sent up absolutely blank. Honours, however, were not refused him, and in 1834 he obtained an open fellowship at Balliol.

In the previous year, the Tractarian movement had been launched: Ward was attracted to it by his hatred of moderation and what he called "respectability". He was repelled by the conception he had formed of John Henry Newman, whom he regarded as a mere antiquary. When, however, he was at length persuaded by a friend to go and hear Newman preach, he at once became a disciple. But he had, as Newman afterwards said of him, "struck into the movement at an angle." He had no taste for historical investigations. He treated the question at issue as one of pure logic: disliking the Reformers, the right of private judgment which Protestants claimed, and the somewhat prosaic uniformity of the English Church, he flung himself into a campaign against Protestantism in general and the Anglican form of it in particular. He nevertheless took deacon's orders in 1838 and priest's orders in 1840.

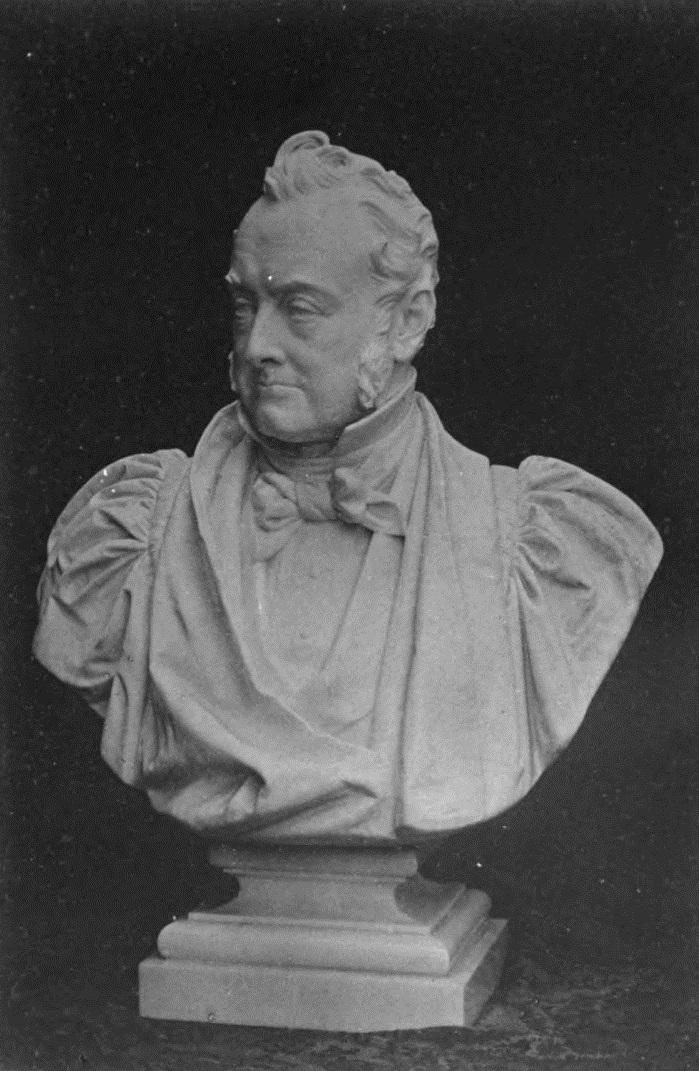
Bust of Ward, by Mario Raggi

In 1839 Ward became a writer for the British Critic, the organ of the Tractarian party, and he excited suspicion among the adherents of the party by his violent denunciations of the Anglican Church, to which he still belonged. In 1841 he urged the publication of the celebrated Tract 90, and wrote in defence of it. From that period Ward and his associates worked undisguisedly for union with the Roman Catholic Church, and in 1844 he published his Ideal of a Christian Church, in which he openly contended that the only hope for the Church of England lay in submission to the Church of Rome. This publication brought to a height the storm which had long been gathering. The University of Oxford was invited, on 13 February 1845, to condemn Tract 90, to censure the Ideal, and to deprive Ward of his degrees. The two latter propositions were carried with Ward being deprived of his tutorship and Tract 90 only escaped censure by the non-placet of the proctors, Guillemard and Church.

Ward left the Church of England in September 1845, and was followed by many others, including Newman himself. After his reception into the Catholic Church, Ward devoted himself to ethics, metaphysics and moral philosophy. After his conversion he married, and for a time had to struggle with poverty. But his circumstances slowly improved. In 1851 he became a professor of moral philosophy at St Edmund's College, Ware, and the following year he was appointed to the chair of dogmatic theology.

== Dublin Review ==
Ward wrote articles on free will, the philosophy of theism, and on science, prayer and miracles for the Dublin Review. In 1863 he became editor of the Dublin Review (1863–1878). He took over as editor in July 1863, deferring editorial decisions on politics, history, or literature to sub-editors. He was an opponent of Liberal Catholicism and defender of papal authority, and attacked the views of Charles Forbes René de Montalembert and Ignaz von Döllinger. He supported the promulgation of the dogma of Papal Infallibility in 1870. He also dealt with the condemnation of Pope Honorius I, carried on a controversial correspondence with John Stuart Mill, and took a leading part in the discussions of the Metaphysical Society.

Ward died in July 1882 after a protracted illness, and was buried in the Isle of Wight. Cardinal Vaughan preached at the funeral. Alfred, Lord Tennyson, visiting the grave, was moved to recite verses by James Shirley to the effect that only moral worth is a treasure not taken away from us by death, and afterwards commemorated Ward with the memorial verses:

Farewell, whose like on earth I shall not find,
Whose Faith and Work were bells of full accord,
My friend, the most unworldly of mankind,
Most generous of all Ultramontanes, Ward,
How subtle at tierce and quart of mind with mind,
How loyal in the following of thy Lord!

== Family ==
Ward was the grandnephew of Robert Plumer Ward, the nephew of Sir Henry George Ward, and the son of William Ward.

He was the father of Newman's biographer, Wilfrid Philip Ward; a grandfather of Father Leo Ward, a missionary in Japan and co-founder of Sheed & Ward, and of Leo's sister, the writer and publisher Maisie Ward; and a great-grandfather of the translator Rosemary Sheed, and of Rosemary's brother, the novelist Wilfrid Sheed. His daughter was professed as a Benedictine nun and became Lady Abbess of Oulton Abbey, Staffordshire.

== Works ==
- The Ideal of a Christian Church (1844)
- The Anglican Establishment Contrasted (1850)
- Heresy and Immortality (1851)
- On Nature and Grace: A Theological Treatise (1860)
- The Relation of Intellectual Power to Man's True Perfection (1862)
- The Authority of Doctrinal Decisions Which are not Definitions of Faith, Considered in a Short Series of Essays Reprinted from "The Dublin Review" (1866)
- De Infallibilitatis Extensione (1869)
- Essays on Devotional and Scriptural Subjects (1879)
- The Condemnation of Pope Honorius (1879)
- Essays on the Church's Doctrinal Authority (1880)
- Essays on the Philosophy of Theism Vol. 1 Vol. 2 (1884)

Selected articles

- "Intrinsic End of Civil Government," The Dublin Review, Vol. LIII (1863).
- "The Dogmatic Principle," The Dublin Review, Vol. LIII (1863).
- "The 'Union' Movement," The Dublin Review, Vol. LIV (1864).
- "Rome and the Munich Congress," The Dublin Review, Vol. LV (1864).
- "The University Question," The Dublin Review, Vol. LVI (1865).
- "The Encyclical and Syllabus," The Dublin Review, Vol. LVI (1865).
- "Public School Education," The Dublin Review, Vol. LVII (1865).
- "Rome, Unionism, and Indifferentism," The Dublin Review, Vol. LVII (1865).
- "Mr. Oxenham and the 'Dublin Review'," The Dublin Review, Vol. LVII (1865).
- "Doctrinal Decrees of a Pontifical Congregation: The Case of Galileo," The Dublin Review, Vol. LVII (1865).
- "Dr. Pusey's Apology for Anglicanism," The Dublin Review, Vol. LVIII (1866).
- "Dr. Pusey's Project of Union," The Dublin Review, Vol. LVIII (1866).
- "The Council of Florence," The Dublin Review, Vol. LVIII (1866).
- "Irish Writers on University Education," The Dublin Review, Vol. LIX (1866).
- "Dr. Pusey on Marian Devotion," The Dublin Review, Vol. LIX (1866).
- "Pius IX. and the 'Civiltà Cattolica'," The Dublin Review, Vol. LIX (1866).
- "Two Criticisms on the Dublin Review," The Dublin Review, Vol. LX (1867).
- "Science, Prayer, Free Will and Miracles," The Dublin Review, Vol. LX (1867).
- "Doctrinal Apostolic Letters," The Dublin Review, Vol. LXII (1868).
- "The Witness of Heretical Bodies to Mariology," The Dublin Review, Vol. LXII (1868).
- "The Irish Disestablishment," The Dublin Review, Vol. LXIII (1868).
- "Principles of Catholic Higher Education," The Dublin Review, Vol. LXIV (1869).
- "Catholic Controversy," The Dublin Review, Vol. LXV (1869).
- "Grignon de Monfort and his Devotion," The Dublin Review, Vol. LXVIII (1871).
- "The Definition of Papal Infallibility," The Dublin Review, Vol. LXVIII (1871).
- "Certitude in Religious Assent," The Dublin Review, Vol. LXVIII (1871).
- "Copernicanism and Pope Paul V," The Dublin Review, Vol. LXVIII (1871).
- "The Rule and Motive of Certitude," The Dublin Review, Vol. LXIX (1871).
- "Galileo and the Pontifical Congregations," The Dublin Review, Vol. LXIX (1871).
- "Mr. Mill's Denial of Necessary Truth," The Dublin Review, Vol. LXIX (1871).
- "Liberalism Religious and Ecclesiastical," The Dublin Review, Vol. LXX (1872).
- "Mr. Mill on the Foundation of Morality," The Dublin Review, Vol. LXX (1872).
- "Father Liberatore, Father Harper, and Lord Robert Montagu," The Dublin Review, Vol. LXX (1872).
- "Parliament and Catholic Education," The Dublin Review, Vol. LXX (1872).
- "The Priesthood in Irish Politics," The Dublin Review, Vol. LXXI (1872).
- "A Word on Classical Studies," The Dublin Review, Vol. LXXI (1872).
- "The Present Anglican Position," The Dublin Review, Vol. LXXI (1872).
- "The Labourers and Political Economy," The Dublin Review, Vol. LXXII (1873).
- "Irish Priests and Landlords," The Dublin Review, Vol. LXXII (1873).
- "A Few Words on Dr. Brownson's Philosophy," The Dublin Review, Vol. LXXVIII (1876).
- "Father O'Reilly on Society and the Church," The Dublin Review, Vol. LXXVIII (1876).
- "Tradition and Papal Infallibility," The Dublin Review, Vol. LXXVIII (1876).
- "Church and State," The Dublin Review, Vol. LXXVIII (1876).
- "Professor Mivart on the Rights of Conscience," The Dublin Review, Vol. LXXIX (1876).
- "Cremation," The Dublin Review, Vol. LXXIX (1876).
- "Mr. Mill on Causation," The Dublin Review, Vol. LXXIX (1876).
- "Civil Intolerance of Religious Error: Professor Mivart on Liberty of Conscience," The Dublin Review, Vol. LXXX (1877).
- "Hergenröther on Church and State," The Dublin Review, Vol. LXXXI (1877).
- "Mr. Shadworth Hodgson on Free Will," The Dublin Review, Vol. LXXXVII (1880).
- "Philosophy of the Theistic Controversy," The Dublin Review, Vol. LXXXIX (1882).

== See also ==
- Anglo-Catholicism
