= Crossroads (1955 TV series) =

American TV anthology series (1955–1957)

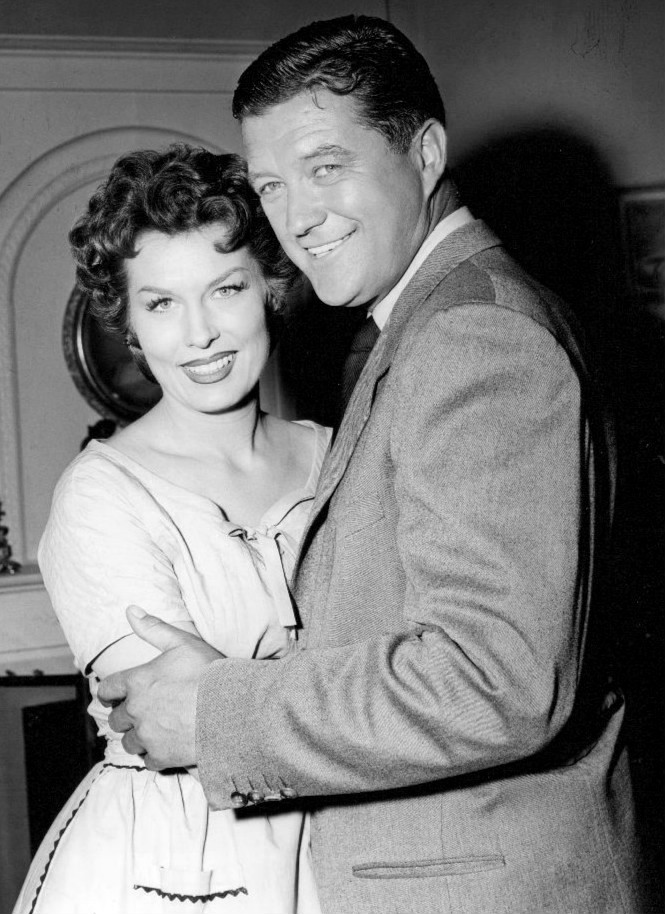
- Jean Willes and Dennis Morgan in Crossroads (1955)
- Genre: Anthology
- Directed by: Justus Addiss; Nathan Juran; Richard Kinon; Paul Landres; Leslie H. Martinson; Ralph Murphy; Ralph Nelson; George Waggner
- Country of origin: United States
- Original language: English
- No. of seasons: 2
- No. of episodes: 78

Production
- Executive producer: Harry Joe Brown
- Producers: Harry Joe Brown; Bernard Schubert
- Editors: Roy V. Livingston; James E. Smith
- Camera setup: Single-camera
- Running time: 25 mins.
- Production companies: Federal Telefilms; Sterling Films (IV)

Original release
- Network: ABC; Syndication
- Release: October 7, 1955 – June 6, 1957

Crossroads is an American television anthology series based on the activities of clergy from different denominations. It aired from October 7, 1955, to September 27, 1957, on ABC. The show was retitled The Way of Life for syndication.

Story technical advisers were credited as Fr. George Barry Ford, USN Captain Maurice M. Witherspoon Presbyterian Minister, Vice-President of the Military Chaplains Association and Rabbi William Franklin Rosenblum. The entire series is preserved at the UCLA Film and Television Archive in Los Angeles, California.

== Overview ==
All of the series' episodes dramatized clergymen's experiences, including personal and professional problems that they encountered. Many faiths were represented over the course of the series. The episodes, which often had deep spiritual themes, were usually set in the 1950s, but some were framed for an earlier era.

Chevrolet sponsored Crossroads. Bernard L. Schubert was the producer-packager, and Harry Joe Brown was the series' originator. Episodes were filmed at Samuel Goldwyn Studios.

== Guest stars ==
The series featured numerous guest stars, many of whom appeared in several episodes throughout the series' run. James Dean appeared in a 1955 episode, "Broadway Trust", along with Lloyd Bridges and Mary Treen. The episode aired five weeks after Dean died in an automobile crash in September 1955.

Victor Jory was cast in the 1957 episode "Lone Star Preacher", a dramatization of the Texas Baptist pastor George Washington Truett, with Barbara Eiler as his wife, Jo Truett.

Other guest stars include:

- Luther Adler
- Suzanne Alexander
- Hugh Beaumont
- Noah Beery, Jr.
- Ray Boyle
- Edgar Buchanan
- Robert Cabal
- Charles Cane
- Albert Cavens
- Spencer Chan
- John Cliff
- G. Pat Collins
- Chuck Connors
- Jeanne Cooper
- Johnny Crawford
- Donald Crisp
- Richard H. Cutting
- Richard Deacon
- Don DeFore
- Larry Dobkin
- Elinor Donahue
- Brian Donlevy
- Howard Duff
- Barbara Eden
- Stuart Erwin
- Yvonne Lime Fedderson
- Arthur Franz
- Terry Frost
- Robert Fuller (actor)
- John Goddard
- Virginia Gregg
- Barbara Hale
- Taylor Holmes
- Clark Howat
- Vivi Janiss
- Russell Johnson
- Jonathan Hale
- Jess Kirkpatrick
- Peg LaCentra
- Michael Landon
- Nolan Leary
- Gene Lockhart
- Jimmy Lydon
- Barton MacLane
- Maggie Mahoney
- Hugh Marlowe
- Strother Martin
- Kevin McCarthy
- Charles McGraw
- Eve Miller
- Martin Milner
- Gerald Mohr
- Donald Murphy
- J. Carrol Naish
- Jeanette Nolan
- Pat O'Brien
- Susan Oliver
- Maureen O'Sullivan
- Gregg Palmer
- Jerry Paris
- Leo Penn
- Vincent Price
- Roy Roberts
- Frank J. Scannell
- Fred Sherman
- Lyle Talbot
- Regis Toomey
- Lee Van Cleef
- Bobs Watson
- Will J. White
- James Whitmore
- Grant Withers

== Broadcast history ==
Crossroads was broadcast on ABC on Fridays from 8:30 to 9 p.m. Eastern Time from October 1955 through September 1957. In its first season on ABC, Crossroads followed the long-running sitcom The Adventures of Ozzie and Harriet on the Friday evening schedule. It was scheduled opposite Our Miss Brooks on CBS and The Life of Riley on NBC. The trade publication Billboard reported in July 1956 that the Nielsen report for June 1956 showed Crossroads between those competitors in both rating and share of audience.

Sample episodes:

- "A Bell for O'Donnell" – A reverend (Edmund Lowe) learns a lesson in forgiveness when he is swindled by a fast-talking con man.
- "Call for Help" – A priest (Richard Carlson) works with troubled youths when a gang fight leads to a fatal shooting.
- "Cleanup" – A pastor (Vincent Price) exhorts his parishioners to take back their city from the gangsters and corrupt politicians who have taken it over.
- "Dig or Die, Brother Hyde" – A new preacher (Hugh Marlowe) on the harsh Dakota frontier is severely tested.
- "God of Kandikur" (January 25, 1957)
- "God's Healing" – Vincent Price plays a Pennsylvania Priest named Alfred Price, who heals an old woman's embittered heart.
- "The Good Thief" – A US Army chaplain (James Whitmore) is tortured by Red Chinese captors for ministering to his fellow prisoners of war.
- "A Holiday for Father Jim" – A priest (Pat O'Brien) risks his life attempting to save a young bank robber, his hostage, and police from further violence.
- "The Judge" (May 18, 1956) – Brian Donlevy does double duty in a lawless town as a preacher and a judge.
- "Mother O'Brien" – A police detective is torn between family and duty when his younger brother is involved in a petty crime.
- "Mr. Liberty Bell" (November 18, 1955)
- "Our First Christmas Tree" (December 21, 1956) – Puritanical parents oppose an immigrant minister's plan to put a Christmas tree in their church.
