= John A. Trese =

Australian Catholic priest (1923–2004)

Fr. John A. Trese
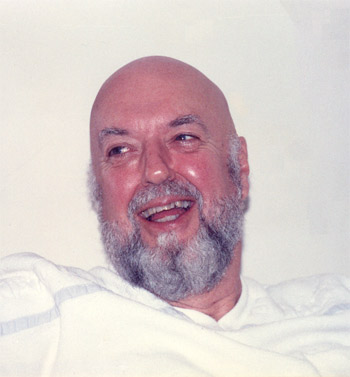

Orders
- Ordination: May 22, 1948

Personal details
- Born: John Arthur Trese; June 20, 1923 St. Clair, Michigan, United States
- Died: October 20, 2004
- Denomination: Roman Catholic
- Occupation: priest

Monsignor John Arthur Trese ("Fr. Jack") (June 20, 1923 – October 20, 2004) was an American Catholic priest serving the Archdiocese of Detroit from 1951 to 2000.

== Biography ==
=== Early life ===
Born in St. Clair, Michigan, in 1923, Trese was the eldest of the six children of Arthur Thomas Trese. He graduated from St. Joseph Elementary and St. Stephen's High School in Port Huron. Recognizing his vocation to the priesthood early in life, he followed the path of his uncle, Father Leo J. Trese, a diocesan priest and noted author.

=== Education and Ordination ===
Trese attended Sacred Heart Major Seminary for his college work and completed his studies for the priesthood at the Theological College of The Catholic University of America in Washington, D.C. He was ordained May 22, 1948.

Following his first assignment to St. Louis Parish in Mt. Clemens, Michigan, in 1951, Trese was tapped to attend graduate school at Saint Louis University where he earned bachelor's and master's degrees in social work.

=== Career ===
In 1953 he was appointed associate secretary for Catholic Charities, eventually becoming Director of Catholic Social Services of Oakland, Monroe, Washtenaw, and Lapeer counties in Michigan. He held the post until 1965.

In 1962 he was appointed Spiritual Director of the National Council of Catholic Nurses. He authored an article in The Catholic Nurse monthly journal titled "Life with Father."

From 1965 to 1968, Trese directed the Archdiocesan Opportunity Program. While there, Trese began more than 13 programs including many Headstart sites and teaching programs for women in prison. During the 1960s he became one of the leaders of the emerging consciousness for greater social justice in the Detroit area.

In 1968 he was appointed rector of St. Columban Church, a position he held until 2000 when he retired as senior priest. While there, he served as Vicar Pro-tem of the South Oakland Vicariate and instituted many programs at St. Columban's, including his ministry to fellow priests, to Catholics affected by divorce, and to families touched by suicide.

In 2001, St. Columban was named one of the Excellent Catholic Parishes by Paul Wilkes, citing programs developed by Trese: spontaneous prayers of the faithful during Mass, collaborative spirit between leadership and laypeople, emphasis on learning and personal development, and suicide support group.

=== Death ===
Trese died October 20, 2004, following complications resulting from cancer. He was 81. His life was celebrated in two funeral masses; the first was celebrated by Cardinal Adam Maida and the second was a more personal one for the St. Columban church community. He received a final blessing from the community, and received many eulogies, one being The Good News of Jack Trese.

=== Digital Archive ===
Shortly after his death, a small group of St. Columban parishioners decided to develop a website dedicated to the spirit and teachings of Trese. The site, frjack.org, serves a variety of purposes. For a number of years, his sermons were taped, and are now available for listening on the site. In addition, many of his writings, dating back to 1962, have been scanned for reading purposes.

== Views and Practices ==
Trese believed in the need to seek unity among all people. In his pastoral role, he sought to correlate the teachings of Jesus and the initiatives of the Vatican II Council to respond to the needs of individuals within a Catholic community facing the questions and challenges of the modern world.

Trese believed in the power of the community. He trusted the integrity of those in the pews. "Never let anyone or any organization think for you" was a phrase he was known to use. He very seldom discouraged a community member who came to him with an idea for a new group or event. He felt if there was a need in the community for it, it would grow; if there was no need, it would not survive. He believed in inclusion, and invited those in the congregation who were not Catholic, but to whom the mass was a significant event, to receive communion. The greatest sin, he said, was indifference. He began support groups for divorced Catholics in the 1960s, when this was an uncommon practice. He also started support groups for those touched by suicide and those with a non-traditional sexual orientation. Regarding suicide, Trese would say that, "...people die from suicide, not by suicide." Just as people die from cancer, not by cancer. Members of the parish participated in faith-sharing groups, sharing the stories of their faith journeys. Trese deeply believed that "every individual's faith story matters."

Trese was always learning and growing, either through his voracious reading or through his many discussions with friends and members of his congregation. "To be religiously alive," he said, "is to be uncertain." He believed in the power of the Gospels and Jesus' teaching to serve as a guide through life. Trese once said, "Jesus saw things differently. He preached inclusion rather than separateness. Everything we really need to know can be found in Christ's teachings of love and compassion. I don't feel I need to defend or 'sell' the Gospels, they take care of themselves. I have grown as much from the experience of being a parish pastor as the people I've served."

He began every mass by encouraging the congregation to "take a deep breath" in order to be present for each other. Every mass ended with the phrase "The mass continues. Let's have a great week!" He understood that the gifts received at mass each week would be shared throughout the coming week, and that the sacredness of the event would not end with the recessional song. He also developed the Prayers of the Faithful into an opportunity for sharing. Members of the congregation stood up and asked for prayers themselves, rather than sending in prayer requests, or using standard prayer requests. In this way, the congregation began to understand each other more deeply, and the mass became more of a dialogue.

At one point the congregation was challenged to come up with 'one word' to describe the experience at St. Columban. 'Freedom' was unanimously voted on. In that context, they felt free to offer ideas for their Catholic spiritual development. One of the unique avenues that came out of this environment was an alternative to, or an addition to, CCD for families called 'Family Experience'. In the 1980s and 1990s several families met once a month and taught and experienced their faith through some family activity. And since the environment of St. Columban was inclusive, the term 'family' came to mean everyone, and those who were single were welcomed.

== Reputation ==
"He was considered a hero to many priests," said Fr. Paul F. Chateau, pastor of Our Lady of Fatima Parish in Oak Park. "A creative, engaging and humble person, he was not locked into the past. His openness and personal growth encouraged openness in others," he added. "Like the ad for E.F. Hutton, when Fr. Jack spoke, others listened."

Rev. Robert Giuliano, retired pastor of Glenwood United Church of Windsor, part of the United Church of Canada, said, "I considered Jack my best friend across the border. Few people knew he was well-known and cherished in Canada. We had a common bond in the Lord and in the ministry that is rare."

== External resources ==
1. Msgr. John "Jack" Trese - obituary from Archdiocese of Detroit October 20, 2004.
2. John Trese obituary - Detroit Free Press October 25, 2004
3. "Father Jack" by Madge Lawson.
4. Fr. Jack website: www.frjack.org Listen to his sermons, read about the changing Catholic Church in articles dating back to 1962.
