= Maisie Ward =

British Catholic biographer (1889–1975)

- Born: Mary Josephin Ward; 4 January 1889; Snowdon House, Shanklin, Isle of Wight, England
- Died: 28 January 1975 (aged 86); Jersey City, New Jersey, U.S.
- Other name: Maisie Sheed
- Occupation: Publisher
- Spouse: Frank Sheed (m. 1926)
- Children: 2, including Wilfrid Sheed
- Parents: Wilfrid Ward (father); Josephine Ward (mother)
- Relatives: Walter Maxwell-Scott (cousin); Arthur Hope, 2nd Baron Rankeillour (cousin); Henry Hope, 3rd Baron Rankeillour (cousin); Bernard Ward (uncle); Minna O'Conor (aunt); Nicholas O'Conor (uncle); James Hope, 1st Baron Rankeillour (uncle); William George Ward (grandfather); James Hope-Scott (grandfather)
- Writing career
- Language: English
- Genres: Biography, Apologetics
- Notable work: Gilbert Keith Chesterton

Mary Josephine "Maisie" Ward (married name Sheed; 4 January 1889 – 28 January 1975) was a British writer, speaker, and publisher, well known for her biography of G. K. Chesterton.

== Early life ==
Ward was born Mary Josephine Ward on 4 January 1889 at Snowdon House in Shanklin, Isle of Wight to Wilfrid Ward, a Catholic biographer and ecclesiastical historian, and Josephine Ward, a novelist and Roman Catholic laywoman. The eldest of the five children, on her mother's side she was descended from Henry Fitzalan-Howard, 14th Duke of Norfolk, and on her father's side from William George Ward, a prominent member of the Oxford Movement. All four of her grandparents were converts to Catholicism.

She spent her childhood at first on the Isle of Wight, then Eastbourne, and finally in Dorking, before being sent off to board at St Mary's School, Cambridge. Here she was influenced by the preaching of Robert Hugh Benson and inspired by Mary Ward who had founded the order of nuns who ran the school. She remembered preparing for confirmation in 1905, when she was 16, with Mother Mary Loyola's book The Soldier of Christ, or, Talks Before Confirmation (1900), and she then boarded for a time at the Bar Convent to study with her personally.

== Career ==
On leaving school, Maisie returned home to work for her father when he served as editor of the Dublin Review. She worked for the Red Cross as a nursing aide during the First World War, alongside the Daughters of Charity and Sisters of Charity nurses. After her father's death in 1916 she co-edited with her mother a posthumous collection of his last lectures.

In 1919, Ward became a charter member of the Catholic Evidence Guild. Ward was a forceful public lecturer. It was through the Guild that she met Frank Sheed. The couple have sometimes been cited as a modern Catholic example of street preaching. They were married in 1926; that same year, they moved to London, founding the Sheed and Ward publishing house. Ward's brother Leo was invited to be co-founder, but he proved ill-suited to the work. Ward took his place when Leo left to become a priest.

Ward gained fame for her authorized biography of friend G. K. Chesterton, written at the request of Chesterton's widow. Ward also wrote biographies of John Henry Newman, her own father, and Robert Browning; and on other areas, including New Testament scholarship, spirituality, and stories of saints and lesser notables, among them her good friend, the writer and mystic Caryll Houselander.

Maisie Ward died 28 January 1975 in Jersey City, New Jersey. Sheed wrote a posthumous tribute to his wife under the title The Instructed Heart.

== Family ==
Ward was the great-great-grandniece of Robert Plumer Ward, father of Sir Henry George Ward and grandfather of Dudley Ward; the great-granddaughter of William Ward, and of Henry Fitzalan-Howard, 14th Duke of Norfolk and Augusta Mary Minna Catherine Lyons; the granddaughter of William George Ward, and of James Hope-Scott and Lady Victoria Alexandrina Fitzalan-Howard; the niece of James Hope, 1st Baron Rankeillour; and the daughter of Wilfrid Philip Ward and the novelist Josephine Mary Hope-Scott Ward.

Maisie and Frank's son, Wilfrid Sheed was also a writer.

== Works ==
- Catholic Evidence Training Outlines, ed., Benziger Bros., 1925.
- The Wilfrid Wards and the Transition, Sheed & Ward, 1934.
- Insurrection vs. Resurrection, Sheed & Ward, 1937.
- The Oxford Group, Sheed & Ward, 1937.
- Gilbert Keith Chesterton, Sheed & Ward, 1943.
- The Splendor of the Rosary, Sheed & Ward, 1945.
- Young Mr. Newman, Sheed & Ward, 1948.
- Return to Chesterton, Sheed & Ward, 1952.
- They Saw His Glory, Sheed & Ward, 1956.
- Early Church Portrait Gallery, Sheed & Ward, 1959.
- Saints Who Made History: The First Five Centuries, Sheed & Ward, 1960.
- Carryll Houselander: That Divine Eccentric, Sheed & Ward, 1962.
- Unfinished Business [autobiography], Sheed & Ward, 1963.
- The Letters Of Caryll Houselander: Her Spiritual Legacy, ed., Sheed & Ward, 1965.
- Robert Browning and His World: The Private Face, Holt, 1967.
- The Tragi-Comedy of Pen Browning, Sheed & Ward, 1972.
- To and Fro on the Earth: A Sequel to an Autobiography, Sheed & Ward, 1973.

== See also ==
- Catholic Evidence Guild
