= Minna O'Conor =

British writer and diarist (1862–1934)

Lady Minna O'Conor
- Born: Minna Margaret Hope-Scott; 1862
- Died: 29 January 1934 (aged 71–72)
- Occupations: Writer; diarist; novelist; poet
- Spouse: Nicholas O'Conor (m. 1887; died 1908)
- Father: James Hope-Scott
- Relatives: James Hope, 1st Baron Rankeillour (brother); Josephine Ward (sister); Mary Monica Maxwell-Scott (half-sister); Maisie Ward (niece); Wilfrid Sheed (great-nephew); Augusta Fitzalan-Howard, Duchess of Norfolk (grandmother); Henry Fitzalan-Howard, 14th Duke of Norfolk (grandfather); Alexander Hope (grandfather)
- Writing career
- Genre: Travel literature

Lady Minna Margaret O'Conor (née Hope-Scott; 1862 – 29 January 1934) was a British writer, diarist, travel writer, novelist and poet. Marrying the diplomat Nicholas O'Conor in 1887, she accompanied him on his diplomatic postings until his death in 1908. The daughter of the barrister and Tractarian James Hope-Scott and Lady Victoria Alexandrina Fitzalan-Howard (1840–1870), O'Conor was the sister of the writer Josephine Ward, the politician James Hope, 1st Baron Rankeillour and the half-sister of the writer Mary Monica Maxwell-Scott.

O'Conor's and her husband's papers are held at the Churchill Archives Centre.
