= Leo J. Trese =

US Catholic priest and author

Rev. Leo J. Trese
- Priest
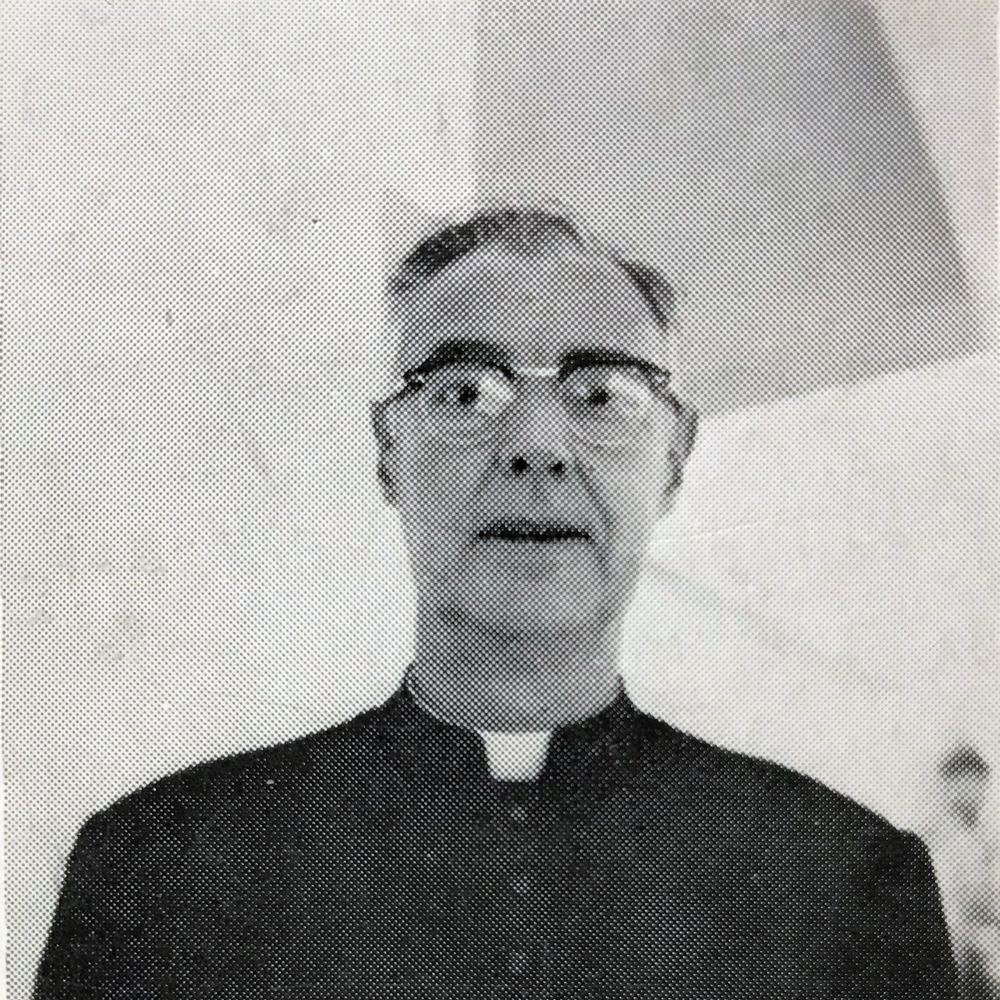
- Native name: Leo John Trese
- Diocese: Roman Catholic Archdiocese of Detroit

Orders
- Ordination: February 13, 1927

Personal details
- Born: May 6, 1902 Port Huron, Michigan, United States
- Died: June 23, 1970 (aged 68)
- Denomination: Catholic Church
- Profession: Catholic priest

Leo John Trese (May 6, 1902 – June 23, 1970) was an American Catholic priest, and author of spiritual books.

== Education and ordination ==
Leo J. Trese was born in Port Huron, Michigan, on May 6, 1902. He was the last of the five children of Joseph Trese and Mary Alice Byrth.

He studied philosophy at the Assumption College of Windsor, Ontario. Later he studied theology at the Mount St. Mary Seminary, in Cincinnati, Ohio. He was ordained a priest on February 13, 1927, by Mgr. Joseph C. Plagens, at the time auxiliary bishop of Detroit.

== Career ==
Attracted by the monastic life after having worked five years in the Roman Catholic Archdiocese of Detroit, he spent some years in the Benedictine order. In 1936 he returned to the Archdiocese of Detroit and worked in Michigan in the cities of Marysville in which he was the first pastor of St. Christopher's Parish, Melvindale, and Carleton. In 1950, as a result of his first signs of heart disease, he was appointed chaplain of the Vista Maria school in Detroit. From then on he devoted himself mostly to research and writing. In 1957 he obtained a PhD in Education at Wayne State University in Detroit. He was followed in his path as a priest by one of his nephews, John A. Trese. Leo J. Trese died on June 23, 1970.

== Works ==
Trese wrote more than twenty books. Those aimed at priests were well received: Vessel of Clay (1950), A Man Approved (1953) and Tenders of the Flock (1955). Some of his other works written for the general public are Many Are One (1952), Wisdom Shall Enter (1954), More Than Many Sparrows (1958), The Faith Explained (1959), Sanctified in Truth (1961), Everyman's Road to Heaven (1961), Parent and Child (1962) and You Are Called to Greatness (1964). His works have been translated into Spanish, German, French, Italian, Korean, Dutch, Polish, Japanese and Portuguese. For several years he wrote a weekly column, "It Seems to Me", printed in The Michigan Catholic. He also published numerous articles in different magazines.

=== Books by year ===
- Trese, Leo J. (1950). Vessel of Clay. New York: Sheed & Ward. Translations: Spanish: Vasija de barro. Palabra. December 1976. ISBN 978-84-8239-529-6. (Currently 6 editions) Italian: Vaso di argilla. Morcelliana. 1955. French: La journée d'un curé. Salvator. 1953. Republished as: Comme un vase d'argile. Le Laurier. 1997. German: Auch ein Mensch. Aus dem Tagebuch eines Priesters. Verlag. 1952. Portuguese: Vaso de argila. Quadrante. Dutch: Broze vaten. Sheed & Ward. 1956.
- Trese, Leo J. (1952). Many Are One. Chicago: Fides. Translations: Spanish: Muchos son uno. Síntesis de espiritualidad seglar. El pez. 1957. French: Nous sommes un. Salvator. 1957. German: Der Christ in der Kirche. Dass alle eins seien. Pattloch. 1954.
- Trese, Leo J. (1953). A Man Approved. New York: Sheed & Ward. Translations: Spanish: El sacerdote al día. El pez. 1959. Italian Il sacerdote, oggi. Pensieri di un parroco americano. Morcelliana. 1955. German: Bewährt vor Gott. Paulus Verlag. 1954. French: Le prêtre d'aujourd'hui, vu par un curé américain. Salvator – Castermann. 1955. Dutch: Een probaat man. Brand. 1955. Korean: 인정받은 사람. 가톨릭출판사. 2007.
- Trese, Leo J. (1954). Wisdom Shall Enter. Chicago: Fides. Translations: Spanish: La sabiduría del cristiano. Palabra. December 12, 2012. ISBN 978-84-9840-805-8. (Currently 8 editions). German: Die Wahrheit gehort uns - Warum sind wir katholisch?. Pattloch. 1958. Portuguese: A Sabedoria do Cristão. Quadrante. 1992.
- Trese, Leo J. (1955). Tenders of the Flock. New York: Sheed & Ward. Translations: Spanish: El Pastor de su rebaño. El pez. 1957. Dutch: Het talent in de kuil. Brand. 1957. Italian: Il sacerdote pastore del gregge. Morcelliana. 1960. German: Hüter der Herde. Paulus. 1956.
- Trese, Leo J. (1955). The Holy Spirit and His work. Paterson: Confraternity. Translated into Spanish as El Espíritu Santo y su tarea. Rialp. June 26, 1998. ISBN 978-84-321-3192-9. (Currently 4 editions)
- Trese, Leo J. (1956). God, Man, and God-man. Paterson: Confraternity. Translated into Spanish as Dios, el hombre y el Hombre-Dios. Studium. 1961.
- Trese, Leo J. (1956). Love in Action. Paterson: Confraternity.
- Trese, Leo J. (1957). Our Christian Vocation. Paterson: Confraternity. Translated into Spanish as Nuestra vocación cristiana. Studium. 1961.
- Trese, Leo J. (1957). God Gives His Help. Paterson: Confraternity. Translated into Spanish as Dios nos tiende su mano. Studium. 1961.
- Trese, Leo J. (1958). More Than Many Sparrows. Chicago: Fides. Translations: Spanish: Más que a las aves del cielo. Palabra. 2002. ISBN 847118138X. Portuguese: Não vos preocupeis. Quadrante. ISBN 9788574653228. Italian: Più di molti passeri. Guida pratica alla vita cristiana. Borla. 1966.
- Trese, Leo J. (1959). The Faith Explained. Chicago: Fides.; 2nd edition. Notre Dame: Fides. 1965.; 3rd edition. Manila: Sinag-tala. 1965. Translations: Spanish: La fe explicada. Rialp. ISBN 978-84-321-1805-0. (Currently 30 editions) Portuguese: A fé explicada. Quadrante. 2014. ISBN 978-8574650128. (Currently 10 editions) French: La foi expliquée. Le Laurier. 1996. ISBN 2864951681. Polish: W co wierzymy: podstawy wiary i życia chrześcijańskiego. Wydawnictwo. 2007. ISBN 9788389368867. Japanese: ジェー・テレセ・レオ (2000). キリストの教え : 百合から薔薇は咲かない。. ISBN 4877311173.
- Trese, Leo J. (1961). Sanctified in Truth. New York: Sheed & Ward. Translations: Portuguese: Santificados na verdade - Diálogos sobre o Sacerdócio. Cultor de livros. ISBN 978855638146-0. (Currently 8 editions) French: Dialogue sur le sacerdoce. Éditions Salvator. 1964. Dutch: Geheiligd in waarheid. De Vroente. 1964. Italian: Santificati nella verità. Morcelliana. 1963.
- Trese, Leo J. (1961). Everyman's Road to Heaven. Chicago: Fides. Recently republished as Seventeen Steps to Heaven: A Catholic Guide to Salvation. Manchester, New Hampshire: Sophia Institute Press. 2001. ISBN 1928832261. Translations: Spanish: Dios necesita de ti. Palabra. June 23, 2022. ISBN 978-84-9840-897-3. (Currently 16 editions) Portuguese: A caminho do céu. Quadrante. 2017. ISBN 9788574652764. Italian: In cammino verso il cielo. Borla. 1967. Polish: Jak dostac sie do nieba?: Katolicki przewodnik po drodze do zbawienia. Wydawnictwo AA. 2013. ISBN 978-83-7864-172-8. Dutch: De hemel is in goeden doen. Gooi & Sticht. 1959.
- Trese, Leo J. (1961). Book for Boys. Chicago: Fides.
- Trese, Leo J. (1961). God's Crowning Gift – The Holy Eucharist and the Mass. Dublin – London: Clonmore and Reynolds Ltd – Burns Oates and Washbourne.
- Trese, Leo J. (1962). Parent and Child. New York: Sheed & Ward. Translations: Spanish: Padres e hijos. Propaganda Popular Católica. 1966. Italian: Genitori e figli. Borla. 1964. French: Parents et enfants. Éditions Salvator. 1964. Portuguese: Pais e filhos. Paulistas. 1967.
- Trese, Leo J. (1962). 101 Delinquent Girls. Chicago: Fides.
- Trese, Leo J. (1962). Living a Christian Life. London: Geoffrey Chapman.
- Trese, Leo J.; Castelot, John J. (1963). Salvation History and the Commandments. Notre Dame: Fides.
- Trese, Leo J. (1964). You Are Called to Greatness. Notre Dame: Fides. Translations Spanish: Puedes volar como las águilas. Palabra. March 1977. ISBN 978-84-8239-802-0. (Currently 8 editions) Portuguese: Dizer sim a Deus. Não à mediocridade. Cultor de livros. 2014. ISBN 978-85-62219-69-6. Polish: Możesz wzbić się jak orzeł. Praktyka życia chrześcijańskiego. Wydawnictwo AA. 2017. ISBN 978-83-7864-737-9.
- Trese, Leo J. (1965). Human but Holy. Chicago: Fides.
- Trese, Leo J. (1967). One Step Enough. Chicago: Fides. Translated into Spanish as Un paso me basta. Sal Terrae. 1968.
- Trese, Leo J. (1967). Book for Boys and Girls. Chicago: Fides.

=== Anthologies, arrangements and partial reprints ===
- Trese, Leo J. (1984). A Trilogy. More Than Many Sparrows, Wisdom Shall Enter, Many Are One. Manila: Sinag-Tala. ISBN 971117023X. The book is an anthology of three works from Leo J. Trese.
- Trese, Leo J. (1963). Guide to Christian Living. Chicago: Fides. The book is an arrangement of Many are One, More than Many Sparrows and Everyman's Road to Heaven.
- Trese, Leo J. (1963). The Creed—Summary of the Faith. Chicago: Fides. The book is an edition of the first part of The Faith Explained.
- Trese, Leo J. (1963). The Sacraments and Prayer. Chicago: Fides. The book is an edition of the third part of The Faith Explained.

=== Forewords ===
- Foreword to Laplace, Jean (1967). The direction of conscience. London: Geofrey Chapman.
- Foreword to Castelot, John J. (1962). God so loved the World (A commentary on the Bible). Notre Dame: Fides.
