= Vincent McNabb =

Irish Catholic priest and scholar (1868–1943)

The Reverend Father Vincent McNabb OP
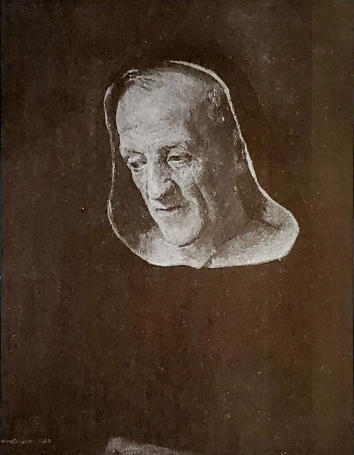
- Born: Joseph McNabb; 8 July 1868; Portaferry, County Down, Ireland
- Died: 17 June 1943 (aged 74); St. Dominic's Parish, London, England
- Occupations: Scholar and priest
- Years active: 1894–1943
- Known for: Catholic Apologetics
- Notable work: The Church and the Land

Ecclesiastical career
- Religion: Catholic Church
- Ordained: 19 September 1891

Scan of The Decrees of the Vatican Council by Vincent McNabb, 1907

Vincent McNabb OP (8 July 1868 – 17 June 1943) was an Irish Catholic scholar and Dominican priest based in London who was active in evangelisation and apologetics.

== Early life ==
Joseph McNabb was born in Portaferry, County Down, Ireland, the tenth of eleven children. He was educated during his schooldays at the diocesan seminary of St. Malachy's College, Belfast. In November 1885 he joined the Dominican order, taking ‘Vincent’ as his name in religion. He underwent his novitiate at Woodchester, and was professed on 28 November 1889 and ordained on 19 September 1891. He studied at the University of Louvain (1891–4), receiving the degree of lector in sacred theology in 1894.

== Career ==
Fr. McNabb was a member of the Dominican order for 58 years and served as professor of philosophy at Hawkesyard Priory, prior at Woodchester, parish priest at St. Dominic's Priory, and prior and librarian at Holy Cross Priory, Leicester, as well as in various other official capacities for his Dominican province. In 1913 he preached and lectured in New York. McNabb was a frequent contributor to Blackfriars, the Dominican literary monthly published in Oxford. In 1919 Albert I of Belgium awarded McNabb with a medal of the Order of the Crown for his efforts on behalf of Belgium war relief.

Between 1929 and 1934, he lectured on the Summa Theologica of St. Thomas Aquinas under the auspices of the University of London External Lectures scheme. Tens of thousands of people heard him preach in Hyde Park for the Catholic Evidence Guild, where he took on challengers—Protestants, atheists, and freethinkers—before vast crowds every Sunday, or heard him debate intellectuals including George Bernard Shaw in the city's theaters and conference halls on the social issues of the day.

Fr. McNabb was described as a 13th-century monk living in 20th-century London, pursuing such tasks as reading the Old Testament (and taking notes on it) in Hebrew, reading the New Testament (and quoting from it) in Greek, and reading the works of St. Thomas Aquinas (and writing his reflections on them) in Latin. Throughout his life, Fr. McNabb had little to call his own, except his Bible, his breviary, and his copy of the Summa Theologica.

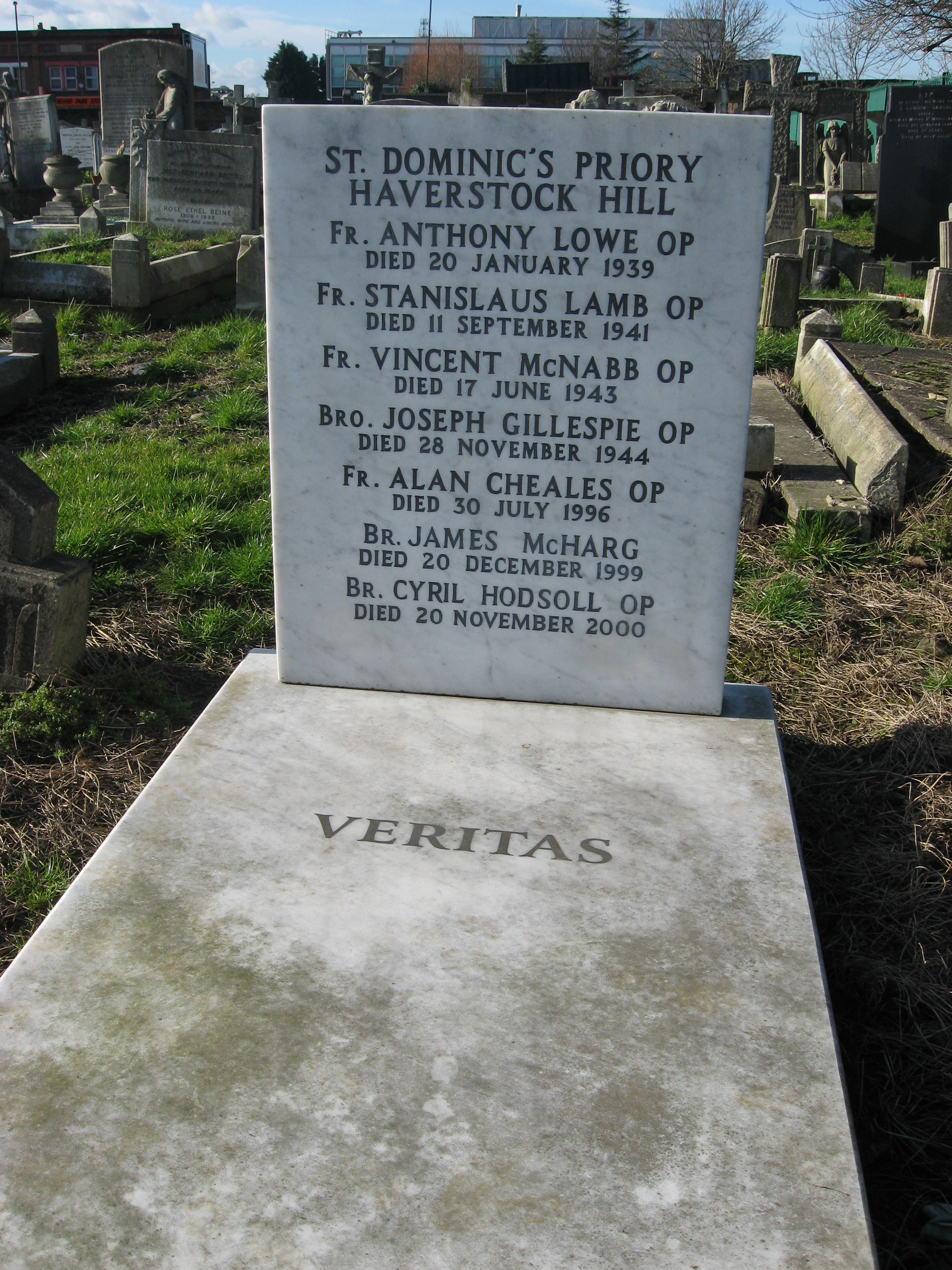
Fr. Vincent McNabb's grave

McNabb was among the early Catholic apologists who were seeking in particular to promote reunion between the Catholic Church and the Anglicans. Towards the end of his life, he wrote, "God knows how much I have striven and prayed to mend the shattered unity of Christendom; but never at the cost of shattering the unity of Faith, and therefore of Christ." As a young priest, he came under the influence of the convert-bishop William Robert Brownlow, (Note: Keldany mistakenly gives Brownlow's middle name as Charles.) who, after his reception into the Catholic Church by John Henry Newman, not only kept multiple Anglican friendships but made others among Nonconformists. Brownlow was the author of a work breathing a strong apologetic spirit titled Catholics and Nonconformists: or Dialogues on Conversion (1898). McNabb regarded him as one of his "masters and heroes" and wrote his biography. While prior at Woodchester, McNabb was in correspondence with Anglicans on both sides of the Atlantic. He was host to his Cotswolds neighbour, the Rev. Spencer Jones, rector of Moreton-in-Marsh, leading Anglo-Catholic and author of England and the Holy See: An Essay Towards Reunion (1902). He also contributed to the early issues of The Lamp, a paper edited by Fr. Paul Wattson, who, after becoming a Catholic, was to promote the Unity Octave through it for almost half a century. McNabb's lifelong interest in reunion culminated in his book The Church and Reunion (1937), published six years before his death.

McNabb sought also to promote a vision of social justice inspired by St. Thomas and by Pope Leo XIII's Rerum novarum, which called upon "every minister of holy religion... to bring to the struggle [for broad distribution of property] the full energy of his mind and all his powers of endurance", as well as to shore up both faith and reason against the threat of modernism.

== Death ==
He died at St. Dominic's Parish, London and was buried in St. Mary's Roman Catholic Cemetery, Kensal Green, London.

== Quotes about Fr. McNabb ==
"... he is one of the few great men I have met in my life; that he is great in many ways, mentally and morally and mystically and practically... nobody who ever met or saw or heard Father McNabb has ever forgotten him." G. K. Chesterton

"The greatness of his character, of his learning, his experience, and, above all, his judgement, was altogether separate from the world about him... the most remarkable aspect of all was the character of holiness... I can write here from intimate personal experience ... I have known, seen and felt holiness in person... I have seen holiness at its full in the very domestic paths of my life, and the memory of that experience, which is also a vision, fills me now as I write — so fills me that there is nothing now to say." Hilaire Belloc

"Father Vincent is the only person I have ever known about whom I have felt, and said more than once, 'He gives you some idea of what a saint must be like.' There was a kind of light about his presence which didn't seem to be quite of this world." Ronald Knox

== Works ==
- Bishop Brownlow (1830–1901). Catholic Truth Society (1902)
- Where Believers May Doubt: or Studies in Biblical Inspiration and Other Problems of Faith. Burns and Oates (1903)
- Oxford Conferences on Prayer. Kegan Paul (1903)
- Oxford Conferences on Faith. Kegan Paul (1905)
- Infallibility. Longmans Green (1905)
- Our Reasonable Service: An Essay on the Understanding of the Deep Things of God. Burns and Oates (1912)
- The Children's Hour of Heaven on Earth. P.J. Kenedy (1914)
- Europe's Ewe-Lamb and Other Essays on the Great War. R & T Washbourne (1916)
- The Doctrinal Witness of the Fourth Gospel. Catholic Truth Society pamphlet (1922)
- From a Friar's Cell. P.J. Kenedy (1923)
- The Mysticism of St. Thomas. Basil Blackwell (1924)
- The Church and the Land. Burns Oates and Washbourne (1926)
- The Catholic Church and Philosophy (with an introduction by Hilaire Belloc). Burns Oates and Washbourne (1927)
- The New Testament Witness to St. Peter. Sheed and Ward (1928)
- St. Thomas Aquinas and Law (pamphlet). Blackfriars (1929)
- Thoughts Twice-Dyed. Sheed and Ward (1930)
- The New Testament Witness to Our Blessed Lady. Sheed and Ward (1930)
- God's Book and Other Poems. St. Dominic's Press (1931)
- Nazareth or Social Chaos. Burns Oates and Washbourne (1933)
- Geoffrey Chaucer: A Study in His Genius and Ethics. St. Dominic's Press (1934)
- The Wayside: A Priest's Gleanings. Burns Oates and Washbourne (1934)
- The Craft of Prayer. Burns Oates and Washbourne (1935)
- St. John Fisher. Sheed and Ward (1935)
- Francis Thompson and Other Essays (with an introduction by G. K. Chesterton). St. Dominic's Press (1935)
- The Science of Prayer (A Revised Edition of Oxford Conferences on Prayer). St. Dominic's Press (1936)
- The Craft of Suffering: Verbatim Notes of Instruction on Suffering Given During Retreats at the Cenacle Convents 1930–1935. Burns Oates and Washbourne (1936)
- God's Way of Mercy: Verbatim Notes of Retreat Instructions. Burns Oates and Washbourne (1936)
- Frontiers of Faith and Reason. Sheed and Ward (1937)
- God's Good Cheer. Burns Oates and Washbourne (1937)
- St. Elizabeth of Portugal. Sheed and Ward (1937)
- The Church and Reunion: Some Thoughts on Christian Reunion. Burns Oates and Washbourne (1937)
- In Our Valley: Notes of Retreat Instructions. Burns Oates and Washbourne. (1938)
- A Life of Jesus Christ Our Lord. Sheed and Ward (1938)
- Joy in Believing. Burnes Oates and Washbourne (1939)
- Mary of Nazareth. P.J. Kenedy (1939)
- St. Mary Magdalen. Burnes Oates and Washbourne (1940)
- Eleven, Thank God! Memories of a Catholic Mother. Sheed and Ward (1940)
- Confession to a Priest. Catholic Truth Society pamphlet (1941)
- Some Mysteries of Jesus Christ. Burns Oates and Washbourne (1941)
- Catholics and Nonconformists. Catholic Truth Society pamphlet (1942)
- Old Principles and the New Order. Sheed and Ward (1942)
- Did Jesus Christ Rise from the Dead? Catholic Truth Society pamphlet (1943)
- An Old Apostle Speaks (with a memoir by Fr. Gerald Vann, O.P.). Blackfriars (1946)
- Faith and Prayer. Blackfriars (1953)
- A Father McNabb Reader. P.J. Kenedy (1954)
- The Prayers of Fr. McNabb (pamphlet). Newman Press (1955)
- A Vincent McNabb Anthology: Selections from the Writings of Vincent McNabb, O.P. Blackfriars (1955)
- Stars of Comfort: Retreat Conferences. Burns Oates and Washbourne (1957)
- Meditations on St. John. Aquin Press (1962)

== Literature ==
- Brownlow, William Robert (1898). Catholics and nonconformists: or Dialogues on conversion. London: Catholic Truth Society.
- Cunningham, Angela (1983). "Prophecy and the poor: Fr Vincent McNabb and distributism". New Blackfriars. 64 (752). Wiley-Blackwell: 52–64. doi:10.1111/j.1741-2005.1983.tb02590.x. ISSN 0028-4289.
- Hatts, Leigh (16 January 2008). "Octave that began on a small scale". Church Times.
- Hennessy, Michael (2002). "Father Vincent McNabb: A voice of contradiction". Vincent McNabb. Archived from the original on 1 November 2016.
- Hohen, Matthew (1947). Catholic Authors. St. Mary's Abbey.
- Keldany, Herbert (1979). "Father Vincent McNabb: Pioneer ecumenist". New Blackfriars. 60 (712). Wiley-Blackwell: 367–370. doi:10.1111/j.1741-2005.1979.tb02460.x. ISSN 0028-4289.
- Puglisi, James F. (2 April 2008). "Historical profile: Founder of the octave of prayer for Christian unity". L'Osservatore Romano (Weekly Edition in English ed.). p. 9.
