= Catholic Evidence Guild =

Catholic organization

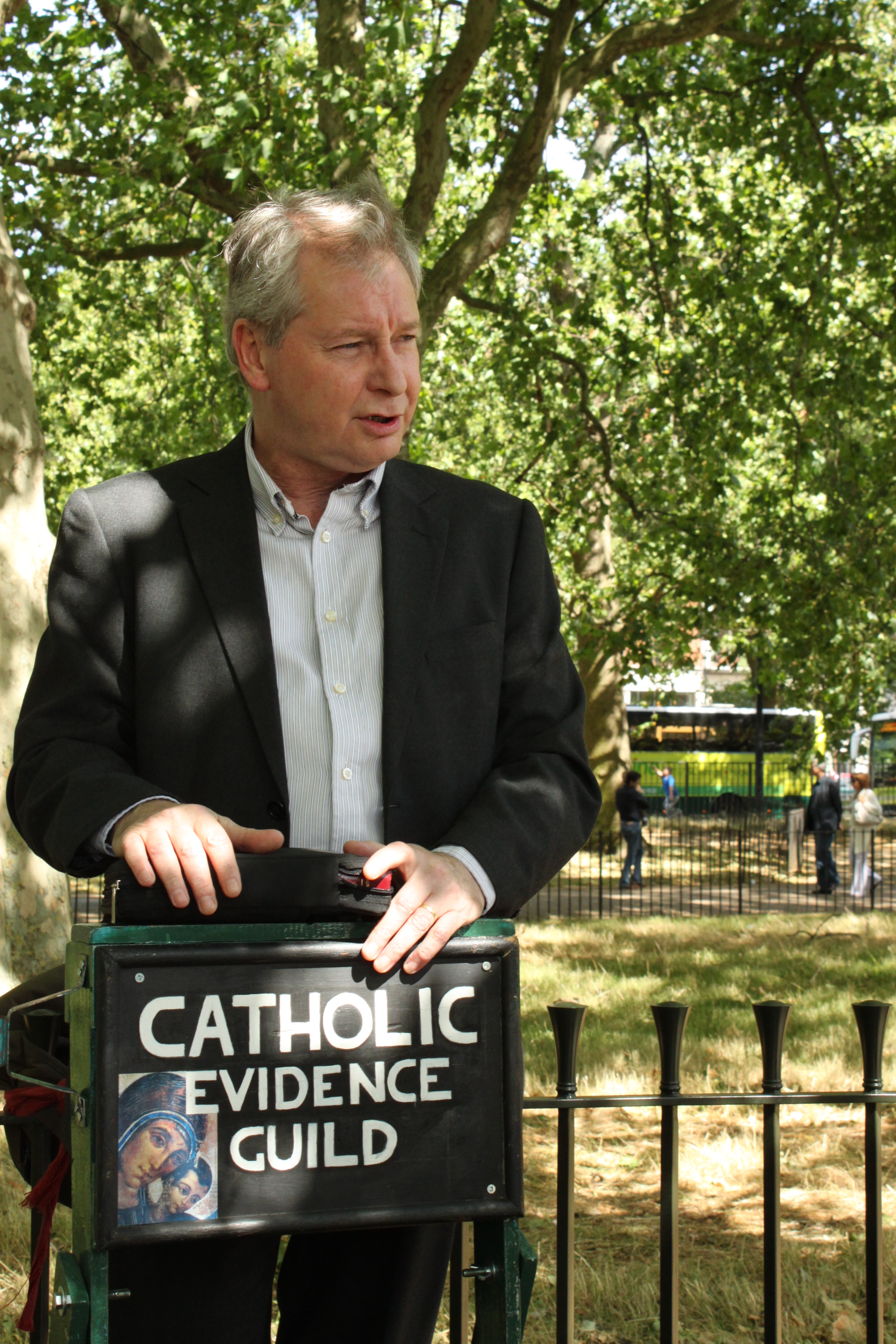
Catholic Evidence Guild at Speaker's Corner

The Catholic Evidence Guild is a loose international association of Roman Catholic lay volunteers which researches and presents explanations of the doctrine of the Roman Catholic Church. Their objective is to address incorrect impressions about the Church and its teachings. Individual groups are subject to the respective diocesan bishop.

== History ==
The organisation was founded in the Diocese of Westminster, England towards the end of 1918. By 1925 there were 20 to 30 branches throughout England. That year Maisie Ward published a practical training outline.

The Westminster branch has spoken regularly at Speakers' Corner since its inception. Prospective speakers were put through a strict training system by the Guild, with the goal of enabling "the ordinary Catholic to explain the truths of his religion in such a way as to reach the understanding of the crowd."

A branch was formed in New York City by students of Fordham University, which in 1931 undertook radio broadcasts published pamphlets, and wrote magazine articles. Their first outdoor meeting was held in 1936 at Columbus Circle. Guild member Paul Dearing, who worked for the National Catholic Welfare Council War Relief was one of fourteen people killed July 28, 1945 when a B-25 crashed into the Council's offices in the Empire State Building. Dearing had given a talk only the evening before.

There is also currently a branch in Guam (est. 2003).

== Notable members ==
- Vincent McNabb O.P.
- Frank Sheed (member from c. 1922–1981)
- Maisie Ward (member from 1919-1975)
- Catherine Cecily O'Brien
