= Nicholas O'Conor =

Anglo-Irish diplomat (1843–1908)

The Right Honourable Sir Nicholas O'Conor GCB, GCMG
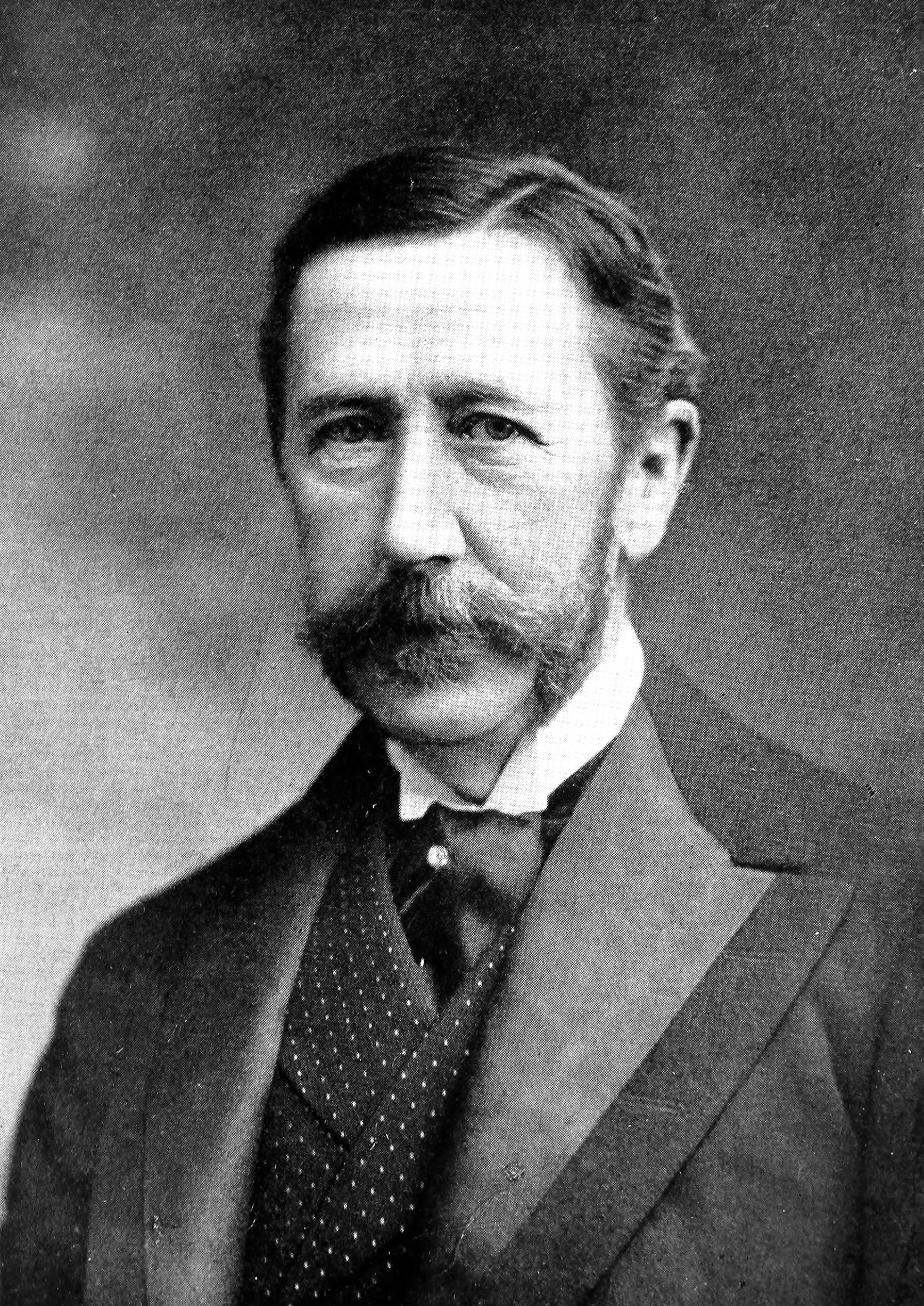
- Born: Nicholas Roderick O'Conor; 3 July 1843; Dundermott House, Dundermott Ballymoe, County Roscommon, Ireland
- Died: 19 March 1908 (aged 64); Constantinople, Ottoman Empire
- Occupations: Diplomat, ambassador
- Spouse: Minna O'Conor
- Children: 3
- Relatives: Matila Ghyka (son-in-law)

Sir Nicholas Roderick O'Conor GCB, GCMG, PC (Irish: Nioclás Ruairí Ó Conchobhair Donn; 3 July 1843 – 19 March 1908) was an Anglo-Irish diplomat. When he died, Sir Nicholas was the British ambassador to Turkey.

== Early life ==
O'Conor was born on 3 July 1843 at Dundermot House, in Dundermot, Ballymoe to Patrick O'Conor, a Justice of the peace and later High sheriff, and Jane O'Conor (née French). (Note: Also cited as Ffrench.) The youngest of three sons, O'Conor was a member of the cadet branch of the Catholic O'Conor Don family.

Educated at St Stanislaus and Stonyhurst College, O'Conor also studied in Munich and at UCLouvain.

== Career ==
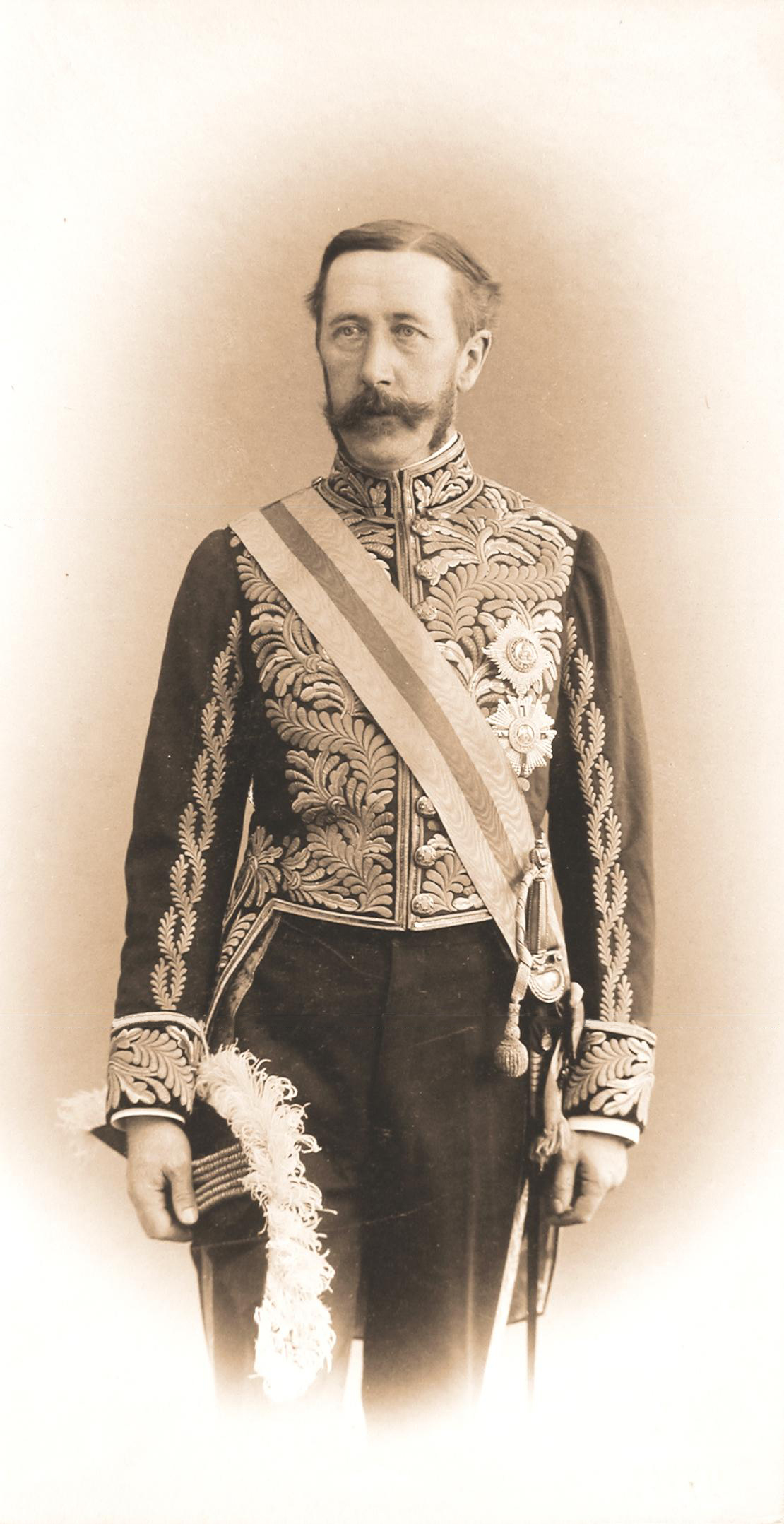
Nicholas Roderick O'Conor. Russia, Saint-Petersburg, 1895-1898

O'Conor entered the diplomatic service in 1866. In his early years, he was attached to the Embassy in Berlin, achieving the rank of Third Secretary in 1870. He served as Secretary at the Hague, Madrid, Rio de Janeiro, and Paris. He was trained in the diplomatic service by Richard Lyons, 1st Viscount Lyons, and was a member of the Tory-sympathetic 'Lyons School' of British diplomacy. He was Secretary and Chargé d'Affaires at Peking and Washington, Political Agent and Consul-General in Bulgaria.

=== Head of Mission ===
O'Conor's first ministerial appointment was at the British Legation at Peking.

- 1892: In Seoul, O'Conor was the British Minister to the Korea.
- 1895: In St. Petersburg, he was Ambassador of His Britannic Majesty in the Imperial court of the Russian Czar.
- 1898: In Constantinople, he was Ambassador to the Court of the Sublime Porte of the Ottoman Empire.

In 1896, O'Conor was made a Privy Counsellor.

O'Conor died in Constantinople following a hemorrhage of the stomach. He was the first British ambassador to die in post in Turkey since Sir Edward Barton, Ambassador of Queen Elizabeth I to Sultan Mehmet III, died in 1598 at the Panagia Apsinthiotissa (now in Cyprus).

== Family ==
He was married to Minna O'Conor daughter of James Robert Hope-Scott, Q.C. (1812–1873) and Lady Victoria Hope-Scott (1840–1870). They had three daughters:

Eldest daughter: Fearga Victoria Mary O'Conor (b. 1892, d. 22 March 1969), married her half first cousin, Rear-Admiral Malcolm Raphael Joseph Constable-Maxwell-Scott, son of Hon. Joseph Constable-Maxwell-Scott and Mary Monica Hope-Scott, on 6 September 1918. She died on 22 March 1969. They had three children:

1. Sir Michael Fergus Constable-Maxwell-Scott, 13th Bt. of the Constable Maxwell-Scott baronets (b. 23 Jul 1921, d. 29 Nov 1989)
2. Elizabeth Mary Constable-Maxwell-Scott (b. 28 May 1924, d. 1991)
3. Ian Malcolm Constable-Maxwell-Scott (b. 18 July 1927, d. 27 November 1993)

Middle daughter: Muriel Margaret Minna O'Conor (b. 1894), married Charles Joseph Nevile, son of Ralph Henry Christopher Nevile, on 21 April 1919.

Youngest daughter: Eileen Winifred Madeleine O'Conor (1897-1963), married, in 1918, at the Brompton Oratory, to Romanian Prince Matyla Ghyka (1881–1965).

== Arms ==
Coat of arms of Nicholas O'Conor

Notes
Granted on 4 September 1890 by Sir John Bernard Burke, Ulster King of Arms.
Crest
On a wreath Argent and Vert out of an Irish crown as in the arms an arm embowed in armour the hand grasping a sword all Proper.
Escutcheon
Argent an oak tree eradicated Proper supported by two lions rampant combatant Sable in chief an ancient Irish crown Or and in base three lizards passant to the sinister barwise Vert.
Motto
(The Valiant Hand Of Ireland)

== Notes ==
Diplomatic posts
| Preceded by Sir Frank Lascelles | British Ambassador to Russia; 1896 – 1898 | Succeeded by Charles Stewart Scott |
| Preceded by Philip Currie | Ambassador to the Ottoman Empire; 1898 – 1908 | Succeeded by Sir George Head Barclay |
