= Mary Barr Mackinlay =

Australian Dominican nun (1910 – 1974)

- Born: August 28, 1910; Temora, New South Wales, Australia
- Died: November 13, 1974 (aged 64); Lewisham, New South Wales, Australia
- Other names: Sister Alphonse Marie
- Occupation(s): nun, teacher

Mary Barr Mackinlay (28 August 1910 – 13 November 1974), later known as Sister Alphonse Marie, was an Australian Dominican sister who spent many years teaching.

== Life ==
Mackinlay was born in Temora in 1910. Her parents lived in Pucawan. Her parents, Ellen Theresa (born Duffy) and John Barr Mackinlay, a farmer, were born in Australia. She was the third of their five children, although she had two adopted siblings. She said she was taught well at the local one-teacher school.

She studied at Santa Sabina Dominican Convent School, where Sister Mary Anhelm, another learning enthusiast, taught her. She supported her idea of studying English Literature. Mackinlay was a school sportswoman who also passed four other A levels, but it was in English that she was the best in the state.

The Sancta Sophia College of the University of Sydney opened in 1926 as the first for Catholic women. Mackinlay began her studies there in 1930, and she graduated in 1933. She converted that into a first-class master's degree in 1935, although she was already a novice at the Dominican Roman Catholic Convent in Maitland. She had taught at the convent's school since 1934. Her thesis was on Mysticism in Modern English Poetry.

In 1963, she joined the Dominican Congregation's provincial council and was its provincial director of studies. She held this position until 1969.

Mackinlay died in 1974 after a severe stroke in the Sydney suburb of Lewisham.
