= John J. Castelot =

American priest, teacher & writer (1916–1999)

John J. Castelot S.S.
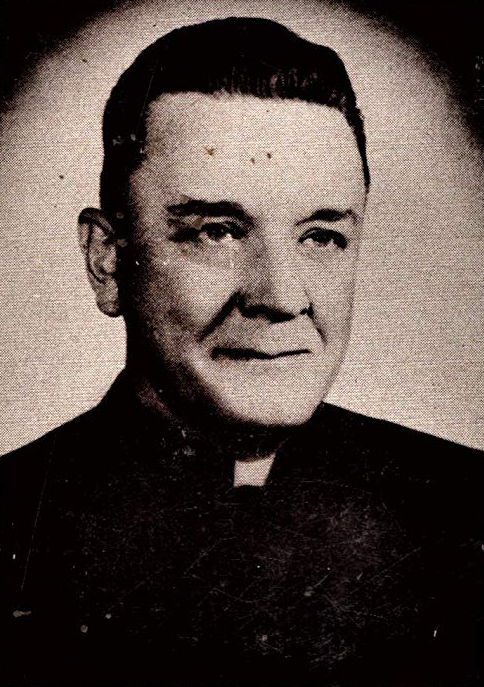
- Church: Catholic
- Diocese: Archdiocese of Detroit

Orders
- Ordination: May 14, 1942

Personal details
- Born: August 28, 1916
- Died: May 14, 1999 (aged 82)

John J. Castelot, S.S. (August 26, 1916 – May 14, 1999) was an American Catholic priest, Sulpician, teacher, and writer.

== Early life and studies ==
John J. Castelot was born in Bridgeport, Connecticut, United States, on August 26, 1916. He was ordained priest on May 14, 1942. Later on he did graduate studies at the Catholic University of America, Washington, D.C. and at the Pontifical Biblical Institute in Rome. Fr. John Castelot, also known as Fr. Jack, was a Sulpician and priest of the Archdiocese of Detroit.

== Career ==
After his studies, John J. Castelot was teacher of Sacred Scripture, Greek, Hebrew, and Sacred Music at the St. John's Provincial Seminary, in Plymouth, Michigan, but he also taught at St Joseph's College, Mountain View, California and at the Sulpitian Novitiate in Baltimore, Maryland. From 1972 he was a collaborator at St. Edith's Parish in Livonia, Michigan.

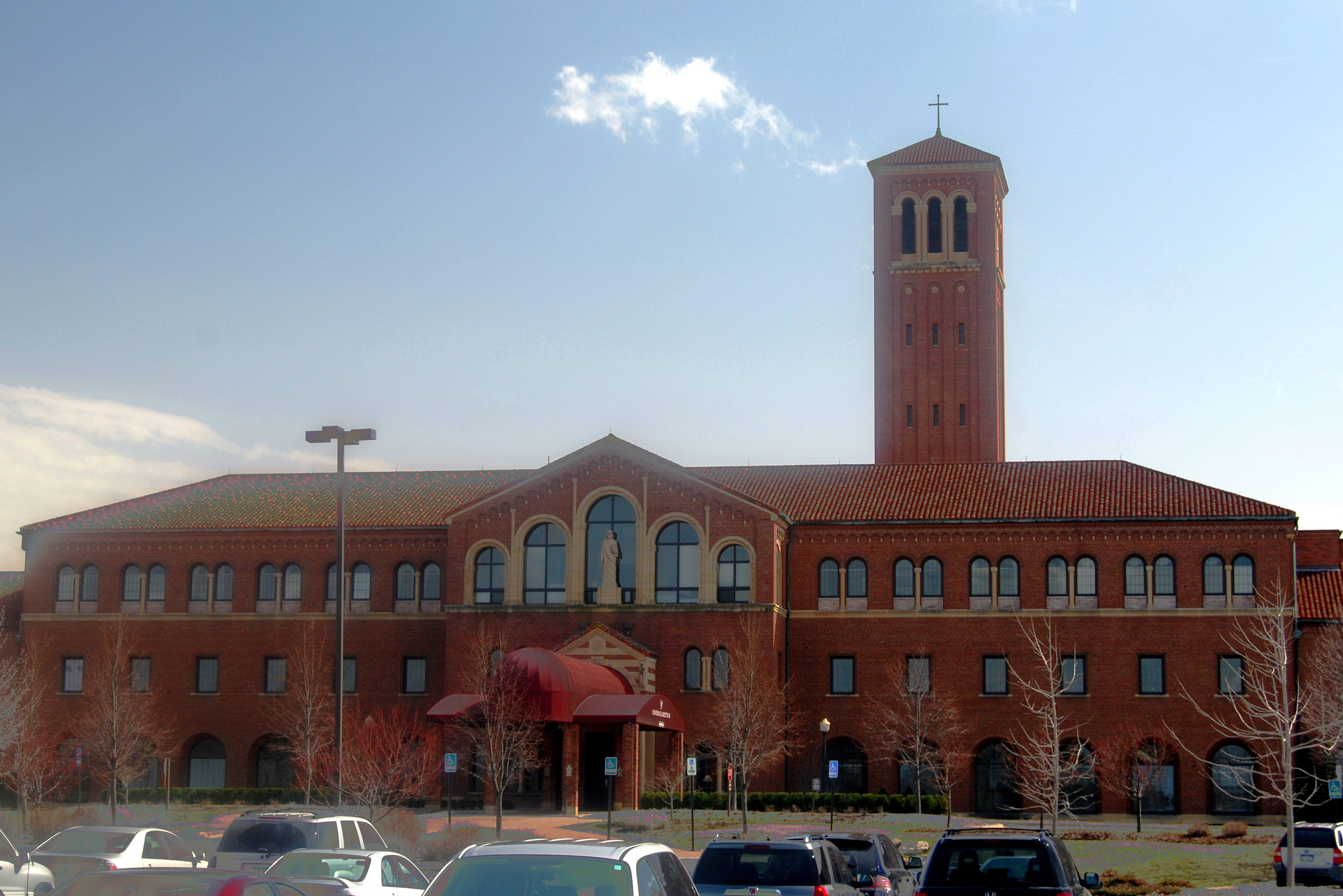
St John's Provincial Seminary

Castelot Summer Scripture (now Castelot Scripture), a conference named in honor of Fr. John (Jack) Castelot, started at St. John's Provincial Seminary in 1996. Fr. John died on May 14, 1999.

== Works ==
Castelot wrote the three volumes of Meet the Bible! and a shorter commentary on the Holy Scripture. For more than 20 years he wrote a column on the Bible for the "Faith Alive!" a religious education series distributed by Catholic News Service. He wrote the voices "Gentiles", "St. Peter Apostle", and "Gerard Van Noort" for the New Catholic Encyclopedia. For The Jerome Biblical Commentary (1968), he wrote, in collaboration with Aelred Cody, the chapter "Religious institutions of Israel".
