= Wilfrid Sheed =

British-American novelist (1930–2011)

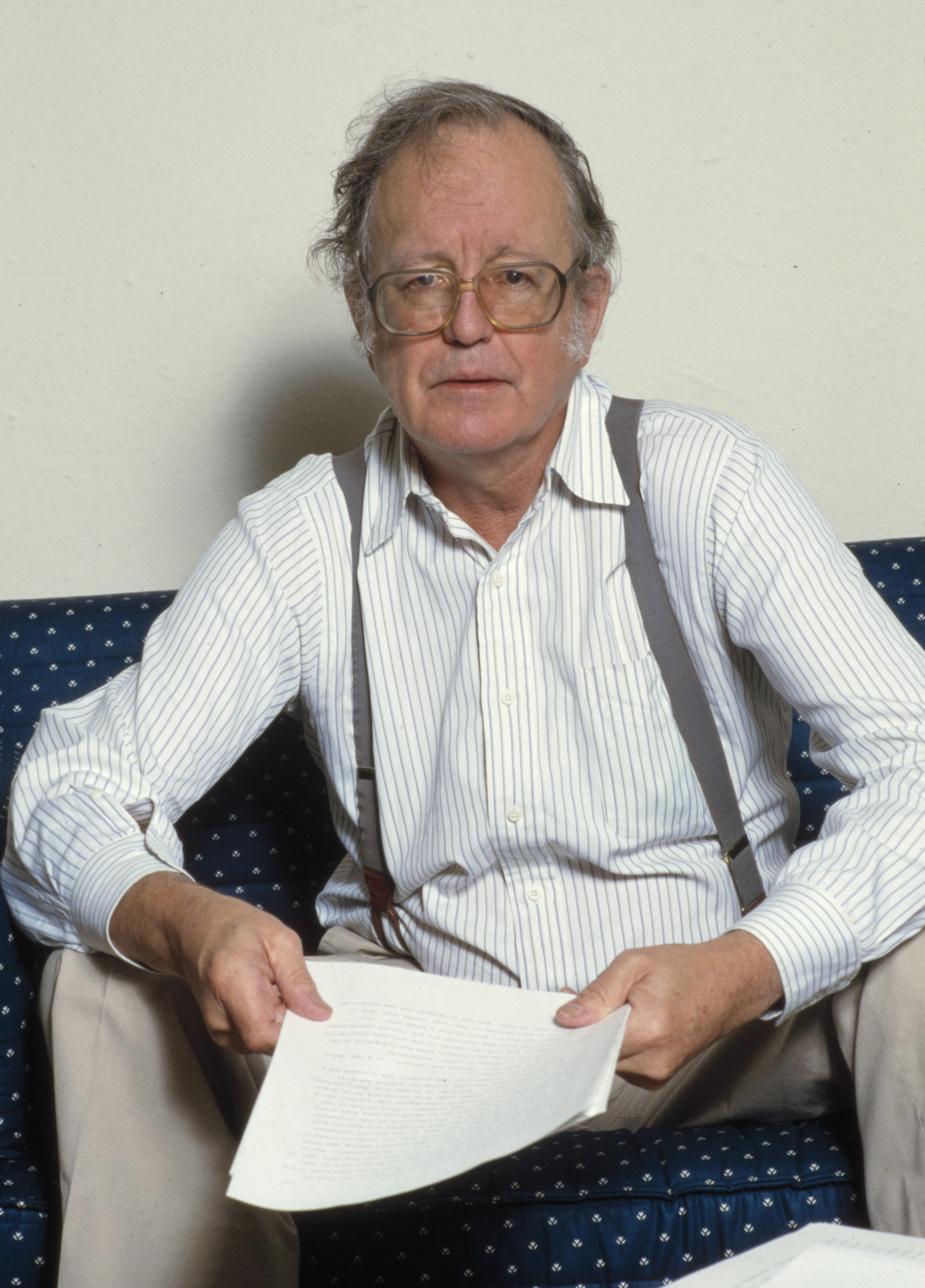
Wilfrid Sheed in 1987

Wilfrid John Joseph Sheed (27 December 1930 – 19 January 2011) was an English-born American novelist and essayist.

== Biography ==
Sheed was born in London, to Frank Sheed and Maisie Ward, prominent Catholic publishers (Sheed & Ward) in the United Kingdom and the United States during the mid-20th century. Wilfrid Sheed spent his childhood in both England and the United States before attending Downside School and Lincoln College, Oxford where he earned BA (1954) and MA (1957) degrees.

Sheed's first novel, A Middle Class Education (1961; earlier in the UK), was based on his experiences at Oxford. His biography Frank and Maisie was about his parents' literary establishment and intellectual world. He wrote satirical novels about journalism and memoirs in his later years. His book on American popular music, entitled The House that George Built with a little help from Irving, Cole and a Crew of about Fifty was published in 2008.

Garrison Keillor commented in a review of the book:

Golden Age of American Song has been saluted and high-faluted in books and wept over repeatedly, but "The House That George Built" is a big rich stew of an homage that makes you want to listen to Gershwin and Berlin and Porter and Arlen all over again ... Sheed's jazzy prose is a joy to read. It goes catapulting along, digressing like mad, never pedantic, a little frantic, which is just right: the jazz song, like all true art, is a flight from depression, indifference, the cold blank stare, the earnest clammy touch.

== Family ==
Sheed was a great-great-grandson of William Ward and of Henry Fitzalan-Howard, 14th Duke of Norfolk, and Augusta Mary Minna Catherine Lyons; a great-grandson of William George Ward; a grandson of Wilfrid Philip Ward; a nephew of Father Leo Ward, a missioner in Japan; the son of Maisie Ward and Frank Sheed, the co-founders of Sheed & Ward; and the brother of the translator, Rosemary Sheed. Among Sheed's more remote ancestors was John Howard, 1st Duke of Norfolk.

He married Maria Bullitt Darlington in 1957 and they had three children; the marriage ended in divorce in 1967. He married cookbook author Miriam Ungerer in 1972. At his death he was survived by his second wife, three children, a sister, two stepdaughters and four grandchildren.

The English writer and journalist Gilbert Keith Chesterton was his godfather.

== Death ==
Sheed had polio as a child, and began suffering from post-polio symptoms in his 50s. He died on 19 January 2011 at age 80 in Great Barrington, Massachusetts.

== Published works ==
- A Middle Class Education. 1961.
- The Hack. 1963.
- Square's Progress. New York: Farrar, Straus & Giroux, 1965.
- Office Politics. 1966; with a foreword by Gerald Howard, New York : McNally Editions, 2024, ISBN 978-1-961341-18-0
- The Blacking Factory. 1968.
- Max Jamison. New York: Farrar, Straus & Giroux, 1970.
- The Morning After: Selected essays and reviews. New York: Farrar, Straus & Giroux, 1971. ISBN 0-374-21305-4.
- People Will Always Be Kind. New York: Farrar, Straus & Giroux, 1973. ISBN 0-374-23071-4.
- Three Mobs: Labor, church, and Mafia. New York: Sheed & Ward, 1974. ISBN 0-8362-0586-3.
- Muhammad Ali: A Portrait in Words and Photographs. Orion Publishing Group. 1975. ISBN 0-297-77032-2
- The Good Word & Other Words. New York: Dutton, 1978. ISBN 0-525-11592-7.
- Transatlantic Blues New York: Dutton, 1978. ISBN 978-0-525-22226-2.
- Clare Boothe Luce. New York: Dutton, 1982. ISBN 0-525-03055-7.
- Frank and Maisie: A memoir with parents. New York: Simon & Schuster, 1985. ISBN 0-671-44990-7.
- The Boys of Winter: A novel. New York: Alfred A. Knopf, 1987. ISBN 0-394-55874-X.
- Essays in Disguise. New York: Alfred A. Knopf, 1990. ISBN 0-394-55875-8.
- Baseball and Lesser Sports. New York: HarperCollins Publishers, 1991. ISBN 0-06-016531-6.
- My Life as a Fan. New York: Simon & Schuster, 1993. ISBN 0-671-76710-0.
- In Love with Daylight: A memoir of recovery. New York: Simon & Schuster, 1995. ISBN 0-671-79215-6.
- The House that George Built with a little help from Irving, Cole and a Crew of about Fifty. New York: Random House, 2007 ISBN 978-1-4000-6105-1.

== Awards and honours ==
- 1967 finalist, National Book Award for Fiction, for his novel Office Politics
- 1987 Grammy Award for Best Album Notes for his liner notes for The Voice – The Columbia Years 1943–1952, performed by Frank Sinatra.
