= James Hope-Scott =

British Catholic lawyer (1812–1873)

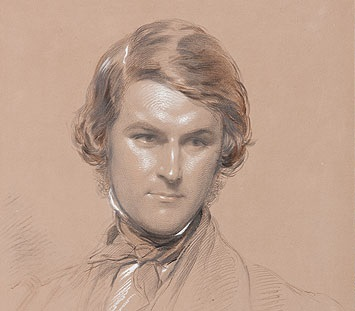

James Robert Hope-Scott (15 July 1812 – 29 April 1873) was a British barrister and Tractarian.

== Early life and conversion ==
Born at Great Marlow, in the county of Buckinghamshire, and christened James Robert, Hope was the third son of General Sir Alexander Hope and his wife Georgina Alicia (d. 1855), third and youngest daughter of George Brown of Ellerton, Roxburghshire. He was a grandson of John Hope, 2nd Earl of Hopetoun. After a childhood spent at the Royal Military College, Sandhurst, of which his father was Governor, he was educated at Eton College and Christ Church, Oxford, where he was a contemporary and friend of William Ewart Gladstone and John Henry Newman. In 1838 Hope was called to the bar at Lincoln's Inn. Between 1840 and 1843 he helped to found Trinity College, Glenalmond, now renamed Glenalmond College. In 1840–1841 he spent some eight months in Italy, Rome included, in company with his close friend Edward Badeley.

On his return he became, with Newman, one of the foremost promoters of the Tractarian movement at Oxford and was entirely in Newman's confidence. In 1841, he published an attack on the Anglican-German Bishopric in Jerusalem, and further defended the "value of the science of canon law, in a pamphlet. Edward Bouverie Pusey also valued Hope's advice and canvassed him in 1842 before publishing the Letter to the Archbishop of Canterbury on some Circumstances connected with the Present Crisis in the Church. Hope supported publication.

Along with other Anglo-Catholics, Hope was disturbed by the Gorham judgment, and on 12 March 1850 a meeting was held at his house in Curzon Street, London, which was attended by fourteen leading Tractarians, including Badeley, Henry Edward Manning, and Archdeacon Robert Isaac Wilberforce. They eventually published a series of resolutions which started the process of distancing Hope, Badeley, Manning and Wilberforce from the Anglican Church.

In 1851, Hope was received with Manning into the Roman Catholic Church.

== Legal practice ==
On 15 June 1841, Hope wrote to Gladstone:

My reason for staying in town is to read ecclesiastical law, and to prepare (if so be) for election committees. The former branch I reckon my flower-garden, the latter my cabbage-field.

Ormsby believed that Hope found some distraction from his frustration with the Anglican Church through his secular work.

By 1839, Hope was becoming involved in parliamentary work. He was retained as counsel for the British government on the Foreign Marriages Bill and in 1843, the report on the Consular Jurisdiction Bill. His brother's appointment as Under Secretary of State for the Colonies in Sir Robert Peel's administration may have opened some doors. In 1843-44 he was engaged again by the government in the matter of the aftermath of the Pastry War, whose settlement Britain had arbitrated, to prepare a report on some points in dispute between France and Mexico.

As an established ecclesiastical lawyer, he was much involved in the Ecclesiastical Courts Bill in 1843 and the same year he took the DCL degree at Oxford. In 1844 an English Criminal Code was under serious consideration and Bishop of London Charles James Blomfield recommended Hope to the Lord Chancellor John Copley, 1st Baron Lyndhurst as a commissioner to consider offences against religion and the Church. By the end of 1845 he stood at the head of the parliamentary bar but his objections to taking the Oath of Supremacy deterred him from accepting the professional honour of Queen's Counsel. In 1849, he therefore asked Lord Chancellor Charles Pepys, 1st Earl of Cottenham for, and was granted, a patent of precedence conferring equal status.

In 1852 he gave Newman the disastrously misleading legal advice that he was unlikely to be sued for libel by Giacinto Achilli, advice which ultimately led to Newman's criminal conviction for defamatory libel. Thereafter, Newman relied on Badeley for legal advice, though in 1855 Hope-Scott conducted the negotiations which ended in Newman's accepting the rectorship of the Catholic University of Ireland.

== Personal and family life ==
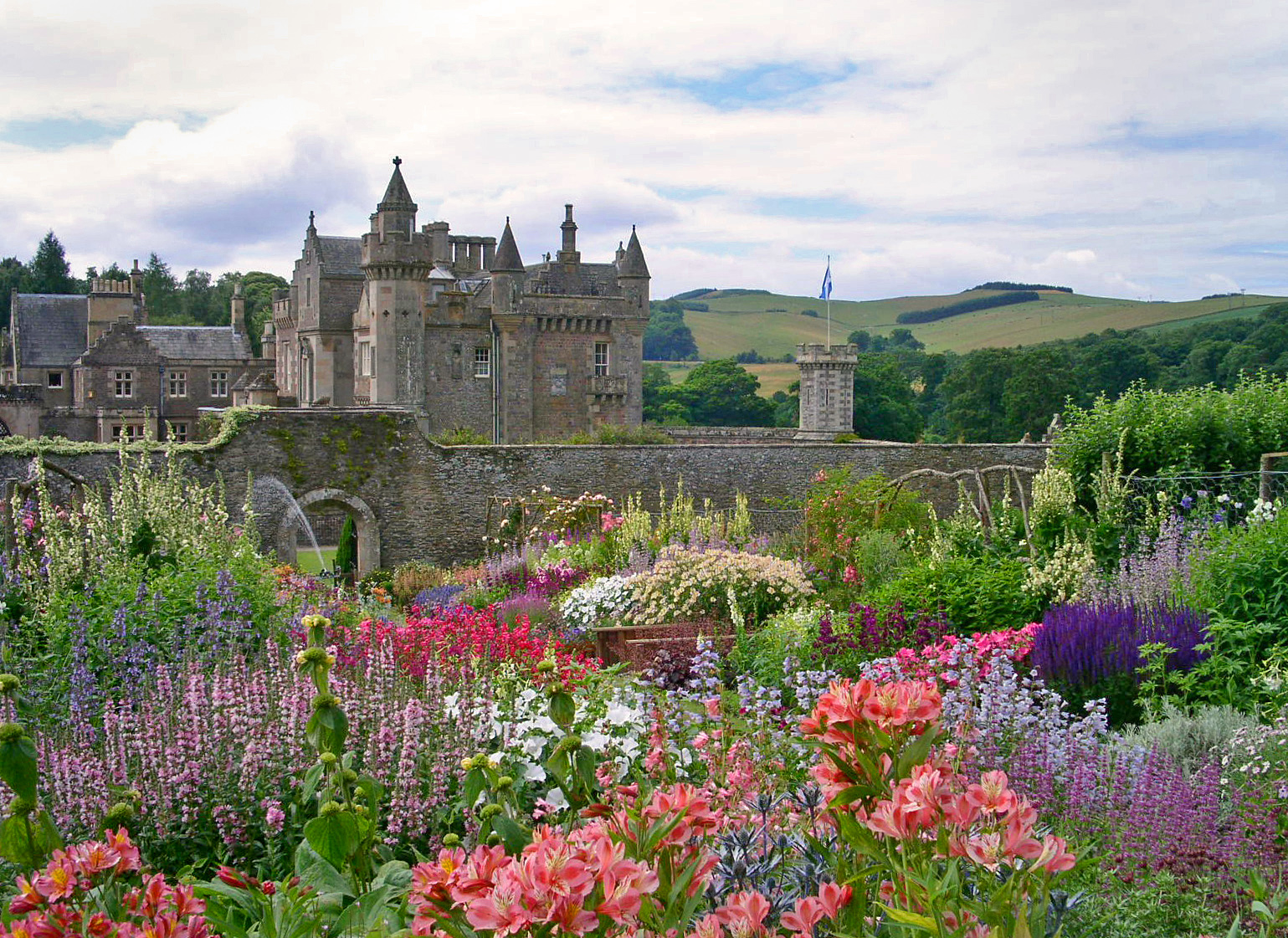
Abotsford House, Scotland.

1. In 1847, James Hope married firstly to Charlotte Harriet Jane Lockhart, daughter of John Gibson Lockhart and granddaughter of Sir Walter Scott. Six years after their marriage Charlotte came into possession of Scott's Abbotsford House estate, and Hope then assumed the surname of Hope-Scott. His wife died on 26 October 1858.
  1. Mary Monica (born 2 October 1852) m. Joseph Constable Maxwell, third son of William, Lord Herries
2. In 1861, he married secondly to Lady Victoria Alexandrina Fitzalan-Howard, a daughter of the 14th Duke of Norfolk.
  1. James Fitzalan Hope (1870–1949), who was created Baron Rankeillour
  2. Josephine Ward, novelist
  3. Minna Margaret m. diplomat Sir Nicolas Roderick O'Conor

Hope-Scott retired from the bar in 1870 and spent the rest of his life in charitable and literary work, in particular in making an abridgement of his father-in-law's seven-volume biography of Scott, with a preface dedicated to Gladstone. Hope-Scott maintained a lifelong correspondence with Badeley.

Both his wives died in childbirth. The only child by his first marriage to survive to adulthood, Mary Monica (born 2 October 1852), married Joseph Constable Maxwell, third son of William, Lord Herries. (James and Charlotte Hope's two other children died in infancy.) By his second marriage, he left a son, James Fitzalan Hope (1870–1949), who was created Baron Rankeillour, and three daughters, one of whom was the novelist Josephine Ward and another of whom married the diplomat Sir Nicolas Roderick O'Conor. (Two other children from the second marriage died young.)

== Bibliography ==
- Obituaries:
  - The Scotsman, 8 May 1873
  - Edinburgh Courant, 8 May 1873
  - The Tablet, 10 May 1873
  - Law Times, 10 May 1873
  - The Month, 19 (1873), 274–91

- Herbermann, Charles, ed. (1910). "James Robert Hope-Scott" . Catholic Encyclopedia. Vol. 7. New York: Robert Appleton Company.
- Hope, J. R. (1842). The Bishopric of the United Church of England and Ireland at Jerusalem, Considered in a Letter to a Friend (2nd ed. revised ed.). London: C. J. Stewart.
- Lockhart, J. G. (1871). J. R. Hope-Scott (ed.). The Life of Sir Walter Scott, Bart. Edinburgh: Adam & Charles Black.
- Courtney, W. P.; Murphy, G. Martin. "Badeley, Edward Lowth". Oxford Dictionary of National Biography (online ed.). Oxford University Press. doi:10.1093/ref:odnb/1019. (Subscription, Wikipedia Library access or UK public library membership required.)
- Ormsby, R., ed. (1884). Memoirs of James Robert Hope-Scott, with Selections from His Correspondence (2 vols. ed.). London: John Murray.
