= Frank Sheed =

Australian-British Catholic lawyer, apologist, and publisher (1897–1981)

Francis Joseph Sheed (20 March 1897 – 20 November 1981) was an Australian-born lawyer, Catholic writer, publisher, speaker, and lay theologian. He and his wife Maisie Ward were the names behind the imprint Sheed & Ward and as forceful public lecturers in the Catholic Evidence Guild.

== Life and career ==
=== Early life ===
Sheed was born in Sydney on 20 March 1897 to John Sheed, a descendant of Scottish Presbyterians, and English-born Mary Maloney. His mother's family were Irish Catholic. Baptized Catholic, at the insistence of their father, Frank Sheed and his brother Jack were raised Protestant. Frank attended a Methodist church but surreptitiously made his Catholic First Holy Communion and Confirmation. He attended Sydney Boys’ High School and in 1917 obtained a B.A. from the University of Sydney.

=== Catholic Evidence Guild ===
In 1920, Sheed travelled to London, where he encountered the Catholic Evidence Guild whose lay Catholics expounded the faith. He joined the group and became an effective soapbox orator. With an understanding of Protestant attitudes toward Catholicism, Sheed took up writing and speaking on the subject of Catholic apologetics, the rational defense of the Catholic faith. Through his activity with the Guild he met Maisie Ward, daughter of Wilfrid Ward, a prominent Catholic essayist and biographer.

== Sheed & Ward ==
Sheed and Maisie Ward were married in April 1926. That same year, they moved to London, where Sheed and Maisie's brother Leo established the publishing house of Sheed and Ward. When Leo Ward left to become a priest, Maisie took his place as publisher. Their son Wilfrid Sheed was an essayist and novelist; their daughter, Rosemary, a translator.

As publisher of an all-star roster including Karl Adam, Hilaire Belloc, G. K. Chesterton, Christopher Dawson, Ida Friederike Görres, Ronald Knox, Hugh Pope, and Evelyn Waugh, Sheed maintained a robust Catholic faith while keeping abreast of progressive trends. Frank Sheed wrote a constant stream of books touching on almost every aspect of basic theology, several of which remain in print. His translation of St. Augustine's Confessions remains acclaimed. In 1933 they opened a branch in New York and became "the most influential Catholic publishers in the English-speaking world".

In 1956 Lille Catholic University awarded him a doctorate in divinity. He published an autobiography, The Church and I (1974). Frank Sheed died on 20 November 1981 at Jersey City and was buried in the Holy Name cemetery.

== Works ==
- The Catholic Evidence Guild (1925)
- Nullity of Marriage (1931)
- A Map of Life (1933)
- Communism and Man (1945)
- Theology and Sanity (1947)
- Saints are Not Sad (1949)
- Society and Sanity (1953)
- Theology for Beginners (1957)
- To Know Christ Jesus (1962)
- What Difference Does Jesus Make? (1970)
- The Church and I [autobiography], Garden City, NY: Doubleday (1974)
- Christ In Eclipse, Kansas City: Sheed Andrews and McMeel (1978)
- The Instructed Heart (1979)

== Bibliography ==
- Frank Sheed (1974), The Church & I, Doubleday.
- Maisie Ward (1963), Unfinished Business, New York: Sheed & Ward.
- Maisie Ward (1973), To and Fro on the Earth: A Sequel to an Autobiography, New York: Sheed & Ward.
- Wilfrid Sheed (1985), Frank and Maisie: A Memoir with Parents, New York: Simon & Schuster.
- David Meconi (2011), Introductory Essay in Frank Sheed and Maisie Ward: Spiritual writings, Maryknoll: Orbis Books.
