= Sheed and Ward =

U.K.-U.S. publisher

- Parent company: Rowman & Littlefield
- Founded: 1926
- Founders: Frank Sheed and Maisie Ward
- Country of origin: UK
- Publication types: Books
- Nonfiction topics: Catholic literature
- Official website: rowman.com

Sheed and Ward is a publishing house founded in London in 1926 by Catholic activists Frank Sheed and Maisie Ward. The head office was moved to New York in 1933. The United States assets of Sheed and Ward have been owned by Rowman & Littlefield since 2002, and those in the United Kingdom are owned by Bloomsbury Publishing. In 2022 Rowman & Littlefield began acquiring books under the Sheed & Ward brand again.

== History ==
Sheed and Ward published a number of major Roman Catholic authors of the 1920s through to the mid-twentieth century, including G. K. Chesterton, Hilaire Belloc, Christopher Dawson, Vincent McNabb, Leo J. Trese, Ronald Knox and Etienne Gilson. In the early 1930s Sheed and Ward operated the Catholic Book a Month Club. In 1973, Sheed and Ward was acquired by the Universal Press Syndicate; the company was used as the base of the publisher Andrews McMeel. However, the Sheed and Ward name and backlist were later divested. The company was owned by the National Catholic Reporter from 1986 to 1998, when it was sold to the Priests of the Sacred Heart. The United States assets were acquired by Rowman & Littlefield in 2002, and the United Kingdom assets by the Continuum International Publishing Group, which has since been subsumed into Bloomsbury Publishing. The company archives of the New York office from 1933 to 1977 are kept at the University of Notre Dame.

== Book series ==
- American Benedictine Academy Studies
- Ark Library
- The Bernardin Center Series
- Boston College Church in the 21st Century Series
- Canterbury Books
- Capuchin Classics
- Catholic Masterpiece Tutorial Series
- Catholic Masters
- Come & See Series
- Dogma
- Essays in Order
- Exploring Scripture Series
- Great Religious Composers
- Hart Library
- Heythrop Series
- Lectio Divina Series
- Makers of Christendom
- Mysticism and Modern Man Series
- Newman History and Philosophy of Science Series
- New Testament for Spiritual Reading
- New World Chesterton
- Pastoral Ministry Series
- Permanent Chesterton
- Perspectives on Work, Welfare and Society Series
- Prayer and Practice
- Reader's Theatre
- Readings in Bioethics Series
- The Saints in Pictures
- Sheed & Ward Catholic Studies
- Sheed & Ward Classic series
- Spirit at Work Series
- Spiritual Masters
- Stagbooks
- St. Michael's Mediaeval Studies: Monograph Series
- Studies in Anthropology and Comparative Religion
- Theologians Today
- Theological Meditations
- Twelvepenny Series
- Unicorn Books
- Writers of the World
