= Haggerston (disambiguation) =

Haggerston may refer to:

- Haggerston, Northumberland, village

- Haggerston Castle, castle at Haggerston, Northumberland, England
- Haggerston Baronets

- Haggerston, place in the London Borough of Hackney
- Haggerston (ward), ward in the London Borough of Hackney
- Haggerston (London County Council constituency), former constituency
- Haggerston (UK Parliament constituency), former borough constituency centred on the Haggerston district of the Metropolitan Borough of Shoreditch in London
- Haggerston Island, island in Queensland, Australia
