= Haggerston, Northumberland =

Hamlet in Northumberland, England

Coordinates: 55.687°N 1.935°W

Haggerston
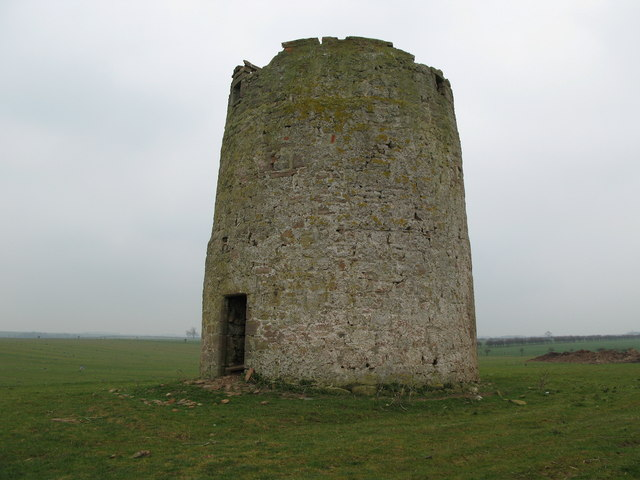
- Haggerston Mill

- Location within Northumberland
- OS grid reference: NU042436
- Unitary authority: Northumberland
- Ceremonial county: Northumberland
- Region: North East
- Country: England
- Sovereign state: United Kingdom
- Post town: BERWICK UPON TWEED
- Postcode district: TD15
- Police: Northumbria
- Fire: Northumberland
- Ambulance: North East
- UK Parliament: Berwick-upon-Tweed

Haggerston is a hamlet located in the county of Northumberland, England about 5 miles (8 km) south of Berwick-upon-Tweed and adjacent to the A1 road. Historically, it was a baronetcy in the civil parish of Ancroft, then located in County Durham. Today, it is best known for Haggerston Castle caravan park.

== History ==
Haggerston was first mentioned in sources in 1311, when Edward II visited Haggerston Castle, and again in 1345, when the castle was described as a 'strong tower' and was granted a licence to crenellate by Edward III in the same year. This licence is recorded in the Calendar of patent rolls (1343–45), p. 479.

The inhabitants of the castle, the de Hagardestons, are believed to have been part of the invading force of William the Conqueror, who invaded as far north as Berwick-upon-Tweed. The land at Haggerston was, at that time, boggy and wet, the remaining lake serving as a reminder of this. There are few records of the early part of the history of Haggerston Castle, as later fires destroyed much of the castle, along with its documents. It is known that John de Hagardeston inhabited the castle in the late 12th and early 13th century, his death having been documented circa 1210. He married into the Manners family, of Cheswick. The name of de Hagardeston appears to have changed to the anglicised spelling of Haggerston with Thomas Haggerston, born circa 1458.

In 1642, Sir Thomas Haggerston was created the first baronet of Haggerston, in the Baronetage of England. The Haggerstons married into many great families, such as the Cheswick family, gaining large amounts of land, but Haggerston eventually became a minor estate, connected to the Maxwell and Constable families, and passed to the Maxwell Lord Herries of Terregles, through Winifred Maxwell, who married William Haggerston-Constable, second son of the third Baronet. Their grandson, William Constable-Maxwell, became the 10th Lord Herries of Terregles when the title was restored in 1858.

=== C.J. Naylor ===
By the 1880s, the castle and estates were part of the Leyland Entailed Estates, built up by Liverpool banker Thomas Naylor. On his death in 1891, it was inherited by his nephew Christopher John Naylor (1849–1926), who gave up his family home Leighton Hall, Powys to his brother, and moved to Haggerston, changing his name to C.J. Leyland.

By 1893 he had rebuilt the main house, and like his father John Naylor started to develop his own gardens at Haggerston, overseeing the landscaping of the 23,000 acres (9,300 ha) estate. His brother John sent him six Cupressocyparis leylandii, a hybrid tree which had cross pollinated naturally at Leighton Hall in 1888 when the female flowers or cones of Nootka Cypress were fertilised by pollen from Monterey Cypress Naylor also laid out a 1.4 acres (0.6 ha) Italian garden.

Unfortunately, the castle is supposedly according to local legend subject to a witch's curse, which has resulted in the castle being damaged by fire on three occasions. The original reason for the curse and the resultant first fire are unknown, but the subsequent fires took place in 1618 and 1911. The fire resulted in only the tower remaining, and due to World War I Leyland never lived in the house again.

=== Today ===
After C.J. Naylor's death in 1926, in 1933, the ruins of the house were demolished and the estate auctioned off in 2,000 lots, to try to recoup some of the family fortune.

Only the tower and the rotunda (both Grade II listed buildings) remain of the house C.J. Naylor built on the castle site in 1893. Haven Holidays now owns these buildings and operates a holiday park on surrounding 256 acres (104 ha) of land, with the main complex for the caravan park stretches between these buildings to resemble a large tent. The tower is used as a storeroom, and the rotunda is the Owner's Exclusive lounge. The cellars have been converted into a bar and storerooms.

Seven semi-detached cottages, the "Roadside Cottages", still remain, and are privately owned, having been built for the employees of the castle in the late 18th century, along with a terrace of four cottages, the "Flower Cottages". There is also a modern-built house. The ruins of the chapel and the ice house still remain, along with the dovecote on the opposite side the A1.

== Governance ==
Haggerston is in the parliamentary constituency of Berwick-upon-Tweed.

== Economy ==
In 1925, a firm of commercial nurserymen specialising in conifers were looking for a breed that was fast growing, and could be deployed in hard to grow windy and salty areas such as Cornwall. Eventually they found the six original trees developed by Leyland, and began propagating the species, calling them Haggerston Grey in respect to their origins. In 1953, a freak tornado blew down one of the original trees at Haggerston (the other original five trees still survive), on which the research division of the Forestry Commission started developing additional hybrids. Commercial nurseries spotted the now termed Leylandii's potential, and for many years it was the biggest-selling item in every garden centre in Great Britain, making up to 10% of their total sales.

== See also ==
- Haggerston Castle
