= Broomhouse =

Broomhouse may refer to:

- Broomhouse, Edinburgh, a housing estate in the western part of Scotland's capital city
- Broomhouse, Glasgow, a residential suburb in the south-eastern part of Scotland's largest city
- Broomhouse (alternatively Broom House), a former country estate near Duns, Scottish Borders
- Broomhouse Farm, near Haggerston, Northumberland
