= Haggerston Castle =

Castle in Northumberland, England

Haggerston castle (heights)
- Northumberland, England
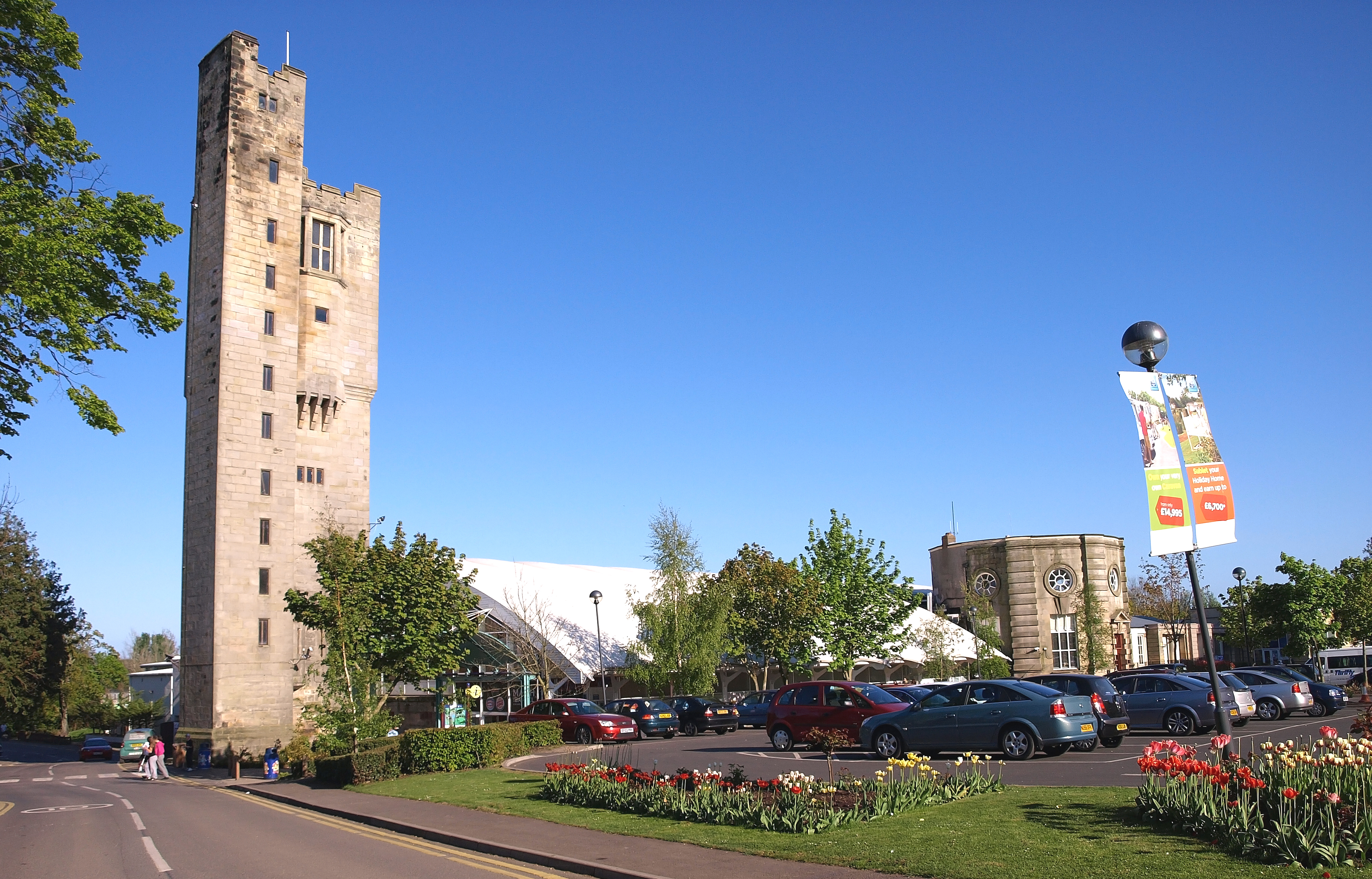
- Haggerston Castle showing tower and Rotunda

Location
- Location in Northumberland
- Coordinates: 55.687°N 1.935°W
- Grid reference: NU042436

Haggerston Castle was a castle located in the county of Northumberland, England at Haggerston about 5 miles (8 km) south of Berwick-upon-Tweed. Only the tower, rotunda and stable block (Grade II listed buildings) remain. Today it is part of a caravan park owned by Haven Holidays.

== History ==
Haggerston Castle was first mentioned in sources in 1311 when Edward II visited the castle and again in 1345, when it was described as a 'strong tower' and was granted a licence to crenellate by Edward III. This licence is recorded in the Calendar of patent rolls (1343–45),

The inhabitants of the castle, the de Hagardestons, are believed to have been part of the 11th century invading force of William the Conqueror, which penetrated as far north as Berwick-upon-Tweed. The land at Haggerston was then boggy and wet, the remaining lake a remnant of that time. There are few records of the early history of Haggerston Castle as fires have destroyed much of the castle with its documents. It is known that John de Hagardeston inhabited the castle in the late 12th and early 13th century, his death having been documented as circa 1210. He married into the Manners family of Cheswick, Northumberland. The name de Hagardeston appears to have been changed to the anglicised spelling of Haggerston with Thomas Haggerston, born circa 1458.

In 1642 Sir Thomas Haggerston was created the first baronet of Haggerston in the Baronetage of England. The Haggerstons married into many great families such as the Cheswick family, gaining large amounts of land. In 1785 Haggerston was in the ownership of Sir Carnaby Haggerston who married Francis Smyth, and their daughter Mary, in 1805 married Sir Thomas-Massey Stanley of Hooton Hall in Cheshire, to whom the ownership of Haggerston Castle devolved. The Baronetcy passed to Sir Carnaby's nephew, Thomas Haggeston of Sandoe and Ellingham, Northumberland. Sir William Thomas Stanley-Massey-Stanley, 10th Baronet (1806–1863) of Hooton amassed considerable gambling debts and c.1839 both Hooton Hall and Haggerston Castle came into the ownership of the Naylor/Leyland family.

=== C. J. Naylor ===
By the 1880s the castle and estates were part of the Leyland Entailed Estates, built up by Liverpool banker Thomas Naylor. On his death in 1891 it was inherited by his nephew Christopher John Naylor (1849–1926), who gave up his family home, Leighton Hall, Powys, to his brother and moved to Haggerston—changing his name to C.J. Leyland.

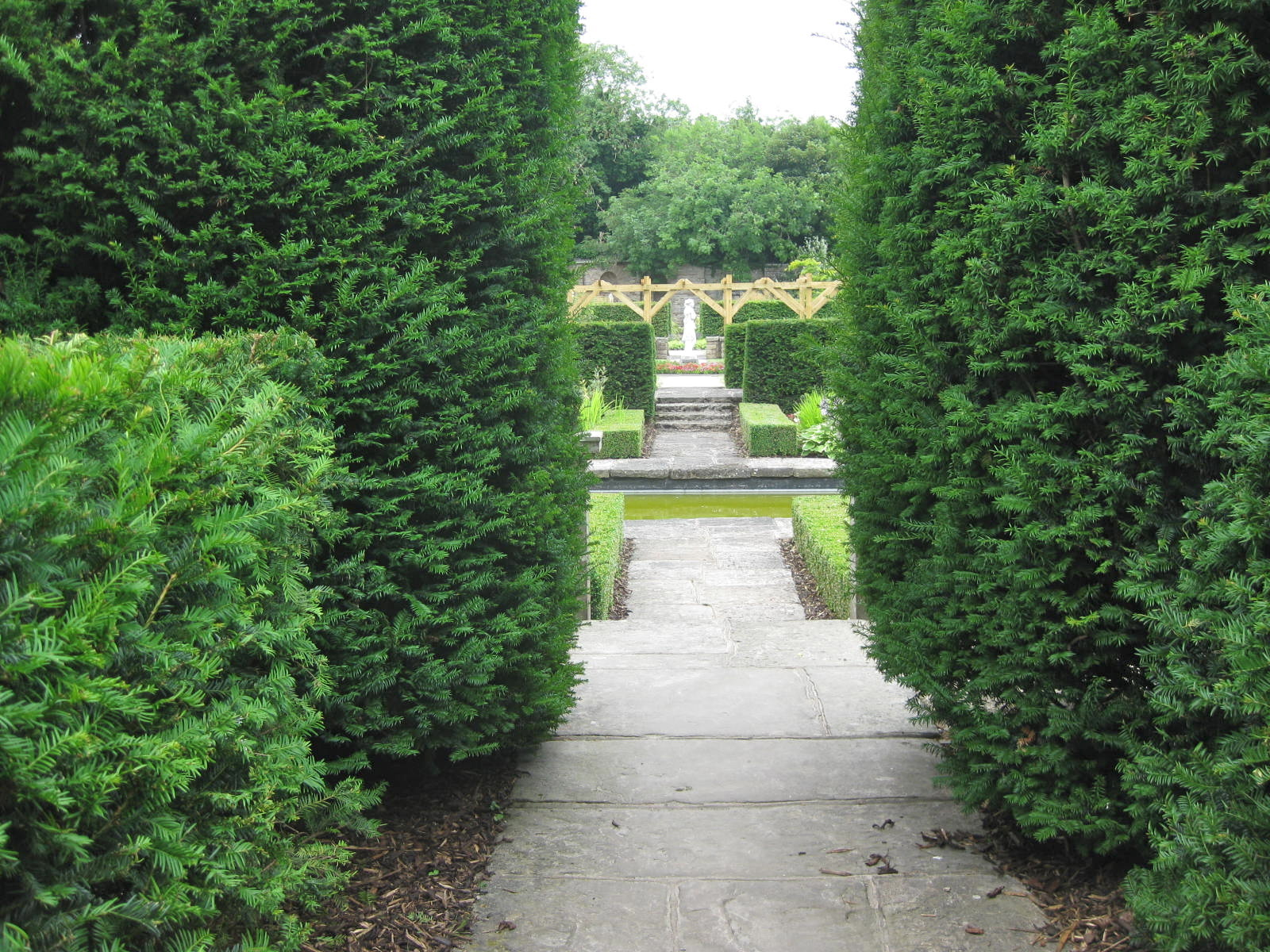
Italian Garden at Haggerston Castle

By 1893 Leyland had rebuilt the main house and had begun developing his own gardens at Haggerston, overseeing the landscaping of the 23,000 acres (9,300 ha) estate. Naylor also laid out a 1.4 acres (0.6 ha) Italian garden.

According to local legend the castle was cursed by a witch—leading supposedly to destructive fires on three occasions. The reason for the curse and the year of the first fire are now unknown, but there were subsequent fires in 1618 and in 1911. The last fire left only the tower and rotunda, and Leyland did not live again in the house he built in 1893.

=== Today ===
C.J. Leyland (né Naylor) died in 1926; in 1933, attempting to recoup some of the family fortune, the ruins of the house he built were demolished and the estate was auctioned off in 2,000 lots. Only the tower and the rotunda (both Grade II listed buildings) remain of the castle. Haven Holidays now owns these structures and operates a holiday park on surrounding 256 acres (104 ha) of land. The main complex of the caravan park, resembling a large tent, stretches between these structures. The tower is used as a storeroom and the rotunda is the Activities and Leisure Fun-zone. The cellars were converted into a bar and storerooms. But now due to health and safety reasons and a lack of fire escapes due to the development of the sports facilities the cellar bar named as "The Tavern" had to be closed.

Seven semi-detached cottages, the "Roadside Cottages", remain and are privately owned. They and a terrace of four cottages, the "Flower Cottages", were built for employees of the castle in the late 18th century. The ruins of the chapel and the ice house remain, along with the dovecote on the opposite side the A1.

== Leylandii and Haggerston Castle ==
While developing the gardens and landscaping at Haggeston, Christopher Leyland was sent by his brother John, six Cupressocyparis × leylandii, a hybrid tree that was the result of spontaneous cross-pollination at Leighton Hall in 1888 when the female flowers or cones of Nootka cypress (Cupressus nootkatensis) were fertilised by pollen from Monterey cypress (Cupressus macrocarpa). In 1925 a firm of commercial nurserymen specialising in conifers were looking for a particular breed; one that was fast growing and could be deployed in hard-to-grow windy and salty areas such as Cornwall. Eventually they found the six original trees developed by Leyland and began propagating the species, calling them "Haggerston Grey" in respect to their origins. In 1953 a freak tornado blew down one of the original trees; subsequently the Forestry Commission started developing hybrids from the five survivors. Commercial nurseries spotted the potential of the now termed "Leylandii", and it was one of the biggest-selling items in garden centres in Great Britain in the late 20th century.

== Literature ==
- Jackson, Michael. (1992) Castles of Northumbria. Barmkin Books. ISBN 978-0-9519708-0-5
- Pevsner N et al., Buildings of England: Northumberland, 2nd edition, Penguin, 1992/Yale U.P. 2002.
- Saint, Andrew, Richard Norman Shaw . Yale Univ. Press 2nd Edition, 2010. ISBN 9780300155266
- Lamb, Jocelyn. The Haggerston Historical Handbook, Brownlamb Publications, 2000

== Haggerston Castle Gallery ==
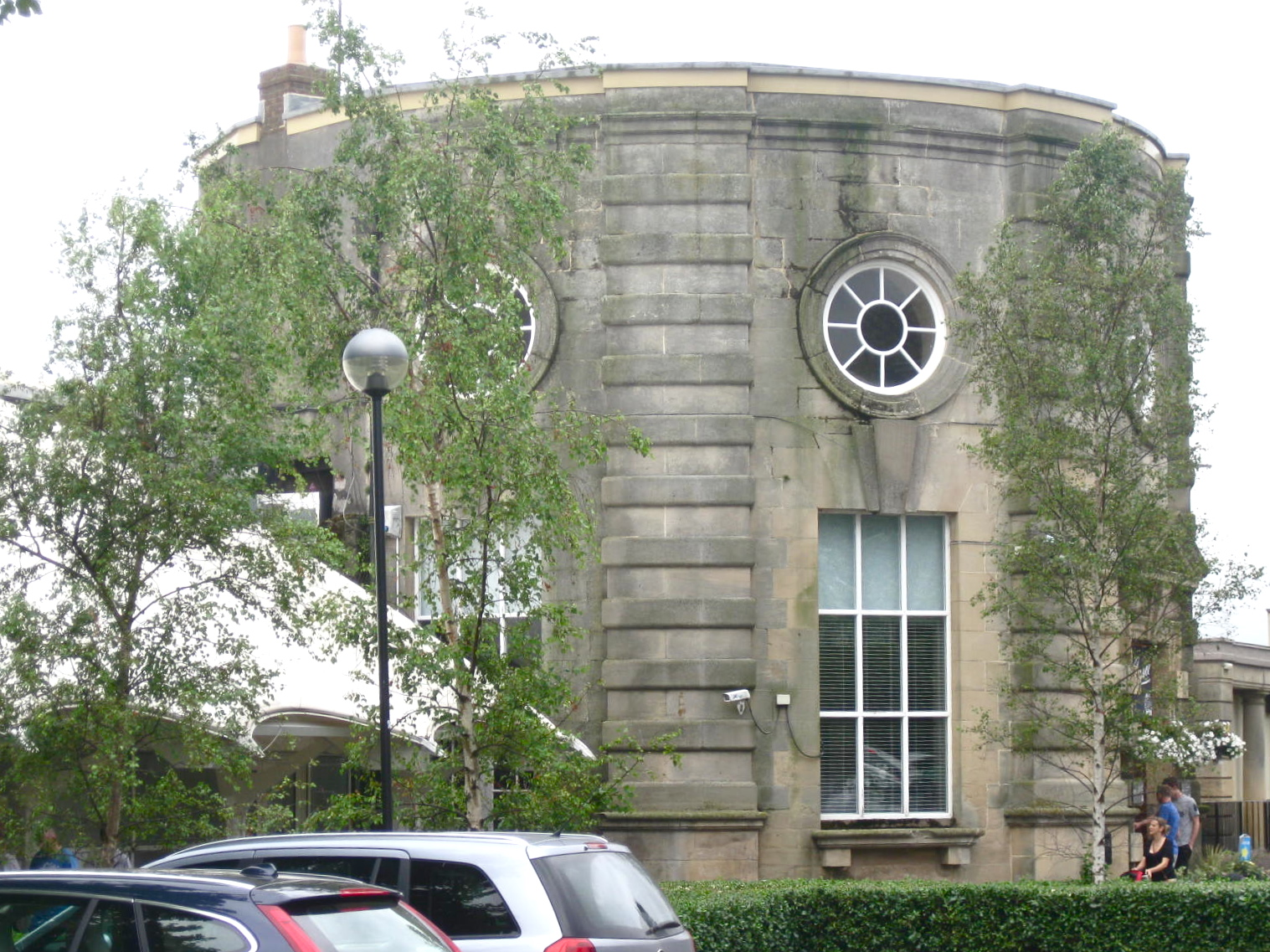
Haggerston Castle, The Rotunda

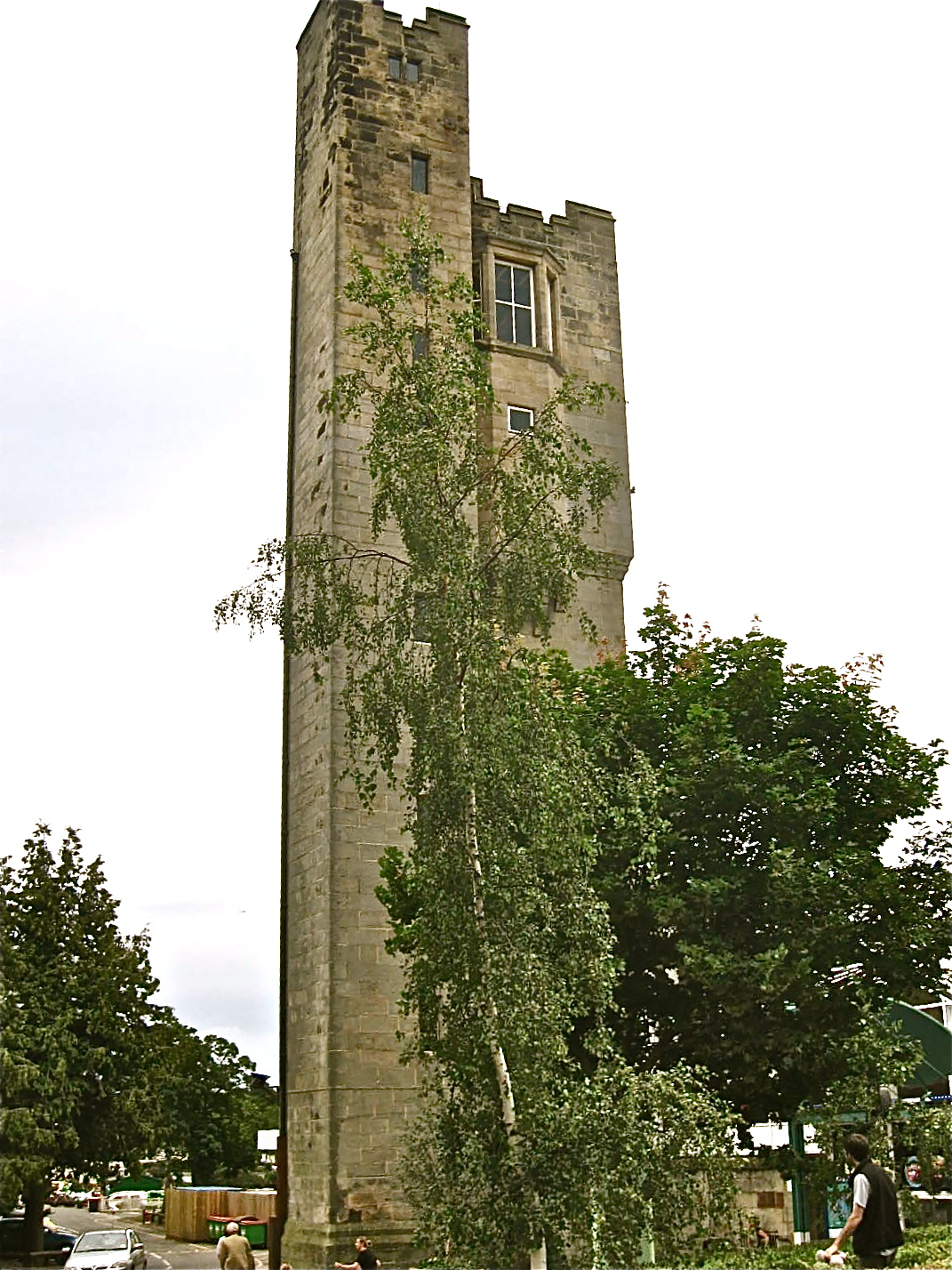
Haggerston Castle. Watertower and Belvedere

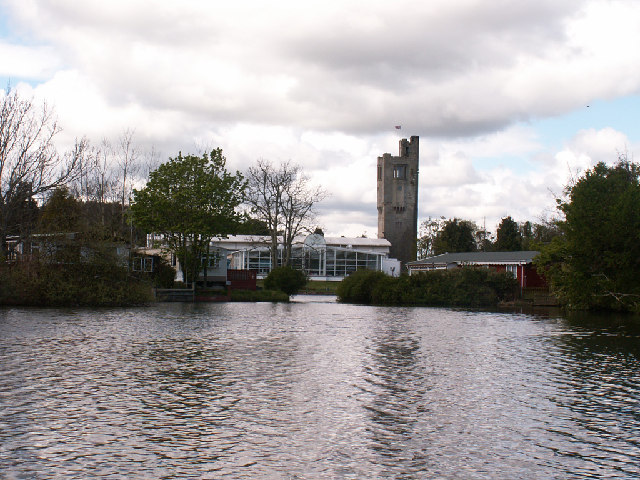
Haggerston Castle from boating lake

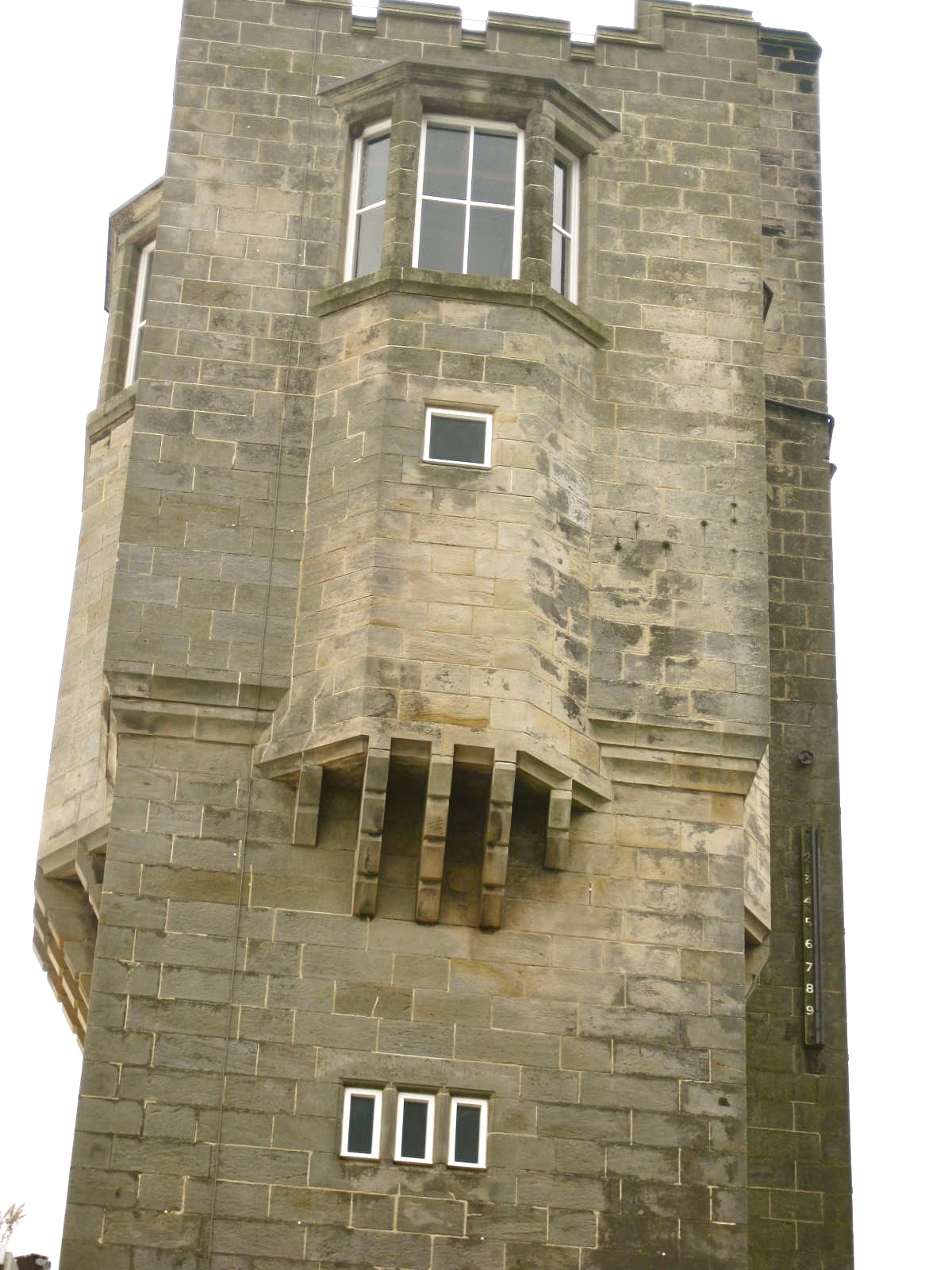
Haggerston Castle

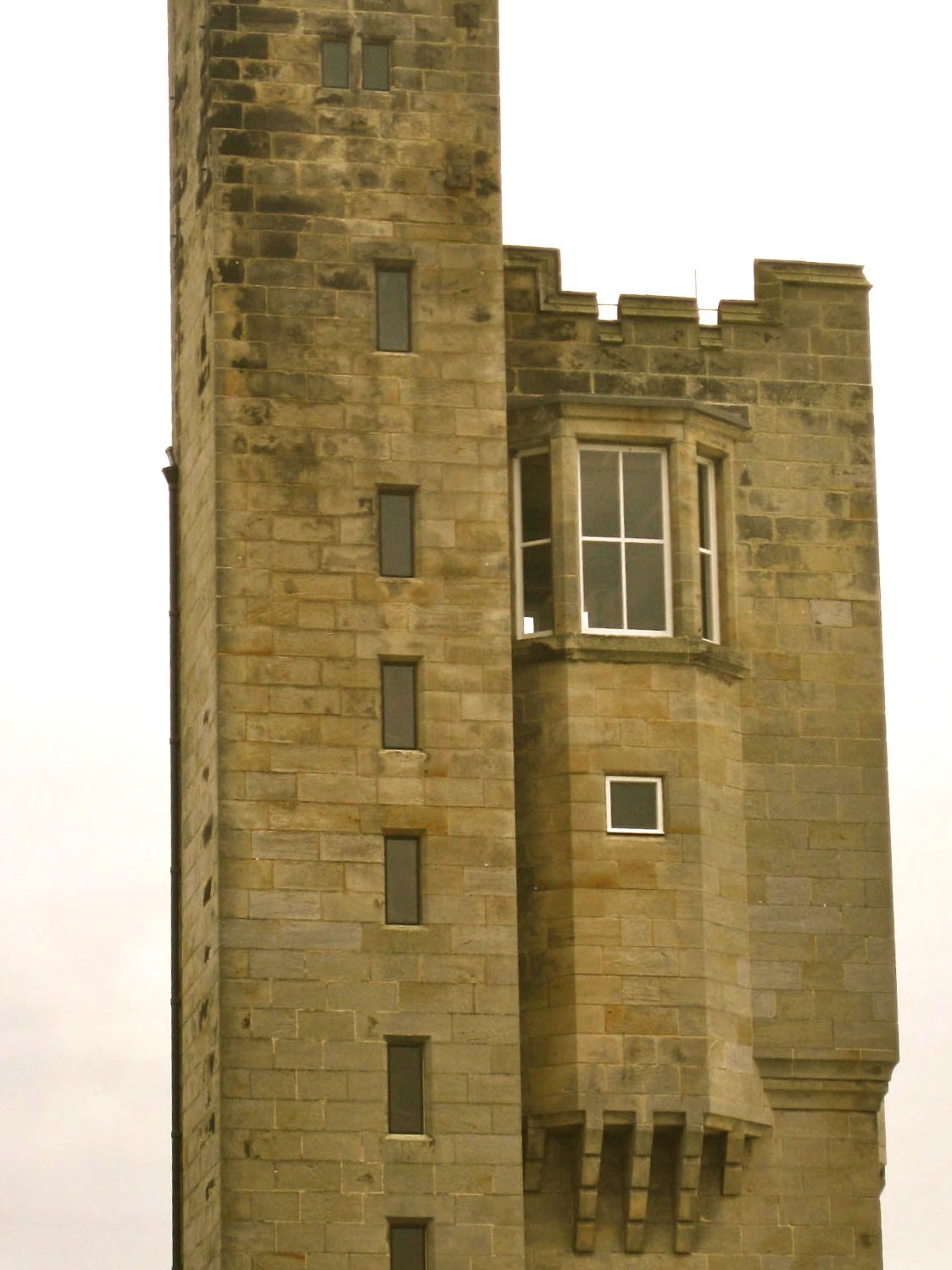
Haggerston Castle, Watertower and Belvedere

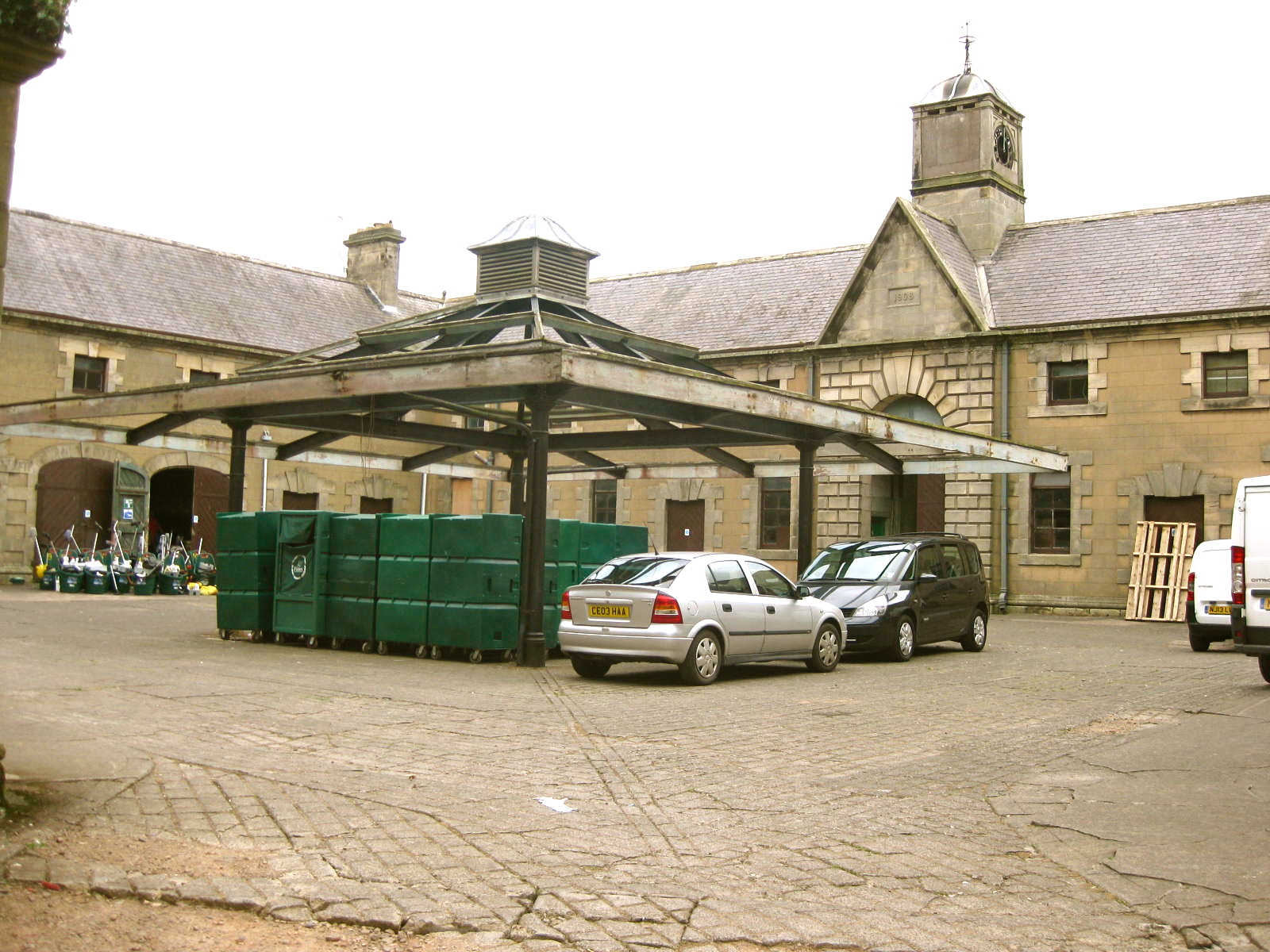
Haggerston Castle. Interior of Stable Block

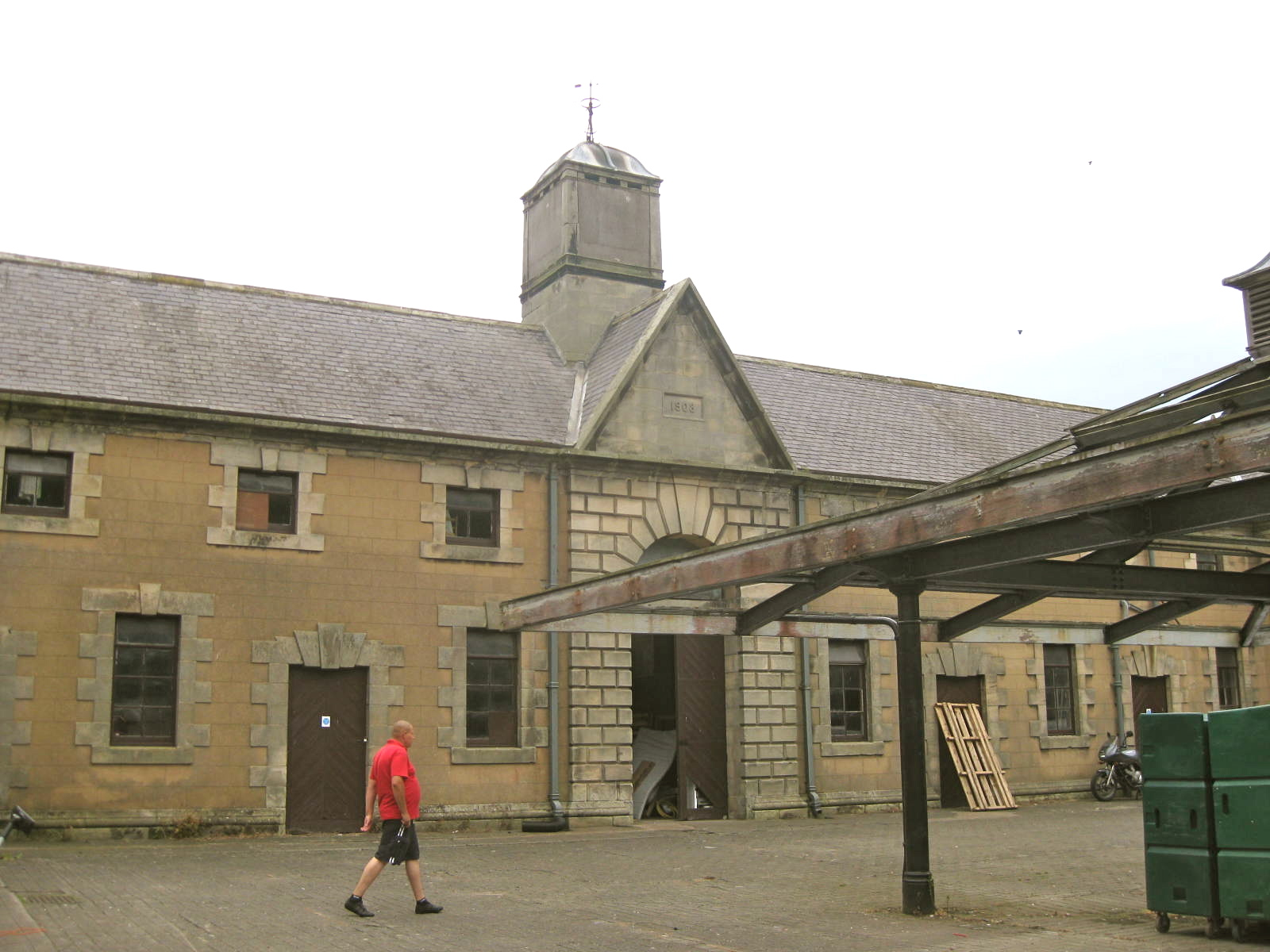
Haggerston Castle. Interior of Stable Block 1908

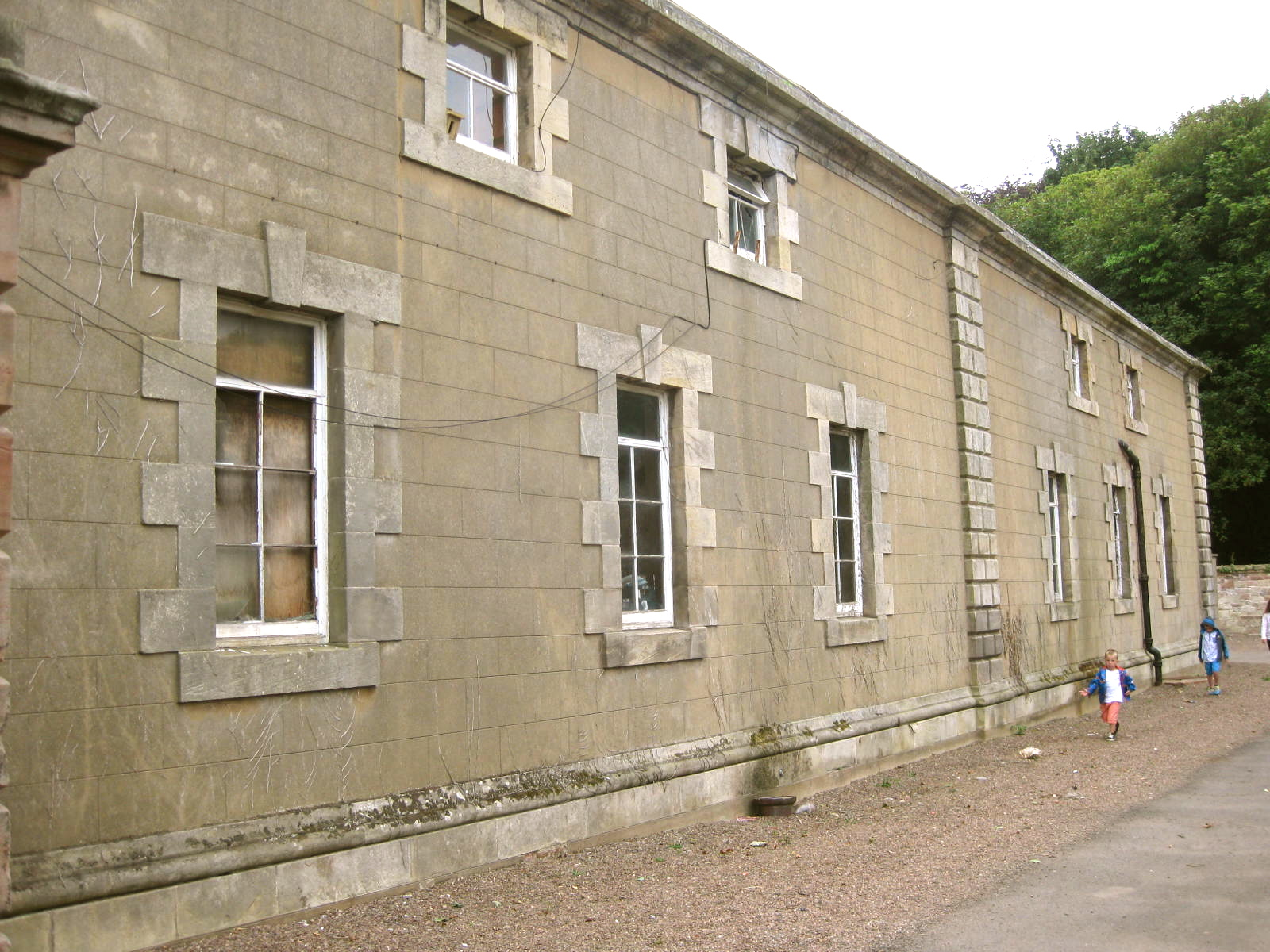
Haggerston Castle, N facade of Stable Block 1908

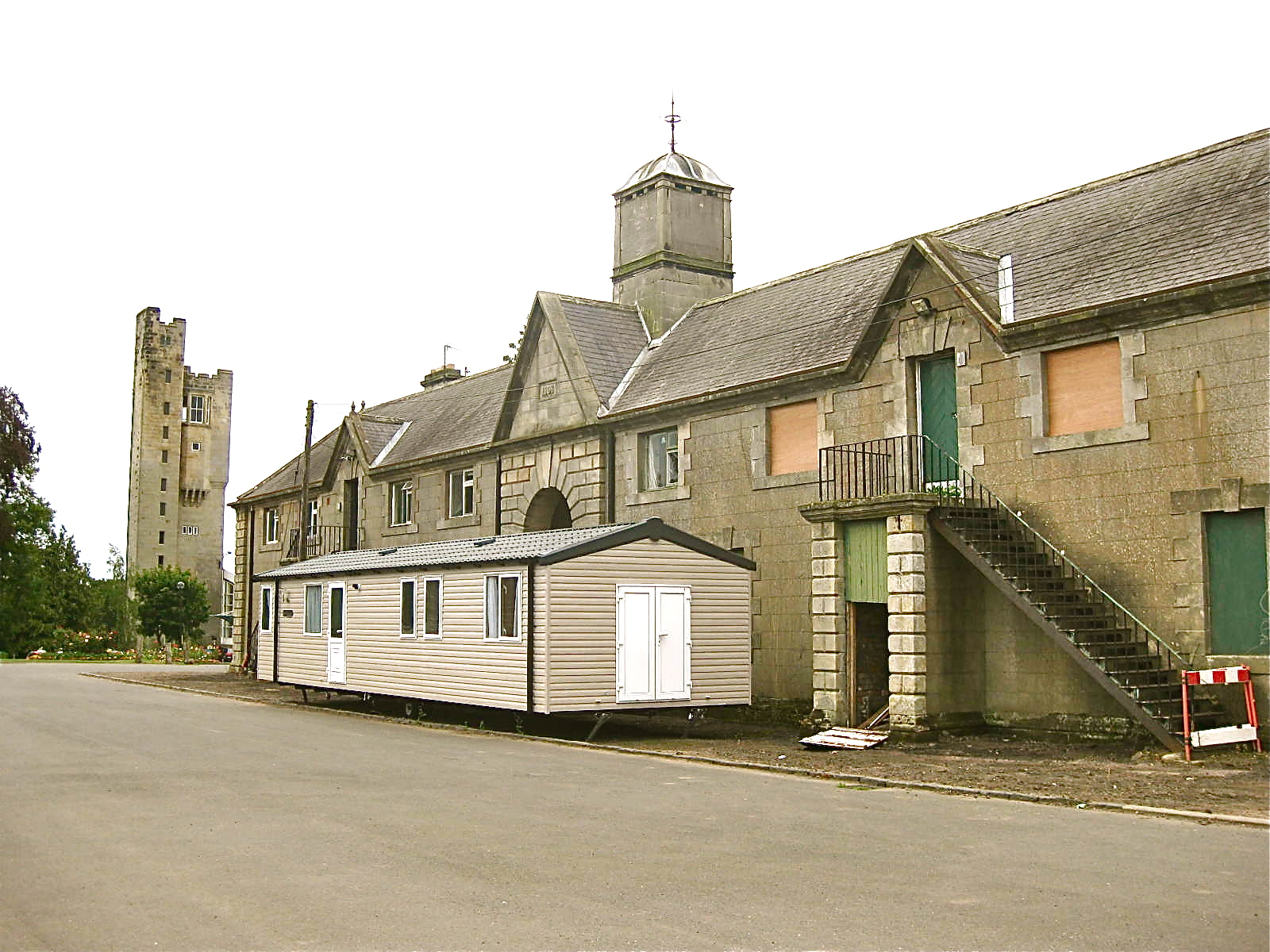
Haggerston Castle. Stable block with tower in distance

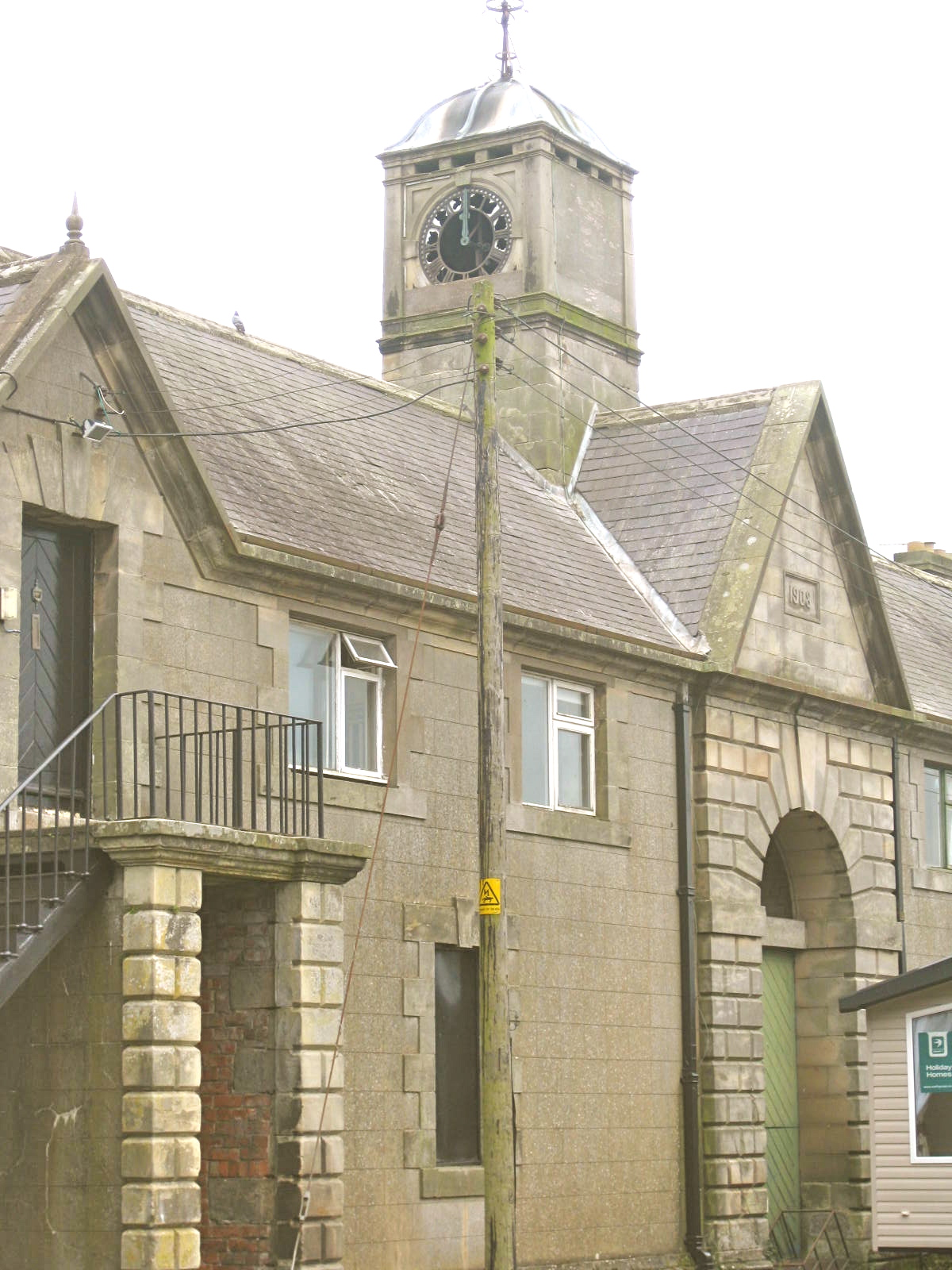
Haggerston Castle. Stable Block with clock tower.

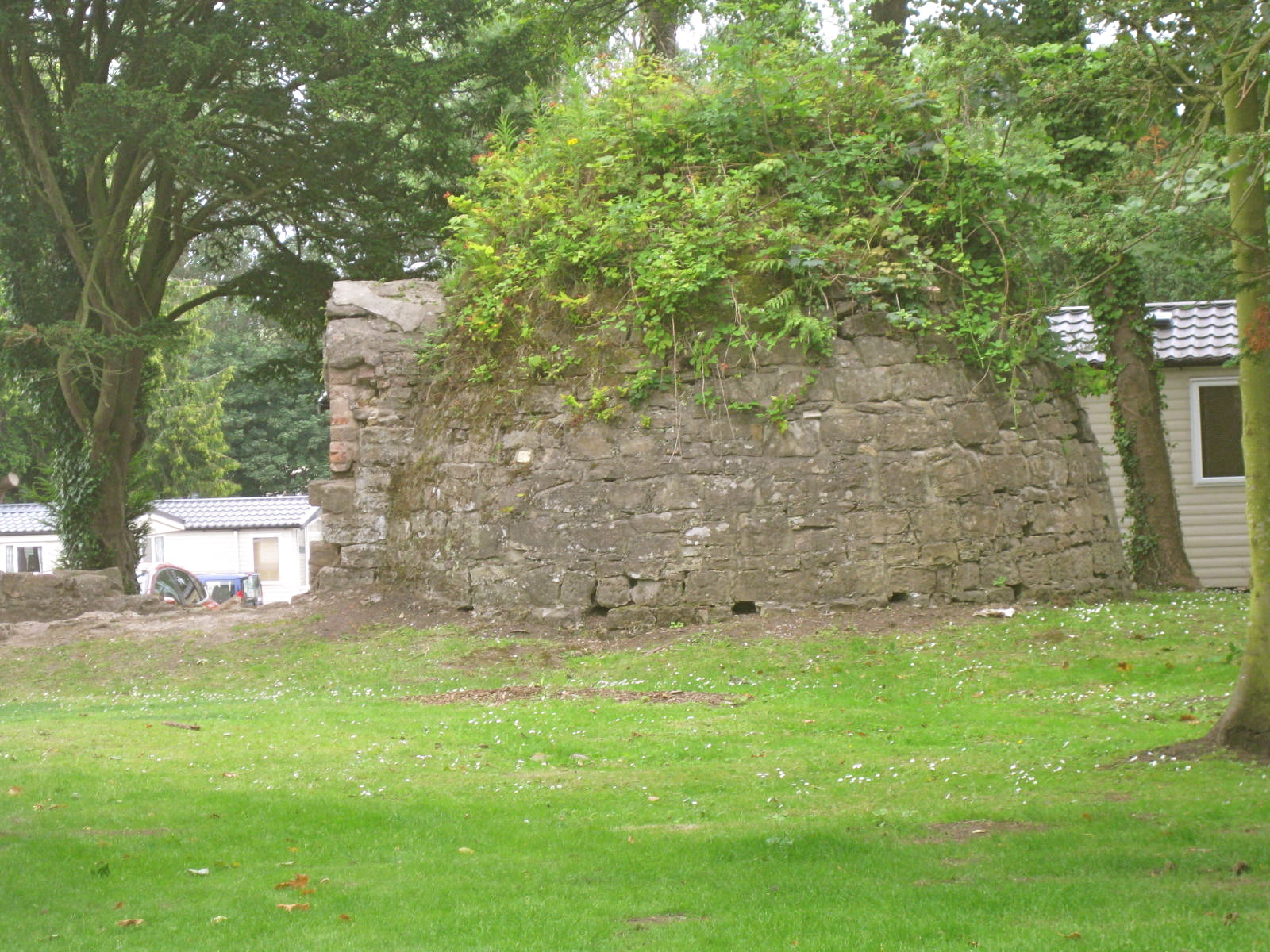
Haggerston Castle. ?Medieval wall possibly of castle

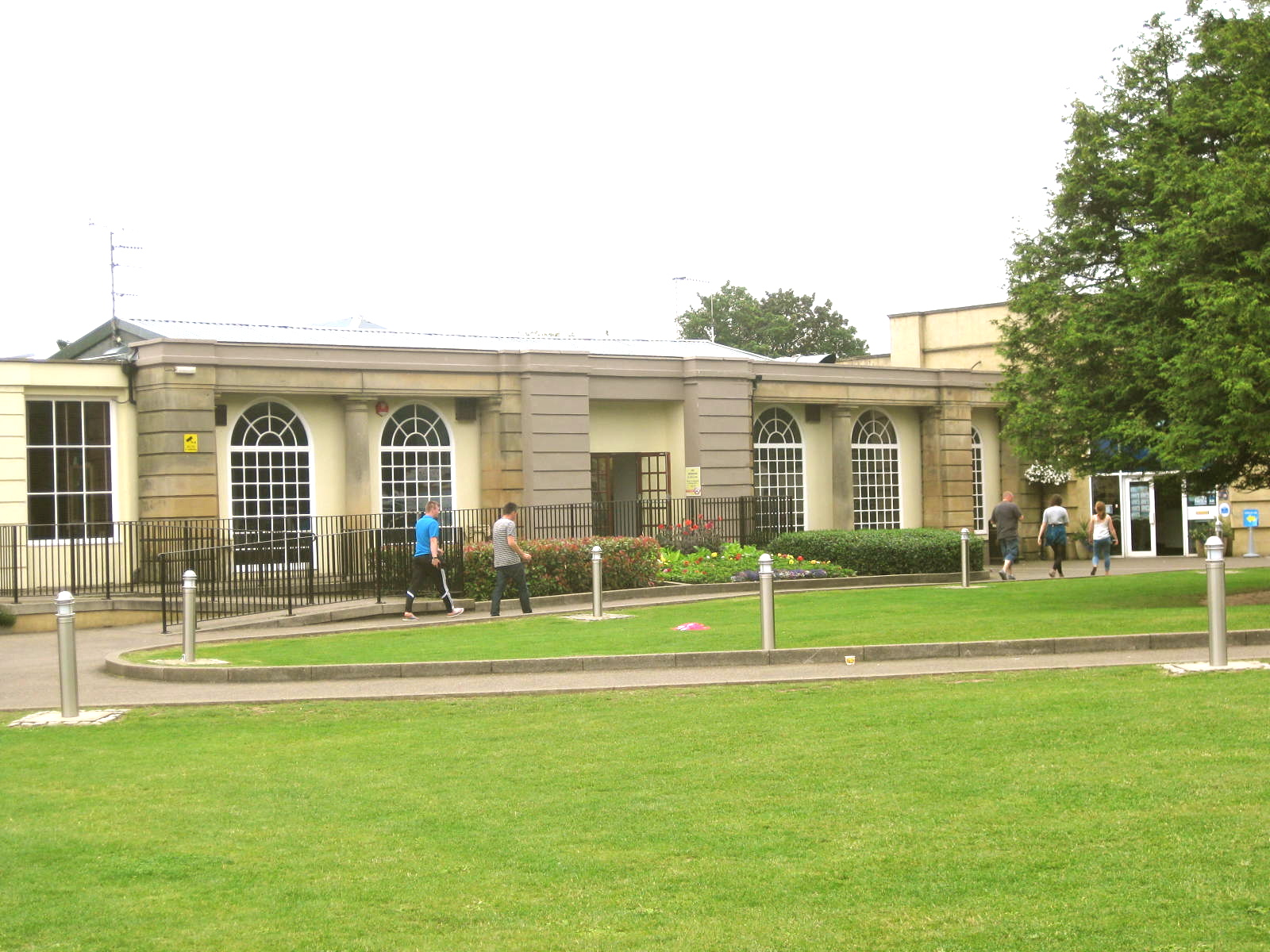
Haggerston Castle. Facade adjacent to rotunda

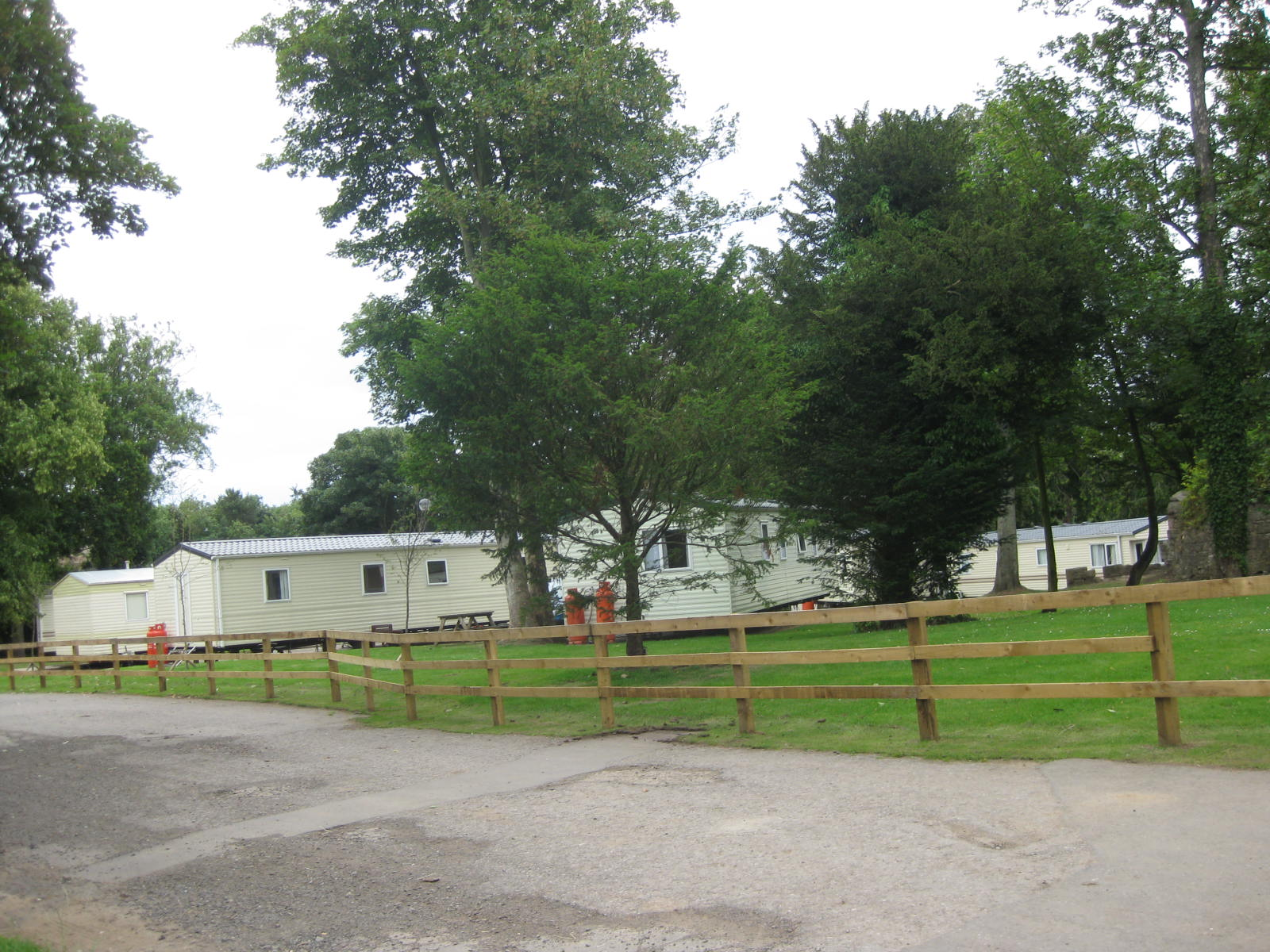
Haggerston Castle. Caravans
