= Constable baronets =

Extinct baronetcy in the Baronetage of England

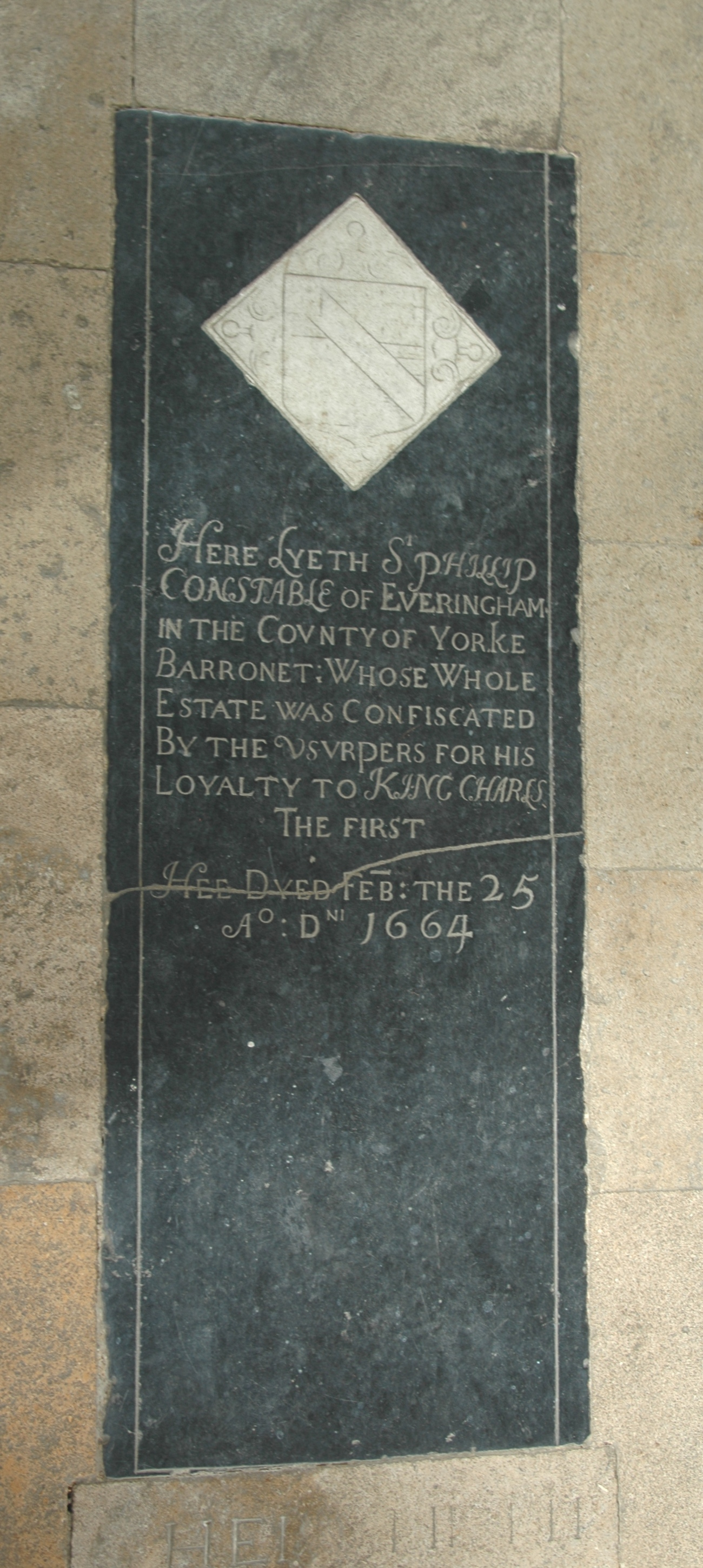
Tombstone at St Mary's parish church, Steeple Barton, Oxfordshire, of Sir Philip Constable, 1st Baronet

There have been two baronetcies created for persons with the surname Constable, both in the Baronetage of England. Both titles are extinct.

The Constable baronetcy, of Flamborough in the County of York, was created in the Baronetage of England on 29 June 1611 for William Constable. The title became extinct on his death on 15 June 1655.

The Constable baronetcy, of Everingham in the County of York, was created in the Baronetage of England on 20 July 1642 for Philip Constable. The title became extinct on the death of the fourth Baronet in July 1746. The Constable estates were inherited by the late Baronet's great-nephew, William Haggerston, who assumed the additional surname of Constable. For further history of this branch of the family, see Constable Maxwell-Scott baronets.

== Constable baronets, of Flamborough (1611) ==
- Sir William Constable, 1st Baronet (circa 1580 – 1655)

== Constable baronets, of Everingham (1642) ==
- Sir Philip Constable, 1st Baronet (c. 1595 – 1664)
- Sir Marmaduke Constable, 2nd Baronet (1619 – c. 1680)
- Sir Philip Mark Constable, 3rd Baronet (1651 – c. 1710)
- Sir Marmaduke Constable, 4th Baronet (1682 – 1746)

== See also ==
- Clifford-Constable baronets
- Constable Maxwell-Scott baronets

Baronetage of England
Preceded by Belasyse baronets	Constable baronets 29 June 1611	Succeeded by Leigh baronets
