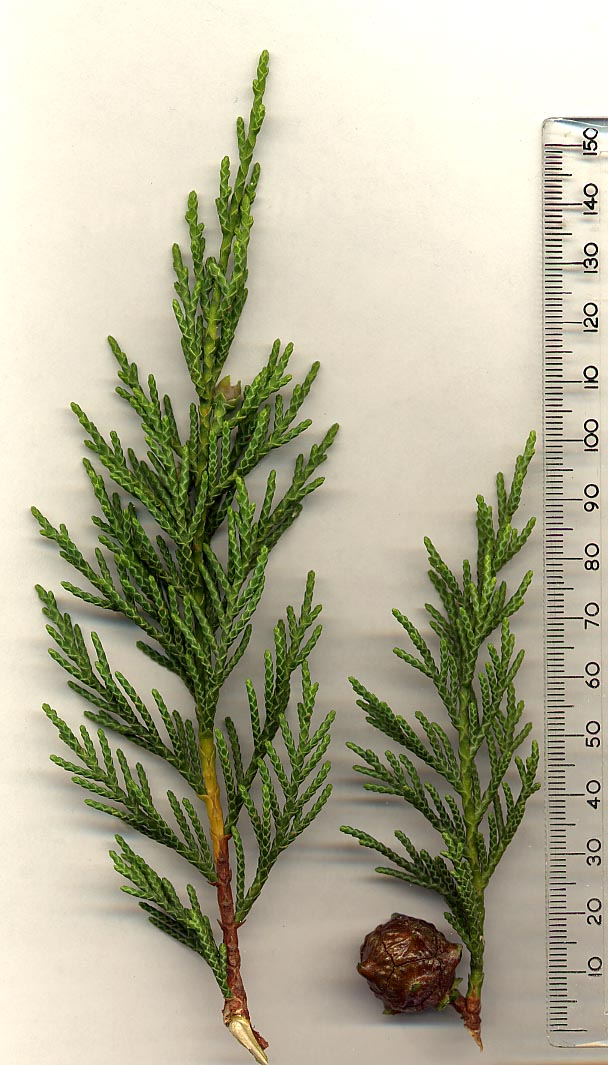
- Leyland cypress foliage and cone

Scientific classification
- Kingdom: Plantae
- Clade: Tracheophytes
- Clade: Gymnosperms
- Division: Pinophyta
- Class: Pinopsida
- Order: Cupressales
- Family: Cupressaceae
- Genus: Cupressus
- Species: C. × leylandii

Binomial name
- Cupressus × leylandii A. B. Jacks. & Dallim.

Synonyms
- ×Cuprocyparis leylandii (A. B. Jacks. & Dallim.) Farjon; ×Cupressocyparis leylandii (A. B. Jacks. & Dallim.) Dallim.; Callitropsis × leylandii (A. B. Jacks. & Dallim.) D.P. Little; ×Hesperotropsis leylandii (A. B. Jacks. & Dallim.) Garland & Gerry Moore

= Leyland cypress =

Species of conifer

The Leyland cypress, Cupressus × leylandii, × Cuprocyparis leylandii or × Cupressocyparis leylandii, often referred to simply as leylandii, is a fast-growing coniferous tree much used in horticulture, primarily for hedges and screens. Even on sites of relatively poor culture, plants have been known to grow to heights of 15 metres (49 ft) in 16 years. Their rapid, thick growth means they are sometimes used to achieve privacy, but such use can result in disputes with neighbours whose own property becomes overshadowed. The tree is a hybrid of Monterey cypress (Cupressus macrocarpa) and Nootka cypress (Cupressus nootkatensis). It is almost always sterile, and is propagated mainly by cuttings.

== History ==
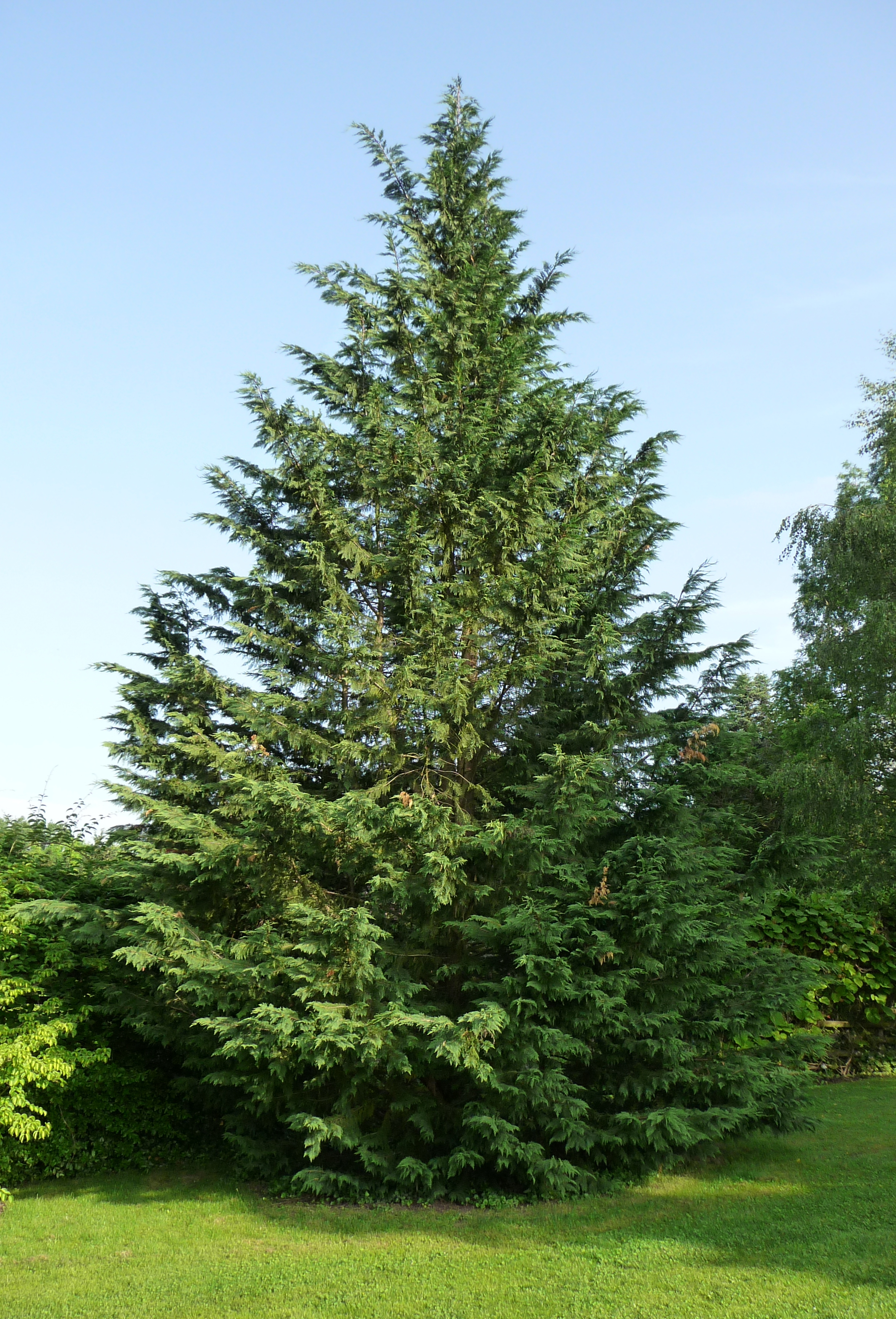
Habit.

In 1845, the Leighton Hall, Powys estate was purchased by the Liverpool banker Christopher Leyland. In 1847, he gave it to his nephew John Naylor (1813–1889). Naylor commissioned Edward Kemp to lay out the gardens, which included redwoods, monkey puzzle trees and two North American species of conifers in close proximity to each other – Monterey cypress and Nootka cypress. The two parent species would not likely cross in the wild, as their natural ranges are more than 400 miles (640 km) apart, but in 1888, the hybrid cross occurred when the female flowers or cones of Nootka cypress were fertilised by pollen from Monterey cypress.

John Naylor's eldest son Christopher John (1849–1926) inherited Leighton Hall from his father in 1889. Christopher was a sea captain by trade. In 1891, he inherited the Leyland Entailed Estates established under the will of his great-great-uncle, which passed to him following the death of his uncle Thomas Leyland. On receiving the inheritance, Christopher changed his surname to Leyland, and moved to Haggerston Castle, Northumberland. He further developed the hybrid at his new home, and hence named the first clone variant 'Haggerston Grey'. His younger brother John (1856–1906) resultantly inherited Leighton Hall, and when in 1911 the reverse hybrid of the cones of the Monterey cypress were fertilised with pollen from the Nootka, that hybrid was baptised 'Leighton Green.'

The hybrid has since arisen on nearly 20 separate occasions, always by open pollination, showing the two species are readily compatible and closely related. As a hybrid, although fertility of certain Leyland cypress forms were recently reported, most Leyland cypress were thought to be sterile, and nearly all the trees now seen have resulted from cuttings originating from those few plants. Over 40 forms of Leyland cypress are known, and as well as 'Haggerston Grey' and 'Leighton Green', other well-known forms include 'Stapehill', which was discovered in 1940 in a garden in Ferndown, Dorset by M. Barthelemy and 'Castlewellan', which originated from a single mutant tree in the Castlewellan estate arboretum in Northern Ireland. This form, widely propagated from the 1970s, was selected by the park director, John Keown, and was named Cupressus macrocarpa 'Keownii', 1963.

== Description ==
A large coniferous tree, Cupressus × leylandii reaches a size between 20 and 25 m high, with its leaves giving it a compact, thick and regular habit. It grows very fast with yearly increases of 1 m. The leaves, about 1 mm long and close to the twig, are presented in flaky, slightly aromatic branches. They are dark green, somewhat paler on the underside, but can have different colors, depending on the cultivar. The crown of many forms is broadly columnar with slightly overhanging branch tips. The branches are slightly flattened and densely populated with scaly needles. The tree bark is dark red or brown and has deep grooves.

The seeds are found in cones about 2 cm in length, with eight scales and five seeds with tiny resinous vesicles. With the tree being a hybrid, its seeds are sterile. Over time, the cones shrink dry and turn gray or chocolate brown and then have a diameter of 1 cm.

== Taxonomic status ==
Parent species of the Leyland cypress

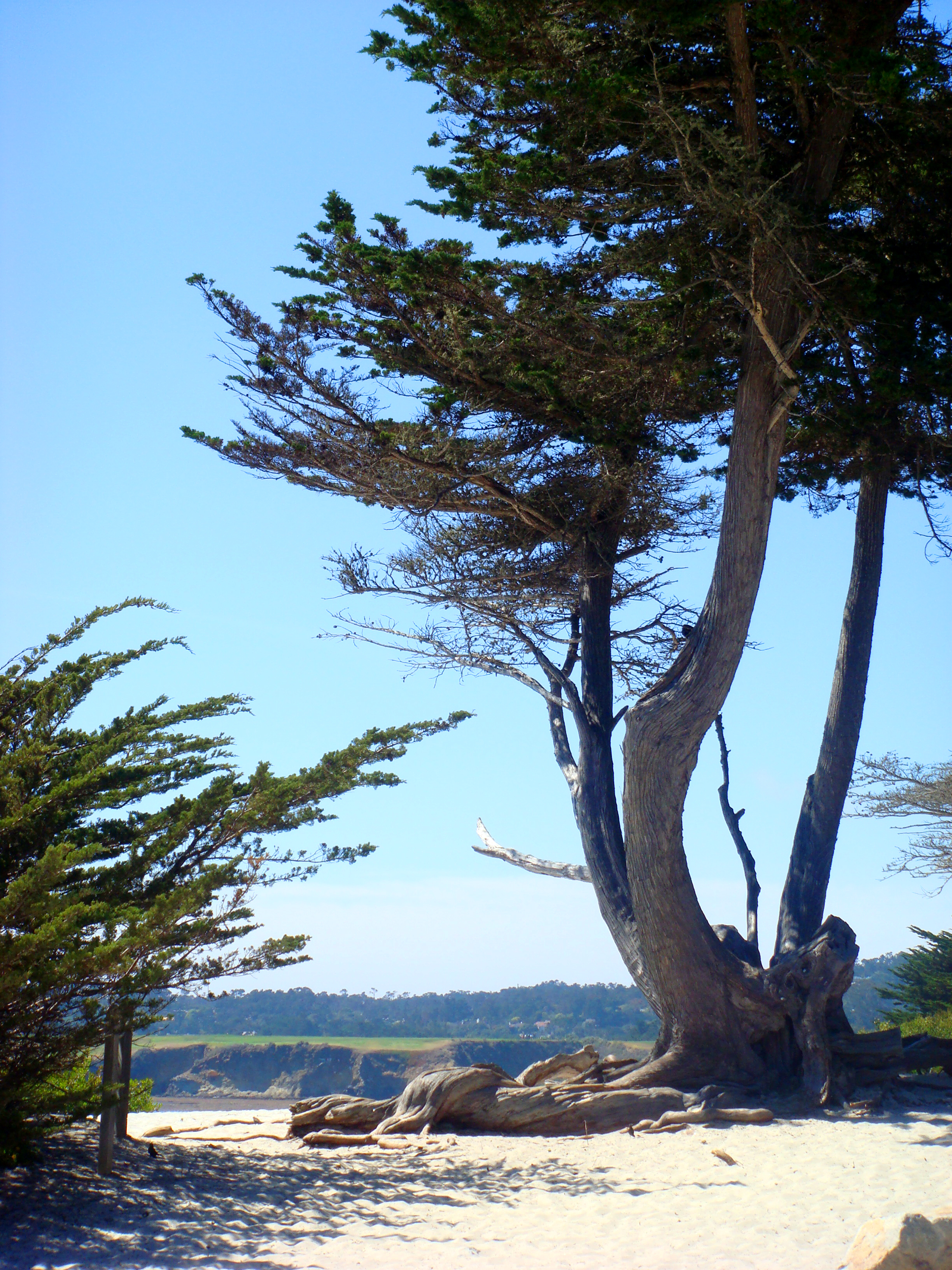
Monterey cypress, Cupressus macrocarpa

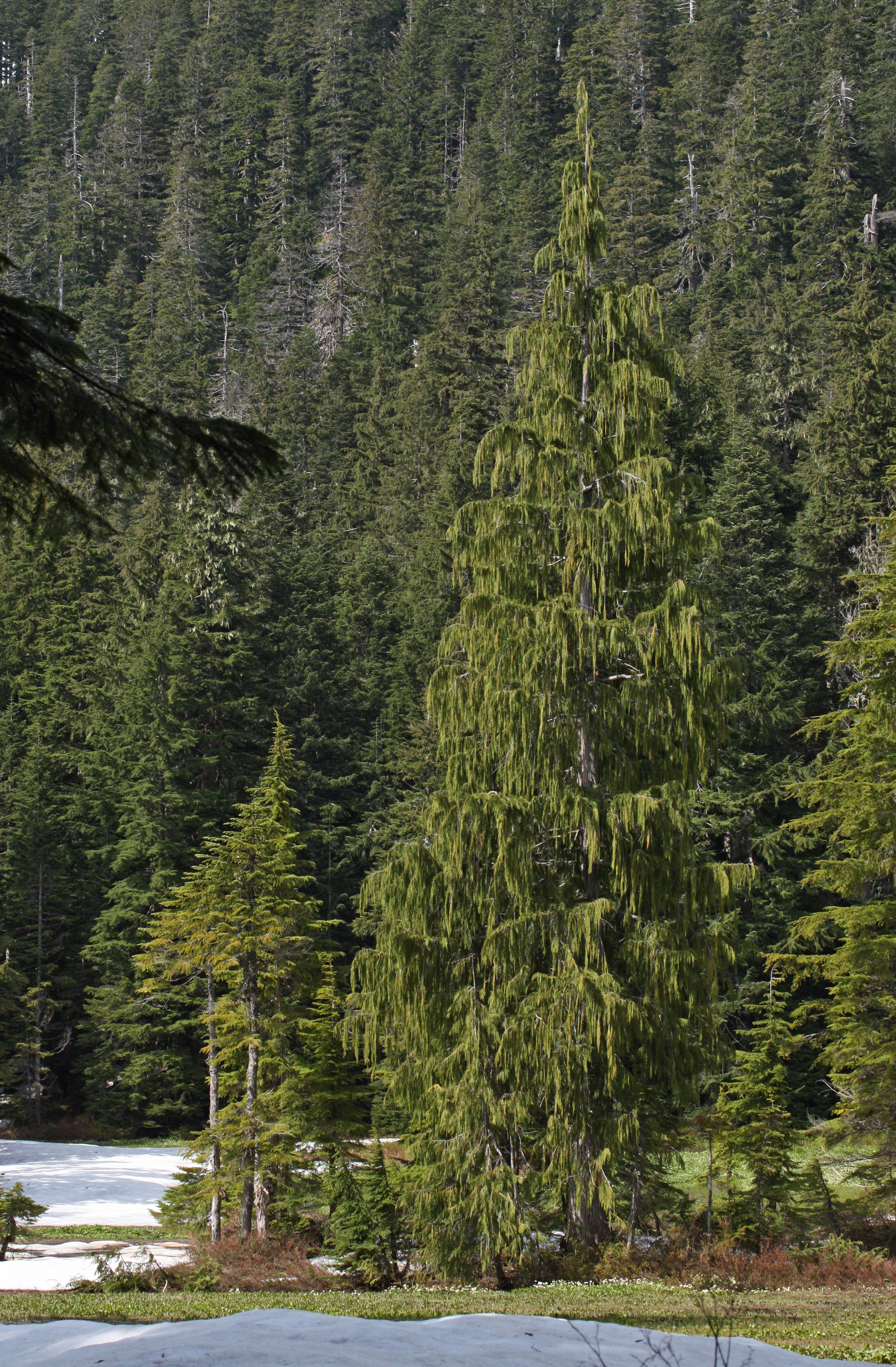
Nootka cypress, Cupressus nootkatensis

Cupressus × leylandii is a hybrid of two other cypress species: Monterey cypress (Cupressus macrocarpa) and Nootka cypress (Cupressus nootkatensis). The taxonomic status of Nootka cypress has changed over time, and this has affected the taxonomic status of the hybrid. Nootka cypress was first regarded as belonging in the genus Cupressus, but was later placed in Chamaecyparis. It has become clear, however, that when the genus Cupressus is defined to include Chamaecyparis, it is paraphyletic unless it also includes Juniperus. In 2004, Little et al. transferred the Nootka cypress to Callitropsis. Little (2006) proposed another alternative by transferring all the North American species of Cupressus, including the Monterey cypress (C. macrocarpa), to Callitropsis.

In some of these classifications, this and other hybrids of Nootka cypress become very unusual in being intergeneric hybrids, the only ones ever reported among the gymnosperms. In 2010, Mao et al. performed a more detailed molecular analysis and redefined Cupressus to exclude Chamaecyparis, but to include the Nootka cypress. It may be added that attempts to cross Nootka cypress with other Chamaecyparis species have been universally unsuccessful. The scientific name of Leyland cypress depends on the taxonomic treatment of Nootka cypress. Where Nootka cypress is considered as Cupressus nootkatensis, the hybrid is within the Cupressus genus and is therefore Cupressus × leylandii. If both Monterey and Nootka cypress are considered as species of Callitropsis, the hybrid is Callitropsis × leylandii. However where the parents are treated as being in different genera, Leyland cypress becomes an intergeneric hybrid: if Nootka cypress is within Chamaecyparis, the name of the hybrid becomes ×Cupressocyparis leylandii, and where it is treated as Xanthocyparis, the hybrid becomes ×Cuprocyparis leylandii.

Two other similar hybrids have also been raised, both involving Nootka cypress with other Cupressus species:

Cupressus arizonica var. glabra × Cupressus nootkatensis (Cupressus × notabilis)
Cupressus lusitanica × Cupressus nootkatensis (Cupressus × ovensii)

== Adaptation ==
Leyland cypress is light-demanding, but is tolerant of high levels of pollution and salt spray. A hardy, fast-growing natural hybrid, it thrives on a variety of soils, and sites are commonly planted in gardens to provide a quick boundary or shelter hedge, because of their rapid growth. Although widely used for screening, it has not been planted much for forestry purposes. In both forms of the hybrid, Leyland cypress combines the hardiness of the Nootka or Alaska cypress with the fast growth of the Monterey cypress.

The tallest Leyland cypress documented is about 40 m (130 ft) tall and still growing. However, because their roots are relatively shallow, a large leylandii tends to topple over. The shallow root structure also means that it is poorly adapted to areas with hot summers, such as the southern half of the United States. In these areas, it is prone to develop cypress canker disease, which is caused by the fungus Seiridium cardinale. Canker causes extensive dieback and ultimately kills the tree. In California's Central Valley, they rarely live more than 10 years before succumbing, and not much longer in southern states like Alabama. In these areas, the canker-resistant Arizona cypress is much more successful. In northern areas where heavy snows occur, this plant is also susceptible to broken branches and uprooting in wet, heavy snow. The tree has also been introduced in Kenya on parts of Mount Kenya.

The sap can cause skin irritation in susceptible individuals.

== Commercialization ==
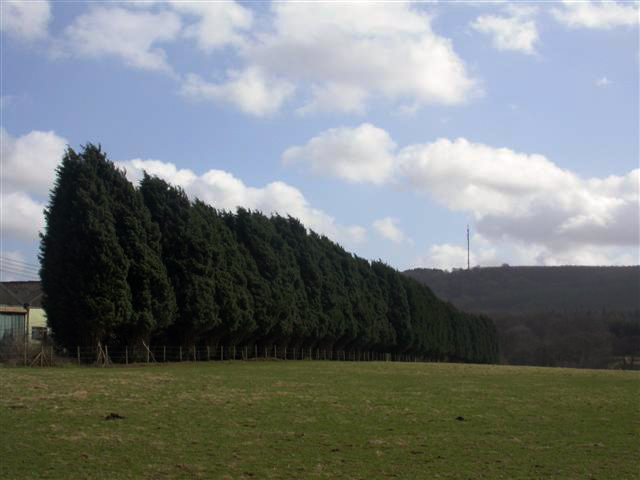
Leylandii used as windbreak

In 1925, a firm of commercial nurserymen specialising in conifers were looking for a breed that was fast-growing, and could be deployed in barren, windy and salty areas such as Cornwall. Eventually they found the six original trees developed by Leyland, and began propagating the species. In 1953, a freak tornado blew down one of the original trees at Haggerston (the other original five trees still survive), on which the research division of the Forestry Commission started developing additional hybrids. Commercial nurseries spotted the plant's potential, and for many years, it was the biggest-selling item in every garden centre in Great Britain, making up to 10% of their total sales.

== Uses ==
They continue to be popular for cultivation in parks and gardens. Leyland cypress trees are commonly planted to quickly form fence or protection hedges. However, their rapid growth (up to 1 m per year), their thick shade and their large potential size (often more than 20 m high in garden conditions, and they can reach at least 35 m) make them problematic.

== Cultivars ==
The cultivar 'Gold Rider' has gained the Royal Horticultural Society's Award of Garden Merit (confirmed 2017), though the original hybrid has now lost its AGM status.

Other cultivars include 'Castlewellan Gold', 'Douglas Gold', 'Leighton Green', 'Drabb', 'Haggerston Grey', 'Emerald Isle', 'Ferndown', 'Golconda', 'Golden Sun', 'Gold Rider', 'Grecar', 'Green Spire', 'Grelive', Haggerston 3, Haggerston 4, Haggerston 5, Haggerston 6, 'Harlequin', 'Herculea', 'Hyde Hall', 'Irish Mint', 'Jubilee', 'Medownia', 'Michellii', 'Moncal', 'Naylor's Blue', 'New Ornament', 'Olive's Green', 'Robinson's Gold', 'Rostrevor', 'Silver Dust', 'Variegata', 'Ventose', and 'Winter Sun'.

== Legal aspects ==
The plant's rapid growth and great potential height can become a serious problem. In 2005 in the United Kingdom, an estimated 17,000 households were involved in disputes over the height of garden hedges. Such disputes between neighbours have been known to deteriorate into violence and in at least one case, culminate in murder when in 2001, retired Environment Agency officer Llandis Burdon, 57, was shot dead after an alleged dispute over a leylandii hedge in Talybont-on-Usk, Powys.

Part VIII of the United Kingdom's Anti-social Behaviour Act 2003, introduced in 2005, gave a way for people in England and Wales affected by high hedges (usually, but not necessarily, of leylandii) to ask their local authority to investigate complaints about the hedges, and gave the authorities in England and Wales power to have the hedges reduced in height. In May 2008, UK resident Christine Wright won a 24-year legal battle to have her neighbour's leylandii trees cut down for blocking sunlight to her garden.

Legislation with similar effect followed in Northern Ireland, Isle of Man and Scotland.

== Gallery ==
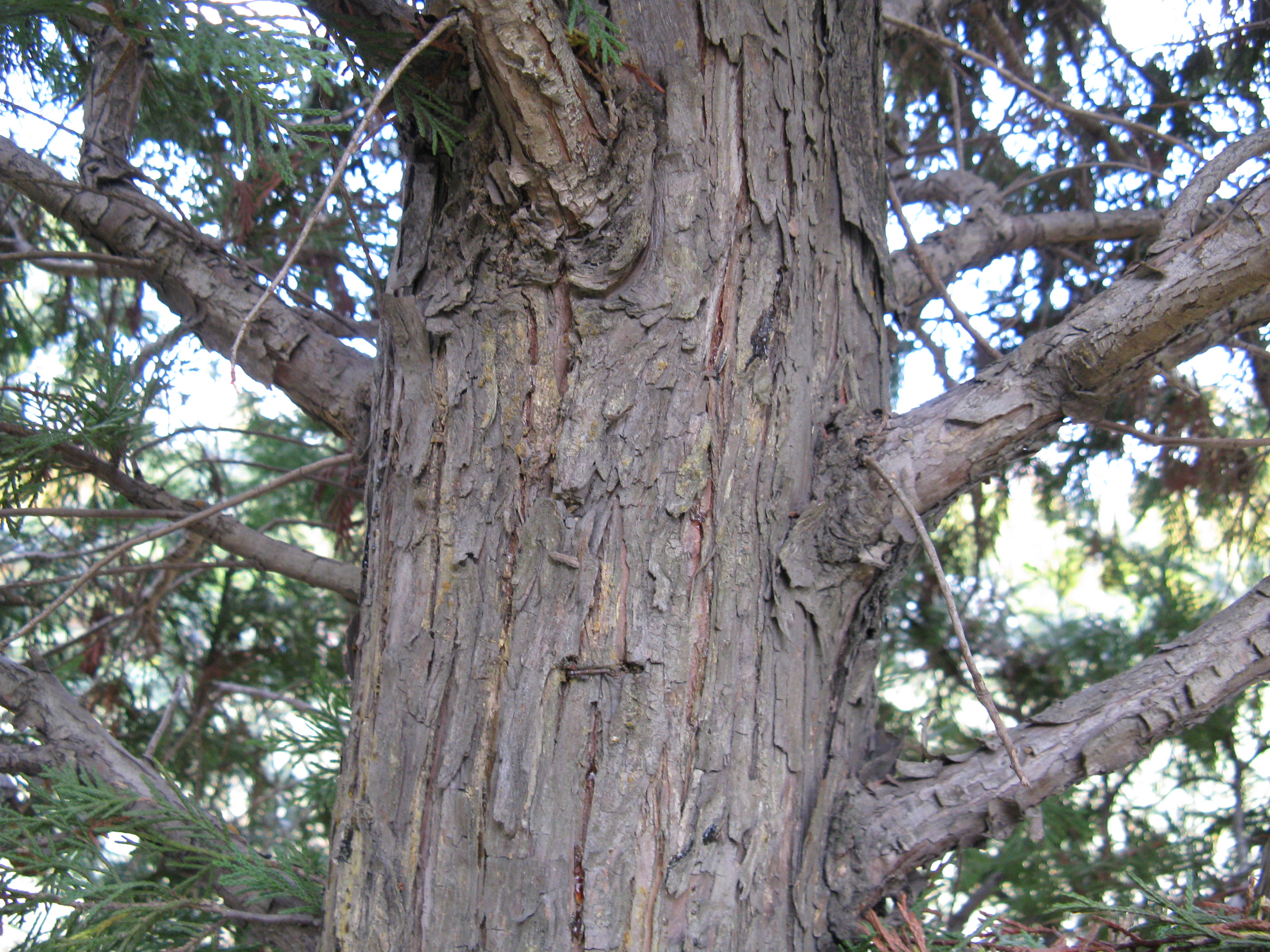
Trunk

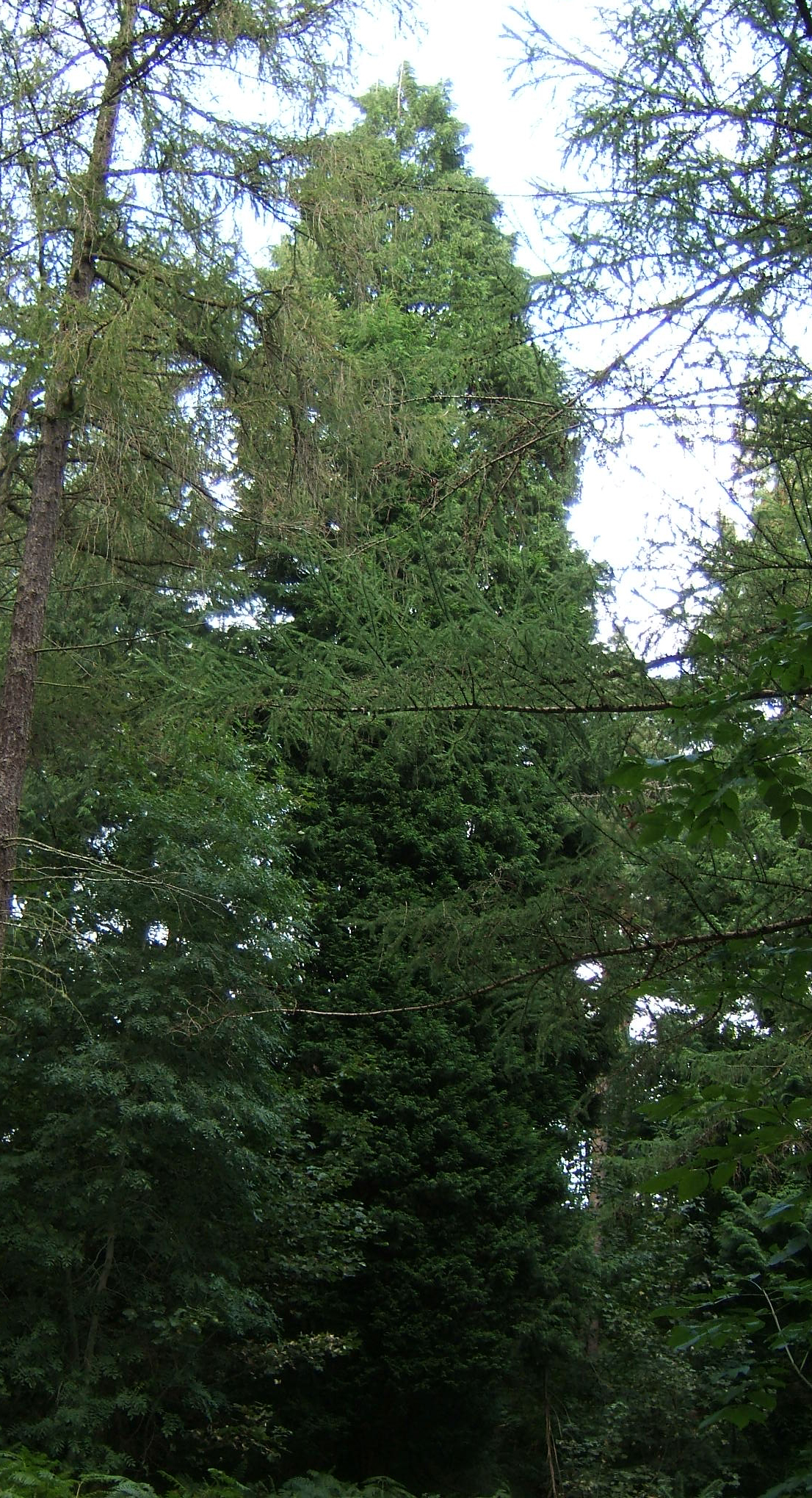
A 35-m-tall tree

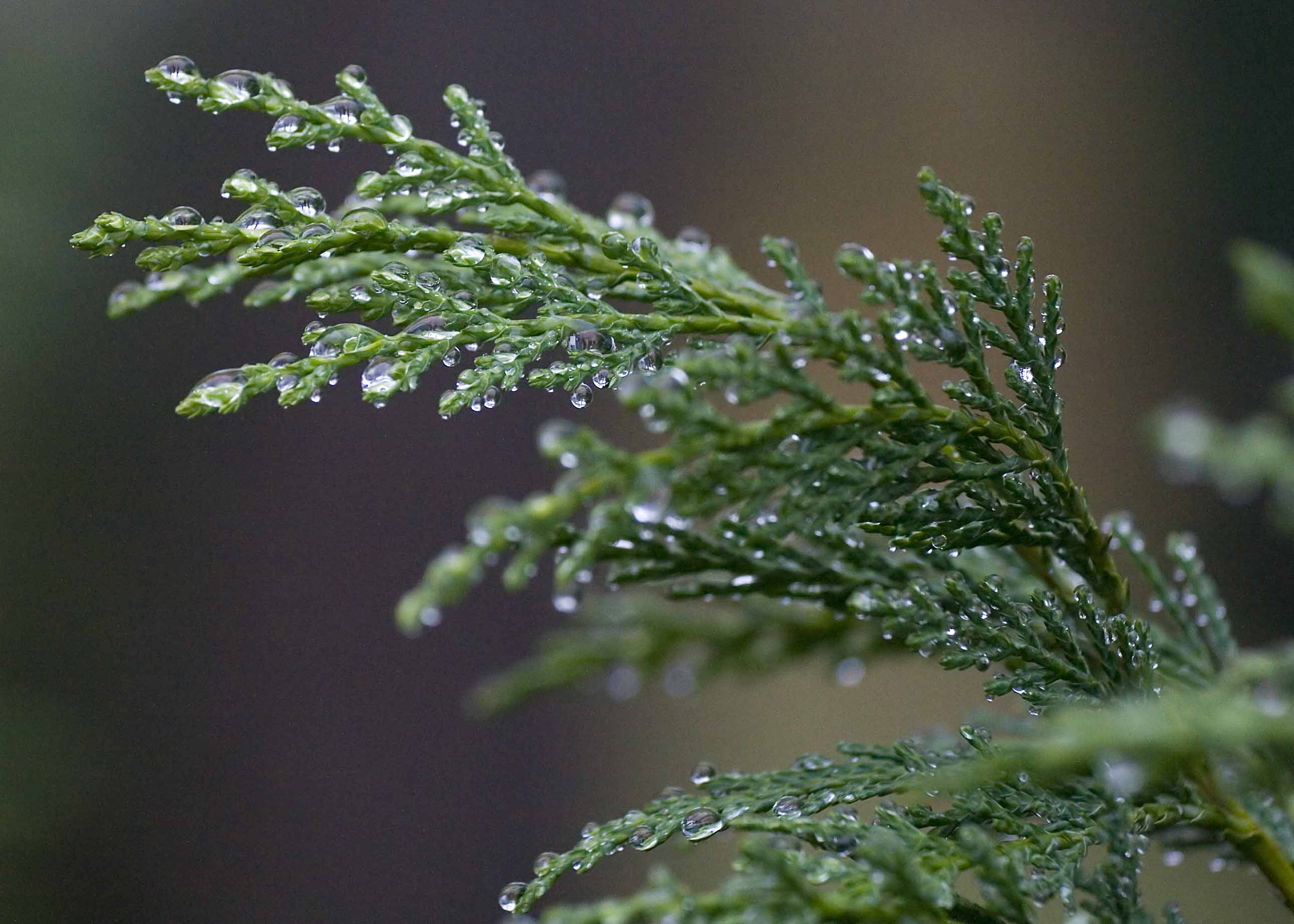
Foliage closeup

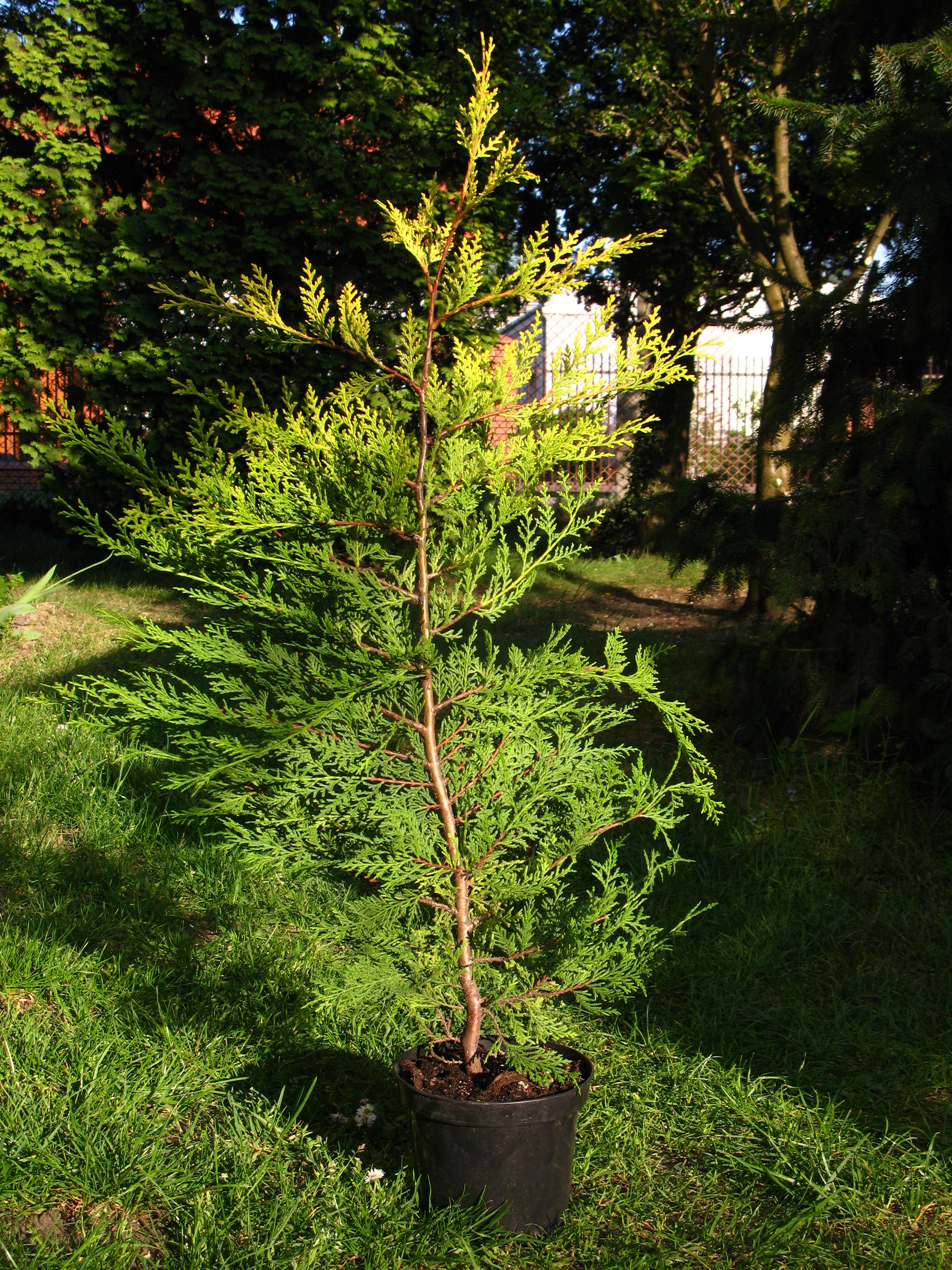
Potted specimen

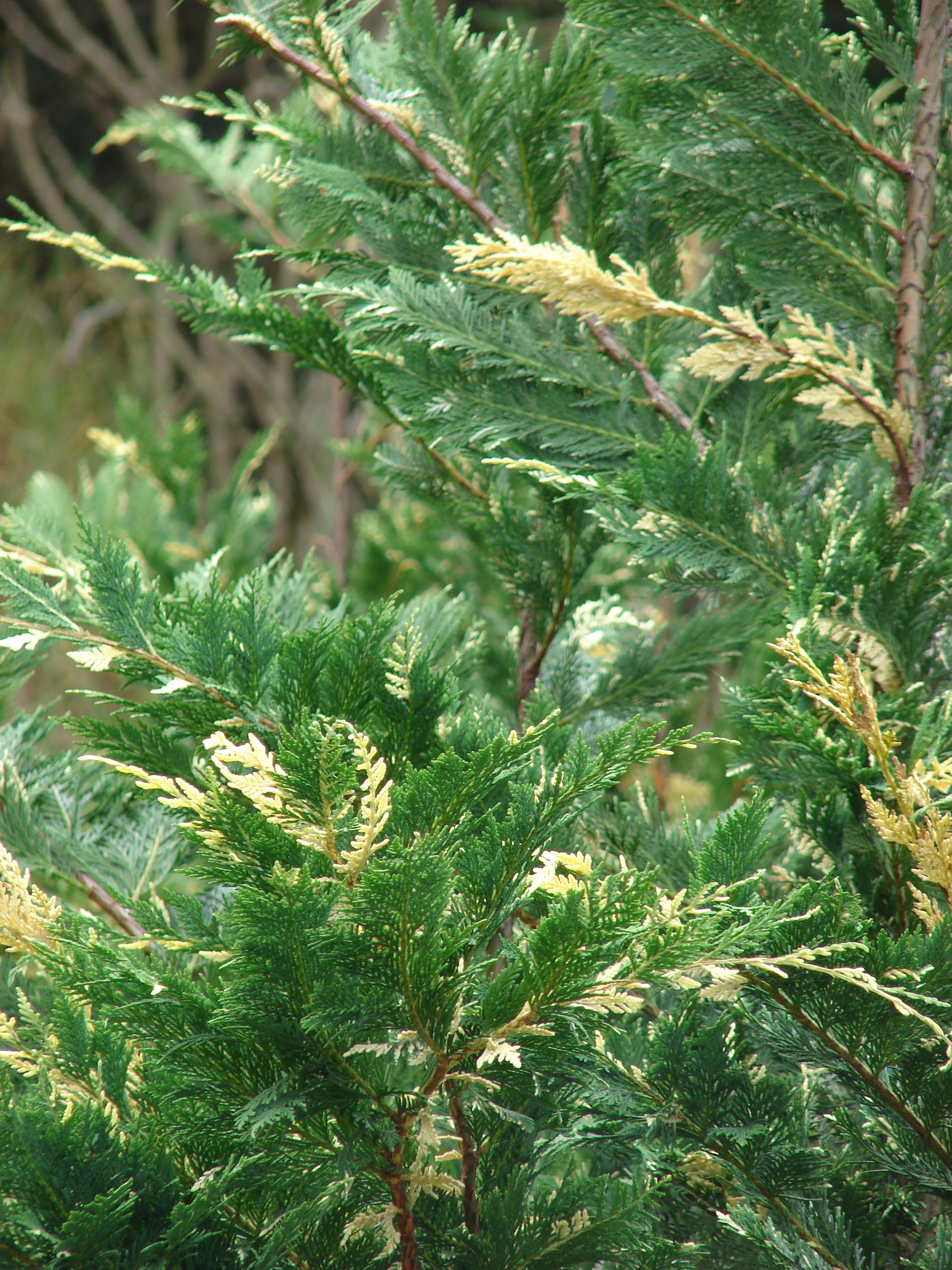
Cultivated leyland

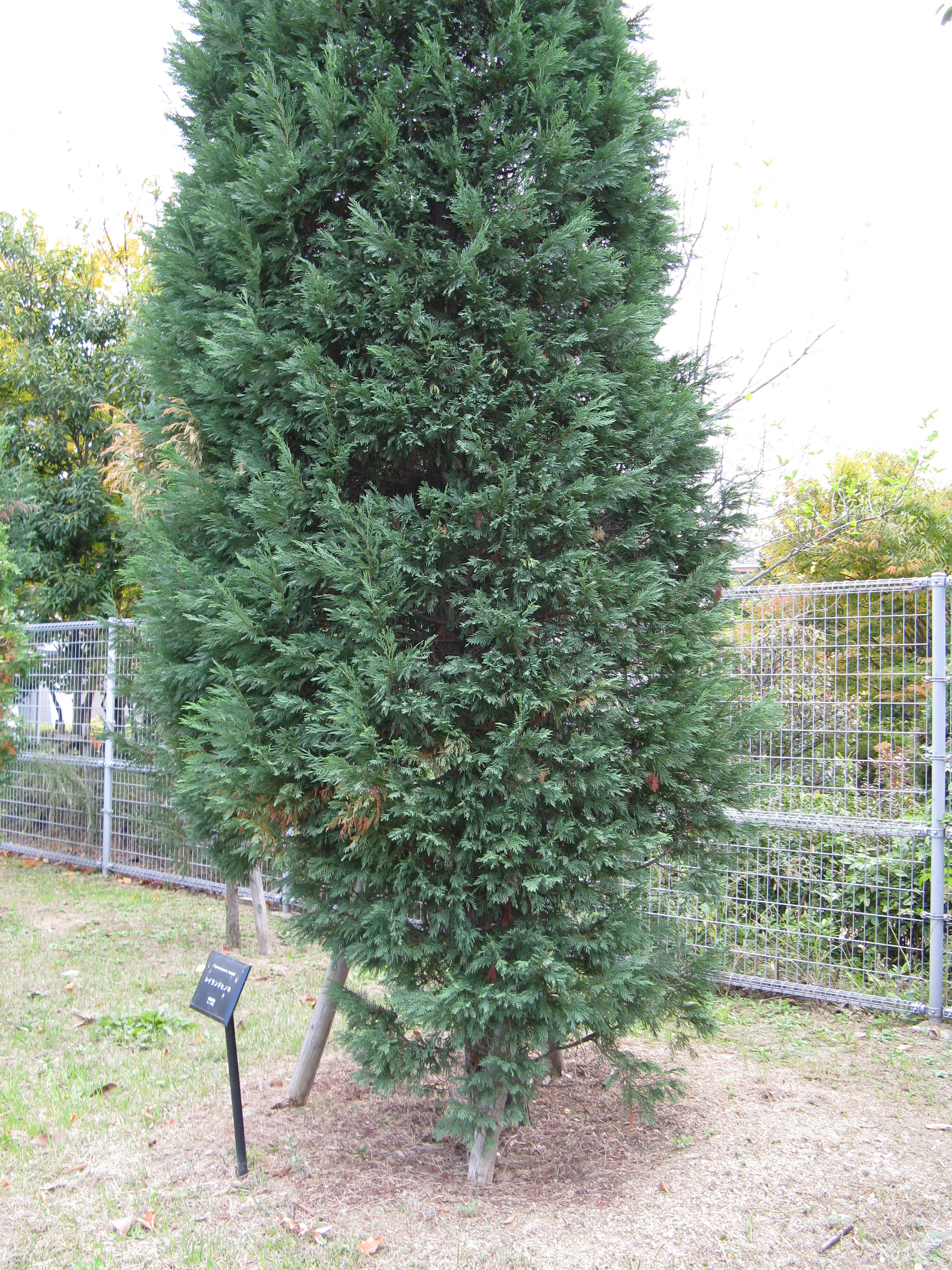
A small tree

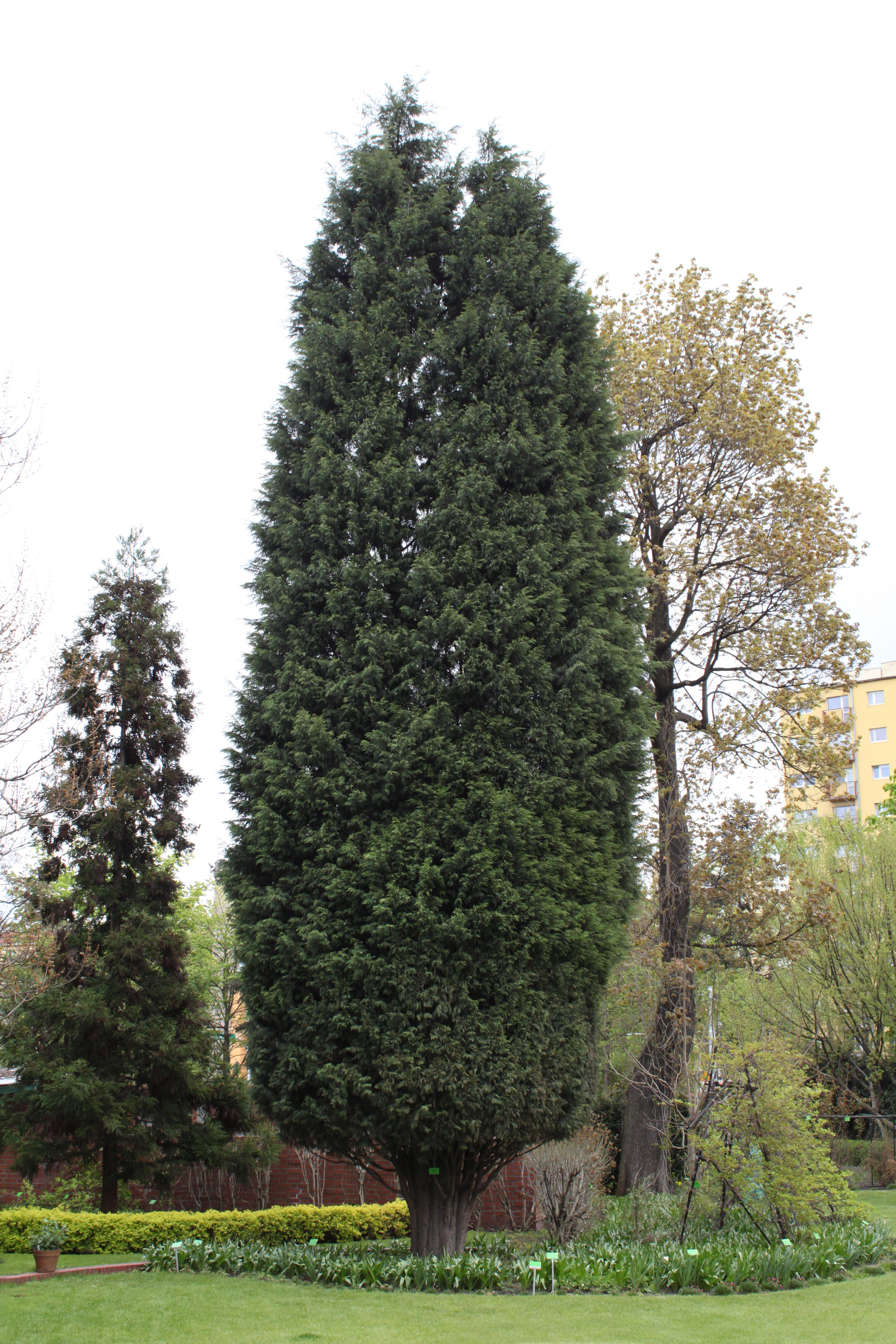
In a botanical garden in Wrocław

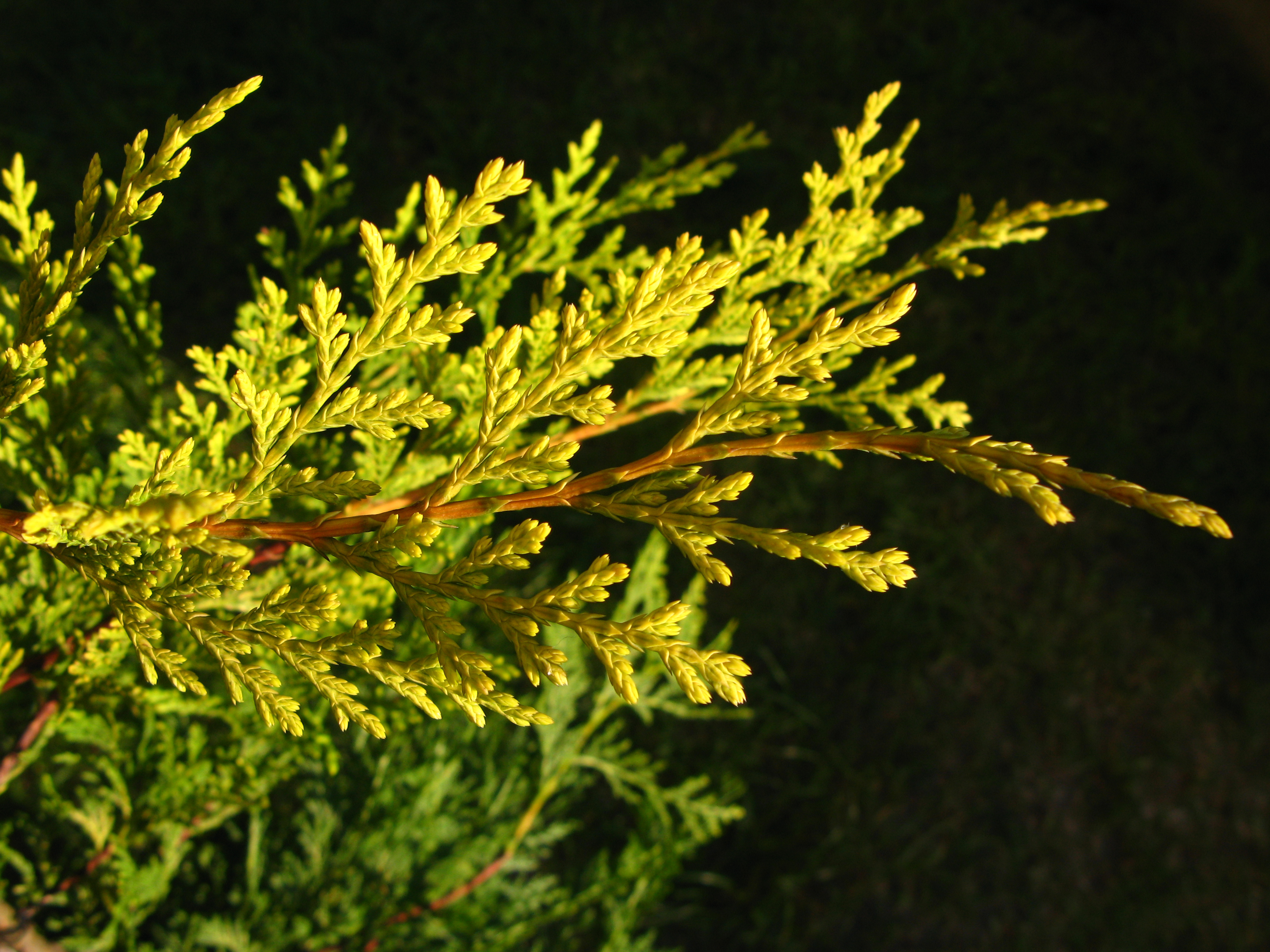
'Castlewellan Gold' golden leaves
