= Cheswick, Northumberland =

Village in Northumberland, England

Coordinates: 55.712°N 1.946°W

Cheswick
- Location within Northumberland
- OS grid reference: NU035465
- Unitary authority: Northumberland
- Ceremonial county: Northumberland
- Region: North East
- Country: England
- Sovereign state: United Kingdom
- Post town: BERWICK-UPON-TWEED
- Postcode district: TD15
- Dialling code: 01289
- Police: Northumbria
- Fire: Northumberland
- Ambulance: North East
- UK Parliament: North Northumberland

Cheswick is a village in Northumberland, England. It is situated approximately south-east of Berwick-upon-Tweed, between the A1 and the North Sea coast.

== Governance ==
Cheswick is in the parliamentary constituency of Berwick-upon-Tweed.

== Cheswick House ==
Cheswick House is a Grade II listed Victorian country house built in 1859 by Robert Crossman of Berwick-upon-Tweed, a brewer. In 1883 it was inherited by his son, Colonel (later Sir) William Crossman; the property remained in the Crossman family until 2002.
