= Maxwell-Scott baronets =

Extinct baronetcy in the Baronetage of the United Kingdom

The Haggerston, later Maxwell-Scott Baronetcy, of Haggerston in the County of Northumberland, was created in the Baronetage of England on 15 August 1642 for Thomas Haggerston, of Haggerton Castle, Northumberland, a loyal Royalist who served as a colonel in the army of King Charles I (for information on the early history of the Haggerston family see Haggerston Castle). The Haggerston were recusant in the 17th century and the estates were sequestered and forfeit to the Commonwealth of England in 1649 but were repurchased by the first Baronet in 1653. The line of the fourth Baronet failed on the death of the twelfth Baronet in 1972. The title reverted to the line of William Haggerston, second son of the third Baronet and younger brother of the fourth Baronet. In 1746 he inherited estates in Yorkshire from his great-uncle Sir Marmaduke Francis Constable, 4th and last Baronet, of Everingham (see Constable baronets), and assumed the surname of Constable in lieu of his patronymic. In 1758 he married Winifred, daughter of Robert Maxwell, titular sixth Earl of Nithsdale, and assumed by Royal licence the additional surname of Maxwell. Winifred was considered the heiress to the Scottish lordship of Herries of Terregles held (de jure) by her father. Constable-Maxwell built a new house at Everingham Park on the Constable estate in Yorkshire.

His grandson, William Constable-Maxwell, managed to claim the lordship in 1848, when the descendants of the fifth Earl of Nithsdale (who had been attainted) were restored in blood by an Act of Parliament. His eldest son, the eleventh Lord, died without male issue and was succeeded in the lordship by his eldest daughter (see the Lord Herries of Terregles for further history of this title). In 1874 the tenth Lord's third son the Hon. Joseph married Mary Monica, daughter of J. Robert Hope Scott by his wife Charlotte Lockhart, granddaughter and heiress of Sir Walter Scott, the great author (see Scott baronets). Joseph's eldest son was created a baronet in his own right in 1932 (see below). Joseph's third son Malcolm Joseph Raphael Constable Maxwell-Scott was a Rear-Admiral in the Royal Navy. He was the father of Michael Fergus Constable Maxwell-Scott, who succeeded his kinsman as thirteenth Baronet in 1972. The present Baronet is also in remainder to the lordship of Herries of Terregles, a title held by his kinswoman Jane Kerr, 16th Lady Herries of Terregles.

== Haggerston, later Maxwell-Scott baronets, of Haggerston (1642) ==
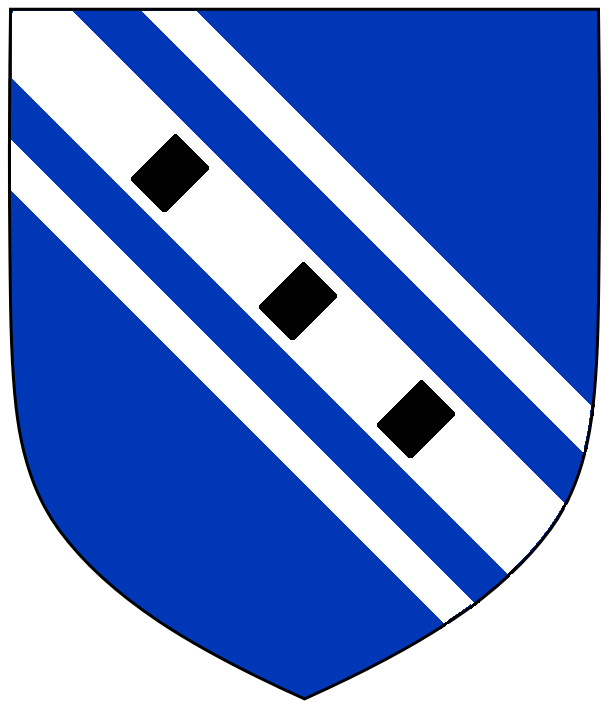
Arms of Haggerston baronets: azure, on a bend cotised, argent, three billets sable

- Sir Thomas Haggerston, 1st Baronet (c. 1594 – 1673).
- Sir Thomas Haggerston, 2nd Baronet (died 1710)
- Sir Carnaby Haggerston, 3rd Baronet (1700–1756)
- Sir Thomas Haggerston, 4th Baronet (1722–1777)
- Sir Carnaby Haggerston, 5th Baronet (1756–1831)
- Sir Thomas Haggerston, 6th Baronet (1785–1842)
- Sir Edward Haggerston, 7th Baronet (1797–1857)
- Sir John Haggerston, 8th Baronet (1798–1858)
- Sir John de Marie Haggerston, 9th Baronet (1852–1918)
- Sir Edward Charlton de Marie Haggerston, 10th Baronet (1857–1925)
- Sir Hugh Carnaby de Marie Haggerston, 11th Baronet (1906–1971)
- Sir Ralph (Raphael) Stanley de Marie Haggerston, 12th Baronet (1912–1972)
- Sir Michael Fergus Constable Maxwell-Scott, 13th Baronet (1921–1989)
- Sir Dominic James Maxwell-Scott, 14th Baronet (born 1968)

== Extended family ==
The Constable-Maxwell-Scott Baronetcy, of Abbotsford in Melrose in the County of Roxburgh, was created in the Baronetage of the United Kingdom on 23 June 1932 for Walter Maxwell-Scott. The territorial designation was a revival of the title held by his ancestor Sir Walter Scott. Constable-Maxwell-Scott had no sons and on his death in 1954 the baronetcy became extinct.

== See also ==
- Walter Maxwell-Scott, only holder of the Constable-Maxwell-Scott baronetcy of Abbotsford (1932)
- Constable baronets
- Scott baronets
- Lord Herries of Terregles
- Earl of Nithsdale
- Stirling-Maxwell baronets
