= Deaths in December 2008 =

The following is a list of notable deaths in December 2008.

Entries for each day are listed alphabetically by surname. A typical entry lists information in the following sequence:

- Name, age, country of citizenship at birth, subsequent country of citizenship (if applicable), reason for notability, cause of death (if known), and reference.

== December 2008 ==
=== 1 ===
- Thomas R. Adams, 87, American librarian.
- Paul Benedict, 70, American television actor (The Jeffersons).
- James Bree, 85, British actor (On Her Majesty's Secret Service, Satan's Slave, Doctor Who).
- Beverly Dustrude, 82, American baseball player (AAGPBL)
- Betty Goodwin, 85, Canadian artist.
- Jodami, 23, Irish-bred, British-trained Thoroughbred racehorse, injury.
- Tom Kirby, 61, Irish darts player, pancreatic cancer.
- Siegfried Knappe, 91, German Wehrmacht artillery and General Staff officer, author (Soldat).
- Mikel Laboa, 74, Spanish Basque singer and songwriter.
- Raymond Lederer, 70, American politician, U.S. Representative from Pennsylvania (1977–1981), lung cancer.
- Lav Mantula, 79, Yugoslavian football player and coach.
- Emanuel Rackman, 98, American Orthodox rabbi; President of Bar-Ilan University.
- H. Sridhar, 50, Indian sound engineer, heart attack.
- Dorothy Sterling, 95, American writer and historian.
- Sir John Wall, 78, British jurist and blind rights campaigner.
- Joseph B. Wirthlin, 91, American Mormon prelate, Apostle of The Church of Jesus Christ of Latter-day Saints, natural causes.

=== 2 ===
- Carlos Abascal, 59, Mexican public official, Secretary of the Interior (2005–2006), cancer.
- Kathleen Baskin-Ball, 50, American minister (United Methodist Church), cancer.
- Frank Crean, 92, Australian politician, Treasurer (1972–1974), Deputy Prime Minister (1975), after short illness.
- Elizabeth Warnock Fernea, 81, American writer, filmmaker and scholar, after long illness.
- Leïla Karam, 80, Lebanese actress, after long illness.
- Margarita Karapanou, 62, Greek author, respiratory problems.
- Pyotr Latyshev, 60, Russian politician, presidential envoy to Urals Federal District.
- Patrick Maitland, 17th Earl of Lauderdale, 97, British aristocrat and politician.
- Henry Molaison, 82, American amnesiac, subject of brain science study, respiratory failure.
- Odetta, 77, American folk singer and human rights activist, heart disease.
- Edward S. Rogers Jr., 75, Canadian businessman, CEO of Rogers Communications and owner of the Toronto Blue Jays, heart failure.

=== 3 ===
- William Pierson Jr., 97, American art historian.
- Oliver Selfridge, 82, British-born American computer scientist, pioneer of artificial intelligence, injuries from a fall.
- William Spoelhof, 98, American academic, President of Calvin College (1951–1976), complications from a fall.
- Elmer Valentine, 85, American nightclub owner.
- Derek Wadsworth, 69, British composer and jazz trombonist.
- Alex Widmer, 52, Swiss executive, CEO of Julius Baer bank.
- Robert Zajonc, 85, Polish-born American psychologist, pancreatic cancer.

=== 4 ===
- Forrest J Ackerman, 92, American science fiction expert, heart failure.
- Steve Bradley, 32, American wrestler.
- Ophélie Bretnacher, 22, French murder victim.
- Jan Kemp, 59, American academic, exposed bias in passing college football players, complications from Alzheimer's disease.
- Warren M. Robbins, 85, American art collector, complications from a fall.
- Richard Van Allan, 73, British opera singer, lung cancer.

=== 5 ===
- A. Bernard Ackerman, 72, American dermatopathologist, heart failure.
- Patriarch Alexy II of Moscow, 79, Estonian-born Russian primate of the Russian Orthodox Church since 1990, heart failure.
- Jimmy Anderson, 55, American rodeo clown, heart disease.
- George Brecht, 82, American artist (Fluxus), natural causes.
- Martyn Crook, 52, Australian footballer and coach, heart attack.
- Constantin Ticu Dumitrescu, 80, Romanian politician, cancer.
- Nina Foch, 84, Dutch-born American actress (Executive Suite, Spartacus, The Ten Commandments) and drama instructor, myelodysplasia.
- Joseph Gardner, 38, American convicted murderer and fugitive, execution by lethal injection.
- Beverly Garland, 82, American actress (My Three Sons), after long illness.
- Paris Herouni, 75, Armenian scientist and professor.
- Sir Basil Kelly, 88, British politician and jurist, after short illness.
- Rawson Macharia, 96, Kenyan perjurer against Jomo Kenyatta, traffic accident.
- Jean-Pierre Nguema, 76, Gabonese politician, member of the Senate of Gabon.
- Anca Parghel, 51, Romanian jazz singer, metastatic breast cancer.
- Richard Topus, 84, American World War II messenger pigeon trainer and business executive, kidney failure.
- Dick Vertlieb, 78, American baseball and basketball executive.
- Wild Again, 28, American Thoroughbred racehorse, euthanized.

=== 6 ===
- Tamar Adar, 69, Israeli children's author and poet.
- John Cumming, 78, Scottish footballer (Hearts, Scotland).
- Larry Devlin, 86, American CIA agent, emphysema.
- Sir Curtis Keeble, 86, British diplomat, Ambassador to the USSR (1978–1982).
- Gérard Lauzier, 76, French cartoonist and film director, after long illness.
- Elliot Manyika, 53, Zimbabwean politician, road accident.
- Richard Marsland, 32, Australian radio host, apparent suicide.
- Lloyd Ohlin, 90, American criminologist, complications of Shy–Drager syndrome.
- Ivan Semedi, 87, Ukrainian Roman Catholic prelate, bishop of Mukacheve.
- Sunny von Bülow, 76, American heiress, cardiopulmonary arrest.
- Peter Wardle, 77, New Zealand botanist.

=== 7 ===
- Abul Ahsan, 71, Bangladeshi diplomat and politician, cardiac arrest.
- Marky Cielo, 20, Filipino Igorot actor, suspected acute pancreatitis.
- Jimmy Gourley, 82, American jazz guitarist.
- Herbert Hutner, 99, American chairman of the Presidential Advisory Committee on the Arts (1982–1990).
- George Kuzma, 83, American Roman Catholic prelate, bishop of the Byzantine Catholic Eparchy of Van Nuys.
- Kerryn McCann, 41, Australian Olympic athlete, breast cancer.
- Georges Nguyen Van Loc, 75, French police officer, writer and actor.
- James H. Pomerene, 88, American electrical engineer.
- Roger Sonnabend, 83, American hotelier.
- John Ellis Williams, 84, British author.
- Dennis Yost, 65, American singer (Classics IV), respiratory failure.
- Mahbub Jamal Zahedi, 79, Pakistani journalist and philatelist, paralysis.

=== 8 ===
- Maurice Andrieux, 83, French politician.
- Manzoor Hussain Atif, 81, Pakistani field hockey player and administrator, after long illness.
- Frank K. Edmondson, 96, American astronomer.
- Xavier Perrot, 76, Swiss auto racer.
- Oliver Postgate, 83, British animator (Bagpuss, Clangers).
- Robert Prosky, 77, American actor (Thief, Mrs. Doubtfire, Hill Street Blues), complications following heart surgery.
- Bob Spiers, 63, British television director (Absolutely Fabulous, Fawlty Towers).
- William S. Stevens, 60, American lawyer, heart attack.
- Hillary Waugh, 88, American mystery writer.

=== 9 ===
- Jonathan Bailey, 69, British Anglican prelate, Bishop of Derby (1995–2005) and Clerk of the Closet (1997–2005).
- Emmanuel Bitanga, 55, Cameroonian Olympic sprinter.
- Ibrahim Dossey, 36, Ghanaian footballer, car accident.
- James Fergason, 74, American inventor.
- Yuri Glazkov, 69, Russian cosmonaut.
- Dražan Jerković, 72, Croatian football player and manager, heart failure.
- José María Larrauri Lafuente, 90, Spanish Roman Catholic prelate, bishop of Vitoria.
- Howard Pack, 90, American businessman, shipping magnate, heart failure.
- Bill Patman, 81, American politician, U.S. Representative for Texas (1981–1985), cancer.
- Pentti Rummakko, 65, Finnish Olympic runner.
- George Turman, 80, American politician, Lieutenant Governor of Montana (1981–1989), natural causes.

=== 10 ===
- Henning Christiansen, 76, Danish composer.
- Mildred Constantine, 95, American curator (Museum of Modern Art), heart failure.
- Chaudhary Munawwar Hasan, 44, Indian politician, car accident.
- Dorothy Porter, 54, Australian poet (The Monkey's Mask), breast cancer.
- Didith Reyes, 60, Filipino singer, heart attack and rupture of the pancreas.
- Chris Richardson, 28, American basketball player (Harlem Globetrotters), brain aneurysm.
- Owen Wade, 87, British medical researcher and physician.
- Mizuki Yamada, 80, Japanese Olympic sailor.
- Sal Yvars, 84, American baseball player (New York Giants), amyloidosis.

=== 11 ===
- Ali Alatas, 76, Indonesian politician, Foreign Minister (1988–1999), heart attack.
- Maddie Blaustein, 48, American voice actress (Pokémon, Yu-Gi-Oh!, Chaotic), stomach virus.
- Ron Carey, 72, American labor leader (Teamsters), lung cancer.
- Robert Chandler, 80, American CBS executive, heart failure.
- Elie Amsini Kiswaya, 80, Congolese Roman Catholic prelate, bishop of Sakania-Kipushi.
- Angeliki Laiou, 67, Greek historian, anaplastic thyroid cancer.
- Bettie Page, 85, American pin-up model and actress, complications from a heart attack.
- Robert Shepherd, 71, American academic lawyer.
- Yeh Shih-tao, 83, Taiwanese writer, colorectal cancer.

=== 12 ===
- David Charteris, 12th Earl of Wemyss, 96, British aristocrat and public servant.
- Paddy Dooley, 82, Irish Olympic rower.
- Avery Dulles, 90, American Roman Catholic Jesuit priest, theologian and cardinal.
- Max Elbin, 88, American golfer, president of the PGA (1965−1968), heart failure.
- Daniel Carleton Gajdusek, 85, American virologist, recipient of the Nobel Prize for Physiology or Medicine (1976).
- Sigitas Geda, 65, Lithuanian poet.
- Van Johnson, 92, American actor (Battleground, The Caine Mutiny, Brigadoon).
- Emmanuel Kasonde, 72, Zambian economist and politician, Finance Minister (1967−1971).
- Tassos Papadopoulos, 74, Cypriot politician, President (2003−2008), small cell lung carcinoma.
- Maksym Pashayev, 20, Ukrainian footballer, car accident.
- Amalia Solórzano, 97, Mexican First Lady (1934–1940), respiratory complications.
- Robin Toner, 54, American journalist (The New York Times), colon cancer.

=== 13 ===
- Doris Totten Chase, 85, American painter and sculptor.
- Christmas Past, 29, American Thoroughbred racehorse, infirmities of old age.
- Sir David Clutterbuck, 95, British admiral.
- John Drake, 49, New Zealand rugby union player.
- Mario Álvarez Dugan, 77, Dominican journalist and newspaper editor, heart problems.
- Otto Felix, 65, American actor (Up in Smoke), amyloidosis.
- Vince Karalius, 76, British rugby league player, cancer.
- David Margolis, 78, American industrialist, cardiac arrest.
- Maurice Meersman, 86, Belgian cyclist.
- Kjartan Slettemark, 76, Norwegian political artist, heart failure.
- Kathy Staff, 80, British actress (Last of the Summer Wine, Crossroads, Mary Reilly), brain tumour.
- Horst Tappert, 85, German actor (Derrick).

=== 14 ===
- Véronique Ahoyo, 69, Beninese politician, car accident.
- K. P. Appan, 72, Indian literary critic.
- Mike Bell, 37, American professional wrestler (WWF, ECW), heart attack.
- Hank Goldup, 90, Canadian ice hockey player.
- Henri G. Hers, 85, Belgian biochemist.
- William Kaufmann, 90, American nuclear strategist, adviser to seven Defense Secretaries, Alzheimer's disease.
- Carl Kotchian, 94, American aviation executive, president of Lockheed.
- Gastón Parra, 75, Venezuelan academic and banker, after long illness.
- Candida Tobin, 82, British music educator.
- Nick Willhite, 67, American baseball player (Los Angeles Dodgers), cancer.

=== 15 ===
- Hassib Ben Ammar, 84, Tunisian politician and journalist/editor.
- Valentin Berlinsky, 83, Russian cellist, after long illness.
- Mike Blum, 65, Canadian football player (Toronto Argonauts, Hamilton Tiger-Cats), cerebral hemorrhage.
- Carlo Caracciolo, 83, Italian publisher (La Repubblica).
- León Febres Cordero, 77, Ecuadorian president (1984–1988), complications from pulmonary emphysema.
- Davey Graham, 68, British guitarist, lung cancer.
- Wanda Koczeska, 71, Polish actress.
- David Lieber, 83, Polish-born American biblical scholar, lung ailment.
- John W. Powell, 89, Chinese-born American journalist tried for sedition, complications from pneumonia.
- Gian Franco Romagnoli, 82, Italian chef, author, television personality.
- Clyde Sproat, 78, American musician.
- Anne-Cath. Vestly, 88, Norwegian children's writer and actress.
- John Webster, 95, Australian activist.
- Jay E. Welch, 83, American musician, founder of the Mormon Youth Symphony and Chorus.

=== 16 ===
- Claudio Apollonio, 87, Italian ice hockey player.
- Peg Batty, 88, New Zealand cricketer.
- Evelyn Bonaci, 92, Maltese politician, MP.
- Sam Bottoms, 53, American actor (Apocalypse Now, The Last Picture Show, The Outlaw Josey Wales), glioblastoma multiforme.
- Richard Coleman, 78, British actor.
- George Constantinou, 75, Cypriot-born Papua New Guinean businessman, aggravated assault during carjacking.
- Serigne Lamine Diop, 74, Senegalese statistician and politician.
- Julius Fast, 89, American writer.
- Harold Gramatges, 90, Cuban composer and pianist.
- Joe Krol, 89, Canadian football player (Toronto Argonauts).
- Norberto Raffo, 69, Argentinian football player and manager (Banfield).
- John E. Sprizzo, 73, American jurist, organ failure.
- Zlatko Šugman, 76, Slovenian actor, illness.

=== 17 ===
- Liz Abrahams, 83, South African political activist and trade unionist.
- Turgun Alimatov, 85, Uzbek musician.
- Ismet Bajramović, 42, Bosnian reputed organized crime figure and wartime commander, suicide by gunshot.
- Sammy Baugh, 94, American football player (Washington Redskins) and member of the Pro Football Hall of Fame.
- Freddy Breck, 66, German schlager singer, cancer.
- Ved Prakash Goyal, 82, Indian politician, brain tumor.
- Paul Greco, 53, American actor (The Warriors, Broadway Danny Rose, The Cable Guy), lung cancer.
- Gregoire, 66, Congolese African-born primate, oldest known chimpanzee.
- Ai Iijima, 36, Japanese media personality and AIDS activist, former adult film actress, pneumonia.
- Justin Levens, 28, American mixed martial art fighter, possible suicide by gunshot.
- Luis Félix López, 76, Ecuadorian writer and politician, Secretary of Government, cancer.
- Willoughby Sharp, 72, American artist, art dealer, curator and impresario, throat cancer.
- Dave Smith, 53, American baseball pitcher (Houston Astros), heart attack.
- Feliciano Vierra Tavares, 88, American musician and singer, father of the Tavares Brothers, prostate cancer.
- Henry Ashby Turner, 76, American historian, melanoma.
- Nina Varlamova, 54, Russian politician, mayor of Kandalaksha, stabbed.

=== 18 ===
- Majel Barrett, 76, American actress (Star Trek), leukemia.
- Peter Malam Brothers, 91, British Royal Air Force pilot, Battle of Britain ace.
- Pete Case, 67, American football player (New York Giants), after long illness.
- John Costelloe, 47, American actor (The Sopranos, Kazaam, Die Hard 2), suicide by gunshot.
- Jack Douglas, 81, British comedy actor (Carry On films), pneumonia.
- Mark Felt, 95, American public official, deputy director of the FBI, "Deep Throat" in the Watergate scandal, heart failure.
- Hannah Frank, 100, British sculptor.
- Nahla Hussain al-Shaly, 37, Iraqi women's rights activist, shot and decapitated.
- Robert Jonquet, 83, French footballer, after long illness.
- Ian MacMillan, 67, American author.
- Mellory Manning, 27, New Zealand murder victim.
- Conor Cruise O'Brien, 91, Irish politician, writer and academic.
- Ivan Rabuzin, 87, Croatian painter.
- Harold Snyder, 86, American pharmaceuticals magnate, pioneer of generic drugs, respiratory failure.
- Paul Weyrich, 66, American conservative activist, co-founder of The Heritage Foundation think tank, diabetes.

=== 19 ===
- James Bevel, 72, American civil rights leader, pancreatic cancer.
- Page Cavanaugh, 86, American jazz pianist and singer, kidney failure.
- Carol Chomsky, 78, American linguist, wife of Noam Chomsky, cancer.
- Michael Connell, 45, American political strategist, plane crash.
- Kenny Cox, 68, American jazz musician, lung cancer.
- Sir Bernard Crick, 79, British political theorist, cancer.
- Dock Ellis, 63, American baseball player (Pittsburgh Pirates), cirrhosis.
- Vi Hilbert, 90, American tribal leader.
- Neal Kenyon, 79, American theater director.
- Joe L. Kincheloe, 58, American professor, heart attack.
- Matt Kofler, 49, American football player (Buffalo Bills, Indianapolis Colts).
- Derek Stanford, 90, British poet and critic.
- Sam Tingle, 87, Zimbabwean racing driver.

=== 20 ===
- Samuele Bacchiocchi, 70, Italian theologian, liver cancer.
- Joseph Conombo, 91, Burkinabé politician, Prime Minister of Upper Volta (1978–1980).
- Jack Kuehler, 76, American electrical engineer, president of I.B.M. (1989–1993), Parkinson's disease.
- Gabriel Larraín Valdivieso, 83, Chilean Roman Catholic prelate, bishop of the diocese of Santiago de Chile.
- Olga Lepeshinskaya, 92, Ukrainian-born Russian ballerina.
- Joel Mandelstam, 89, British biochemist and microbiologist.
- Adrian Mitchell, 76, British poet, heart attack.
- Robert Mulligan, 83, American film director (To Kill a Mockingbird), heart disease.
- Albin Planinc, 64, Slovenian chess grandmaster, after long illness.
- Dorothy Sarnoff, 94, American opera singer, actress and self-help consultant.
- Igor Troubetzkoy, 96, Russian auto racer.

=== 21 ===
- Chayben Abou-Nehra, 34, Belizean businessman, suicide by gunshot.
- Lady Anne Cavendish-Bentinck, 92, British noble.
- James Fulton, 58, Canadian politician, MP for Skeena (1979–1993), colon cancer.
- Teddy Gueritz, 89, British Royal Navy admiral.
- Christopher Hibbert, 84, British historian.
- Ron Hornaday Sr., 77, American NASCAR driver, cancer.
- Al Meyerhoff, 61, American lawyer, complications from leukemia.
- Carlos Manuel Santiago, 82, Puerto Rican baseball player (Negro leagues), heart failure.
- Dale Wasserman, 94, American playwright (Man of La Mancha), heart failure.
- Maurice Zilber, 88, Egyptian horse trainer, cancer.

=== 22 ===
- Yoshiro Asakuma, 94, Japanese Olympic athlete.
- Anand Babla, 54, Fijian politician, MP (1992–2006), after long illness.
- Coy Bacon, 66, American football player (Los Angeles Rams, Cincinnati Bengals, Washington Redskins).
- Lansana Conté, 74, Guinean politician, President of Guinea since 1984, after long illness.
- Norm Cook, 53, American basketball player (Kansas Jayhawks, Boston Celtics).
- Ossie Dawson, 89, South African cricketer.
- Jani Lehtonen, 40, Finnish pole vaulter.
- Robert J. Marshall, 90, American minister, president of the Lutheran Church in America (1968–1978), heart failure.
- Hugh Myers, 78, American chess player and author.
- Erkki Puolakka, 83, Finnish Olympic runner.
- Alfred Shaheen, 86, American textile manufacturer, popularized the Hawaiian shirt, complications of diabetes.
- Guy Warren, 85, Ghanaian jazz musician, illness.

=== 23 ===
- Clint Ballard Jr., 77, American songwriter ("You're No Good").
- Manuel Benitez, 39, American child actor and FBI fugitive, shot.
- Narciso Bernardo, 71, Filipino basketball player, cardiac arrest.
- Thomas Congdon, 77, American editor, Parkinson's disease and heart failure.
- Frank Krog, 54, Norwegian actor.
- Mitsugu Saotome, 82, Japanese author.
- Héctor Thomas, 70, Venezuelan Olympic decathlete, cancer.
- Ron Unsworth, 85, British Olympic hurdler.
- Thierry Magon de La Villehuchet, 65, French money manager and businessman, apparent suicide by drug overdose and exsanguination.
- Eric Charles Twelves Wilson, 96, British recipient of the Victoria Cross.
- Arnold Jacob Wolf, 84, American rabbi, heart attack.

=== 24 ===
- Ian Ballinger, 83, New Zealand sport shooter, 1968 Olympic medallist.
- Ray Deakin, 49, British footballer (Bolton Wanderers, Burnley), brain cancer.
- Stanley Eveling, 83, British playwright.
- Gordon Fairweather, 85, Canadian politician, MP for Royal, New Brunswick (1962–1977).
- Ralph Harris, 87, British journalist, respiratory failure.
- Samuel P. Huntington, 81, American political scientist, heart failure and complications of diabetes.
- Harold Pinter, 78, British playwright (The Homecoming), recipient of the Nobel Prize for Literature (2005), throat cancer.
- Rik Renders, 86, Belgian cyclist.
- Alf Robertson, 67, Swedish singer and composer.
- Ruhlmann, 23, American Thoroughbred racehorse, aneurism.

=== 25 ===
- Edd Cartier, 94, American illustrator (The Shadow).
- Alvah Chapman Jr., 87, American publisher and philanthropist, pneumonia.
- Justin Eilers, 30, American mixed martial artist, shot.
- Olívio Aurélio Fazza, 83, Brazilian Roman Catholic prelate, bishop of the Diocese of Foz do Iguaçu.
- Leo Frankowski, 65, American science fiction author.
- William Glendon, 89, American attorney.
- Lars Hollmer, 60, Swedish musician.
- Eartha Kitt, 81, American singer and actress (Batman, The Emperor's New Groove, Holes), colon cancer.
- Ann Savage, 87, American actress (Detour), complications from stroke.
- Robert Ward, 70, American blues singer and guitarist.
- Colin White, 57, British naval historian, cancer.

=== 26 ===
- Jaroslav Fikejz, 81, Czech Olympic athlete.
- Israel Horowitz, 92, American record producer.
- Eberhard Kneisl, 92, Austrian Olympic alpine skier.
- Gösta Krantz, 83, Swedish actor.
- Mikhail Krichevsky, 111, Ukrainian supercentenarian.
- Alan W. Lear, 55, Scottish writer.
- George Miller, 69, British footballer and manager (Falkirk FC, Wolverhampton Wanderers), cancer.
- Sir Kenneth Stoddart, 94, British Lord Lieutenant of Merseyside (1979–1989).
- Dick Voris, 86, American football player and coach.
- J. Lamar Worzel, 89, American oceanographer, heart attack.
- Wyvetter H. Younge, 78, American politician, member of the Illinois House of Representatives since 1975, surgical complications.

=== 27 ===
- Arild Andresen, 80, Norwegian footballer and ice hockey player (Vålerenga).
- Rodrigo Arango Velásquez, 83, Colombian Roman Catholic prelate, Bishop of the Diocese of Buga.
- Delaney Bramlett, 69, American songwriter and record producer, complications from gallbladder surgery.
- Sailor Brown, 93, British footballer and manager.
- Roque Cordero, 91, Panamanian-born American composer.
- John Fenton, 87, British Anglican priest and New Testament scholar.
- Robert Graham, 70, Mexican-born American sculptor, husband of actress Anjelica Huston, after long illness.
- Ian Harland, 76, British Anglican prelate, Bishop of Carlisle (1989–2000), after long illness.
- Michael Hicks, 80, British army general.
- Ja'afar of Negeri Sembilan, 86, Malaysian King (1994–1999), Great Ruler of Negeri Sembilan since 1967.
- Patricia Kneale, 83, British actress.
- Iain MacLean, 55, Australian politician, Western Australian MLC for North Metropolitan (1994–1996) and MLA for Wanneroo (1996–2001).
- Christine Maggiore, 52, American AIDS denialist, pneumonia.
- Sheoo Mewalal, 82, Indian footballer, natural causes.
- Alfred Pfaff, 82, German footballer, 1954 FIFA World Cup winner.

=== 28 ===
- Quentin C. Aanenson, 87, American fighter pilot, cancer.
- A. O. L. Atkin, 83, American mathematician, complications from a fall.
- Willie Clark, 90, Scottish footballer (Hibernian, St Johnstone).
- Vincent Ford, 68, Jamaican reggae songwriter ("No Woman, No Cry"), complications from diabetes.
- Donald Gleason, 88, American physician, creator of prostate cancer test, heart attack.
- Sir Michael Levey, 81, British art historian, Director of the National Gallery (1973–1986).
- Oliver Lincoln Lundquist, 92, American architect and industrial designer, created the United Nations logo, prostate cancer.
- Haralamb Zincă, 85, Romanian writer, Alzheimer's disease.

=== 29 ===
- Manjit Bawa, 67, Indian painter, after long illness.
- William Ellis Green, 85, Australian cartoonist.
- Jim Horne, 91, American model, heart failure.
- Freddie Hubbard, 70, American jazz trumpeter, complications from a heart attack.
- Victor H. Krulak, 95, American Marine Corps officer.
- Vladislav Lalicki, 73, Serbian production designer.
- Ted Lapidus, 79, French fashion designer, respiratory failure.
- Daniel Nagrin, 91, American choreographer and dancer.
- Alan Sargeson, 78, Australian chemist.
- Harlington Wood Jr., 88, American lawyer.
- Yang Jinzong, 76, Chinese chemical engineer.

=== 30 ===
- Roy Boehm, 84, American Navy SEAL commander.
- Stewart Cleveland Cureton, 78, American pastor, President of the National Baptist Convention (1999).
- Richard Genelle, 47, American actor (Mighty Morphin Power Rangers, Power Rangers: Zeo), heart attack.
- Bernie Hamilton, 80, American actor (Starsky and Hutch), cardiac arrest.
- Paul Hofmann, 96, Austrian writer, informant against the Nazis.
- Peter Karmel, 86, Australian economist.
- Roy Saari, 63, American swimmer, Olympic gold medalist (1964).

=== 31 ===
- Stan Kielty, 83, English rugby league player (Halifax, national team).
- Premjit Lall, 68, Indian tennis player, after long illness.
- Kazbek Pagiyev, 49, Russian politician, mayor of Vladikavkaz, shot.
- Brad Sullivan, 77, American actor (Slap Shot, The Prince of Tides, The Sting), liver cancer.
- Vic Washington, 62, American football player (San Francisco 49ers).
- Donald E. Westlake, 75, American mystery writer, heart attack.
