= Christopher Richardson =

Christopher Richardson may refer to:

- Christopher Richardson (Deputy Lieutenant) (1752–1825), justice of the peace
- Christopher Richardson (theatre founder)
- Christopher Richardson (figure skater)
- Chris Richardson (born 1984), American singer-songwriter
- Chris Richardson (basketball) (1980–2008), American basketball player
