= James Horne =

James Horne or Jim Horne may refer to:

- James H. Horne (1874–1959), American athletic director and coach
- James W. Horne (1881–1942), American actor, screenwriter, and film director
- James Welton Horne (1853–1922), Canadian businessman and political figure
- Jim Horne (model) (1917–2008), American model, son of James W. Horne
- Jim Horne (neuroscientist) (1946-2023), British sleep neuroscientist
- James A. Horne, Secretary of State of Mississippi 1852–1854
- Jim Horne (Florida politician) (born 1959)

== See also ==
- James Horn (disambiguation)
