= Romagnoli =

Romagnoli is an Italian surname meaning "Romagnan", "of Romagna", "from Romagna". Notable people with the surname include:

- Luca Romagnoli, Italian politician and MEP
- Leandro Romagnoli, Argentine football midfielder
- Alessio Romagnoli, Italian footballer playing for Serie A club Lazio
- Simone Romagnoli, Italian footballer born in 1990
- Martín Romagnoli, Argentine football midfielder who plays for UNAM
- Renato Romagnoli, Italian university professor and surgeon
- Riccardo Romagnoli, Italian auto racing driver
- Diana Romagnoli, Swiss fencer
- Gian Franco Romagnoli, Italian chef, author, and television personality
