= Hatun Tash =

Turkish-born British Christian preacher (born 1982)

Hatun Tash (born 1982) is a Turkish-born British Christian preacher. As a former Muslim, she is known for her public speaking and criticism of Islam at Speakers' Corner in London. Her activism and criticism of Islam has led her to become the victim of several attacks and plots against her.

== Activism ==
Tash is a former Muslim from Turkey. After emigrating to the United Kingdom, she became a student of Christian apologist Jay Smith's Oxford Centre of Christian Apologetics, and later founded the Defend Christ Critique Islam (DCCI) organisation. She first accompanied Smith to Speakers' Corner in London's Hyde Park in 2013, where she became known for activities such as displaying cartoons of Muhammad, drilling holes in the Quran and wearing a T-shirt in support of Charlie Hebdo.

Tash was arrested twice by the Metropolitan Police at Speakers' Corner in December 2020 and in May 2021. In the first instance after she was assaulted by a group of Muslim men for wearing a t-shirt featuring a picture of Muhammad, and the second time citing COVID-19 regulations. In October 2022, the police however apologised to Tash for falling "below standards", and awarded her £10,000 in compensation and costs.

== Attacks and plots ==
Tash has been the victim of several assaults. She was dragged to the ground by a mob in July 2020, punched in the face in October 2020, and surrounded by a mob "screaming for her blood" in May 2021.

In July 2021, Tash was stabbed several times during an appearance at Speakers' Corner by an unknown assailant. She suffered wounds to her face and hands. The attacker was never caught.

In September 2022, Muslim convert Edward Little was arrested for attempting to purchase a gun in order to kill Tash. He was being monitored by MI5 after he previously had considered attacking Queen Elizabeth II's funeral. In December 2023, he received a minimum prison term of 16 years.
