= List of stage names: E =

This list of stage names lists names used by those in the entertainment industry, alphabetically by their stage name's surname (or the best approximation) followed by the given name (or the best approximation) where the surname begins with "E". One-word stage names are presented in List of one-word stage names.

Stage name	Birth name	Life	Notability	Notes
Andrew E.	Andrew Ford Valentino Espiritu	1967–	Filipino rapper, actor and comedian	
Sheila E.	Sheila Cecilia Escovedo	1957–	American percussionist and singer	
Ronnie Earl	Ronald Horvath	1953–	American guitarist	
Jack Earle	Jacob Rheuben Erlich	1906–1952	American actor and performer	
Josephine Earle	Josephine MacEwan	1892–1960/1961	American actress	
Freddie Earlle	Frederick Medvidoff	1924–2017	Glaswegian actor	
Dave East	David Lawrence Brewster Jr.	1988–	American rapper	
Robert Easton	Robert Easton Burke	1930–2011	American actor	
Sleep 'n' Eat	William Best	1913–1962	American actor	Also known as Willie Best
Arzu Ece	Arzu Özkaraman	1963–	Turkish singer	
Verónica Echegui	Verónica Fernández de Echegaray	1983–2025	Spanish actress	
Johnny Eck	John Eckhart Jr.	1911–1991	American performer and actor	
Jenny Eclair	Jenny Clare Hargreaves	1960–	English comedienne and actress	
Barbara Eden	Barbara Jean Morehead	1931–	American actress	
Bobbi Eden	Priscilla Hendrikse	1980–	Dutch pornographic actress	
Chana Eden	Chana Mesyngier	1932–2019	Israeli-American actress and singer	
John Edward	John Edward McGee Jr.	1969–	American television personality and author	
Johnny Edward	John Edward Flux	1945–2021	British musician, writer and record producer	
Blake Edwards	William Blake Crump	1922–2010	American film director, producer, screenwriter and actor	
Bobby Edwards	Robert Edward Moncrief	1926–2012	American country singer	Also known as Bobby Moncrief
Jimmy Edwards	James Keith O'Neill Edwards	1920–1988	English comedy writer and actor	
Snitz Edwards	Edward Neumann	1868–1937	Hungarian-American character actor	
Steve Edwards	Steven Edward Schwartz	1948–	American retired television and radio personality	
Vince Edwards	Vincent Edward Zoine	1928–1996	American actor, director and singer	
Erica Ehm	Erica Miechowsky	1961–	Canadian writer, actress and songwriter	
Billie Eilish	Billie Eilish Pirate Baird O'Connell	2001–	American singer-songwriter and musician	
Tripp Eisen	Tod Rex Salvador	1965–	American musician (Static-X)	
Tito El Bambino	Efraín David Fines Nevares	1981–	Puerto Rican singer and songwriter (Héctor & Tito)	
Ann Elder	Anna Velders	1942–	American actress, producer and screenwriter	
Florence Eldridge	Florence McKechnie	1901–1988	American actress	
Carmen Electra	Tara Leigh Patrick	1972–	American actress, singer, model and media personality	
Professor Elemental	Paul Alborough	1975–	English singer-songwriter	
Héctor el Father	Héctor Luis Delgado Román	1979–	Puerto Rican singer and songwriter (Héctor & Tito)	
Martín Elías	Martín Elías Díaz Acosta	1990–2017	Colombian singer	
Gillian Elisa	Gillian Elizabeth Thomas	1953–	Welsh actress, singer and comedienne	
Christine Elise	Christine Elise McCarthy	1965–	American actress	
Kimberly Elise	Kimberly Elise Trammel	1967–	American actress	
Shannon Elizabeth	Shannon Elizabeth Fadal	1973–	American actress and model	
Biff Elliot	Leon Shalek	1923–2012	American actor	
Cass Elliot	Ellen Naomi Cohen	1941–1974	American singer and actress (The Mamas & the Papas)	
Graham Elliot	Graham Elliot Bowles	1977–	American chef and television personality	
Isac Elliot	Isac Elliot Lundén	2000–	Finnish-Swedish pop singer, songwriter, dancer and actor	
Gertrude Elliott	May Gertrude Dermott	1874–1950	American actress	
Maxine Elliott	Jessie Dermott	1868–1940	American actress	
Ramblin' Jack Elliott	Elliott Charles Adnopoz	1931–	American folk singer and songwriter	
Ross Elliott	Elliott Blum	1917–1999	American character actor	
Wild Bill Elliott	Gordon Nance	1904–1965	American actor	
David Ellis	Derrick Francis Kerkham	1918–1978	English writer	
Mary Ellis	May Belle Elsas	1897–2003	American actress and singer	
Patricia Ellis	Patricia Gene O'Brien	1918–1970	American actress	Known as Patricia Lefttwich following her parents' divorce
Shirley Ellis	Shirley Marie O'Garra	1929–2005	American soul singer	
Zeph Ellis	Joseph Daniel Joel Ellis-Stevenson	1988–2026	British MC, rapper, singer, songwriter and record producer	Also known as Dot Rotten, Young Dot, Mr. Three-Six, Big Dotti, Biological Father of Grime, Terror Child
James Ellison	James Ellison Smith	1910–1993	American actor	
Ziggy Elman	Harry Aaron Finkelman	1914–1968	American jazz musician	
Jordi El Niño Polla	Ángel Muñoz García	1994–	Spanish pornographic actor and producer	Also known as Jordi "Polla" and Jordi ENP
Isobel Elsom	Isabella Reed	1893–1981	English actress	
Julian Eltinge	William Julian Dalton	1881–1941	American actor	
Maurice Elvey	William Seward Folkard	1887–1967	English director	
King Kester Emeneya	Jean Kwamambu	1956–2014	Congolese singer	
Jack Emrek	Robert Hanusek	1920–2010	American actor	
Wreckless Eric	Eric Goulden	1954–	English singer-songwriter	
Leif Erickson	William Wycliffe Anderson	1911–1986	American actor	
John Ericson	Joseph Meibes	1926–2020	German-American actor	
Princess Erika	Erika Dobong'na	1964–	French singer and actress	
Leon Errol	Leonce Errol Sims	1881–1951	Australian-American comedian and actor	
Henry V. Esmond	Harry Esmond Jack	1869–1922	British actor and playwright	
Jill Esmond	Jill Esmond Jack	1908–1990	English actress	
David Essex	David Albert Cook	1947–	English singer, songwriter and actor	
Howard Estabrook	Howard Bolles	1884–1978	American actor, film director and producer	
Self Esteem	Rebecca Lucy Taylor	1986–	British musician	
Charles Esten	Charles Esten Puskar III	1965–	American actor, singer and comedian	
Pauline Ester	Sabrina Ocon	1963–	French singer	
La Esterella	Ester Lambrechts	1919–2011	Belgian singer	
Linda Estrella	Consuello Rigotti	1922–2012	Filipina actress and singer	
Little Eva	Eva Boyd	1943–2003	American singer	
Theo Evan	Evangelos Theodorou	Unknown	Greek-Cypriot singer-songwriter	
Heart Evangelista	Love Ongpauco	1985–	Filipina actress, artist and businesswoman	
Dale Evans	Frances Smith	1912–2001	American actress, singer and songwriter	Born Lucille Wood Smith, her name was changed in infancy to Frances Octavia Smith.
Joan Evans	Joan Eunson	1934–2023	American actress	
Linda Evans	Linda Evanstad	1942–	American actress	
Robert Evans	Robert Shapera	1930–2019	American film producer and actor	
Sophie Evans	Zsófia Szabó	1976–	Hungarian pornographic actress	
Judith Evelyn	Evelyn Morris	1909–1967	American-Canadian actress	
Chad Everett	Raymon Cramton	1937–2012	American actor	
Kenny Everett	Maurice Cole	1944–1995	English comedian, actor and presenter	
Mark Everett	Manuel Benitez	1969–2008	American child actor	
Steve Evets	Steven Murphy	1959–	English actor and musician	
Tom Ewell	Samuel Yewell Tompkins	1909–1994	American actor and producer	
Left Eye	Lisa Lopes	1971–2002	American rapper (TLC)	
