= Speakers' Corner =

Area where public speaking is allowed

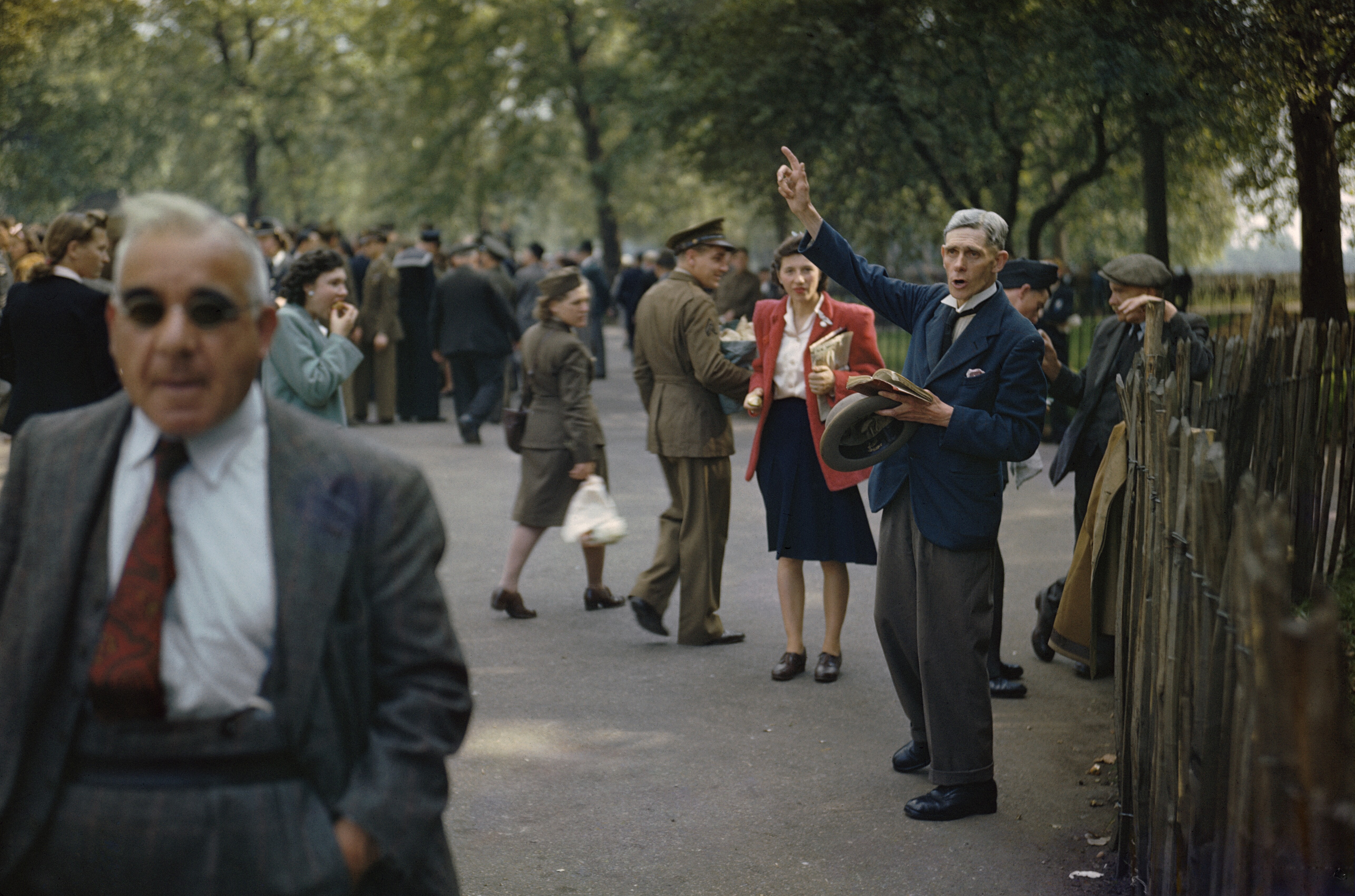
Speaker's Corner, 1944

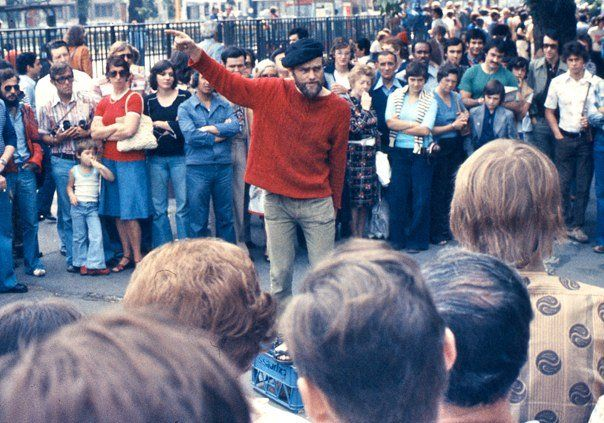
Orator at Speakers' Corner in London, 1974

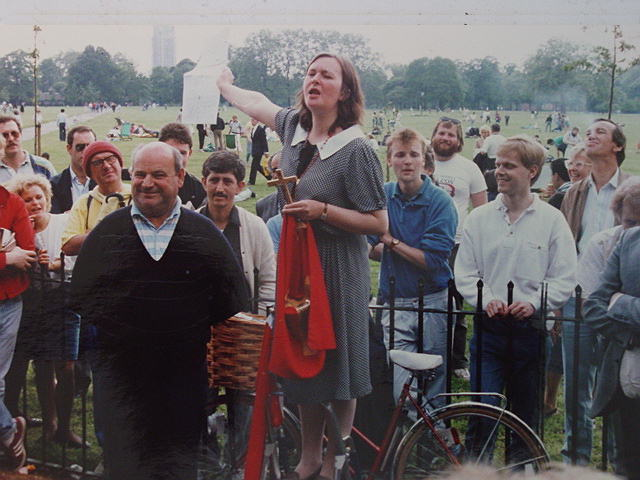
Speakers' Corner, April 1987

A Speakers' Corner is an area where free speech, open-air public speaking, debate, and discussion are allowed. The original and best known is in the north-east corner of Hyde Park in Westminster, England, near Marble Arch. Historically, there were a number of other areas designated as Speakers' Corners in other parks in London, such as Lincoln's Inn Fields, Finsbury Park, Clapham Common, Kennington Park, and Victoria Park. Speakers' Corners have been established elsewhere in the United Kingdom and in other countries.

== Hyde Park ==
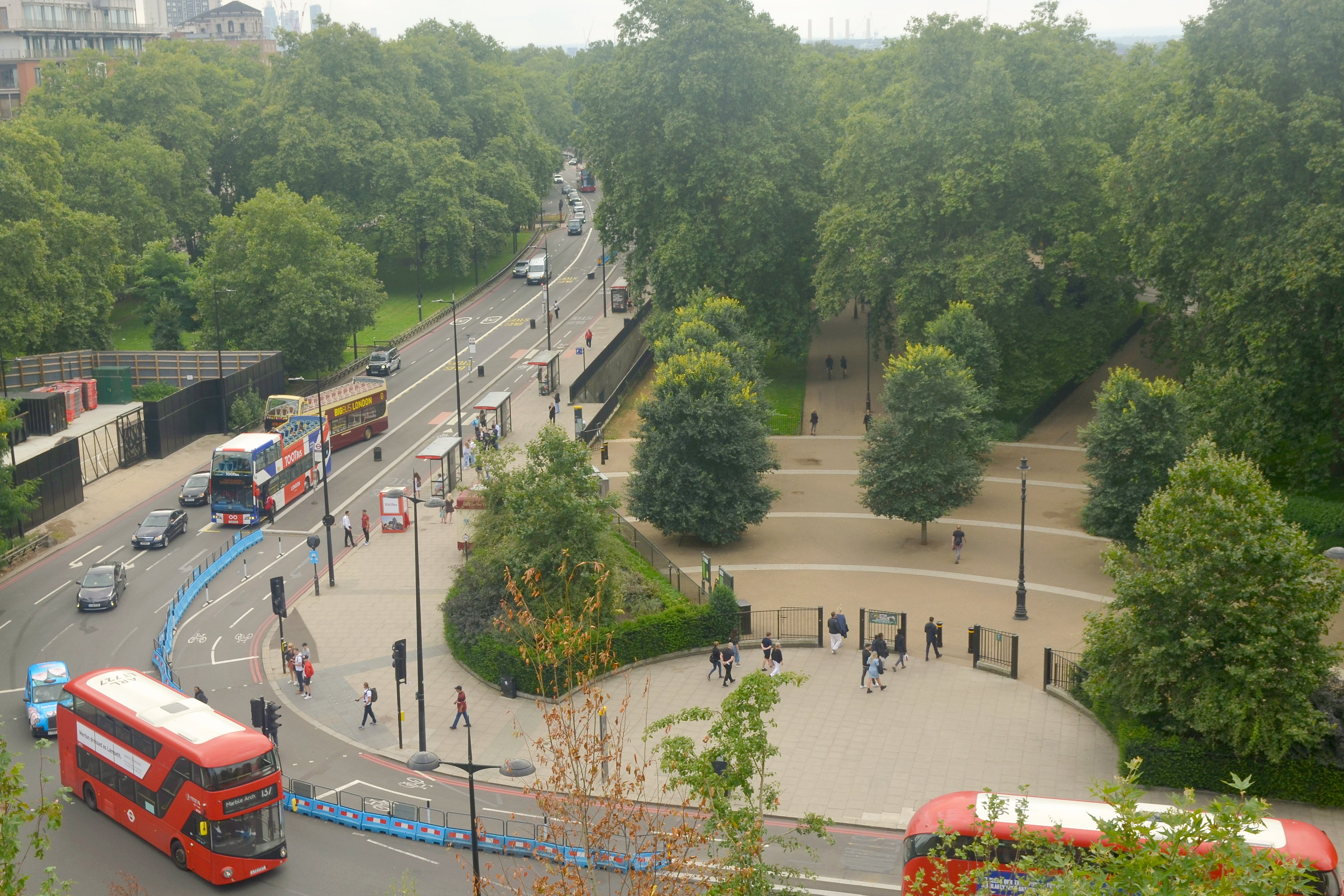

View of Hyde Park Speakers' Corner from Marble Arch Mound, August 2021

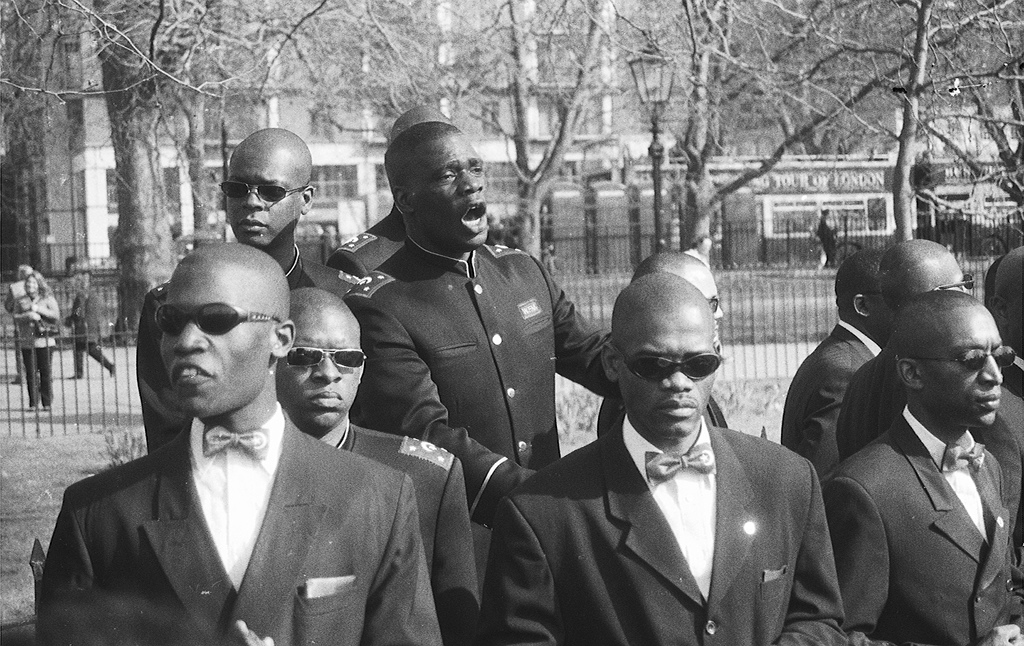
Nation of Islam member and former comedian Leo X Chester at Speakers' Corner, March 1999

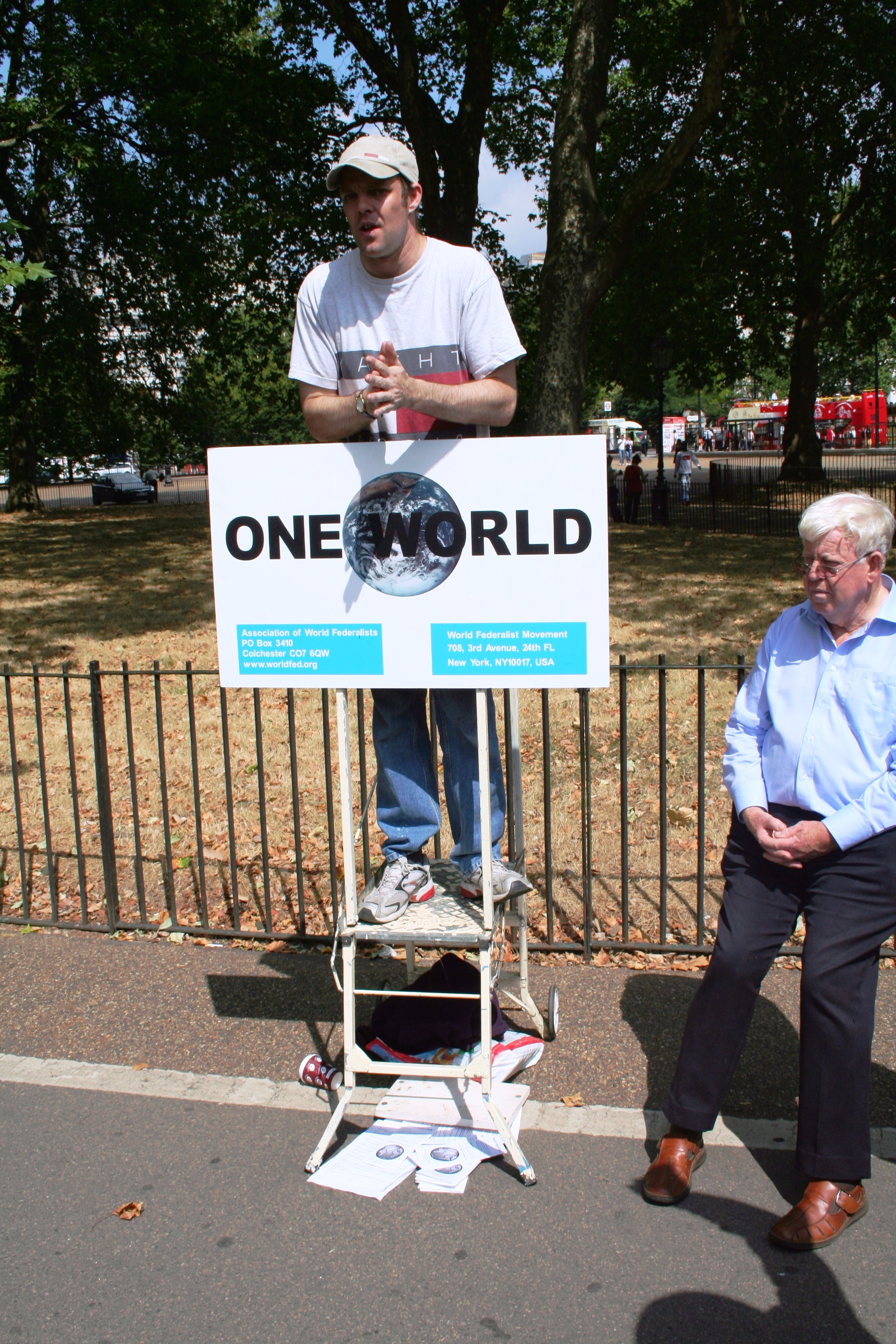
"One world" speaker supporting a world government, August 2006

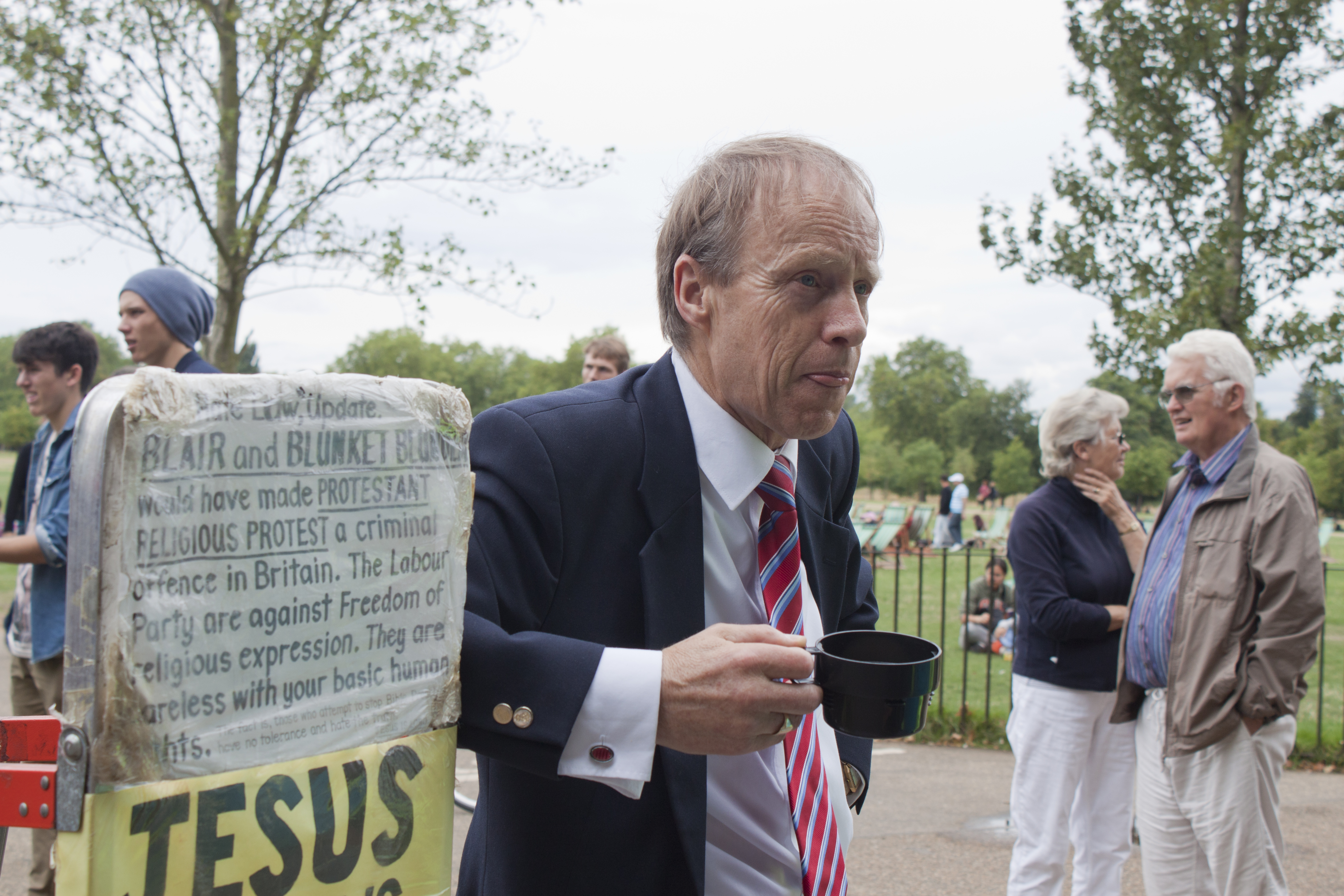
A Christian speaker at Speakers' Corner (2010)

Speakers here may talk on any subject, as long as the police consider their speeches lawful, although this right is not restricted to Speakers' Corner only. Contrary to popular belief, there is no immunity from the law, nor are any subjects proscribed, but in practice the police intervene only when they receive a complaint. On some occasions in the past, they have intervened on grounds of profanity.

Though Hyde Park Speakers' Corner is considered the paved area closest to Marble Arch, legally the public speaking area extends beyond the Reformers' Tree and covers a large area from Marble Arch to Victoria Gate, then along the Serpentine to Hyde Park Corner and the Broad Walk running from Hyde Park Corner to Marble Arch.

Public riots broke out in the park in 1855, in protest over the Sunday Trading Bill, which forbade buying and selling on a Sunday, the only day working people had off. The riots were described by Karl Marx as "the beginning of the English revolution".

The Chartist movement used Hyde Park as a point of assembly for popular protests, but no permanent speaking location was established. The Reform League organised a massive demonstration in 1866 and then again in 1867, which compelled the government to extend the franchise to include most working-class men.

Speakers' Corner is often held up to demonstrate freedom of speech, as anyone can turn up unannounced and talk on almost any subject, although always at the risk of being heckled by regulars. The corner was frequented by Karl Marx, Vladimir Lenin, George Orwell, C. L. R. James, Walter Rodney, Ben Tillett, Marcus Garvey, Kwame Nkrumah, and William Morris.

The Australian historian Henry Reynolds, who visited London in the early 1960s, noted the impression the corner had on him:

At Hyde Park Corner, race and colonialism were more commonly discussed than older concerns about class or religion. One morning we joined a crowd listening to an articulate and fiery young African man. To our embarrassment he was being heckled by a party of young Australians. Among other things they told him was that there was no racial prejudice in Australia because everyone there was equal. With that the speaker turned on the hecklers and launched a tirade about Australia's treatment of the Aborigines. He was probably better informed about the matter than were the Australians in his audience, myself included.

Lord Justice Sedley, in Redmond-Bate v Director of Public Prosecutions (1999), described Speakers' Corner as demonstrating "the tolerance which is both extended by the law to opinion of every kind and expected by the law in the conduct of those who disagree, even strongly, with what they hear." The ruling famously established in English case law that freedom of speech could not be limited to the inoffensive but extended also to "the irritating, the contentious, the eccentric, the heretical, the unwelcome, and the provocative, as long as such speech did not tend to provoke violence", and that the right to free speech accorded by Article 10 of the European Convention on Human Rights also accorded the right to be offensive. Prior to the ruling, prohibited speech at Speakers' Corner included obscenity, blasphemy, insulting the Monarch, or inciting a breach of the peace.

=== Notable speakers ===
The following organisations and individuals, listed here in alphabetical order, have (had) a well-established history of speaking regularly in Hyde Park.

- Tony Allen (since 1978)
- Jacques Arnold MP (see the Hyde Park Tories)
- Michael 'Lord' Barker (1970s, 1980s)
- Martin Besserman (since c. 1978)
- Michael Brotherton MP (see the Hyde Park Tories)
- Catholic Evidence Guild (since 1918)
- John Goss (see the Hyde Park Tories)
- Diane Hamilton (since 1980s)
- Christopher Horne (see the Hyde Park Tories)
- Jim Huggon (1970s, 1980s)
- The Hyde Park Tories (1966–1975) (Bryan Morgan-Edwards, John Goss, Michael Brotherton MP, Christopher Horne, Sir Ian MacTaggart, Jacques Arnold MP, William List and others)
- William List (see the Hyde Park Tories)
- Peter Lumsden (c. 1980–2007)
- Sir Ian MacTaggart (see the Hyde Park Tories)
- Vincent McNabb (c. 1920–43)
- Brian Morgan Edwards (see the Hyde Park Tories)
- Robert Ogilvie (1960s–1980s)
- Derek Prince (1970s)
- Barry Roberts (1970s–2000)
- Philip Sansom (1947–c. 1978)
- Norman "The Walker" Schlund (1960s–1980s)
- Frank Sheed (1921–c. 1970) (with Maisie Ward)
- Jay Smith (1990–2015)
- Socialist Party of Great Britain (since 1904)
- Donald Soper, Baron Soper (1950–c. 1995)
- Hatun Tash (since 2013)
- Bonar Thompson (1920–1960)
- Maisie Ward (1919-c. 1970) (with Frank Sheed)
- John Webster (1947–c. 1985)

== Outside London ==
=== Official ===
==== Southampton ====
Speakers Corner Southampton opened in 1971, with it first being used on the 27 November 1971 by an anti-apartheid group.

==== Nottingham ====
Speakers' Corner Nottingham was officially inaugurated by Jack Straw, then secretary of state for justice, on 22 February 2009. The designated space occupied a new landscaped extension to the city's Old Market Square, at the junction of King Street and Queen Street. The large paved space includes the new statue of Brian Clough, the former manager of Derby County and Nottingham Forest, who forged ties between the two cities which were famous for local rivalry.

==== Lichfield, Staffordshire ====
Speakers Corner Lichfield was launched in May 2009, with the help of the Speakers' Corner Trust, to much applause. Hundreds of people joined in the celebrations which featured more than 30 speeches, musical and dance performances, as well as appearances Chris Walker.

Today Speakers' Corner is a site for events and activities, as well as a destination for all the community to visit and have their say on topics close to their hearts.

Since the launch, a plaque has been unveiled at the site, along with a code of conduct. Plans for the site include a stone plaque marking the spot, as well as a series of annual events.

==== Worthing, West Sussex ====
The Sussex coastal town of Worthing has had its own Speakers' Corner at Splash Point on the town's seafront since the Victorian era. A sign today marks the "stand for delivering sermons and public speeches", while another sign close by marks the site by the old Fish Market where the Salvation Army has preached the Gospel since 1886. The Speakers' Corner fell into disuse in the late 20th century. As part of the Government's Sea Change programme, run by the Commission for Architecture and the Built Environment, the area benefited from a £500,000 grant to re-landscape the area around Splash Point including a revival of the Speakers' Corner. Work was completed early in 2011

=== Unofficial ===
==== Leeds ====
Leeds is known to have its own Speakers' Corner, at Victoria Gardens on the Headrow, in front of the Leeds City Art Gallery, Central Library and Henry Moore Sculpture Centre building. It is a pivotal point in Leeds for justice and anti-war marches, most of which gather and terminate here, as well as for war memorial services due to the location of Leeds's Municipal Cenotaph.

==== Newcastle ====
The stepped base of Grey's Monument is used as a stage by assorted musicians, preachers and activists.

==== Portsmouth ====
The steps of Guildhall, Portsmouth are often used for protest activity, speeches and activists.

== Other countries ==
=== Australia ===
There is a Speakers' Corner in The Domain, Sydney, established in 1878. The speakers talk every Sunday afternoon from 2 pm until 5 pm, and have a website. Official outdoor "free" speech first appeared in the hustings and hanging grounds of Hyde Park Sydney in 1874. Free speech in this form was banned following a serious riot between Catholics and Orangemen. However, following the formalisation of free speech in Speakers' Corner in London it was decided in 1878 that The Domain would be the place for free speech in Sydney.

In Diary of a Voyage to Australia, New Zealand and other lands (published 1896), the Christadelphian preacher Robert Roberts wrote: "On the west side [of a particular location] is a feature peculiar to Sydney in all the world – a preaching park. There are of course, parks in other cities where open-air spouting is practiced on Sundays, such as Hyde Park, in London : but there is no city in the world where a park on such a scale is used by all classes of religious people. It is a wooded enclosure, like a nobleman's park in England, kept in capital order, both as regards the turf under foot, and the tall and noble trees that give shelter overhead from the sun." "All the sects and denominations use it. There is none of the sense of infra dig that associates itself with out-door preaching in England.""Every denomination has its own tree." "The various religious bodies hold their meetings sufficiently apart to make no interference one with the other. It is a sort of weekly babel of religious tongues – recognised and patronised by the whole community"

Other Speakers' Corners are found in Brisbane outside Parliament House, and in King George Square. In Melbourne, Speakers' Corner was originally held in Birrarung Marr where the original site is still visible. This site has lost some popularity over the years and Speakers' Corner (Now called "Speakers' Forum") is currently held outside the State Library of Victoria on Sunday afternoon from 3 pm.

=== Canada ===
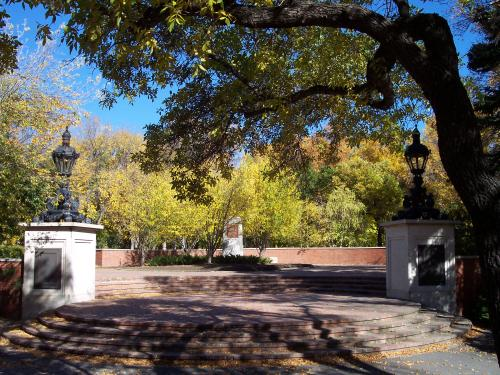
Speakers' Corner in Regina, Saskatchewan

Dedicated by the Earl Mountbatten on 12 April 1966, Speakers' Corner in Regina, Saskatchewan is located on the north shore of Wascana Lake. It serves as a constant reminder of the notion of free speech and assembly and a tribute to Saskatchewan people who have upheld that heritage. The two lanterns framing the south entrance to the main plaza formed part of the Cumberland Screen at the entrance to Speakers' Corner in London. The podia on the main plaza are from the exterior columns of the Old City Hall (1908–1965) and symbolise free speech in democracy at the municipal level of government. Six paper birch trees were taken from Runnymede Meadow in Windsor Great Park, near Windsor Castle. It was there that King John signed Magna Carta on 15 June 1215. The ten gas lamps surrounding the corner come from King Charles Street which runs from Whitehall to St. James Park, London, near the Houses of Parliament. They were erected in 1908 during the reign of Edward VII, whose royal cypher E.R. VII appears on the base of each lamp.

Kitchener, Ontario has a small area designated as a Speakers' Corner on the northwest corner of King and Benton Street. It has existed since the mid-1980s.

=== Hong Kong ===
The City Forum, a public forum was held weekly on Sunday in Victoria Park's Bandstand. The forum brought together politicians, academics and prominent public figures to discuss current issues, and also allowed the public to participate in a Q&A session. Each week, a number of secondary schools were invited to bring pupils to the forum to ask questions. The forum was broadcast live on RTHK TV 31 and was also sometimes held in other locations across Hong Kong such as Centenary Garden and Morse Park as well as across different university campuses. The forum ended on 18 July 2021.

=== Indonesia ===
Mass demonstration and speeches are traditionally held on the Hotel Indonesia roundabout Selamat Datang Monument. This venue however, is located the middle of Jakarta's main boulevard and commercial district, thus causing a severe traffic jam when a rally is held. To accommodate this, Jakarta's provincial government built a small park on the northwestern corner of the Merdeka Square, across the Istana Merdeka, Indonesia's presidential palace. Officially named 'Taman Pandang Istana' (Palace-View Park), this park is known commonly as 'Taman Unjuk Rasa' (Demonstration Park).

=== Italy ===
As a tribute to democracy and freedom of speech, in Lajatico, Pisa, there a small area designated as Speakers' Corner ("L'angolo del parlatore") on a corner of the Vittorio Veneto main square. It is opened for the public to speak on Sundays (9 to 11 a.m. and 4 to 6 p.m.). The first speaker was the mayor Alessio Barbarfieri, who highlighted the importance of the acts of speaking and listening for a good and effective local governance. Since the Roman age, there is the "Statua del Pasquino", a sculpture in Rome where everyone can attach anonymous criticism in written form; similar thing happens with Toni Rioba statue in Venice.

=== Malaysia ===
The first Speakers' Square in Malaysia was established at the Esplanade, George Town, Penang on 4 May 2010. It is opened for the public to speak on Wednesday and Sunday (6.00 pm to 10.00 pm). The first speaker was Tan Seng Hai who shared his views on preventing Ascot Sports Sdn. Bhd. from conducting betting activities in the Penang state.

Conditions for use of Speakers' Square

- All speakers are prohibited from using loudspeakers, megaphones, or any other public address system
- Anyone who uses the Speakers' Square to make speeches does so at his or her own risk
- The Penang State Government and the City Council of Penang Island will not be responsible for any prosecution or legal action by the Police or civil proceedings

=== Netherlands ===
In the Netherlands, there is a permanently designated speakers' corner called the Spreeksteen in Amsterdam. Lawfully, every person has the freedom of speech as a matter of right. The 'Spreeksteen' is open for free speech 24-hours a day, and was established to allow complete free speech. The 'Spreeksteen' has been located in the Oosterpark in Amsterdam since 5 May 2005, and has been erected by a citizens action after the brutal murder of film-maker and columnist Theo van Gogh. Plans for bringing the Amsterdam Speakers' Corner online with a permanent camera and microphone are in a phase of installation. In the meantime the speakers are filmed with a hand-held camera.

On 1 October 2006, Michiel Smit, a far-right activist, spoke at the Spreeksteen. Antifascist demonstrators counter-protested, using noise to disrupt the speech.

=== New Zealand ===
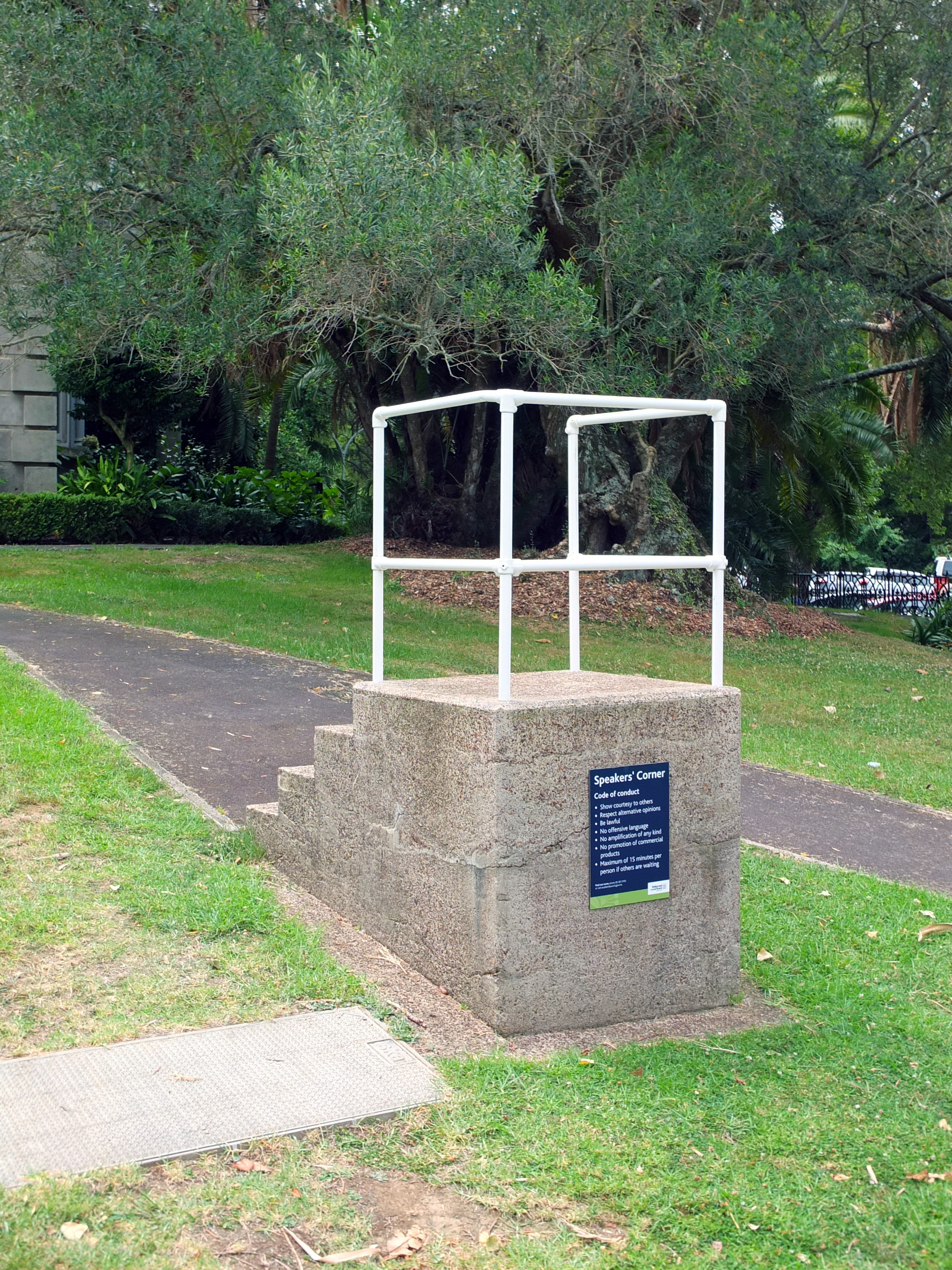
Speakers' Corner in Auckland

There is a Speakers' Corner in Albert Park in Auckland at Princes Street, opposite to the University of Auckland.

=== Singapore ===
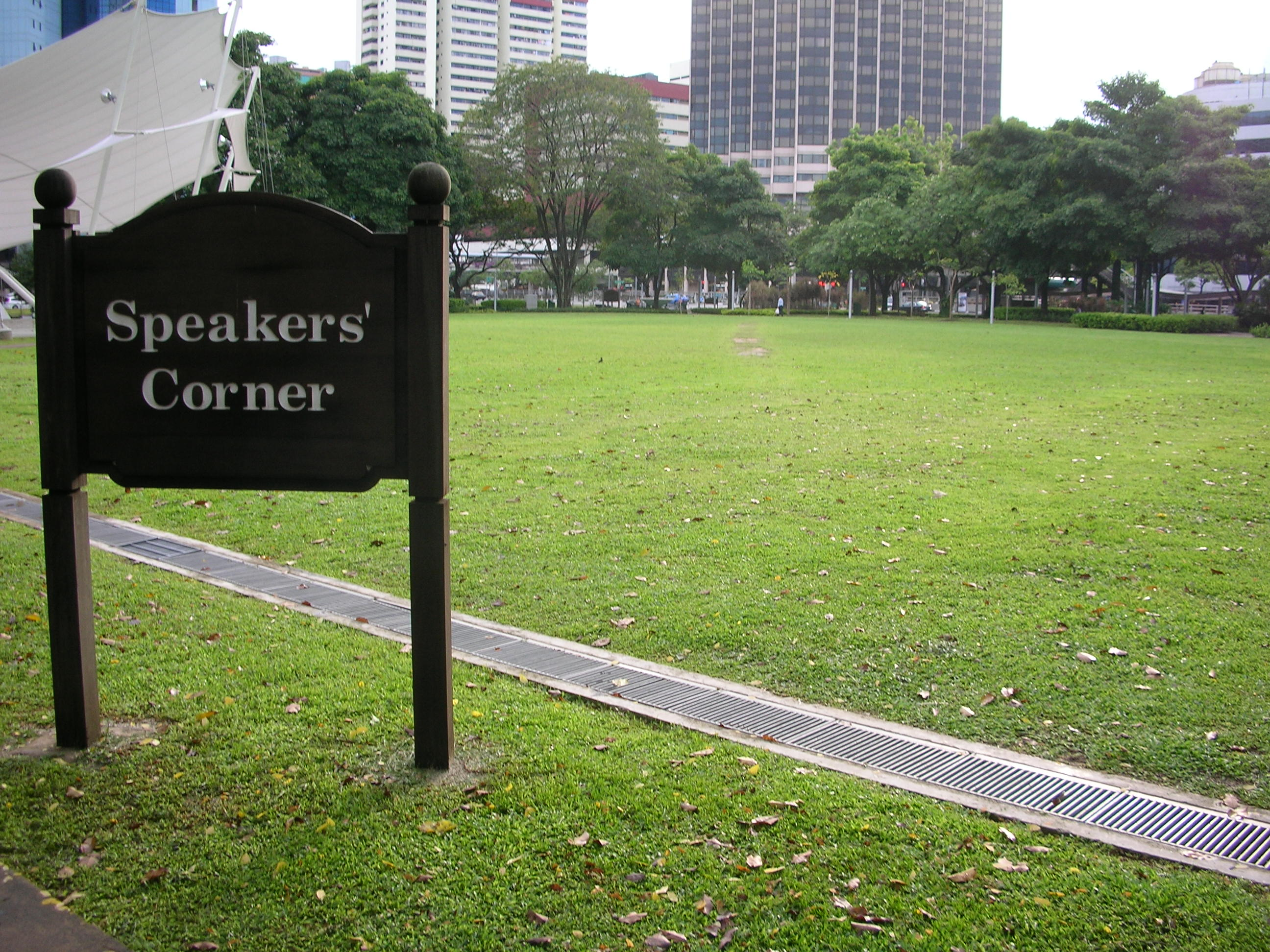
An empty Speakers' Corner in Singapore

The Speakers' Corner in Singapore was opened on 1 September 2000, to allow Singapore citizens to speak freely. They are exempted from the need to obtain a police permit as long as they meet the terms and conditions of use.

The Speakers' Corner is located in Hong Lim Park, a popular venue for many election rallies and political speeches in the 1950s and '60s. Hong Lim Park is centrally located, well-served by public transport and is sited in a high public density area.

In 2004, public exhibitions and performances were added to the list of exempted activities at the Speakers' Corner.

From 1 September 2008, Singapore citizens can also organise or participate in demonstrations at Speakers' Corner without having to obtain a police permit. With this latest change in policy to allow the venue to be used freely as an outdoor demonstration site, coupled with the liberalisation on the use of sound amplification and the extension of operating hours of the venue, the Speakers' Corner aims to address the genuine desire by some Singaporeans for lawful outdoor demonstrations and processions as a means of political expression.

Singapore citizens who wish to hold a speech, exhibition/performance or demonstration at the Speakers' Corner can register with the National Parks Board, which manages Hong Lim Park. Online registration is available on the website.

=== Thailand ===
An area was set up in Bangkok in the 1930s, and quickly became known as Hyde Park, to enable freedom of speech and the airing of political views in Thailand. The area was shut down after student rioting and the lethal intervention of the army and it is not discussed openly today.

In 1955, Marshal Plaek Pibulsonggram had visited London as part of an international tour. He became impressed with the "Speakers' Corner" in Hyde Park. Upon his return to Thailand a "Hyde Park" space for free speech and assembly was instituted at the Phramane Grounds in Bangkok. The experiment was well received and effectively stimulated political debate. The experiment was not appreciated by the government though, and in February 1956 restrictions were imposed on the Phramane "Hyde Park". However, during this period the Hyde Park Movement Party had evolved, upholding the legacy of the Hyde Park experiment.

=== Trinidad and Tobago ===
Woodford Square in Port of Spain, Trinidad, is also known as "The University of Woodford Square", so named by the first prime minister of Trinidad Eric Williams, who gave many speeches here. Another nickname, "People's Parliament", comes from the Black Power movement of the 1970s. Flanked by Trinidad's Parliament and Halls of Justice the Square still plays host to speeches of a highly topical and political nature.

In the southeast corner of the square, a blackboard lists the day's discussion as well as other important information. The speakers' topics are divided by interest and known as "classes".

=== United States ===
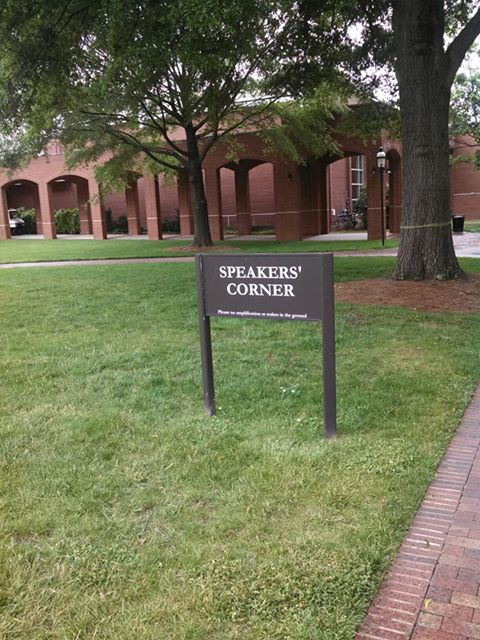
Elon University's Speakers Corner

Tom L. Johnson, the radical reforming Mayor of Cleveland (1901–1909), dedicated the north-west quadrant of Public Square to free speech, as in Hyde Park. Speeches and meetings there were common in the early part of the century; Anarchist Emma Goldman addressed a large crowd there in 1908. Today the site remains the traditional place for rallies and demonstrations in Cleveland, around Mayor Johnson's statue.

The University of California at Berkeley had a free speech area in front of Sproul Plaza until 1964. The University of Missouri hosts a speakers' corner, referred to as "Speaker's Circle". There are only two such locations in the entire state of Missouri.

As a result of winter semesters visits to England and Hyde Park, Elon University created a Speakers' Corner on campus. No persons from outside the university may speak without a permit. Students are free to speak at any time as long as they don't use amplification, do not disrupt others, do not damage property and do not cause dangerous conditions.

Bughouse Square in Washington Square Park, Chicago, was known as a free speech site from the 1910s to the 1960s.

The pedestrian-only area of Pennsylvania Avenue on the north side of the White House in Washington, D.C. has become a de facto speakers' corner. Consistent with the principles of the First Amendment, ad hoc public speaking is generally legal in all public places in Washington DC, although organised demonstrations require police permits.

Inspired by Speakers' Corner, Karl Dean, the Mayor of Nashville, designated a space for live music in the southwest corner of Centennial Park (Nashville), calling it Musicians Corner. A free concert series of the same name takes place in this space each year.

== Books and articles ==
- Unfinished Business (1964) by Maisie Ward, the story of her and Frank Sheed's meeting at Speaker's Corner, and the Catholic Evidence Guild.
- The Instructed Heart: Soundings at Four Depths (1979) by Frank Sheed, telling his side of the story of him and Maisie Ward and their lives as outdoor speakers.
- A Summer in the Park – A Journal of Speakers' Corner (2004) by Tony Allen, foreword by Ken Campbell
- The Speakers (1964) by Heathcote Williams. The book features William MacGuinness, Axel Ney Hoch, John Webster, Jacobus van Dyn, Norman Schlund, Alfred Reynolds and other Speakers' Corner regulars from the 1960s
- Hyde Park Orator. Autobiographical reminiscences (1933) by Bonar Thompson. With a portrait. Foreword by Seán O'Casey
- Speakers' Corner – an anthology (1977) Edited by Jim Huggon. With a foreword by Philip Sansom.
- But Mr Speaker, It Would Create Anarchy! (c. 1975) by Jim Huggon
- Bonar Thompson, the Old Days of Carnearney: An Examination of the Life and Times of Bonar Thompson, the Hyde Park Orator (1991) by R. H. Foy
- Around the Marble Arch. Wit and Humour of the Hyde Park Orators (1939) by F. W. Batchelor
- The History of Soapbox Oratory: Part One: Prominent Speakers of the Sydney Domain (1994) by Stephen Maxwell
- Speakers' Corner: The Conceptualisation and Regulation of a Public Sphere (2000) by J. M. Roberts. Dissertation, University of Cardiff.
- Roberts, John Michael. 2008. "Expressive free speech, the state and the public sphere: a Bakhtinian-Deleuzian analysis of 'public address' at Hyde Park". Social Movement Studies: Journal of Social, Cultural and Political Protest. 7:2 (September 2008), pp. 101–119.
- From Where I Stand (Hansib, 1987) by Roy Sawh
- A Saint in Hyde Park: Memories of Father Vincent McNabb, O. P. (1950) by Edward A Siderman
- Wer andern eine Rede hält – Speakers Corner London (1981) by K. H. Wocker, photographs by J. D. Schmidt
- Answering Back. Donald Soper answers your questions (1953) by Donald Soper
- The Domain Speaker. Humour, Politics, Satire, Revolution, Human Rights, Historical, Pictorial, Vicious Wit (1981) by Victor Zammit
- Stilled Tongues: From Soapbox to Soundbite (1997) by Stephen Coleman
- The Future of Ideas: The Fate of the Commons in a Connected World (2001) by Lawrence Lessig
- 'Only in London': Speakers' Corner, Marble Arch. Past, Present, and Future (if any). An illustrated sourcebook (2010) by Reinhard Wentz
- Speaker's Corner Teacher Guide. KS3 History and Citizenship (2011) [Produced by The Royal Parks(Agency)] 22 pp
- "Speakers' Corner: Where all speech reigns free" (2017)

== Media references ==
- Bill Maher appeared at the Speakers' Corner in Hyde Park, London, impersonating a Scientologist while filming his 2008 comedy/documentary film Religulous.
- BBC 3 produced a program with Tony Allen on heckling as a lost art for the election in 2005. It was based around teaching two people how to heckle at Speakers' Corner.
- Episode 24 of Season 6 of the comedy TV series Married... with Children had the Bundy family paying a visit to Speakers' Corner.
- In Omen III: The Final Conflict, the adult Damien passes through Speakers' Corner, hears a priest there speaking of the Antichrist, and looks uneasy as the priest seems to recognise him.
- Karl Pilkington interviews a man who regularly attends Speakers' Corner, claiming to have discovered "the secret to eternal youth". The interview is an extra, featured on Ricky Gervais's DVD entitled FAME.
- Speakers' Corner appears in one of the early issues of the Grant Morrison comic book The Invisibles (later reprinted in the first Invisibles graphic novel, Say You Want A Revolution).
- The BBC produced a program on the Park Police.
- The lyrics of British rock group Dire Straits' song "Industrial Disease" (from the Love Over Gold album) refer to Speakers' Corner: "I go down to Speakers' Corner, I'm thunderstruck; they got free speech, tourists, police in trucks. Two men say they're Jesus; one of them must be wrong. There's a protest singer, he's singing a protest song".
- In Episode 3 season 1 of BBC's The Speaker, contestants have to speak at Speakers' Corner to prove their public speaking skills.
- In Half a Life: A Novel by V. S. Naipaul, the main character, visiting London for the first time, expects to see large, radical, excited crowds at Speakers' Corner. Instead he encounters "an idle scatter of people around half a dozen talkers, with the big buses and the cars rolling indifferently by all the time" and speakers with odd, "very personal religious ideas," such that their families "might have been glad to get them out of the house in the afternoons."
- Graham Bond song "Strange Time, Sad Time" from his album "Love Is the Law" (Pulsar 1969) contains the lyric "In London England, people take a walk... Great Times, Love Times... to Speakers Corner to tell their talk... Great Times, Love Times
- Italian filmmaker Nanni Moretti references the Speakers Corner in his semi-autobiographical 1998 film April, imagining himself on a stepladder rambling about Italy's left wing fate after the dissolution of the Soviet Union and kindergartens in Emilia-Romagna.

== See also ==
- Free speech zone
