= James Horn =

James or Jim Horn may refer to:

- James Horn (politician) (1855–1932), New Zealand politician
- James T. Horn (born 1966), American country music singer
- Jim Horn (born 1940), American musician
- Jim Horn (politician), American politician in the Washington State Senate
- James Horn, author of A Land as God Made It, see Jamestown, Virginia

== See also ==
- James Horne (disambiguation)
