= Jim Horne (neuroscientist) =

James Anthony Horne (April 1946 - October 2023) was a British sleep neuroscientist and emeritus professor of psychophysiology at the School of Sport, Exercise and Health Sciences at Loughborough University. He was a regular commentator in the British media on the subject of sleep.
