= Richard Topus =

American pigeon enthusiast and business executive

Richard Topus (1924–2008) was an American pigeon enthusiast and business executive. During World War II he trained war pigeons for the United States Army.

== Biography ==
Topus was born in Brooklyn, New York on March 15, 1924. He grew up in Flatbush where he fell in love with pigeons at an early age and befriended several local pigeon handlers who taught him to handle the birds. In 1942 he enlisted in the United States Army Signal Corps as a pigeoneer. He was stationed at Camp Ritchie in Maryland - one of several camps where birds were raised and trained for use as messengers. He taught other soldiers how to train and care for carrier pigeons, how to fasten on the tiny capsules containing messages written on lightweight paper, to drop pigeons from airplanes; and to jump out of airplanes themselves, with pigeons tucked against their chests.

After the war Topus earned a master's degree from Hofstra University. In the late 1950s he joined Friendship Food Products, a dairy company based in Maspeth, Queens (which would later become Friendship Dairies, a subsidiary of Dean Foods), eventually rising to the position of executive vice president for sales and marketing. In 1948 he married Jacqueline Buehler.

After leaving Friendship Food Products he taught marketing at Long Island University and then at the State University of New York in the 1960s and early 1970s. After retiring to Scottsdale he taught at Arizona State University and worked as a securities arbitrator.

He died at the age of 84 on December 5, 2008 in Scottsdale, Arizona of kidney failure. His son David Topus is an American businessman and author of "Talk To Strangers" published by Wiley.
