= Brian Morgan Edwards =

Welsh businessman and politician (1934-2002)

Brian Morgan Edwards (August 1934 – December 2002) was a Welsh businessman and politician who sponsored the first Welsh-language recording studio for popular music. He was described as a political "maverick".

Edwards was born in Swansea and won a place at the London School of Economics, where he was a joint founder of the Tankard Club, a dining club for LSE graduates. His first job was as a computer salesman with IBM, and he soon won success in that field. In 1961 he was appointed lead salesman for a new computer system which used a novel small-sized punched card and was designed for the smaller business. By spending his weekends driving around the industrial estates of west London, and on Monday mornings presenting a list of company names to his secretary, he rapidly built up a strong following of prospective customers.

He met his wife Rona, who like himself was a native of Wales, whilst they were both living in London, and soon after their marriage the pair moved back to their native land, eventually settling in Pwllheli on the Llŷn Peninsula. Morgan Edwards had been a vociferous supporter of the Conservative Party, at the time of the Harold Macmillan government and the 1964 General Election, which brought Harold Wilson into government for the first time. The Sunday after that general election, he took over (by consent) a Communist party stand at Speaker's Corner at Hyde Park Corner and announced "Welcome to the first meeting of Hyde Park Tories – we will speak here every Sunday until the Conservatives are returned to power". The Hyde Park Tories, including John Goss, Michael Brotherton, William List, Christopher Horne, and others, became a leading campaign organisation inside the Conservative Party. The combination of marriage to Rona and residence in Wales turned Edwards into a fervent Welsh Nationalist, and he supported that cause for many years. He was the Plaid Cymru parliamentary candidate for the Cardiff North constituency at the 1970 general election.

In pursuance of his Welsh patriotic interest, in 1969 he supported the formation of the first Welsh language record label, Sain, in partnership with the Welsh singers Dafydd Iwan and Huw Jones. Morgan Edwards and Dafydd Iwan were also involved in setting up Cymdeithas Tai Gwynedd, the first rural Housing Association in Wales, a charity providing affordable housing for people in need, especially the elderly and young low-income families.

In 1976, Edwards, then party treasurer, was part of a four-man Plaid Cymru delegation which visited Libya to study the building of schools and hospitals. It was later alleged that the visit had led to a £25,000 donation to Plaid Cymru by Colonel Gaddafi, Plaid Cymru rejected the allegation.

Brian Morgan Edwards died in December 2002, and his wife Rona, President of the Welsh Bridge Union and Chairman of the North Wales Bridge Association, died only a month later in January 2003.

== Sources ==
- Sain website
