= Christopher Richardson (Deputy Lieutenant) =

Christopher Richardson (born 25 June (O.S.) 1752 - 26 April 1825) was a justice of the peace and Deputy Lieutenant of the North Riding of Yorkshire.

== Early life and family ==
Christopher Richardson was born on 25 June 1752, the eldest son of Christopher Richardson of Whitby, by Catherine, his second wife. He married Mary Holt (died 6 March 1840) on 15 February 1779, the youngest daughter of John Holt of Whitby.

== Career ==
He was a justice of the peace and Deputy Lieutenant of the North Riding of Yorkshire.

== Death ==
Richardson died on 26 April 1825.
