= Death of Ophélie Bretnacher =

2008 death of a French student in Budapest, Hungary

Ophélie Bretnacher
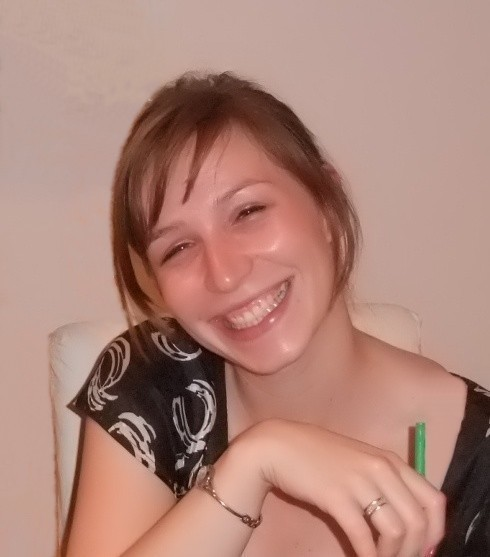
- Bretnacher, c. 2008
- Born: 8 June 1986; Verdun, France
- Disappeared: 4 December 2008
- Died: 4 December 2008 (aged 22); Budapest, Hungary
- Body discovered: Csepel, Hungary
- Known for: Death by disputed causes. Possible accidental death, death by misadventure or murder

On December 4, 2008, Ophélie Bretnacher, a French exchange student in Budapest, Hungary, left a nightclub. Video footage showed her walking down several local streets afterwards; she was never seen alive again and her body was found in the Danube two months later. Authorities have not conclusively decided what caused her death and closed the case in 2014. Her family and government believe she may have been killed and have pressed for the case to be reopened.

== Background ==
Ophélie Bretnacher was a French exchange student participating in the Erasmus Programme. She disappeared in Budapest, Hungary on December 4, 2008. CCTV cameras were able to track part of her route, determining that she left a nightclub called Portside of Cuba. The footage shows her walking from Dohány Street to Deák Square, up to the Széchenyi Chain Bridge, and across the Danube. The CCTV footage has since been uploaded to YouTube.

Investigations revealed that she left Portside of Cuba, the nightclub, after having celebrated Saint Nicholas Day with friends. She was walking in the direction of her home. Her handbag, which contained her mobile phone among other personal belongings, was found later that evening on the Széchenyi Chain Bridge by two Italian students. Her closest friends and her host family, concerned for her whereabouts, contacted her family the following day.

Friends and family members made many attempts to locate her. An official investigation was opened in Hungary, followed shortly afterward by one in France. Two months later, in February 2009, her body was discovered in Csepel, an island in the Danube.

== Investigation ==
After the discovery of Bretnacher's body, Hungarian authorities assigned a seven-member police team to investigate the case. The police said that suicide or an accident were the likely causes of her death. However, homicide was also considered a possibility, because a hematoma was found on her body and there were many gray areas during the investigation. One fact contributing to the dispute over her cause of death was that her body was found upstream.

In February 2010, her family filed a new claim for murder.

In March 2010, a judicial inquiry was opened in Paris for kidnapping, unlawful confinement and murder. By 2014, authorities in Hungary were prepared to close the case, considering the investigation deadline was set to expire in February of that year. New information reportedly surfaced, prompting the Budapest prosecutor's office to continue the inquiry. Sources say that the investigation resumed due to inconsistencies in the testimonies of the interrogated witnesses.

The Hungarian investigation was closed in 2014.

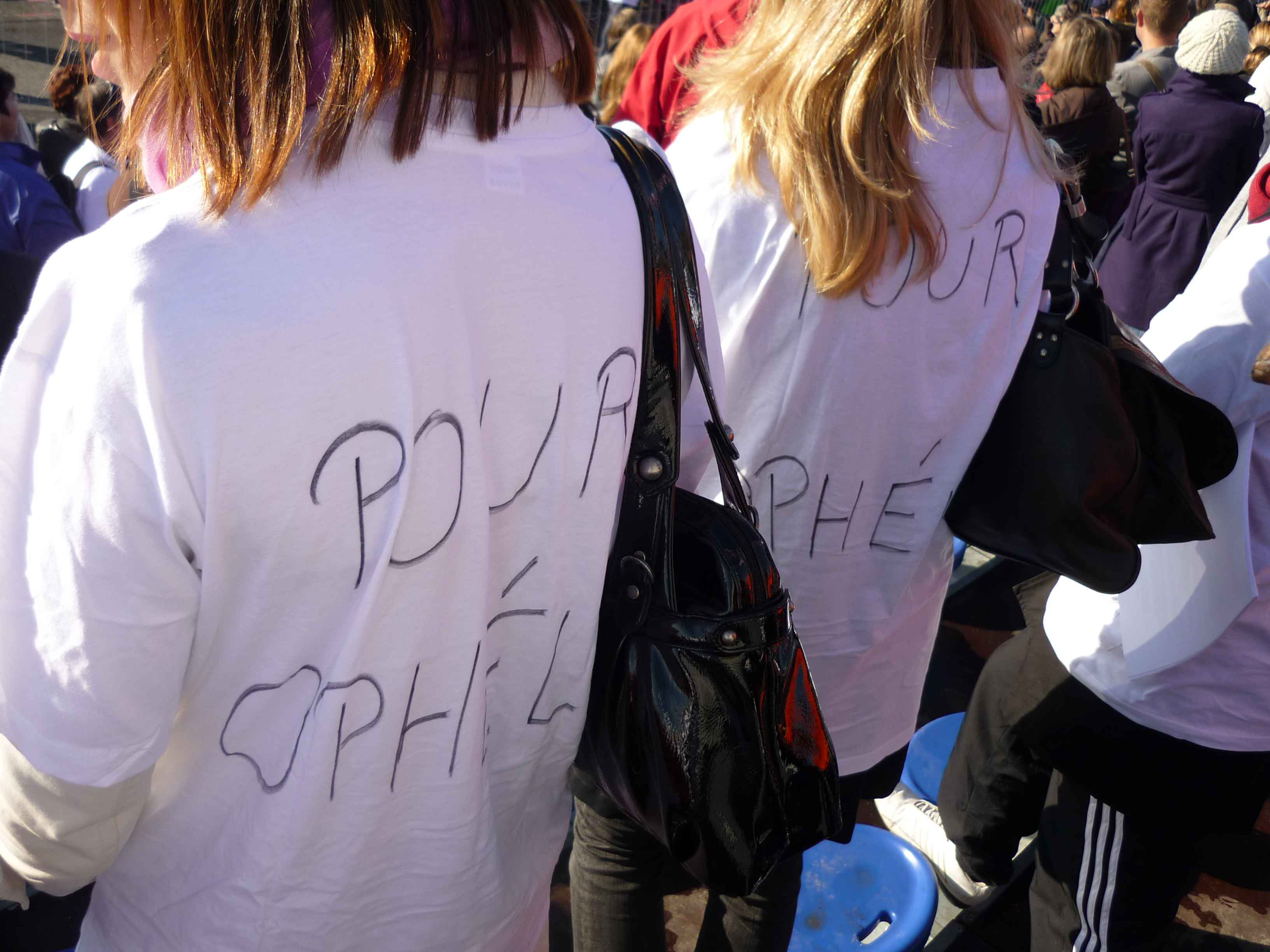

== Political and diplomatic consequences ==
While Hungarian police concluded that the case could either be a suicide or accidental drowning, in France there was public clamour for a more thorough investigation. An online petition has been signed by over 10,000 people and was sent to the French President. On January 11, 2009, several hundred people marched silently in a white march, from the Champ-de-Mars, near the Eiffel Tower, to encourage the involvement of the French authorities.

French politicians also expressed interest in continuing the investigation, including Catherine Vautrin, the Vice-Président of the National Assembly. Following this intervention, French investigators were sent to Hungary for a second time.

== See also ==
- List of solved missing person cases (2000s)
- List of unsolved deaths
