= William Glendon =

American politician

- Born: c. 1920; Medford, Massachusetts, U.S.
- Died: December 25, 2008 (aged 89); White Plains, New York, U.S.
- Education: College of the Holy Cross (BA); Georgetown University (LLB)
- Known for: Representing The Washington Post in the Pentagon Papers case

William R. Glendon (c. 1920 – December 25, 2008) was an American attorney who specialized in issues relating to the First Amendment to the United States Constitution and represented The Washington Post in the Pentagon Papers case.

== Early life and education ==
Glendon was born in Medford, Massachusetts, and grew up in Stoneham, Massachusetts. He attended the College of the Holy Cross and enlisted in the United States Navy in 1941 following graduation. He served on a troop transport ship as a communications officer and earned five battle stars for his participation in the amphibious invasions of North Africa, Italy and the Normandy Landings. He left the Navy with the rank of lieutenant.

== Career ==
After ending his military service, he attended the Georgetown Law School, graduating in 1947. He served as an assistant district attorney in Washington, D.C., and joined the firm of Rogers & Wells (now part of Clifford Chance), and relocated to the firm's Manhattan office in 1956.

In 1971, the Nixon Administration sought to suppress publication of the Pentagon Papers, a top-secret history prepared by the United States Department of Defense documenting American political and military involvement in Vietnam from 1945 to 1967, citing claims that publication of the classified material could cause irreparable injury to the national interest. On this basis court injunctions were issued to prevent publication of the material in these documents by The New York Times and The Washington Post.

Together with Alexander M. Bickel who was serving as chief counsel for The Times, Glendon appeared before the Supreme Court of the United States in New York Times Co. v. United States to argue that the government should not be allowed to exercise prior restraint to prevent publication. Glendon argued in a response to Justice Byron R. White that "when you bring a case you are supposed to prove it, and when you come in claiming irreparable injury, particularly in this area of the First Amendment, you have a very, very heavy burden." The court, by a 6-to-3 majority, agreed.

In the 1977 securities fraud case Santa Fe Industries Inc. v. Green, Glendon successfully argued that a party challenging a securities transaction permitted under state law must prove fraudulent deception and not just a breach of fiduciary responsibility.

Glendon was elected as mayor of Scarsdale, New York in 1985. After a group of residents objected to a Nativity scene that had been displayed on municipal property by a private group as a violation of the Establishment Clause of the First Amendment, the village trustees voted to prohibit its display. Glendon personally supported the crèche, but acting as the village's attorney he argued on behalf of the ban in a series of court cases. In 1985, the Supreme Court voted 4 to 4 with a ninth judge absent, keeping intact the reversal of the decision by the United States Court of Appeals which ruled that the village's ban amounted to an unconstitutional infringement on "religious speech", and allowing the crèche to be displayed after a five-year gap.

== Personal life ==
A resident of Scarsdale and Fishers Island, Glendon died at age 89 on December 25, 2008, in White Plains, New York.
