= Alan W. Lear =

Scottish writer

Alan William Lear (26 October 1953 – 26 December 2008) was a Scottish writer of science fiction and horror, whose credits included the 1984 BBC Radio 4 play Why Not Take All of Me?

== History ==
Lear wrote four plays for the Audio Visuals series of amateur-produced Doctor Who stories in the 1980s entitled Enclave Irrelative (which featured Michael Wisher as "Maul"), Minuet in Hell (again featuring Wisher, this time as Lord Sandwich), Cloud Of Fear and Planet Of Lies (developed from an original scenario by Jim Mortimore). The latter saw the destruction of Gallifrey and the Time Lords by the Daleks many years before the 2005 revival of Doctor Who did something similar, but long after the BBC Books range destroyed Gallifrey. He was also the writer behind Audio Visuals' first foray into video production with the little seen drama Scarecrow City, starring Nicholas Briggs as Arthur Mowbray and Liz Knight as Penny dealing with unusual behaviour in the city of Pastonmouth.

After being struck down with glandular fever in 1976, Lear suffered from chronic fatigue syndrome for the remainder of his life, which severely affected his opportunities to advance his writing.

When asked in 2001 to contribute a new version of Minuet in Hell for Big Finish Productions' range of audio dramas featuring Paul McGann as the Eighth Doctor, Lear extensively rewrote the play but due to the demands of the recording schedule producer Gary Russell completed the final episodes of the script and took a co-writer's credit. A further story by Lear for Big Finish, Riders Of The Vortex, was abandoned due to creative differences with Gary Russell.

Lear died on Boxing Day 2008, aged 55.
