= Renato Romagnoli =

Italian university professor and medical surgeon

- Born: January 31, 1966 (age 60); Turin, Italy
- Education: University of Turin
- Occupations: Surgeon; Educator
- Years active: Since 1990
- Known for: Liver and pancreas transplantations
- Scientific career
- Workplaces: University of Turin, AOU Città della Salute e della Scienza

Renato Romagnoli (Turin, Italy, 31 January 1966) is an Italian surgeon and university professor, who is a specialist in liver transplantation, general surgery, and hepatobiliary surgery.

He is a professor of general surgery at the University of Turin, and director of the Dipartimento Chirurgia Generale e Specialistica e dei Trapianti. He has held leadership positions in the transplant services of the Città della Salute e della Scienza di Torino, including the liver and pancreas transplant programmes.

== Education and career ==
Romagnoli graduated in medicine from the University of Turin in 1990 and completed his specialization in general surgery in 1995. From 1994 to 1997, he undertook fellowship training in digestive and transplant surgery at the Catholic University of Leuven in Belgium. He afterwards worked at the liver transplant centre of Turin's Molinette Hospital, becoming an associate professor at the University of Turin in December 2010.

In June 2019, his medical team carried out a rare liver transplant using normothermic machine perfusion, in a technique that allowed a donor liver to be assessed and maintained at body temperature before transplantation.

In November 2018, he succeeded Mauro Salizzoni as head of the university's General Surgery 2 unit at the Città della Salute e della Scienza di Torino, with responsibility for regional liver and pancreas transplant programmes. In July 2024, he became director of the hospital's Transplant Department. In July 2025, he became director of the Surgery and Transplantation Department of the same hospital.

Up to date, the medical team of Romagnoli, under his leadership, has carried out several complex and emergency liver transplantations, performing life-saving procedures for patients with acute liver failure and severe liver diseases.

== Research ==
Romagnoli's research has focused primarily on liver transplantation in adult and paediatric patients, pancreatic transplantation, hepatobiliary and pancreatic surgery, and machine perfusion of donor livers.

His research publications have covered topics related to transplantation techniques, organ-donor selection, and also, approaches to expand the use of donor organs. Until October 2026, his total published work exceeded the number of 465 publications, which have gathered more than 10,000 citations at Google Scholar.
