= Jay Smith (Christian apologist) =

American polemicist (born 1953)

Dr Jay Smith
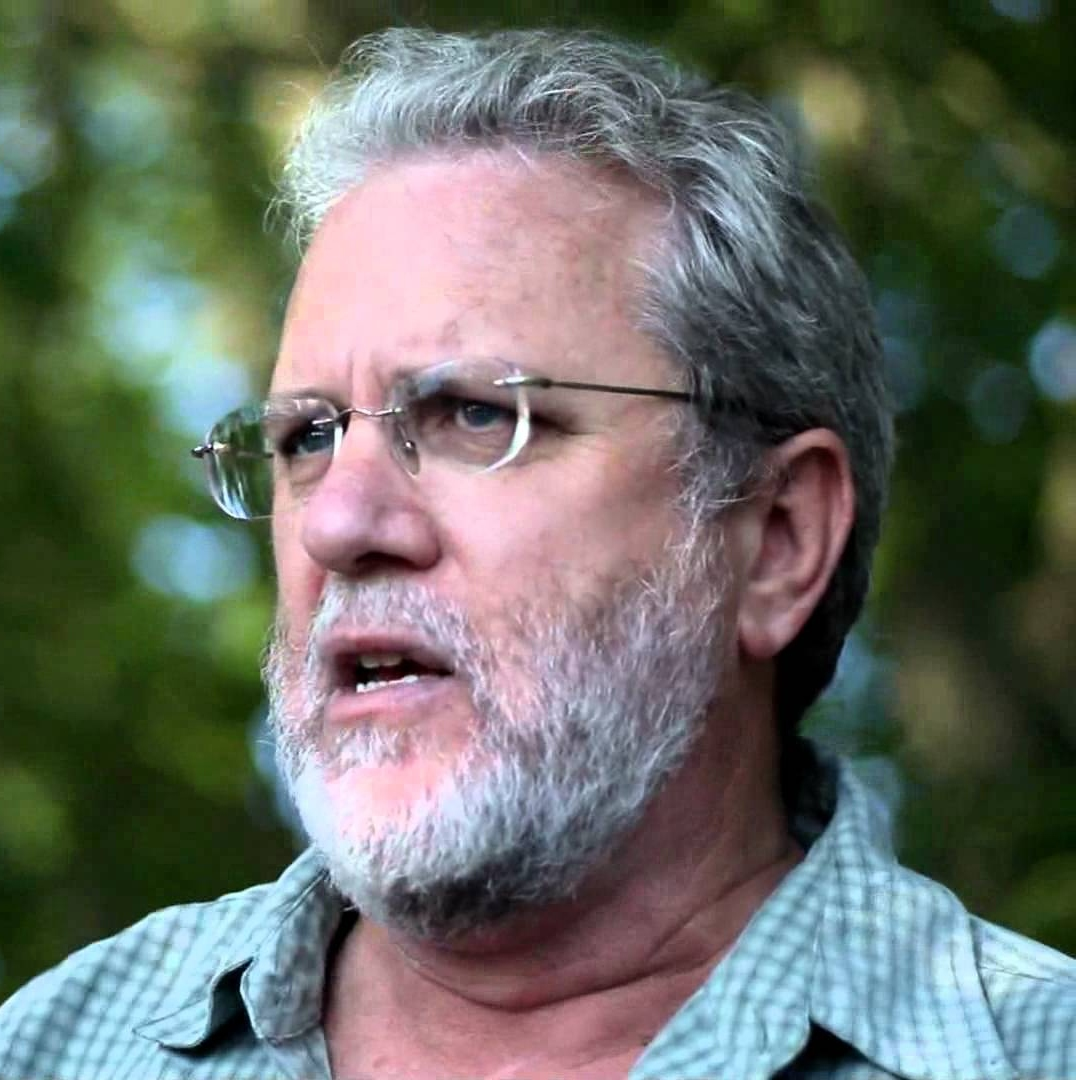
- Born: 1953 (age 72–73); India
- Education: B.A. Messiah College; M.Div. Eastern Baptist Theological Seminary; M.A Fuller Theological Seminary Ph.D Melbourne School of Theology
- Occupation: Polemicist to Islam
- Known for: Polemics, nationalism, historical critique of Islam, ecumenical advocate

Jay Smith (born 1953) is an American polemicist of Islam. Since 1983, he has been a full-time missionary with the Brethren in Christ Church with a focus on polemics among the Muslims of London.

== Biography ==
=== Early life ===
Smith was born in India to Brethren in Christ missionaries and attended Woodstock School in India. His grandparents were also missionaries. He earned a BA from Messiah College and then a Masters of Divinity from Eastern Baptist Theological Seminary in apologetics. He has also earned an MA in Islamics from the Fuller Theological Seminary, and a PhD in apologetics and polemics from the Melbourne School of Theology.

=== Focus on Islam ===
In 1981, while studying for his masters, Smith attended a seminar on Islam while noting that there were only 1,500 Christians ministering to Muslims worldwide, he decided to become a missionary to the Muslim world and pursued a second master's degree in Islamic studies from Fuller Theological Seminary.

In 1987, Smith moved to Senegal as a missionary and in 1992, he moved to London where he continued his education at the School of Oriental and African Studies and the London School of Theology. In 2001, he halted his education to concentrate on apologetics following the terrorist attacks of September 11, 2001.

In 2010, Smith resumed work on his PhD at the Melbourne School of Theology which he completed in March 2017. He helped run the Hyde Park Christian Fellowship, which emphasizes the use of polemics with Muslims alongside apologetics, and has made appearances at Speakers Corner in Hyde Park, London for over 24 years. Smith also engages in formal public debates with prominent Muslim apologists and scholars including Omar Bakri Muhammad, Azzam Tamimi, Shabir Ally, Anjem Choudary, Abdur Raheem Green and Edip Yüksel.

Smith believes that although both Islam and Christianity include radicals, moderates, and liberals, it is radical Muslims that commit violence as they take the Qur’an seriously, while radical Christians who also take the Bible seriously serve others in love. He claims that radical Muslims model their lives on Muhammad, while radical Christians model their lives on Jesus Christ. Smith believes the growth in radical Islam in Britain is due to disaffected Muslims, often minimally religious, returning to their Islamic roots. He says that after reading the Islamic scriptures (the Qur'an in conjunction with the hadith, tafsir, and sira), they come to the conclusion that the Salafi/Athari understanding is the true form of Islam. Smith also believes that although Western actions in the Islamic world can instigate Muslim discontent, it is the Islamic scriptures that encourage the violence. He also rues the fact that moderate Muslims are not able to challenge the radicals using scripture because he believes the radicals have the scriptural authority. Smith believes that ultimately Muslims and others will realize that the Muslim scriptures, coupled with the example of their prophet Muhammad, are irrelevant to modern times.

Smith's polemical approach has been praised by the Salafi Omar Bakri Muhammad.
