= Jean-Pierre Nguema =

Gabonese politician (1932–2008)

Jean Pierre Nzoghé Nguema (1932 – 5 December 2008) was a Gabonese deputy, senator and physicist. Nguema had been a top opposition leader against longtime Gabonese President Omar Bongo for much of his political career. However, he joined the ruling Gabonese Democratic Party in his later years. He was the first chairman of the Komo-Mondah Department Council (Komo-Océan Department).

Nguema was a physicist by profession, and earned his doctorate in physics. He most actively opposed Bongo's rule between 1967 and 1971. Nguema was a member of the National Recovery Movement (MORENA), which is based in Gabon and France, during this era.

Nguema was first elected to the National Assembly of Gabon as a Member of Parliament in 2001 as a member of the opposition Congress for Democracy and Justice (CDJ) political party. He later became a Senator after joining the ruling Gabonese Democratic Party (PDG).

Jean-Pierre Nguema died on 5 December 2008, at the age of 76.
