= John Webster (orator) =

Australian soap box orator (1913–2008)

John Webster (December 1913 – 15 December 2008), also known as Mo(u)hammed Jon Webster, or more simply just Webster, was a soap box orator and public speaker, primarily at Speakers' Corner near Marble Arch at Hyde Park, London and beneath the Moreton Bay fig trees of The Domain, Sydney from the early 1950s till the late 1980s. He also made sorties into Arabia, Tasmania, Melbourne's Yarra Bank and various other outposts of what had been the British Empire. Webster, who almost exclusively referred to himself in the third person, delivered a wide-reaching and eclectic philosophy in a hybrid carny barking cockney/Australian accent. He was the most prominent and listened-to of all long-term speakers at the Sydney Domain. Journalist John Edwards wrote in 1971 "The only (modern) force is the inimitable Webster who, lately returned from England, is responsible for most of the popularity of the (Sydney) Domain." Nene King observed of a day spent at the Sydney Domain "Webster (no first name, no mister) commanded the largest audience as he waved a verbal flag for the British Empire – 'We Englishmen are God's gift to the whole world.'"

== Early life ==
Webster was born in London in December 1913. His father battled alcoholism and his mother was in the Salvation Army. His grandparents were Irish. As a teenager, Webster was a Salvation Army soldier and worked in dispatch at the Army's Trade Headquarters. At 18 he became disillusioned, left the Salvation Army and became an atheist.

== Ideological development and worldview ==
Webster, by his own confession, navigated the whole ideological spectrum from the centre to the far left, then over to the extreme right and back to the middle again. A communist rabble-rouser in the 1940s, he went on to subscribe to the anti-semitic views of the British fascists, until he was approached by Oswald Mosley who told him – inter alia – in 1947 "we can use the Jews." This prompted Webster to reassess his own ideas and he subsequently wrote a letter of apology to the Jewish Chronicle expressing regret about his former views.

Webster's use of the name Mohammed came from when, having received the honorary title of Sheikh from the Hazhar University of Cairo while married to a Jewish woman, he embraced Islam in order to marry a Muslim one. This marriage to a Persian woman in 1963 was as brief as his previous marriage. He told journalist Linda Hornsey that he had been working for the Ministry of Information when he suggested on a television programme, amongst other things, that the Arabs should make peace with Israel: "After that I made a quick but quiet retreat from the Middle East". He also told her that he had once been a "card-carrying member" of the Communist party, then a fascist, and a mystical Moslem of Sufistic leaning before evolving into a "simple" humanist. He had come to see adherence to doctrinaire creeds as dangerous, and planned to set up an "ecological workshop on religion", where anyone willing could come to have their religion "tested".

== Oratorical style and technique ==
Webster claimed that his purpose in orating was to inspire people to think for themselves. His method was one of deliberate provocation, conscious deployment of irony, "verbal cartooning" and a razor-edged wit attested to by all commentators of the time. "I have never yet heard Webster bettered by a heckler, nor stuck for some kind of answer to a question." "It could be argued that the greatest demagogue in Australia today is a 53-year-old Cockney named Muhammed (sic) John Webster" wrote Sydney Morning Herald journalist Gavin Souter in 1966, "There is no one in the Australian Parliaments to match him, and in Sydney's Domain he has no real competition." "Webster insults, abuses and ridicules his audience. The response, in laughter and applause, would be the envy of any television comic" observed Jim Oram. A video of John speaking in Sydney's Domain can be found in the Youtube video, 'Webster's Domain'.

== Personal life ==
Though he was married twice he had a number of gay relationships.

== Death and legacy ==
The Rev Ted Noffs, founder of the Wayside Chapel in Kings Cross, New South Wales claimed "Here at the Chapel, Webster has helped to make what we call the Family of Man a reality." The Uniting Church of Australia's Rev Bill Crews, host of a free restaurant catering to the poor and indigent in Ashfield, New South Wales, made frequent visits to Webster's domicile in the latter's declining years. He remarked that "He (Webster) influenced so many people, taught us how to think in lots of ways...I think he thought he'd live forever" Webster died quietly at a secret retreat in Launceston, Tasmania shortly before his 96th birthday, leaving no immediate heirs.
