= George Constantinou =

Sir George Constantinou OBE (10 May 1930 – 16 December 2008) was a Papua New Guinean businessman and builder. Constantinou, who was born in Cyprus, immigrated to Papua New Guinea in the 1950s. He was considered to be one of Papua New Guinea's wealthiest and most successful businessmen. He lived in Papua New Guinea almost his entire life. He had 12 children, most of whom live in Papua New Guinea, Australia and the Philippines.

Constantinou was killed after being struck on the head and other blows to his body during a failed carjacking in Gerehu, Port Moresby. The attackers were then killed by guerrilla soldiers in Moresby.

== Funeral ==
As he had requested in his will, George Constantinou's funeral was held at the St. George Greek Orthodox Church in South Brisbane, Australia and was buried next to his mother at Mount Gravatt Cemetery on Monday 22 December 2008.
