= Manuel Benitez =

American actor

- Born: September 28, 1969; Coral Gables, Florida, United States
- Died: December 23, 2008 (aged 39); El Monte, California, United States
- Other name: Mark Everett
- Occupation: Actor
- Years active: 1980–1988
- Partner: Stephanie Spears (1996–2004)
- Children: Benjamin Everett

Manuel Benitez (September 28, 1969 – December 23, 2008), who went by the stage name Mark Everett, was an American child actor in Hollywood films and a fugitive wanted by the FBI for the murder of his girlfriend in 2004. On December 23, 2008, he was shot and killed by police officers responding to a hostage situation in El Monte, California.

== Early life and acting career ==
Manuel Benitez was the illegitimate son of the internationally famous bullfighter Manuel Benitez, known as "El Cordobés" (not to be confused with the younger bullfighter with the same name who claimed to be El Cordobés' illegitimate son-known in bullfighting circles as "The Pretender"). Spanish paparazzi followed the real El Cordobés and Benitez's mother, Alina Elizabeth Velasco throughout the world as they partied through the 1970s. Their relationship ended in a bitter five-year court dispute, with Velasco moving to Los Angeles to hire lawyer Marvin Mitchelson to seek support for her and her son.

Benitez was nine years old when he began his acting career. His early roles in Hollywood were guided by child agent, Iris Burton. He starred in commercials, TV shows and movies. His roles included parts in Be Somebody... or Be Somebody's Fool!, Pee-wee's Big Adventure and Stand and Deliver. He also appeared in the TV shows Galactica 1980 and Highway to Heaven.

== Life after acting career ==
Benitez had no major acting work since 1988 when he met Stephanie Spears in 1996. The two moved in together and had one child, Benjamin Everett. Benitez never told Spears or anyone else about his former days as a child actor. According to the FBI, Benitez sold drugs to supplement the money he made doing odd jobs.

Benitez was arrested on drug charges in 2000 and convicted for possession of a concealed and illegal loaded firearm in his son's stroller in 2003 and was sentenced to probation.

== Murder of Stephanie Spears ==
His girlfriend eventually decided to end their relationship. On the night of June 20, 2004, Benitez tried to leave with their son while Spears was asleep. After she woke up and tried to stop him, an argument ensued. Benitez allegedly beat her numerous times with a dumbbell, killing her in front of their three-year-old child before fleeing their Hawthorne, California home with him.

Benitez and his son Benjamin were believed to be traveling with his mother, Alina Elizabeth Velasco, who disappeared after Spears' murder. They were sighted in the Medford, Oregon area in December 2004.

On May 11, 2005, a state warrant was issued by the Superior Court of California, County of Los Angeles, for Benitez's arrest after he was charged with murder. Benitez was charged federally with unlawful flight to avoid prosecution and an arrest warrant was issued by the United States District Court, Central District of California, on March 21, 2006.

The FBI was offering a reward of up to $20,000 for information leading to the arrest of Benitez. He was featured on America's Most Wanted several times.

== El Monte restaurant standoff and death ==
On December 23, 2008, police received a call about a suspicious man with a child. A police officer and witnesses noticed a man take a boy off of the sidewalk and go into a restaurant in El Monte, California. Soon after that, a hostage standoff ensued and Benitez ignored the officers' orders to stop and barricaded himself inside the restaurant bathroom with his son. Benitez told police during negotiations that he was going to shoot police and harm his seven-year-old son whom he held hostage for two hours. One employee of a nearby Mexican restaurant said Benitez had the boy in a headlock and held a gun to his head as he sought a place to hold him.

Police closed nearby streets, and shoppers were evacuated from neighboring stores as dozens of police officers and other emergency crews surrounded the restaurant. Police threw a flash-bang grenade inside and exchanged gunfire with Benitez, killing him. Benitez was declared dead at a Chinese restaurant in an El Monte strip mall. His son was shot in the thigh but survived.

Benitez was later found to have a semi-automatic pistol and a revolver. Alina Elizabeth Velasco has not been located.
