= Gian Franco Romagnoli =

Italian chef, author, and television personality

Gian Franco Romagnoli (1926 – 15 December 2008) was an Italian chef, author, and television personality. He hosted The Romagnolis’ Table, an American program about Italian cookery, alongside his wife Margaret, from 1973 to 1975.

Born in Italy, Romagnoli trained as a cameraman and a director. While working at a film studio, he met Margaret O’Neill, an American information officer for the Marshall Plan. She became his supervisor, and the pair married in 1952. Due to American government regulations, Margaret lost her job. The couple left for America in 1955.

The pair moved to Watertown, Massachusetts, and Romagnoli got a job as a cameraman at WGBH-TV. He later worked as a cinematographer. After a trip back to Italy, the couple put forward the idea of an Italian home cooking program. The Romagnolis’ Table made its debut in 1973 and lasted until 1975. The show was originally broadcast on WGBH but was later shown by PBS.

After the show ended, Romagnoli opened up a restaurant under the same name. The restaurant operated for 10 years and closed in 1989. Romagnoli also opened two sister restaurants and released three cook books.

Margaret died in 1995. Romagnoli remarried in 1998 to Gwen O’Sullivan. The pair wrote two travel books about Italy and its cuisine. Romagnoli died on 15 December 2008.

His last book, The Bicycle Runner: A Memoir of Love, Loyalty, and the Italian Resistance, was published in 2009, after his death. His widow, Gwen, spotted the manuscript in a bottom drawer in 1996 and brought it to light. The book is his reminiscences of "growing up in Italy during the war", of his experiences in the fascist Youth Organization, and his joining the underground Resistance. Racing around Rome on bicycles, he smuggled messages and weapons for the partisans.
