= Jim Horne (model) =

American actor (1917-2008)

- Born: James Wesley Horne Jr. March 28, 1917; Glendale, California, U.S.
- Died: December 29, 2008 (aged 91); Manhattan, New York City, U.S.
- Spouse(s): Ann Fredericks (divorced); Francesca Marlowe Horne (1963–2008 (his death))
- Military career
- Branch: United States Army
- Conflicts: World War II
- Awards: Bronze Star (2)

James Wesley Horne Jr. (March 28, 1917 – December 29, 2008) was a male model during the 1950s.

== History ==
James Wesley Horne Jr. was born on March 28, 1917, in Glendale, California. His father, James W. Horne, was a prolific director of both silent films and talkies, best known for his work with Laurel and Hardy, including Big Business and Way Out West. His mother, Cleo Ridgely, was an actress and a great beauty from whom, it was generally acknowledged, Horne inherited his looks. His twin sister, June, grew up to marry the actor Jackie Cooper.

For about 15 years beginning in the late 1940s, Horne was ubiquitous, perhaps the most widely seen male model in the country, appearing in hundreds of advertisements in magazines and newspapers, on billboards and catalog covers, in television commercials and industrial brochures.

Horne had small, sometimes uncredited parts in about two dozen films, including Gunga Din and A Place in the Sun. He auditioned for the part of Joe Bonaparte, the violinist who wants to be a boxer, in the film version of Clifford Odets's play Golden Boy, but the role went instead to another unknown actor, William Holden, who shortly thereafter became Horne's bunkmate in Army basic training. Horne served in Europe in World War II, becoming a combat photographer and earning two Bronze Stars.

After returning to California, he continued to work in the movies and began modeling as well. By the early 1950s, as televisions became more common in American homes, advertisers seized on the new medium and began looking for models who could act a little. It was an opportunity that wasn't lost on Horne, and he moved to New York City, where he was soon immersed in bookings.

This was an era of growth in advertising, especially on television, where many commercials were broadcast live, resulting in a lot of nuttiness. Once, as Horne performed in an ad for the hair tonic Brylcreem, his comb stuck on a thread in his pocket. When he whipped it out to slick back his pompadour, he accidentally flung it across the room.

A 1953 photograph of Horne smiting his brow became an Internet meme when linking to the photograph became a popular expression for facepalming to indicate disgust or exasperation.

Male models were something of a new breed, weirdly anonymous and perceived by many as suspicious or threatening; once, dressed spiffily for work and passing an hour in a bar while he waited for a photographer who was late for an appointment, Horne was badly beaten by thugs who didn't appreciate his taste in clothes.

In general, male models also didn't get rich; as late as 1965, Horne's hourly rate was $50 ($346 in 2010). But the job allowed him to lead the high life, traveling with pals like Mickey Mantle, whom he met at Toots Shor's restaurant, and Clark Gable, a sometime fishing companion.

Horne's first marriage ended in divorce. He never had children and is survived by his wife, a former model herself, who became international director of the Barbizon School of Modeling. In 1980, under the name Francine Marlowe, she wrote Male Modeling: An Inside Look (Crown). He also leaves his last remaining blood relative, a nephew, John Cooper, of Marin County, California.

Horne's modeling career continued sporadically through the 1960s, especially in print ads featuring products for "mature" men. In the mid-1960s, he became a sales manager and spokesman for an apparel company, and he later established his own business, manufacturing leather belts.

== Gentlemen's Quarterly ==
In the summer of 1957, when Apparel Arts, a men's fashion magazine, decided to create a new identity for itself after more than a quarter century, it chose Horne for the cover of the magazine's first issue under its new name: Gentlemen's Quarterly. He appeared there in a jaunty striped jacket peering rakishly from behind a tropical plant.

== Death ==
Although Horne died in Manhattan on December 29, 2008, his death was not published until January 24, 2009. His wife of 45 years, Francesca Marlowe Horne, said the cause was cancer, but added that he also had congestive heart failure.
