= Chris Richardson (basketball) =

American basketball player

Personal information
- Born: March 26, 1980 Corpus Christi, Texas, U.S.
- Died: December 10, 2008 (aged 28) Sasebo, Japan

Career information
- College: UNLV

Chris LaMark "Flash" Richardson (March 26, 1980 – December 10, 2008) was an American basketball player and a member of the Harlem Globetrotters.

== Early life ==
Born in Corpus Christi, Texas, Richardson moved to Las Vegas, Nevada, when he began playing college basketball at the University of Nevada, Las Vegas in 1998.

== Career ==
Shortly after his college career ended, he joined the Harlem Globetrotters. Richardson was known for his dunking skills and a genial disposition. Sports Illustrated featured Richardson in their November 9, 1998, issue after he won the slam dunk competition as a freshman at the UNLV Fan Jam. As a senior in college, Richardson participated in the 14th Annual Slam Dunk and Three-point Championships held in Atlanta on March 28, 2002.

== Death ==
He died of a brain aneurysm in Japan. The Harlem Globetrotters were at a U.S. military base in Sasebo, Japan, as part of an annual holiday tour.
