= List of Anglicans =

This is a list of Anglicans, notable persons who were members of the church in communion with the Archbishop of Canterbury, known as an Anglican Communion church. Members of schismatic churches may also be included. Only former Anglicans who left the church in adulthood may be included, with accompanying notice.

== A to E ==
- Most Rev. George Abbot (1562–1633), English Archbishop (75th Archbishop of Canterbury 1611–1633, Bishop of London 1610–1611, Bishop of Lichfield 1609–1610 and Dean of Winchester 1600–1609)
- Joseph Abbott (clergyman) (1790–1862), Canadian clergyman in the Anglican Church of Canada
- Dean Acheson (1893–1971), American lawyer, Democratic politician and statesman (51st United States Secretary of State 1949–1953, 14th United States Under Secretary of State 1945–1947 and 1st Assistant Secretary of State for Legislative Affairs 1944–1945)
- Daniel Dulany Addison (1863–1936), American clergyman and writer (he was knighted in 1904 by the government of Liberia for his services)
- Joseph Addison (1672–1719), English essayist, poet, playwright, politician and co-founder, with his friend Sir Richard Steele, of The Spectator
- Rev. Robert Addison (1754–1829), English-born Canadian clergyman and missionary of the Church of England
- Prince Adolphus, Duke of Cambridge (1774–1850), military officer, seventh son of George III and his wife Charlotte of Mecklenburg-Strelitz
- Spiro Agnew (1918–1996), American military officer, Republican politician and statesman (39th Vice President of the United States 1969–1973, 55th Governor of Maryland 1967–1969 and 3rd Executive of Baltimore County 1962–1966)
- Howard Ahmanson Jr. (b. 1950), American Christian activist
- Madeleine Albright (1937–2022), American diplomat, political scientist and stateswoman (64th United States Secretary of State 1997–2001 and 20th United States Ambassador to the United Nations 1993–1997)
- Rev. W. H. Aldis (1871–1948), English Anglican missionary and priest who served as Chairman of the Keswick Convention from 1936 to 1939 and again from 1946 to 1947
- Thomas William Allies (1813–1903), English historian (converted to Catholicism in 1850)
- Most Rev. John Allin (1921–1998), American bishop (23rd Presiding Bishop of the Episcopal Church 1974–1985, Bishop of Mississippi 1966–1974 and Coadjutor Bishop of Mississippi 1961–1966)
- William Allingham (1824–1889), Irish poet, diarist and editor
- Most Rev. Charles P. Anderson (1865–1930), Canadian bishop (17th Presiding Bishop of the Episcopal Church 1929–1930, Bishop of Chicago 1905–1930 and Coadjutor Bishop of Chicago 1900–1905)
- Rt. Rev. Lancelot Andrewes (1555–1626), saintly English bishop and scholar, who oversaw the translation of the Authorized Version (or King James Version) of the Bible (Bishop of Winchester 1619–1626, Dean of the Chapel Royal 1618–1626, Bishop of Ely 1609–1619, Lord Almoner 1605–1619, Bishop of Chichester 1605–1609 and Dean of Westminster 1601–1605)
- Most Rev. Mouneer Anis (b. 1950), Egyptian bishop (Anglican Archbishop of Alexandria 2020–2021, President Bishop of the Episcopal Church in Jerusalem and the Middle East 2007–2017 and Anglican Bishop of Egypt 2000–2021)
- Queen Anne (1665–1714), Queen of Great Britain and Ireland
- Anne, Princess Royal (b. 1950), member of the British royal family
- Thomas Arnold, English educator, historian and headmaster of Rugby School (he was a supporter of the Broad Church Anglican movement)
- Sir Thomas Walker Arnold (1864–1930), British orientalist and historian of Islamic art
- Chester Arthur (1829–1886), American lawyer, military officer and Republican politician (21st President of the United States 1881–1885, 20th Vice President of the United States March 4–September 19, 1881, 10th Chairman of the New York Republican Party 1879–1881, 21st Collector of the Port of New York 1871–1878, Engineer-in-Chief of the New York Militia 1861–1863, Inspector General of the New York Militia April 14–July 12, 1862 and Quartermaster General of the New York Militia 1862–1863)
- Fred Astaire (1899–1987), American actor, choreographer, dancer, musician, presenter and singer
- John Aubrey (1626–1697), English pioneer archeologist, antiquarian, writer and natural philosopher
- W. H. Auden (1907–1973), British-American poet
- Jane Austen (1775–1817), English novelist
- Rev. Wilbert Awdry (1911–1997), English Anglican priest, railway enthusiast and children's author best known for being the creator of Thomas the Tank Engine and several other characters who appeared in his Railway Series
- Anne Ayres (1816–1896), British-born American Episcopalian nun and founder of the Sisterhood of the Holy Communion (the first Episcopalian religious order for women)
- Charles Babbage (1791–1871), English inventor, mathematician, mechanical engineer, philosopher and polymath (he was the originator of the concept of a digital programmable computer)
- Rev. Ed Bacon (b. 1948), American Episcopalian priest (Baptist convert)
- Francis Bacon, 1st Viscount St Alban, 1st Lord Verulam (1561–1626), English philosopher and statesman (Lord High Chancellor of England 1617–1621 and Attorney General of England and Wales 1613–1617)
- Edward Badeley (1803/4–1868), British ecclesiastical lawyer and former member of the Oxford movement (he converted to Catholicism in 1852)
- Robert Baden-Powell, 1st Baron Baden-Powell (1857–1941), British Army officer, writer, founder and first Chief Scout of The Boy Scouts Association, and founder, with his sister Agnes, of The Girl Guides Association
- Jacob Bailey (1731–1808), American clergyman, author and poet (a former Congregationalist preacher who converted to Anglicanism in 1760)
- Douglas M. Baker Jr. (b. 1958), American businessman and former chairman of the board and CEO of Ecolab, Inc.
- Most Rev. Richard Bancroft (1544–1610), English Archbishop (74th Archbishop of Canterbury 1604–1610, Bishop of London 1597–1604, Canon of Canterbury 1595–1597 and Canon of Westminster 1592–1597)
- Sabine Baring-Gould (1834–1924), English priest, hagiographer, antiquarian, novelist and folk song collector
- Fred Barnes (b. 1943), American journalist and political commentator
- Rev. Isaac Barrow (1630–1677), English author, Christian theologian and mathematician
- Diana Butler Bass (b. 1959), American author, historian of Christianity and an advocate for progressive Christianity
- Richard Bauckham (b. 1946), British theologian and New Testament scholar specialising in New Testament Christology and the Gospel of John
- Evan Bayh (b. 1955), American Democratic politician (United States Senator from Indiana 1999–2011, 46th Governor of Indiana 1989–1997 and 56th Secretary of State of Indiana 1986–1989)
- Princess Beatrice (b. 1988), member of the British royal family
- Jeremy Begbie (b. 1957), British academic, Anglican priest and theologian
- Canon Gareth Bennett (1929–1987), British Anglican priest and academic and critic of the Church of England
- Most Rev. Edward White Benson (1829–1896), British Archbishop (94th Archbishop of Canterbury 1883–1896 and Bishop of Truro 1877–1883)
- Rev. Richard Meux Benson (1824–1915), English priest and founder of the Society of St John the Evangelist, the first religious order of monks in the Anglican Communion since the English Reformation
- Robert Hugh Benson (1871–1914), British priest and writer, son of Edward White Benson, Archbishop of Canterbury (Robert converted to Catholicism in 1903 and was ordained a priest the following year)
- Rt. Rev. George Berkeley (1685–1753), Anglo-Irish bishop and philosopher (Bishop of Cloyne 1734–1753)
- R. J. Berry (1934–2018), British geneticist, naturalist and Christian theorist
- Sir John Betjeman (1906–1984), English poet, writer and broadcaster (Poet Laureate of the United Kingdom 1972–1984)
- Kenneth Bevan (1898–1993), English missionary bishop (Bishop of East Szechwan 1940–1950)
- Sir William Blackstone (1723–1780), English jurist, judge, and Tory politician (Justice of the Common Pleas 1770–1780, Justice of the Court of King's Bench 16 February 1770 – 25 June 1770, Member of Parliament for Westbury 1768–1770 and Member of Parliament for Hindon 1761–1768)
- James Blair (Virginia) (1656–1743), Scottish-born Church of England clergyman, educator and missionary (he was the founder of the College of William and Mary in Williamsburg, Virginia and served as its first President from 1693 to 1743)
- Mary Blandy (c. 1720–1752), English murderer
- James Blish (1927–1975), American science fiction and fantasy writer (atheist as an adult, then rejoined the church)
- Phillip Blond (b. 1966), English political philosopher and theologian
- Anne Boleyn (c. 1501 or 1507–1536), Queen consort of England (1533–1536) and second wife of Henry VIII
- Frederick Boreham (1888–1966), English clergyman, missionary, former Archdeacon of Cornwall (1949–1965) and former Chaplain to Elizabeth II
- John Bowles (1753–1819), English author, barrister and pamphleteer
- Hon. Robert Boyle (1627–1691), Anglo-Irish alchemist, chemist, inventor, natural philosopher and physicist
- Charles Bradley (1789–1871), English Anglican priest, preacher, writer of sermons and father of British idealist philosopher F. H. Bradley
- Marion Zimmer Bradley (1930–1999), American author
- Maria Branwell (1783–1821), Cornish writer and mother of the Brontë sisters
- Rt. Rev. John Bridgeman (1577–1652), English bishop (Bishop of Chester 1619–1646) he is the ancestor of the Bridgeman baronets of Lever, Earls of Bradford (of the second creation) and the Viscounts Bridgeman
- Robert Bridges (1844–1930), British poet (Poet Laureate of the United Kingdom 1913–1930)
- Thomas Edward Brown (1830–1897), Manx scholar, poet, schoolmaster, clergyman and theologian
- Sir Thomas Browne (1605–1682), English author and polymath
- Most Rev. Thomas Church Brownell (1779 –1865), American bishop and founder of Trinity College in Hartford, Connecticut (7th Presiding Bishop of the Episcopal Church 1852–1865 and Bishop of Connecticut 1819–1865)
- Most Rev. Edmond L. Browning (1929–2016), American bishop (24th Presiding Bishop of the Episcopal Church 1985–1997, Bishop of Hawaii 1976–1985, Executive for National and World Mission 1974–1976, Bishop of the Convocation of American Churches in Europe 1971–1974 and Bishop of Okinawa 1968–1971)
- Anne Brontë (1820–1849), English novelist and poet
- Charlotte Brontë (1816–1855), English novelist and poet
- Emily Brontë (1818–1848), English novelist and poet
- Rev. Patrick Brontë (1777–1861), Irish author, Anglican clergyman and father of the Brontë sisters
- Rt. Rev. John Buckeridge (c. 1562–1631), English bishop and Arminian theologian (Bishop of Rochester 1611–1628 and Bishop of Ely 1628–1631)
- Robert Bulwer-Lytton, 1st Earl of Lytton (1831–1891), English statesman, Conservative politician and poet (British Ambassador to France 1887–1891 and Viceroy and Governor-General of India 1876–1880)
- Rt. Rev. Charles Sumner Burch (1855–1920), American bishop (9th Bishop of New York 1919–1920 and Suffragan Bishop of New York 1911–1919)
- Edmund Burke (1729–1797), Anglo-Irish statesman and political theorist
- Sir Edward Burne-Jones, 1st Baronet (1833–1898), English painter and designer
- Rt. Rev. Gilbert Burnet (1643–1715), Scottish bishop, historian and philosopher (Bishop of Salisbury 1689–1715)
- Frances Burney (1752–1840), English diarist, playwright and satirical novelist
- George H. W. Bush (1924–2018), American businessman, diplomat and Republican politician (41st President of the United States 1989–1993, 43rd Vice President of the United States 1981–1989, 11th Director of Central Intelligence 1976–1977, 2nd Chief of the United States Liaison Office to the People's Republic of China 1974–1975, Chair of the Republican National Committee 1973–1974, 10th United States Ambassador to the United Nations 1971–1973 and Member of the United States House of Representatives from Texas's 7th Congressional district 1967–1971)
- Prescott Bush (1895–1972), American banker, military officer and Republican politician (United States Senator from Connecticut 1952–1963)
- Rt. Rev. Joseph Butler (1692–1752), English bishop, apologist, philosopher and theologian (Bishop of Durham 1750–1752, Bishop of Bristol 1738–1750 and Dean of St Paul's 1740–1750)
- Samuel Butler (1613–1680), English poet and satirist
- Harry F. Byrd (1887–1966), American newspaper publisher and Democratic politician (United States Senator from Virginia 1933–1965, 50th Governor of Virginia 1926–1930, Member of the Virginia Senate from Virginia's 26th Senate district 1924–1926 and Member of the Virginia Senate from Virginia's 10th Senate district 1916–1924)
- James F. Byrnes (1882–1972), American judge and Democratic politician (104th Governor of South Carolina 1951–1955, 49th United States Secretary of State 1945 –1947, Director of the Office of War Mobilization 1943–1945, Director of the Office of Economic Stabilization 1942–1943, Associate Justice of the Supreme Court of the United States 1941–1942, United States Senator from South Carolina 1931–1941 and Member of the United States House of Representatives from South Carolina's 2nd Congressional district 1911–1925)
- Cab Calloway (1907–1994), American jazz singer and bandleader
- George Owen Cambridge (1756–1841), English Churchman and Archdeacon of Middlesex (1806–1840)
- David Cameron (b. 1966), British politician (Prime Minister of the United Kingdom 2010–2016, Secretary of State for Foreign, Commonwealth and Development Affairs 2023–2024, Leader of the Conservative Party 2005–2016, Leader of the Opposition 2005–2010, Member of the House of Lords Lord Temporal 2023–Present and Member of Parliament for Witney 2001–2016)
- Queen Camilla (b. 1947), Queen consort of the United Kingdom of Great Britain and Northern Ireland and the Commonwealth Realms
- Justin R. Cannon (b. 1984), American author, Episcopal priest and theologian
- Robert Farrar Capon (1925–2013), American author, chef and Episcopal priest
- Most Rev. George Carey, Baron Carey of Clifton (b. 1935), English Archbishop (103rd Archbishop of Canterbury 1991–2002 and Bishop of Bath and Wells 1987–1991)
- Mariah Carey (b. 1969), American singer-songwriter, record producer and actress
- Robert Carliell (d. c. 1622), English didactic poet
- Lewis Carroll (1832–1898), English author, deacon, mathematician, photographer and poet
- William Cassels (1858–1925), English missionary bishop and one of the Cambridge Seven (Bishop of Western China 1895–1925)
- Catherine, Princess of Wales (b. 1982), member of the British royal family
- William Cavendish, Marquess of Hartington (1917–1944), English military officer, nobleman and Conservative politician (heir apparent to the Dukedom of Devonshire, he predeceased his father, and as such the title passed to his younger brother Andrew Cavendish, 11th Duke of Devonshire)
- Rev. Owen Chadwick (1916-2015), English priest, academic, rugby international, historian of Christianity and writer
- Saxby Chambliss (b. 1943), American lawyer and Republican politician (United States Senator from Georgia 2003–2015, Chair of the Senate Agriculture Committee 2005–2007 and Member of the United States House of Representatives from Georgia's 8th Congressional district 1995–2003)
- George Chapman (c. 1559–1634), English classical scholar, dramatist, poet and translator
- John Chapman (1865–1933), English priest, New Testament and patristics scholar (converted to Catholicism in 1890)
- Charles I (1600–1649), King of England, Scotland and Ireland
- Charles II (1630–1685), King of England, Scotland and Ireland (converted to Catholicism on his deathbed)
- Charles III (b. 1948), King of the United Kingdom of Great Britain and Northern Ireland and the Commonwealth Realms
- Most Rev. Philander Chase (1775–1852), American bishop, educator and pioneer of the United States Western Frontier (6th Presiding Bishop of the Episcopal Church 1843–1852, Bishop of Illinois 1835–1852 and Bishop of Ohio 1819–1832)
- Salmon P. Chase (1808–1873), American jurist and politician (6th Chief Justice of the United States 1864–1873, 25th United States Secretary of the Treasury 1861–1864, United States Senator from Ohio 1849–1855 and March 4, 1861 – March 5, 1861 and 23rd Governor of Ohio 1856–1860)
- Don Cherry (b. 1934), Canadian former ice hockey player, coach and television commentator
- G. K. Chesterton (1874–1936), English author, philosopher, Christian apologist, art and literary critic (he converted to Catholicism on 30 July 1922)
- Very Rev. Richard William Church (1815–1890), English clergyman and writer (Dean of St Paul's 1871–1890)
- Christy Clark (b. 1965), Canadian politician who served as the 35th Premier Of British Columbia (2011–2017) (formerly Leader of the Opposition in British Columbia July 18, 2017 – August 4, 2017, 9th Deputy Premier of British Columbia 2001–2004, Minister of Education of British Columbia June 5, 2001 – January 26, 2004, Minister of Children and Family Development of British Columbia January 26, 2004 – September 20, 2004, Member of the British Columbia Legislative Assembly for Kelowna West 2013–2017, Member of the British Columbia Legislative Assembly for Vancouver-Point Grey 2011–2013 and Member of the British Columbia Legislative Assembly for Port Moody-Westwood (Port Moody-Burnaby Mountain; 1996–2001) 1996–2005)
- Most Rev. Thomas M. Clark (1812–1903), American Episcopal bishop (12th Presiding Bishop of the Episcopal Church 1899–1903 and Bishop of Rhode Island 1854–1903)
- Rev. Eleanor Clitheroe-Bell (b. 1954), Canadian cleric and former businesswoman who served as CEO of Hydro One
- William Cobbett (1763–1835), English farmer, journalist, pamphleteer and Radical politician (MP for Oldham 1832–1835)
- Rev. Henry John Cody (1868–1951), Canadian clergyman, 6th President of the University of Toronto (1932–1944), Chancellor of the University of Toronto (1944–1947) and Member of the Legislative Assembly of Ontario 1918–1920
- Most Rev. Donald Coggan, Baron Coggan (1909–2000), English Archbishop (101st Archbishop of Canterbury 1974–1980, Archbishop of York 1961–1974 and Bishop of Bradford 1956–1961)
- Sir Edward Coke (1552–1634), English barrister, judge and politician (Lord Chief Justice of England 1613–1616, Chief Justice of the Common Pleas 1606–1613, Attorney General for England 1594–1606, Solicitor General for England 1592–1594 and Speaker of the House of Commons 1592–1593)
- Sir John Taylor Coleridge (1790–1876), English judge (Justice of the Queen's Bench 1835–1858)
- Samuel Taylor Coleridge (1772–1834), English poet, literary critic, philosopher and theologian (born and baptised Anglican, he became a Unitarian, but reverted to Anglicanism in 1814)
- Rev. Richard Coles (b. 1962), English vicar, musician, radio presenter, writer and former member of pop band The Communards
- R. G. Collingwood (1889–1943), English philosopher, historian and archaeologist
- Judy Collins (b. 1939), American singer-songwriter and musician
- William Congreve (1670–1729), English playwright, poet and Whig politician
- Rt. Rev. Wallace E. Conkling (1896–1979), American bishop (7th Episcopal Bishop of Chicago 1941–1953)
- Anne Conway (1631–1679), English Enlightenment philosopher (converted to Quakerism in 1677)
- Capt. James Cook (1728–1779), British explorer, cartographer and Naval officer
- Most Rev. Frederick Cornwallis (1713–1783), English Archbishop (87th Archbishop of Canterbury 1768–1783, Bishop of Lichfield 1750–1768 and Dean of St. Paul's, London 1766–1768)
- Rt. Rev. John Cosin (1594–1672), English bishop and academic (Bishop of Durham 1660–1672, Archdeacon of the East Riding 1625–1660, Master of Peterhouse 1635–1643 & 1660, Vice-Chancellor of Cambridge University 1639–1640 and Dean of Peterborough 1640–1660)
- Canon Walter William Covey-Crump, (1865–1949) English clergyman, Freemason and writer
- William Cowper (1731–1800), English poet and hymnodist
- George Crabbe (1754–1832), English poet, surgeon and clergyman
- Rt. Rev. Thomas Cranmer (1489–1556), English Archbishop, leader of the English Reformation, martyr and author of the 1549 Book of Common Prayer (69th Archbishop of Canterbury 1533–1555 and Archdeacon of Taunton ????–1533)
- Ander Crenshaw (b. 1944), American Republican politician (Member of the United States House of Representatives from Florida's 4th Congressional District 2001–2017, President of the Florida Senate 1992–1993, Member of the Florida Senate 1986–1994 and Member of the Florida House of Representatives from the 24th district 1972–1978)
- Alexander Cruden (1699–1770), Scottish author of an early Bible concordance, proofreader and publisher
- Rt. Rev. Richard Cumberland (1631/2–1718), English bishop, Latitudinarian and philosopher (Bishop of Peterborough 1691–1718)
- Most Rev. Michael Curry (b. 1953), American bishop (27th Presiding Bishop of the Episcopal Church 2015–2024 and Bishop of North Carolina 2000–2015)
- Margaret Anna Cusack (1829–1899), Irish nun, religious sister and founder of The Sisters of St. Joseph of Peace (converted to Catholicism in 1858, but reverted to Anglicanism in 1888)
- Pelham Dale (1821–1892), English Anglo-Catholic ritualist priest
- George M. Dallas (1792–1864), American diplomat and Democratic politician (Vice President of the United States 1845–1849, United States Minister to the United Kingdom 1856–1861, United States Minister to Russia 1837–1839, 17th Attorney General of Pennsylvania 1833–1835, United States Senator from Pennsylvania 1831–1833, United States Attorney for the Eastern District of Pennsylvania 1829–1831 and 58th Mayor of Philadelphia 1828–1829)
- Jonathan Myrick Daniels (1939–1965), American Episcopal seminarian and civil rights activist
- Charles Darwin (1809–1882), English biologist, geologist and naturalist (he later became an agnostic)
- Hilda Ellis Davidson (1914–2006), English folklorist
- Most Rev. Randall Davidson, 1st Baron Davidson of Lambeth (1848–1930), the second Scottish Archbishop of Canterbury, longest serving holder of the office since the Reformation and the first to retire from office (96th Archbishop of Canterbury 1903–1928, Bishop of Winchester 1895–1903 and Bishop of Rochester 1891–1895)
- Grace Davie (b. 1946), British professor and sociologist
- Ann B. Davis (1926–2014), American actress
- Jefferson Davis (1808–1889), American army officer, Democratic politician and President of the Confederate States of America (1861–1865) (formerly United States Senator from Mississippi 1857–1861 and 1847–1851, 23rd United States Secretary of War 1853–1857 and Member of the United States House of Representatives from Mississippi's at-large Congressional district 1845–1846)
- Most Rev. Suheil Dawani (b. 1951), Palestinian bishop (President Bishop of the Episcopal Church in Jerusalem and the Middle East 2017–2019, Anglican Archbishop in Jerusalem 2014–2021, Anglican Bishop in Jerusalem 2007–2014 and Coadjutor Bishop in Jerusalem 2006–2007)
- John Dee (1527–1608/9), English mathematician, astronomer, astrologer, alchemist, occultist and teacher
- Rt. Rev. Hassan Dehqani-Tafti (1920–2008), Iranian bishop (President Bishop of the Episcopal Church in Jerusalem and the Middle East 1977–1985 and Bishop of Iran 1960–1990)
- Cecil B. DeMille (1881–1959), American film director, producer and actor
- Sir John Denham (1614/15–1669), Anglo-Irish courtier and poet
- Rev. George Denison (1805–1896), English priest (Archdeacon of Taunton 1851–1896)
- R. James deRoux (1930–2012), Jamaican businessman and 5th Custos Rotulorum of Clarendon (1981–2011) the longest serving Custos Rotulorum in Jamaican history
- Diana, Princess of Wales (1961–1997) ex-wife of Charles, Prince of Wales (now Charles III)
- Philip K. Dick (1928–1982), American Sci-Fi writer and novelist
- Charles Dickens (1812–1870), English novelist, journalist, short story writer and social critic
- Benjamin Disraeli, 1st Earl of Beaconsfield (1804–1881), British Conservative politician, statesman and writer (Prime Minister of the United Kingdom 1874–1880 and 27 February 1868–1 December 1868, Chancellor of the Exchequer 1866–1868, 1858–1859 and 27 February 1852–17 December 1852) (born into a Jewish family, he was baptized as an Anglican at age 12)
- Rev. Dom Gregory Dix (1901–1952), English monk, priest of Nashdom Abbey (an Anglican Benedictine community) and liturgical scholar
- Very Rev. John Donne (1572–1631), English metaphysical poet, cleric, scholar and soldier (converted from Catholicism) (Dean of St Paul's 1621–1631)
- Audrey Donnithorne (1922–2020), English political economist and missionary, daughter of The Ven. Vyvyan Donnithorne (she converted to Catholicism in 1943)
- Ven. Vyvyan Donnithorne (1886–1968), English missionary to Sichuan and Archdeacon of Western Szechwan (1935–1949)
- Nadine Dorries (b. 1957), British author, businesswoman, former Conservative politician and former nurse (MP for Mid Bedfordshire 2005–2023, Secretary of State for Digital, Culture, Media and Sport 2021–2022 and Minister of State for Patient Safety, Suicide Prevention and Mental Health 2019–2021)
- George D'Oyly (1778–1846), English cleric, academic, theologian and biographer
- Augusta Theodosia Drane (1823–1894), English nun, poet and religious writer (she converted to Catholicism in around 1850)
- Marie Dressler (1868–1934), Canadian-American stage and screen actress and comedian
- Henry A. du Pont (1838–1926), American businessman, military officer and Republican politician (United States Senator from Delaware 1906–1917)
- Maria Edgeworth (1768–1849), Anglo-Irish novelist
- Edward VI (1537–1553), King of England and Ireland
- Edward VII (1841–1910), King of the United Kingdom of Great Britain & Ireland and the British Dominions and Emperor of India
- Edward VIII (later Prince Edward, Duke of Windsor) (1894–1972), King of the United Kingdom of Great Britain and Northern Ireland and the British Dominions and Emperor of India (20 January 1936 – 11 December 1936) and Duke of Windsor (1937–1972)
- Prince Edward, Duke of Edinburgh (b. 1964), member of the British royal family
- Prince Edward, Duke of Kent and Strathearn (1767–1820), military officer, fourth son of George III and his wife Charlotte of Mecklenburg-Strelitz and father of Queen Victoria
- Philip Egerton (1832–1911), English priest and schoolmaster who re-founded Bloxham School in 1860
- Riah Abu El-Assal (b. 1937), Israeli-Palestinian bishop (Bishop in Jerusalem 1997–2007)
- T. S. Eliot (1885–1965), US-born British poet, playwright and essayist
- Elizabeth I of England (1533–1603), Queen of England and Ireland
- Elizabeth II (1926–2022), Queen of the United Kingdom of Great Britain and Northern Ireland and the Commonwealth Realms
- Queen Elizabeth the Queen Mother (1900–2002), Queen consort of the United Kingdom of Great Britain and Northern Ireland and the British Dominions (1936–1952) and Empress consort of India (1936–1947), wife of George VI and mother of Elizabeth II and Princess Margaret, Countess of Snowdon
- Duke Ellington (1899–1974), American jazz pianist and composer
- Madeleine L'Engle (1918–2007), American writer
- Werner Erhard (b. 1935), American author, founder of est and lecturer
- Prince Ernest, Duke of Cumberland and Teviotdale (1771–1851), British-German Prince and King of Hanover (1837–1851)
- Edgar Edmund Estcourt (1816–1884), English clergyman (converted to Catholicism in 1845)
- Princess Eugenie (b. 1990), member of the British royal family
- Sir William Evans-Gordon (1857–1913), British Army officer, Conservative politician and diplomat (Member of Parliament for Stepney 1900–1907)
- John Evelyn (1620–1706), English diarist, courtier, landowner, gardener, minor government official, founding Fellow of the Royal Society and writer
- George Every (1909–2003), British poet, historian, theologian and writer on Christian mythology
- J. James Exon (1921–2005), American businessman, Democratic Politician, Senator and WWII Veteran (33rd Governor of Nebraska 1971–1979)

== F to J ==
- Frederick William Faber (1814–1863), English hymnwriter, priest and theologian (he converted to Catholicism in 1845)
- Nigel Farage (b. 1964), British broadcaster and Politician (MP for Clacton 2024–present, Leader of Reform UK January 2021–March 2021 and since 2024, former leader of the Brexit Party 2019–January 2021, former MEP for South East England 1999–2020, former Leader of UKIP 2006–2009 and 2010–2016)
- Rev. Austin Farrer (1904–1968), English priest, theologian, philosopher and friend of C. S. Lewis
- Sarah Ferguson (b. 1959), British author, philanthropist, television personality and former member of the British royal family
- Mary Ferrar (1551–1634), English founder of the Little Gidding community
- Nicholas Ferrar (1592–1637), English businessman, courtier, deacon and leader of the Little Gidding community, publisher of the poetry of George Herbert and scholar
- Rev. John Neville Figgis (1866–1919), English monk and priest, member of Community of the Resurrection, historian and political philosopher
- Sir Robert Filmer (c. 1588–1653), English political theorist
- Most Rev. Geoffrey Fisher, Baron Fisher of Lambeth (1887–1972), English Archbishop and life peer (99th Archbishop of Canterbury 1945–1961, Bishop of London 1939–1945 and Bishop of Chester 1932–1939)
- Sir Ronald Fisher (1890–1962), British polymath, mathematician, statistician, biologist, eugenicist, geneticist and academic
- Sir Adolphus FitzGeorge (1846–1922), British Royal Navy officer, illegitimate son of Prince George, Duke of Cambridge and his mistress Sarah Fairbrother
- Sir Augustus FitzGeorge (1847–1933), British military officer, illegitimate son of Prince George, Duke of Cambridge and his mistress Sarah Fairbrother
- George FitzGeorge (1843–1907), British military officer, illegitimate son of Prince George, Duke of Cambridge and his mistress Sarah Fairbrother
- Robert Fludd (1574–1637), English physician, astrologer, mathematician, cosmologist, Qabalist and Rosicrucian
- Rt. Rev. Alexander Penrose Forbes (1817–1875), Scottish bishop, Episcopalian divine and writer (Bishop of Brechin 1847–1875)
- Betty Ford (1918–2011), American First Lady of the United States (1974–1977), wife of Gerald Ford
- Gerald Ford (1913–2006), American lawyer, Republican Politician and US Navy officer (38th President of the United States 1974–1977 and 40th Vice President of the United States 1973–1974)
- Henry Ford (1863–1947), American industrialist and business magnate known for founding Ford Motor Company
- Rt. Rev. Edward Fowler (1632–1714), English bishop and writer (Bishop of Gloucester 1691–1714)
- John Foxe (1516/17–1587), English clergyman, historian, martyrologist and theologian known for his 1563 book "Actes and Monuments" (also known as "Foxe's Book of Martyrs")
- Frederick, Prince of Wales (1707–1751), heir apparent to the thrones of Great Britain and Ireland, eldest son of George II and his wife Caroline of Ansbach and father of George III
- Sir Clement Freud (1924–2009), British broadcaster, chef, politician and writer (grandson of Sigmund Freud, MP for North East Cambridgeshire 1973–1987) converted from Judaism in 1950
- Dave Freudenthal (b. 1950), American attorney, economist and Democratic Politician (31st Governor of Wyoming 2003–2011)
- Most Rev. Accepted Frewen (1588–1664), English Archbishop (Archbishop of York 1660–1664, Bishop of Lichfield 1644–1646 & 1660 and Dean of Gloucester 1631–1643)
- Alexander Frey, American symphony orchestra conductor, virtuoso organist, pianist, harpischordist and composer
- Hurrell Froude (1803–1836), English priest and early leader of the Oxford movement
- Thomas Gage (clergyman), English former Dominican Friar and writer (converted from Catholicism in 1637)
- Samuel Tertius Galton (1783–1844), British businessman, scientist and father of the polymath and eugenicist Sir Francis Galton (he converted from Quakerism in 1807)
- Samuel Rawson Gardiner (1829–1902), English historian
- Judy Garland (1922–1969), American actress, dancer and singer
- Most Rev. Alexander Charles Garrett (1832–1924), American bishop (14th Presiding Bishop of the Episcopal Church 1923–1924 and Bishop of Dallas 1874–1924)
- David Garrick (1717–1779), British actor, playwright, producer and theatre manager
- Robert Gascoyne-Cecil, 3rd Marquess of Salisbury (1830–1903), British statesman and Conservative politician, who served as Prime Minister of the United Kingdom three times for a total of thirteen years (1885–1886), (1886–1892) and (1895–1902)
- George I (1660–1727), King of Great Britain and Ireland, Elector of Hanover and Duke of Brunswick-Lüneburg
- George II (1683–1760), King of Great Britain and Ireland, Elector of Hanover and Duke of Brunswick-Lüneburg
- George III (1738–1820), King of the United Kingdom of Great Britain & Ireland and King of Hanover
- George IV (1762–1830), King of the United Kingdom of Great Britain & Ireland and King of Hanover
- George V (1865–1936), King of the United Kingdom of Great Britain & Northern Ireland and the British Dominions and Emperor of India
- George VI (1895–1952), King of the United Kingdom of Great Britain & Northern Ireland and the British Dominions and Emperor of India
- Prince George, Duke of Cambridge (1819–1904), military officer, son of Prince Adolphus, Duke of Cambridge and his wife Princess Augusta of Hesse-Kassel
- Rt. Rev. Jonathan Gibbs (b. 1961), English Anglican bishop (Bishop of Rochester 2022–Present and Area Bishop of Huddersfield 2014–2022)
- Lillian Gish (1893–1993), American actress
- William Ewart Gladstone (1809–1898), British Liberal Party Politician (Prime Minister of the UK 1868–1874, 1880–1885, 1 February 1886 – 21 July 1886 and 1892–1894)
- Rt. Rev. Francis Godwin (1562–1633), English bishop, historian and sci-fi writer (Bishop of Llandaff 1601–1617 and Bishop of Hereford 1617–1633)
- Barry Goldwater (1909–1998), American military officer, Republican Politician, Senator and 1964 Presidential candidate
- Hannibal Goodwin (1822–1900), American Episcopal clergyman and inventor
- Rt. Rev. Charles Gore (1853–1932), British Anglican bishop, theologian, founder of the monastic Community of the Resurrection and co-founder of the Christian Social Union (Bishop of Oxford 1911–1919, Bishop of Birmingham 1905–1911 and Bishop of Worcester 1902–1905)
- Rev. George Cornelius Gorham (1787–1857), English priest and writer (Vicar of St Just in Penwith 1846–1847 and Vicar of Brampford Speke 1847–1857)
- Elizabeth Goudge (1900–1984), English novelist
- Rev. James Grahame (1765–1811), Scottish priest and poet
- Rev. John Galbraith Graham (1921–2013), British priest and crossword compiler
- George Grant (1918–1988), Canadian Conservative philosopher, professor, social critic and Canadian nationalist
- John Green (b. 1977), American author, philanthropist, podcaster and YouTuber
- T. H. Green (1836–1882), English philosopher, political radical, temperance reformer and a member of the British idealism movement
- Francis Grenfell, 1st Baron Grenfell (1841–1925), British Army officer
- Most Rev. Edmund Grindal (c. 1519–1583), English Archbishop (72nd Archbishop of Canterbury 1576–1583, Archbishop of York 1570–1576 and Bishop of London 1559–1570)
- Most Rev. Alexander Viets Griswold (1766–1843), American bishop (5th Presiding Bishop of the Episcopal Church 1836–1843, Bishop of Massachusetts 1811–1843 and Bishop of Rhode Island 1811–1843)
- Most Rev. Frank Griswold (1937–2023), American bishop (25th Presiding Bishop of the Episcopal Church 1998–2006, Bishop of Chicago 1987–1998 and Coadjutor Bishop of Chicago 1985–1987)
- Bear Grylls (b. 1974), British adventurer, writer, television presenter, former SAS trooper and survival expert
- Rev. Malcolm Guite (b. 1957), English poet, academic, priest and singer-songwriter
- Rt. Rev. Faik Ibrahim Haddad (1914–2001), Palestinian bishop (Bishop in Jerusalem 1976–1984)
- Chuck Hagel (b. 1946), American military veteran and former Republican Politician who served as the 24th United States Secretary of Defence (2013–2015)
- Rev. Stephen Hales (1677–1761), English clergyman and scientist
- Edmond Halley (1656–1742), English astronomer, mathematician and physicist
- James Halliwell-Phillipps (1820–1889), English writer, Shakespearean scholar, antiquarian and collector of English nursery rhymes and fairy tales
- Rt. Rev. Renn Hampden (1793–1868), English bishop (Bishop of Hereford 1848–1868)
- Most Rev. Clive Handford (b. 1937), English bishop (President Bishop of the Episcopal Church in Jerusalem and the Middle East 2002–2007, Bishop in Cyprus and the Gulf 1997–2007, Bishop of Warwick 1990–1996 and Archdeacon of Nottingham 1984–1990)
- Dame Diana Reader Harris (1912–1996), English educator, school principal and public figure
- William Henry Harrison (1773–1841), American military officer and Politician (9th President of the United States March 4, 1841 – April 4, 1841) shortest serving president in US history and the first US president to die in office
- Prince Harry, Duke of Sussex (b. 1984), British author, member of the British royal family
- William Dodd Hathaway (1924–2013), American lawyer, Democratic Politician, and WWII US Army Air Corps Veteran
- Dame Olivia de Havilland (1916–2020), British-American-French actress
- Robert Stephen Hawker (1803–1875), British priest, poet, antiquarian and reputed eccentric (converted to Catholicism on his deathbed)
- Felicia Hemans (1793–1835), English poet
- Thomas A. Hendricks (1819–1885), American lawyer and Democratic Politician (21st Vice President of the United States and 16th Governor of Indiana)
- Henrietta of England (1644–1670), youngest daughter of Charles I and his wife Henrietta Maria of France, Duchess of Orléans (baptised Anglican, but raised as a Catholic)
- Henry VIII (1491–1547), King of England and Ireland (first monarch to declare himself Supreme Head of the Church of England)
- Henry Frederick, Prince of Wales (1594–1612), eldest son of James VI and I and his wife Anne of Denmark and heir apparent to the thrones of Scotland, England and Ireland
- G. A. Henty (1832–1902), English novelist and war correspondent
- John Abraham Heraud (1799–1887), English journalist and poet
- George Herbert (1593–1633), Welsh-born English poet, orator and Anglican priest
- Rev. Robert Herrick (1591–1674), English lyric poet and cleric
- Most Rev. Thomas Herring (1693–1757), English Archbishop (84th Archbishop of Canterbury 1747–1757, Archbishop of York 1743–1747, Bishop of Bangor 1737–1743 and Dean of Rochester 1732–1743)
- Charlton Heston (1923–2008), American actor and activist
- Paul Hewson aka Bono (b. 1960), Irish singer-songwriter and activist
- Peter Heylin or Heylyn (1599–1662), English clergyman and author of many polemical, historical, political and theological tracts
- Sir Geoffrey Hill (1932–2016), English poet
- Most Rev. John Hines (1910–1997), American bishop (22nd Presiding Bishop of the Episcopal Church 1965–1974, Bishop of Texas 1955–1965 and Bishop Coadjutor of Texas 1945–1955)
- Ian Hislop (b. 1960), British author, journalist, satirist and TV personality
- Peter Hitchens (b. 1951), English author and journalist
- Rt. Rev. John Henry Hobart (1775–1830), American bishop (3rd Episcopal Bishop of New York 1816–1830 and Assistant Bishop of New York 1811–1816)
- Thomas Hobbes (1588–1679), English philosopher
- Canon Percy Holbrook (1859–1946), English clergyman
- John Holden (1882–1949), British missionary bishop (Bishop of West Szechwan 1936–1937)
- Very Rev. Walter Hook (1798–1875), English clergyman (Dean of Chichester 1859–1875)
- Robert Hooke (1635–1703), English scientist, architect and polymath
- Rev. Richard Hooker (1554–1600), English priest and theologian of major importance
- Dave Hope (b. 1949), American bass guitarist and Anglican priest (Anglican Mission in America)
- James Hope-Scott (1812–1873), British barrister and former Tractarian (converted to Catholicism in 1851 with Cardinal Manning)
- Rev. Gerard Manley Hopkins (1844–1889), English priest and poet (he converted to Catholicism in 1866)
- Most Rev. John Henry Hopkins (1792–1868), Irish-American bishop (8th Presiding Bishop of the Episcopal Church 1865–1868 and Bishop of Vermont 1832–1868)
- Frank Houghton (1894–1972), English missionary bishop and author (Bishop of East Szechwan 1936–1940)
- Charles Howard, 1st Earl of Carlisle (1628–1685), English military officer and politician (converted in 1645 from Catholicism)
- Most Rev. William Howley (1766–1848), English Archbishop (90th Archbishop of Canterbury 1828–1848 and Bishop of London 1813–1828)
- Thomas Hughes (1822–1896), English lawyer, judge, politician, author and Christian Socialist
- Rev. Robert Alfred Humble (1864–1929), English priest
- James Otis Sargent Huntington (1854–1935), American Episcopal priest and monk, who founded the Order of the Holy Cross an Anglican Benedictine monastic order
- Most Rev. Matthew Hutton (1693–1758), English Archbishop (85th Archbishop of Canterbury 1757–1758, Archbishop of York 1747–1757 and Bishop of Bangor 1743–1747)
- Very Rev. William Holden Hutton (1860–1930), English clergyman and historian (Dean of Winchester 1919–1930)
- Rt. Rev. Carolyn Tanner Irish (1940–2021), American bishop (10th Episcopal Bishop of Utah 1996–2010)
- Molly Ivins (1944–2007), American newspaper columnist, author and political commentator
- Andrea Jaeger (b. 1965), American tennis player who became an Anglican Dominican nun in 2006
- Alphonso Jackson (b. 1945), American Republican Politician
- James VI & I (1566–1625), King of Scotland, England and Ireland
- James VII & II (1633–1701), King of Scotland, England and Ireland (he converted to Catholicism in 1668 or 1669)
- James Mountbatten-Windsor, Earl of Wessex (b. 2007), member of the British Royal family
- M. R. James (1862–1936), English medievalist scholar and author
- P. D. James (1920–2014), English novelist and life peer
- Most Rev. Katharine Jefferts Schori (b. 1954), American bishop (26th Presiding Bishop and Primate of the Episcopal Church 2006–2015)
- Rt. Rev. Charles Edward Jenkins III (1951–2021), American bishop (10th Bishop of Louisiana 1998–2009)
- Edward Jenner (1749–1823), English physician, scientist, pioneer of vaccines and creator of the smallpox vaccine (the world's first vaccine)
- Rt. Rev. John Jewel (1522–1571), English bishop (Bishop of Salisbury 1559–1571)
- Richard Paul Jodrell (1745–1831), English classical scholar and playwright
- Very Rev. Jeffrey John (b. 1953), Welsh clergyman (Dean of St Albans 2004–2021)
- Boris Johnson (b. 1964), British Politician and writer (Prime Minister of the UK 2019–2022, MP for Uxbridge & South Ruislip 2015–2023 and Mayor of London 2008–2016) baptised Catholic and confirmed in the Church of England
- Lady Bird Johnson (1912–2007), American businesswoman and First Lady of the United States (1963–1969)
- Hewlett Johnson (1874–1966), English priest and Christian Communist
- Samuel Johnson (1709–1784), English writer and lexicographer
- Absalom Jones (1746–1818), African-American abolitionist and clergyman
- Trevor Jones (priest) (b. 1948), British clergyman
- William Jones of Nayland (1726–1800), British clergyman and author
- Ben Jonson (1572–1637), English poet, playwright and actor
- Rev. Benjamin Jowett (1817–1893), English priest, writer and classical scholar
- Bernard Judd (1918–1999), Australian priest
- Most Rev. William Juxson (1582–1663), English Archbishop (77th Archbishop of Canterbury 1660–1663, Bishop of London 1633–1646, Bishop elect of Hereford 1633 and Dean of Worcester 1627–1633)

== K to O ==
- Most Rev. Samir Kafity (1932–2015), Palestinian Anglican bishop (Bishop-in-Residence at St. Bartholomew's Episcopal Church, Poway 1999–2015, President Bishop of the Episcopal Church in Jerusalem and the Middle East 1985–1995, Bishop in Jerusalem 1984–1997 and Coadjutor Bishop in Jerusalem 1982–1984)
- Jan Karon (b. 1937), American novelist
- Sheila Kaye-Smith (1887–1956), English writer (she converted to Catholicism with her husband in 1929)
- Rev. John Keble (1792–1866), English priest and poet associated with the Oxford movement
- Garrison Keillor (b. 1942), American author, singer, humorist, voice actor and radio personality
- Rt. Rev. Jackson Kemper (1789–1870), American bishop and missionary (Bishop of Wisconsin 1859–1870 and Missionary Bishop 1835–1859)
- Rt. Rev. Thomas Ken (1637–1711), English bishop (Bishop of Bath and Wells 1685–1690 and Canon of Winchester 1669–1685)
- Cecil Chetwynd Kerr, Marchioness of Lothian (1808–1877), British noblewoman and philanthropist (she converted to Catholicism in 1851)
- Harriette A. Keyser (1841–1936), American industrial reformer, social worker and author
- Rev. Charles Kingsley (1819–1875), English broad church priest, professor, social reformer, novelist, poet and Christian Socialist
- Jack Kingston (b. 1955), American businessman, lobbyist and Republican Politician
- Ronald Knox (1888–1957), English priest, author, theologian and radio broadcaster (converted to Catholicism in 1917)
- Dave Kopay (b. 1942), American football running back in the NFL
- Ini Kopuria (d. 1945), Soloman Islander Police officer and founder of the Melanesian Brotherhood
- Fiorello La Guardia (1882–1947), American attorney, military officer and Republican Politician
- Rt. Rev. Arthur Lake (1569–1626), English bishop (Bishop of Bath & Wells 1616–1626 and Dean of Worcester 1608–1616)
- Most Rev. Cosmo Gordon Lang, 1st Baron Lang of Lambeth (1864–1945), the third Scottish Archbishop of Canterbury and second to retire from office (97th Archbishop of Canterbury 1928–1942, Archbishop of York 1909–1928 and Bishop of Stepney 1901–1909)
- Most Rev. William Laud (1573–1645), English Archbishop, theologian and martyr who was executed during the English Civil War (76th Archbishop of Canterbury 1633–1645, Dean of Gloucester 1616–1621, Bishop of St Davids 1621–1627, Bishop of Bath & Wells 1626–1628 and Bishop of London 1628–1633)
- Vice-Adm. Sir Timothy Laurence (b. 1955), English Royal Navy officer and equerry to Elizabeth II (1986–1989)
- Most Rev. Alfred Lee (1807–1887), American bishop (10th Presiding Bishop of the Episcopal Church 1884–1887 and Bishop of Delaware 1841–1887)
- Henry "Light Horse Harry" Lee III (1756–1818), Revolutionary War officer, 9th Governor of Virginia, eulogist of George Washington and father of Robert E. Lee
- Robert E. Lee (1807–1870), American Confederate general
- C. S. Lewis (1898–1963), British writer, literary scholar, Christian apologist and lay theologian (he was an atheist as an adult and then rejoined the church)
- Rt. Rev. Michael Lewis (b. 1953), English bishop (Bishop of Middleton 1999–2007, Bishop of Cyprus and the Gulf 2007–2023 and President Bishop and Primate of Jerusalem and the Middle East 2019–2023)
- Most Rev. Arthur Lichtenberger (1900–1968), American bishop (21st Presiding Bishop of the Episcopal Church 1958–1964 and Bishop of Missouri 1952–1959)
- Henry Parry Liddon (1829–1890), English theologian and Dean Ireland's Professor of the Exegesis of Holy Scripture at Oxford
- Blanche Lincoln (b. 1960), American Democratic Politician and Senator
- Anne Lister (1791–1840), English diarist and landowner dubbed "the first modern lesbian"
- Bob Livingston (b. 1943), American lobbyist and Republican Politician (raised as a Roman Catholic, then an Episcopalian he later returned to Catholicism)
- Rt. Rev. Charles Lloyd (1784–1829), English bishop and professor (Bishop of Oxford 1827–1829 and Regius Professor of Divinity at Oxford) associated with the Hackney Phalanx
- John Locke (1632–1704), English philosopher and physician
- William Lockhart (1820–1892), English priest and writer (initially associated with the Oxford movement, he converted to Catholicism in 1843)
- Most Rev. Adam Loftus (c. 1533–1605), English Archbishop who served as Archbishop of Armagh (1562–1567) and Archbishop of Dublin (1567–1605)
- Most Rev. Charles Longley (1794–1868), English Archbishop (92nd Archbishop of Canterbury 1862–1868, Archbishop of York 1860–1862, Bishop of Durham 1856–1860 and Bishop of Ripon 1836–1856)
- Rt. Rev. John Lonsdale (1788–1867), English bishop and academic (Bishop of Lichfield 1843–1867 and Principal of King's College, London)
- Richard Lovelace (1617–1657), English Cavalier poet
- Charles Fuge Lowder (1820–1880), English priest and founder of the Society of the Holy Cross
- John Malcolm Forbes Ludlow (1821–1911), English barrister, journalist and Christian Socialist
- George Lukins (1743/1744-????), English tailor infamous for his alleged demonic possession and subsequent exorcism
- Henry Francis Lyte (1793–1847), Scottish Anglican divine, hymnodist, priest and poet
- Thomas Macaulay, 1st Baron Macaulay (1800–1859), British historian, poet and Whig politician (Secretary at War 1839–1841, Paymaster General 1846–1848, Secretary to the Board of Control 1832–1833, Member of Parliament for Calne 1830–1832, Member of Parliament for Leeds 1832–1834, and Member of Parliament for Edinburgh 1839–1847 and 1852–1856)
- Rev. Diarmaid MacCulloch (b. 1951), English academic, clergyman and historian
- Sir John A. Macdonald (1815–1891) Scottish-Canadian lawyer, soldier, politician and 1st Prime Minister of Canada (convert from Presbyterianism)
- Arthur Machen (1863–1947), Welsh author and mystic (in his later years he converted to Catholicism)
- Rev. John Macquarrie, Scottish priest, philosopher and theologian
- James Madison (1751–1836), American Founding Father, diplomat, military officer, statesman and 4th President of the United States (1809–1817), the “Father of the Constitution” and the key champion and author of the United States Bill of Rights
- Alfred Thayer Mahan (1840–1914), American historian, military strategist, military theorist and US Navy officer
- Most Rev. Ghais Malik (1930–2016), Egyptian bishop (President Bishop of the Episcopal Church in Jerusalem and the Middle East 1995–2000 and Bishop of Egypt 1985–2000)
- Rev. Thomas Robert Malthus (1766–1834), English clergyman, economist and scholar in the fields of demography and Political economy
- Most Rev. Charles Manners-Sutton (1755–1828), English Archbishop (89th Archbishop of Canterbury 1805–1828,Bishop of Norwich 1792–1805, Dean of Peterborough 1791–1792 and Dean of Windsor in commendam 1794–1805)
- Henry Edward Manning (1808–1892), English clergyman and writer (Archdeacon of Chichester 1840–1851) formerly an Anglican associated with the Oxford movement, he converted to Catholicism in 1851 and subsequently became a Catholic priest (1851–1875), Cardinal (1875–1892) and Archbishop of Westminster (1865–1892)
- Richard Mant (1776–1848), English bishop, Churchman and writer (Bishop of Killaloe and Kilfenora 1820–1823, Bishop of Down and Connor 1823–1848 and Bishop of Down, Connor and Dromore 1842–1848)
- Guglielmo Marconi, 1st Marquis of Marconi (1874–1937), Italian inventor, electrical engineer, physicist, politician and radio pioneer
- Princess Margaret, Countess of Snowdon (1930–2002), daughter of George VI and Queen Elizabeth the Queen Mother, sister of Elizabeth II and member of the British royal family
- Rev. Charles Marriott (1811–1858), British priest and leader in the Oxford movement
- Sir Paul Marshall (b. 1959), British hedge fund manager, philanthropist and media proprietor
- Mary II (1662–1694), Queen of England, Scotland and Ireland and Princess consort of Orange
- Charles Mathias (1922–2010), American attorney, Republican Politician and US Navy officer
- Rev. F. D. Maurice (1805–1872), English priest, theologian, writer and one of the founders of Christian Socialism (the son of a Unitarian minister, he was baptised in the Church of England in 1831 and was subsequently ordained as a deacon in 1834 and a priest in 1835)
- Theresa May, Baroness May of Maidenhead (b. 1956), British Conservative politician and life peeress (Prime Minister of the UK 2016–2019, Leader of the Conservative Party 2016–2019, Secretary of State for the Home Department 2010–2016, Minister for Women and Equalities 2010–2012, Chair of the Conservative Party 2002–2003, MP for Maidenhead 1997–2024 and Member of the House of Lords 2024–Present)
- Rev. John Mbiti (1931–2019), Kenyan Christian philosopher and writer
- John McCain (1936–2018), American US Navy officer, Republican Politician and Senator, (former Anglican, he became a practicing Baptist)
- Alister McGrath (b. 1953), Northern Irish native theologian, priest, intellectual historian and Christian apologist
- Victor McLaglen (1886–1959), British-American actor and boxer
- Rt. Rev. John Medley (1804–1892), English -Canadian bishop (Bishop of Fredericton 1845–1892, Prebendary of Exeter Cathedral 1842–1845 and Vicar of St. Thomas's Church, Exeter 1838–1845)
- Meghan, Duchess of Sussex (b. 1981), American former actress and member of the British Royal family (converted in 2018)
- Thomas Middleton (1580–1627), English playwright and poet
- John Milbank (b. 1952), English theologian and emeritus Professor in the Department of Theology and Religious Studies at the University of Nottingham
- Rev. Joseph Miller (1874–????) British former Congregational Minister who became an Anglican priest
- St. George Jackson Mivart (1827–1900), English biologist (converted to Catholicism in 1845)
- Bernard Mizeki (1861–1896), East African Anglican missionary and martyr
- James Monroe (1758–1831), American Founding Father, statesman, diplomat, lawyer and military officer and 5th President of the United States (1817–1825)
- Elizabeth Moon (b. 1945), American science fiction and fantasy writer
- Rt. Rev. Benjamin Moore (1748–1816), American bishop (Episcopal Bishop of New York 1815–1816)
- Most Rev. John Moore (1730–1805), English Archbishop (88th Archbishop of Canterbury, Bishop of Bangor 1774–1783 and Dean of Canterbury 1771–1775)
- J. P. Morgan (1837–1913), American financier, investment banker and art collector
- John Brande Morris (1812–1880), English priest and theologian (he converted to Catholicism in 1846)
- Edward Morrow (1934–2003), South African Anglican priest and anti-apartheid activist
- Most Rev. Iraj Mottahedeh (b. 1932), Iranian retired bishop (Honorary Assistant Bishop, Dioceses of Lichfield and of Birmingham 2005–Present, Interim Bishop, in Iran 2002–2005, President Bishop of the Episcopal Church in Jerusalem and the Middle East 2000–2002, Bishop in Iran 1990–2002 and Assistant Bishop in Iran 1985–1990)
- Andrew Mountbatten-Windsor (b. 1960), member of the British royal family
- Most Rev. Howard Mowll (1890–1958), Australian Bishop of Western China (1925–1933) and Archbishop of Sydney (1933–1958)
- James Bowling Mozley (1813–1878), English clergyman, theologian and writer associated with the Oxford movement
- Thomas Mozley (1806–1893), English clergyman and writer associated with the Oxford movement
- Rt. Rev. Dame Sarah Mullally (b. 1962), British Archbishop, former nurse and first female Archbishop of Canterbury (Archbishop designate of Canterbury 2025–Present, Bishop of London 2018–Present and Bishop of Crediton 2015–2018)
- Francis Joseph Mullin (1906–1997), American academic and the seventh president of Shimer College
- Most Rev. John Gardner Murray (1857–1929), American bishop (16th Presiding Bishop of the Episcopal Church 1926–1929, Bishop of Maryland 1911–1929 and Coadjutor Bishop of Maryland 1909–1911)
- Most Rev. Hosam Naoum (b. 1974), Israeli Archbishop (Anglican Archbishop of Jerusalem 2021–Present and President Bishop of the Episcopal Church in Jerusalem and the Middle East 2023–Present)
- Michael Nazir-Ali (b. 1949), Pakistani-British former Anglican bishop (converted to Catholicism in 2021)
- Rev. John Mason Neale (1818–1866), English priest, scholar and hymnwriter
- John Henry Newman (1801–1890), English academic, clergyman, historian, philosopher, poet, theologian and writer (a key figure in the Oxford movement, he later converted to Catholicism in 1845)
- Ursula Niebuhr (1907–1997), Anglo-American academic and theologian
- Florence Nightingale (1820–1910), English nurse, social reformer, statistician and the founder of modern nursing
- Albert Jay Nock (1870–1945), American Libertarian, writer, social theorist and critic
- Henry Handley Norris (1771–1850), English clergyman and theologian associated with the Hackney Phalanx
- Eleanor Holmes Norton (b. 1937), American lawyer, Democratic politician and human rights activist
- John Julius Norwich (1929–2018), English popular historian, travel writer and television personality
- Sabelo Stanley Ntwasa, South African priest and anti-apartheid activist
- Henry Oldenburg (1618–1677), German diplomat, theologian, philosopher and scientist
- Ashley Olsen (b. 1986), American businesswoman, fashion designer and actress
- Rt. Rev. Benjamin Treadwell Onderdonk (1791–1861), American bishop (4th Bishop of New York 1830–1861, suspended in 1845 and never restored)
- John Michael "Ozzy" Osbourne (1948–2025), English musician and media personality
- Harry Oppenheimer (1908–2000), South African businessman, industrialist and philanthropist (convert from Judaism)
- George Orwell (1903–1950), English author and journalist
- John Ostrander (b. 1949), American comic book writer
- Sir Frederick Ouseley, 2nd Baronet (1825–1889), English composer, musicologist, organist and priest
- George Owen of Henllys (1552–1613), Welsh antiquarian, author and naturalist

== P to T ==
- John Page (c. 1627–1692), English-born American planter, merchant and slave trader (founder of one of the First Families of Virginia)
- John Page (1743–1808), American Democratic-Republican politician and member of one of the First Families of Virginia
- Mann Page (1749–1781), American lawyer, planter, Democratic-Republican politician and member of one of the First Families of Virginia
- Thomas Nelson Page (1853–1922), American diplomat, lawyer, Democratic politician, writer and member of one of the First Families of Virginia
- Rt. Rev. Francis Paget (1851–1911), English bishop, author and theologian (Bishop of Oxford 1901–1911)
- Rev. William Paley (1743–1805), English clergyman, Christian apologist and Utilitarian philosopher
- Rev. William Palmer (1803–1885), English priest, liturgical scholar and theologian
- William Palmer (1811–1879), English priest, ecumenist and theologian (he later converted to Catholicism in 1855)
- Horatio Parker (1863–1919), American composer, organist and teacher
- Most Rev. Matthew Parker (1504–1575), English Archbishop (71st Archbishop of Canterbury 1559–1575 and Dean of Lincoln 1552–1554)
- Catherine Parr (1512–1548), Queen consort of England and Ireland (1543–1547)
- Alan Paton (1903–1988), South African novelist and anti-apartheid activist
- Sir John Patteson (1790–1861), English judge
- George S. Patton (1885–1945), American US Army general
- Charles William Pearson (1847–1917), British missionary
- Percy Pennybacker (1895–1963), American civil engineer
- Samuel Pepys (1633–1703), English writer and Tory politician (Member of Parliament for Harwich 1679 and 1685–1689, Member of Parliament for Castle Rising 1673–1679 and President of the Royal Society 1684–1686)
- Most Rev. James De Wolf Perry (1871–1947), American bishop (18th Presiding Bishop of the Episcopal Church 1930–1937 and Bishop of Rhode Island 1911–1946)
- Prince Philip, Duke of Edinburgh (1921–2021), husband and consort of Elizabeth II (converted from Greek Orthodoxy in 1947)
- Katherine Philips (1631/32–1664), Anglo-Welsh poet and translator
- Autumn Phillips (b. 1978), Canadian-born British ex-wife of Peter Phillips
- Mark Phillips (b. 1948), English Olympic gold medal-winning equestrian, military officer and the first husband of Anne, Princess Royal
- Peter Phillips (b. 1977), British businessman and member of the British Royal family
- Franklin Pierce (1804–1869), American lawyer, military officer, Democratic Politician and 14th President of the United States
- Rev. Jonas Pilling (1855–1926), English clergyman
- Charles Cotesworth Pinckney (1746–1825), American Founding Father, South Carolina Revolutionary War veteran, delegate to the Constitutional Convention, and Federalist Party presidential candidate
- Edward Pococke (1604–1691), English orientalist and Biblical scholar
- Rt. Rev. Richard Pococke (1704–1765), English bishop, traveller and travel writer (Bishop of Ossory 1756–1765 and Bishop of Meath 1765)
- Colin Podmore (b. 1960), Cornish ecclesiastical historian and official
- Arthur T. Polhill-Turner (1862–1935), English missionary one of the Cambridge Seven
- Cecil H. Polhill-Turner (1860–1938), British missionary and one of the Cambridge Seven
- Canon William Pope (1825–1905), English priest and follower of John Henry Newman (converted to Catholicism in 1853)
- Most Rev. John Potter (c. 1674–1747), English Archbishop (83rd Archbishop of Canterbury 1737–1747 and Bishop of Oxford 1715–1737)
- Anthony Powell (1905–2000), English novelist
- Colin Powell (1937–2021), American diplomat and US Army general (65th United States Secretary of State 2001–2005, 12th Chairman of the Joint Chiefs of Staff 1989–1993, 15th United States National Security Advisor 1987–1989 and United States Deputy National Security Advisor 1986–1987)
- Enoch Powell (1912–1998), British classical scholar, military officer, WWII veteran, poet and politician (Conservative MP for Wolverhampton South West 1950–1974, Ulster Unionist MP for South Down 1974–1987, Financial Secretary to the Treasury 1957–1958, Minister of Health 1960–1963 and Shadow Secretary of State for Defence 1965–1968)
- Sir Montagu Proctor-Beauchamp, 7th Baronet (1860–1939), British missionary and one of the Cambridge Seven
- Most Rev. Samuel Provoost (1742–1815), American bishop (3rd Presiding Bishop of the Episcopal Church 1792–1795 and Bishop of New York 1787–1815)
- Augustus Pugin (1812–1852), English architect, artist, critic and designer (he converted to Catholicism in 1834)
- Rev. Edward Bouverie Pusey (1800–1882), English clergyman, Regius Professor of Hebrew at Oxford and one of the leaders of the Oxford Movement
- Ann Radcliffe (1764–1823), English novelist, pioneer of Gothic fiction and minor poet
- Sir Walter Raleigh (1552–1618), English explorer, statesman, soldier and writer (Lord Warden of the Stanneries 1584–1603, Vice-Admiral of Devon 1585–1603, Lord Lieutenant of Cornwall 1587–1603, Captain of the Yeomen of the Guard 1586–1592 and 1597–1603, Custos Rotulorum of Dorset 1598–1603, Governor of Jersey 1600–1603, Member of Parliament for Devonshire 1584–1585 and 1586–1587, Member of Parliament for Dorset 1597–1598 and Member of Parliament for Cornwall 1601)
- Rev. James Ramsay, Scottish priest, abolitionist and ship's surgeon
- Most Rev. Michael Ramsey, Baron Ramsey of Canterbury (1904–1988), British Archbishop and life peer (100th Archbishop of Canterbury 1961–1974, Archbishop of York 1956–1961 and Bishop of Durham 1952–1956)
- John Randolph of Roanoke (1773–1833), American Virginian Congressman, U. S. Minister to Russia and planter
- Thomas Randolph (1605–1635), English poet and dramatist
- Basil Rathbone (1892–1967), English actor and military officer
- Rev. Can. George Rawlinson (1812–1902), English clergyman, Christian theologian and historian
- George Read (1733–1798), American Politician and signer of the Declaration of Independence from Delaware and a delegate to the U.S. Constitutional Convention of 1787
- Martin Rees, Baron Rees of Ludlow (b. 1942), British cosmologist and astrophysicist
- Rev. George F. Regas (1930–2021), American Episcopal Church priest (Rector Emeritus of All Saints Church, Pasadena)
- Prince Richard, Duke of Gloucester (b. 1944), member of the British Royal family
- Rev. William Upton Richards (1811–1873), English priest associated with the Oxford movement
- Sir John Richardson (1771–1841), English lawyer and judge
- Samuel Richardson (1689–1761), English writer and printer
- Rev. Calvin Robinson (b. 1985), British priest, conservative political commentator, writer and broadcaster (converted to Old Catholicism in 2023 and returned to Anglicanism in 2024)
- Rt. Rev. Gene Robinson (b. 1947), American retired bishop (Bishop of New Hampshire 2004–2013 and Bishop Coadjutor of New Hampshire 2003–2004)
- Sir Thomas Roe (1581–1644), English diplomat
- Eleanor Roosevelt (1884–1962), American activist, diplomat and wife of Franklin Roosevelt and "First Lady of the World"
- Franklin Delano Roosevelt (1882–1945), American Democratic Politician and 32nd President of the United States (1933–1945)
- Dante Gabriel Rossetti (1828–1882), English artist, poet and translator
- Christina Rossetti (1830–1894), English poet
- Maria Francesca Rossetti (1827–1876), English author and nun
- Most Rev. Sean Rowe (b. 1975), American bishop (28th Presiding Bishop of the Episcopal Church 2024–Present, Bishop of Northwestern Pennsylvania 2007–2024, Provisional Bishop of Bethlehem 2014–2018 and Provisional Bishop of Western New York 2007–2024)
- J. K. Rowling (b. 1965), British author and philanthropist
- Rev. Thomas James Rowsell (1816–1894), English High Church priest who served as Honorary Chaplain to Queen Victoria (1866 –1869), Chaplain in Ordinary (1869–1894), Deputy Clerk of the Closet (1879–1894) and Canon of Westminster (1881–1894)
- Rt. Rev. Andrew Rumsey (b. 1968), British Anglican bishop (Bishop of Ramsbury 2019–Present)
- Most Rev. Robert Runcie, Baron Runcie (1921–2000), English Archbishop (102nd Archbishop of Canterbury 1980–1991 and Bishop of St. Albans 1970–1980)
- Henry Sacheverell (1674–1724), English clergyman and Tory
- Thomas Sackville, 1st Earl of Dorset (1536–1608), English statesman, poet and dramatist
- Ignatius Sancho (c. 1729–1780), British abolitionist, shopkeeper, writer and composer
- Most Rev. William Sancroft (1617–1693), English Archbishop (79th Archbishop of Canterbury 1677–1690 and Dean of St. Paul's 1664–1678)
- Margaret Sanger (1879–1966), American birth control activist, nurse, sex educator and writer
- Rt. Rev. Douglas Sargent (1907–1979), English missionary to Sichuan and third Bishop of Selby
- Dorothy L. Sayers (1893–1957), English crime writer, poet, playwright, essayist, translator and Christian humanist
- Sir Roger Scruton (1944–2020), English conservative, philosopher, writer and social critic
- Most Rev. Samuel Seabury (1729–1796), American bishop and Loyalist (2nd Presiding Bishop of the Episcopal Church 1789–1792, Bishop of Connecticut 1784–1796 and Bishop of Rhode Island 1790–1796)
- Most Rev. Thomas Secker (1693–1768), English Archbishop (86th Archbishop of Canterbury 1758–1768, Bishop of Oxford 1737–1758 and Bishop of Bristol 1735–1737)
- Sir John Robert Seeley (1834–1895), English Liberal historian and political essayist
- Rt. Rev. John Sentamu, Baron Sentamu (b. 1949), Ugandan-British retired Archbishop and life peer (Archbishop of York 2005–2020, Bishop of Birmingham 2002–2005 and Bishop of Stepney 1996–2002)
- Anna Seward (1742–1809), English Romantic poet
- Thomas Shadwell (c. 1642–1692), English poet and playwright (Poet Laureate of England 1689–1692)
- William Shakespeare (1564–1616), English playwright, poet and actor
- Most Rev. Gilbert Sheldon (1598–1677), English Archbishop (78th Archbishop of Canterbury 1663–1677, Bishop of London 1660–1663 and Canon of Gloucester 1633 –1658)
- Most Rev. Henry Sherrill (1890–1980), American bishop (20th Presiding Bishop of the Episcopal Church 1947–1958, Bishop of Massachusetts 1930–1947 and Coadjutor Bishop of Pennsylvania 1928–1930)
- Rev. Charles Simeon (1759–1836), English Evangelical Anglican cleric
- Wallis Simpson (later Duchess of Windsor)(1896–1986), American socialite and wife of Prince Edward, Duke of Windsor (prior to abdication Edward VIII)
- C. H. Sisson (1914–2003), British critic of the Church of England, poet, translator and writer
- Christopher Smart (1722–1771), English poet
- Most Rev. Benjamin B. Smith (1794–1884), American bishop (9th Presiding Bishop of the Episcopal Church 1868–1884 and Bishop of Kentucky 1832–1884)
- Cordwainer Smith (1913–1966), American science fiction writer, military officer, East Asia scholar and psychological warfare expert
- Song Cheng-tsi (1892–1955), Sichuanese Anglican Bishop of West Szechwan (1937–1950) and Assistant Bishop of Western China (1929–1936)
- Sophie, Duchess of Edinburgh (b. 1965), British philanthropist and member of the British royal family
- David Souter (b. 1939), American lawyer, jurist and former US Supreme Court Justice (1990–2009)
- Robert Southey (1774–1843), English Romantic poet (Poet Laureate of the United Kingdom 1813–1843)
- Edmund Spenser (1552–1599), English poet
- Rev. William Archibald Spooner (1844–1930), English clergyman and Oxford don
- Rt. Rev. Thomas Sprat (1635–1713), English bishop and writer (Bishop of Rochester 1684–1713 and Dean of Westminster 1683–1713)
- Russell Stannard (1931–2022), British high-energy particle physicist
- Sir Richard Steele (1671–1729), Anglo-Irish writer, playwright, Whig politician and co-founder, with Joseph Addison, of The Spectator
- John Steinbeck (1902–1968), American novelist and war correspondent
- Rev. Laurence Sterne (1713–1768), Anglo-Irish novelist and Anglican clergyman whose best remembered novel is The Life and Opinions of Tristram Shandy, Gentleman
- Sufjan Stevens (b. 1975), American singer, songwriter and multi-instrumentalist
- Ted Stevens (1923–2010), American lawyer, military officer, Republican Politician and Senator
- William Stevens (1732–1807), English hosier, biographer and lay writer
- Edward Stillingfleet (1635–1699), English clergyman and theologian
- Rt. Rev. Mervyn Stockwood (1913–1995), British Anglican bishop (Bishop of Southwark 1959–1980)
- Frederick Streetly (1893–1952), Anglican priest, Archdeacon of Tobago
- Sir Roy Strong (b. 1935), English art historian, museum curator, writer, broadcaster and landscape designer
- Charles Edward Stuart (1720–1788), Jacobite pretender to the thrones of England, Scotland and Ireland (converted from Catholicism in 1750)
- Henry Stuart, Duke of Gloucester (1640–1660), youngest son of Charles I and his wife Henrietta Maria of France
- Charles Studd (1860–1931), English author, cricketer, essayist, missionary and one of the Cambridge Seven
- Rev. William Stukeley (1687–1765), English antiquarian, physician and clergyman
- Sir David Suchet (b. 1946), English actor (converted in 1986)
- Frederick Reginald Pinfold Sumner (1892–1939), English cleric and photographer
- Most Rev. John Bird Sumner (1780–1862), English Archbishop (91st Archbishop of Canterbury 1848–1862, Bishop of Chester 1828–1848 and prebendary of Durham 1819–1828)
- E. W. Swanton (1907–2000), English author, journalist and cricket commentator
- Very Rev. Jonathan Swift (1667–1745), Anglo-Irish clergyman, satirist, essayist, political pamphleteer known for works such as Gulliver's Travels, A Modest Proposal, A Journal to Stella, Drapier's Letters, The Battle of the Books, An Argument Against Abolishing Christianity, and A Tale of a Tub
- Stuart Symington (1901–1988), American businessman, military officer, Democratic Politician and Senator
- Robert A. Taft (1889–1953), American Republican Politician, Senator, lawyer and member of the Taft family
- Most Rev. Archibald Campbell Tait (1811–1882), theologian and first Scottish Archbishop of Canterbury (93rd Archbishop of Canterbury 1868–1882, Bishop of London 1856–1868 and Dean of Carlisle 1849–1856)
- Most Rev. Ethelbert Talbot (1848–1928), American bishop (15th Presiding Bishop of the Episcopal Church 1924–1926, Bishop of Bethlehem 1905–1928, Bishop of Central Pennsylvania 1898–1904 and Bishop of Wyoming 1887–1898)
- Oliver Tambo (1917–1993), South African anti-apartheid politician and revolutionary who served as President of the African National Congress (ANC) from 1967 to 1991
- Nahum Tate (1652–1715), Anglo-Irish poet, playwright, hymnist and lyricist (Poet Laureate of England/Great Britain 1692–1715)
- Rt. Rev. Jeremy Taylor (1613–1667), English Anglican bishop in Ireland and devotional writer (Bishop of Down and Connor 1661–1667)
- Michael Taylor (b. 1944), English butcher and murderer
- Zachary Taylor (1784–1850), American General, Politician and 12th President of the United States (1849–1850)
- Most Rev. Frederick Temple (1821–1902), English Archbishop, academic and teacher (95th Archbishop of Canterbury 1896–1902, Bishop of London 1885–1896 and Bishop of Exeter 1869–1885)
- Most Rev. William Temple (1881–1944), English Archbishop (98th Archbishop of Canterbury 1942–1944, Archbishop of York 1929–1942 and Bishop of Manchester 1921–1929)
- Most Rev. Thomas Tenison (1636–1715), English Archbishop (81st Archbishop of Canterbury 1695–1715 and Bishop of Lincoln 1691–1695)
- Alfred, Lord Tennyson (1809–1892), English poet (Poet Laureate of the United Kingdom 19 November 1850 – 6 October 1892)
- Rev. R. S. Thomas (1913–2000) Welsh Anglican clergyman, poet and Welsh nationalist
- Martin Thornton (1915–1986), British priest and spiritual director known for his writings on ascetical theology
- Most Rev. John Tillotson (1630–1694), English Archbishop (80th Archbishop of Canterbury 1691–1694 and Dean of St. Paul's 1689–1691)
- Sir Nicholas Conyngham Tindal (1776–1846), English lawyer
- Zara Tindall (b. 1981), British equestrian, Olympian, Socialite and member of the British Royal family
- James Henthorn Todd (1805–1869), Irish biblical scholar, educator and historian
- William Gowan Todd (1820–1877), Anglo-Irish clergyman and author (he converted to Catholicism in about 1845)
- Arthur Tooth (1849–1931), English priest noted for Ritualism
- Philip Toynbee (1916–1981), British writer and communist
- Thomas Traherne (c. 1636 or 1638–c. 1674), English clergyman, poet, religious writer and theologian
- Most Rev. Richard Chenevix Trench (1807–1886), Irish Anglican Archbishop and poet (Archbishop of Dublin 1864–1884 and Dean of Westminster 1856–1864)
- Anthony Trollope (1815–1882), English novelist and civil servant
- Most Rev. Henry St. George Tucker (1874–1959), American bishop (19th Presiding Bishop of the Episcopal Church 1938–1946, Bishop of Virginia 1927–1943, Coadjutor Bishop of Virginia 1926–1927, Bishop of Kyoto 1913–1923 and Bishop of Osaka 1912–1923)
- Most Rev. Daniel S. Tuttle (1837–1923), American bishop 13th Presiding Bishop of the Episcopal Church 1903–1923, Bishop of Missouri (1886–1923) and Missionary Bishop of Montana, Idaho and Utah (1866–1886)
- Most Rev. Desmond Tutu (1931–2021), South African Anglican Archbishop, theologian, anti-apartheid and human rights activist (Archbishop of Cape Town 1986–1996, Bishop of Johannesburg 1985–1986 and Bishop of Lesotho 1976–1978)
- Millard Tydings (1890–1961), American attorney, author, Democratic politician, state legislator and US Army officer
- John Tyler (1790–1862), American lawyer, military officer, planter and politician (President of the United States 1841–1845)

== U to Z ==
- Evelyn Underhill (1875–1941), English pacifist, retreat leader, theologian and writer
- Peter van Inwagen (b. 1942), American analytic philosopher and professor
- Henry Vaughan (1621−1695), Welsh Metaphysical poet and translator
- Thomas Vaughan (1621−1666), Welsh alchemist, clergyman and philosopher
- Queen Victoria (1819–1901), Queen of the United Kingdom of Great Britain & Ireland (1837–1901) and Empress of India (1876–1901)
- Jeremy Vine (b. 1965), English journalist and television and radio presenter
- Frederick Augustus Voigt (1892–1957), British author and journalist
- Most Rev. William Wake (1657–1737), English Archbishop (82nd Archbishop of Canterbury 1716–1737, Bishop of Lincoln 1705–1716 and Dean of Exeter 1703–1705)
- Henry A. Wallace (1888–1965), American businessman, farmer, journalist and politician (33rd Vice President of the United States 1941–1945, 10th United States Secretary of Commerce 1945–1946, Chair of the Supply Priorities and Allocations Board 1941–1942, Chair of the Board of Economic Warfare 1940–1943 and 11th United States Secretary of Agriculture 1933–1940)
- Izaak Walton (bapt. 1593 d. 1683), English biographer and writer
- Rev. Keith Ward (b. 1938), English priest, philosopher and theologian
- William George Ward (1812–1882), English mathematician and theologian (converted to Catholicism in 1845)
- Jane Warton (bap. 1724–1809), English writer
- Joseph Warton (1722–1800), English clergyman, academic and literary critic
- Thomas Warton (1728–1790), English literary historian, literary critic and poet (Poet Laureate of Great Britain 1785–1790)
- Thomas Warton the Elder (c. 1688–1745), English clergyman and schoolmaster, father of Thomas Warton, Joseph Warton and Jane Warton
- George Washington (1732–1799), American farmer, Founding Father, independent politician and US Army general (1st President of the United States 1789–1797, 7th Senior Officer of the United States Army 1798–1799, Commander in Chief of the Continental Army 1775–1783, 14th Chancellor of the College of William and Mary 1788–1799, Delegate from Virginia to the Continental Congress 1774–1775 and Member of the Virginia House of Burgesses 1758–1775)
- Sam Waterston (b. 1940), American actor
- Thomas Benjamin Watkins (1856–1933), English Anglican priest
- John James Watson (1767–1839), English clergyman associated with the Hackney Phalanx
- Joshua Watson (1771–1855), English wine merchant, philanthropist and High Church layman associated with the Hackney Phalanx
- Most Rev. Justin Welby (b. 1956), British Archbishop (105th Archbishop of Canterbury 2013–2025, Bishop of Durham 2011–2013 and Dean of Liverpool 2007–2011)
- Rev. Charles Wesley (1707–1788), English clergyman, hymn writer and one of the founders of Methodism
- Rev. John Wesley (1703–1791), English clergyman, evangelist, theologian and one of the founders of Methodism
- Rev. Samuel Wesley (1662–1735), English clergyman, poet, writer and father of Rev. John Wesley and Rev. Charles Wesley the founders of Methodism
- Susanna Wesley (1669–1742), English author, teacher, theologian and the mother of Rev. John Wesley and Rev. Charles Wesley the founders of Methodism (as such she is referred to as the "mother of Methodism)
- Francis Wharton (1820–1889), American legal writer and educator
- Rev. Alfred Wheeler (1865–1949), Australian clergyman and composer of spiritual and Romantic music
- Lurana White (1870–1935), American nun and co-founder of the Society of the Atonement (she converted to Catholicism in 1909 from Episcopalianism)
- Most Rev. William White (1748–1836), American bishop (1st and 4th Presiding Bishop of the Episcopal Church July 28, 1789 – October 3, 1789 and 1795–1836, Bishop of Pennsylvania 1787–1836 and Bishop of Delaware 1787–1828)
- Rev. George Whitefield (1714–1770), English clergyman, preacher and one of the founders of Methodism
- William Whitehead (1715–1785), English poet and playwright (Poet Laureate of Great Britain 1757–1785)
- Most Rev. John Whitgift (c. 1530–1604), English Archbishop (73rd Archbishop of Canterbury 1583–1604 and Bishop of Worcester 1577–1583)
- Henry Wilberforce (1807–1873), English clergyman, editor, journalist, newspaper proprietor, writer and fourth born son of the prominent abolitionist William Wilberforce (he converted to Catholicism in 1850)
- Robert Wilberforce (1802–1857), English clergyman, writer and second born son of the prominent abolitionist William Wilberforce (he converted to Catholicism in 1854)
- Rt. Rev. Samuel Wilberforce (1805–1873), English bishop and third born son of the prominent abolitionist William Wilberforce (Bishop of Winchester 1870–1873, Bishop of Oxford 1845–1869 and Dean of Westminster March–October 1845)
- William Wilberforce (1759–1833), English independent politician and abolitionist
- William Wilberforce (1798–1879), English lawyer, politician and first born son of the prominent abolitionist William Wilberforce (he converted to Catholicism in 1850)
- Oscar Wilde (1854–1900), Irish dramatist and poet (converted on his deathbed to Catholicism)
- William III (1650–1702), King of England, Scotland and Ireland, Prince of Orange and Stadtholder of Holland, Zeeland, Utrecht, Guelders and Overijssel
- William IV (1765–1837), King of the United Kingdom of Great Britain & Ireland and the Kingdom of Hanover (1830–1837)
- William, Prince of Wales (b. 1982), heir apparent to the British throne and member of the British royal family
- Charles Williams (1886–1945), English poet, novelist, playwright, theologian and literary critic
- Rev. Isaac Williams (1802–1865), Welsh priest, writer and prominent member of the Oxford movement
- Most Rev. John Williams (1817–1899), American bishop (11th Presiding Bishop of the Episcopal Church 1887–1889, Bishop of Connecticut 1865–1899 and Assistant Bishop of Connecticut 1851–1865)
- Ralph Vaughan Williams (1872–1958), English composer
- Robin Williams (1951–2014), American actor and comedian
- Rt. Rev. Rowan Williams, Baron Williams of Oystermouth (b. 1950), Welsh Archbishop, theologian and poet (104th Archbishop of Canterbury 2003–2012, Archbishop of Wales 2000–2002 and Bishop of Monmouth 1992–2002)
- John Wilmot, 2nd Earl of Rochester (1647–1680), English courtier, nobleman and poet (he converted on his deathbed)
- Lady Louise Windsor (b. 2003), member of the British Royal family
- Rt. Rev. Colin Winter (1928–1981), Irish-British bishop & anti-apartheid activist (Bishop of Damaraland 1968–1981 and Dean of St George's Cathedral, Windhoek 1964–1968)
- Reese Witherspoon (b. 1976), American actress and producer
- Rev. Nathaniel Woodard (1811–1891), English priest and educator who founded eleven schools and was associated with the Oxford movement
- Rev. Charles Woodmason (c. 1720–1789), clergyman, diarist and missionary to colonial South Carolina
- Rt. Rev. Christopher Wordsworth (1807–1885), English bishop and intellectual (Bishop of Lincoln 1869–1885) associated with the Hackney Phalanx
- William Wordsworth (1770–1850), English Romantic poet (Poet Laureate of the United Kingdom 6 April 1843 – 23 April 1850)
- Rt. Rev. N. T. Wright (b. 1948), English bishop, New Testament scholar and Pauline theologian (Bishop of Durham 2003–2010 and Dean of Lichfield 1994–1999)
- William Butler Yeats (1865–1939), Irish poet, dramatist and writer
- Charlotte Mary Yonge (1823–1901), English novelist associated with the Oxford movement
- Edward Young (1683–1765), English poet
- G. M. Young (1882–1959), English historian

== See also ==
- List of Anglican church composers - includes some non-Anglicans who wrote Anglican church music.
- List of people who have converted to Anglicanism
- Category:Anglican writers
