= John Bowles (author) =

English barrister and pamphleteer

John Bowles (2 October 1753 – 30 October 1819) was an English barrister and pamphleteer. He is known as an opponent of Jacobinism and a prominent conservative writer after the French Revolution.

== Life ==
John Bowles was born 2 October 1753 in London, England, to John Bowles and Mary Carington Bowles. His father, uncle, and grandfather were all successful shopkeeps who sold engraved prints and maps. He apparently lost part of his family's wealth to swindlers, with his father's 1779 will providing him only with a small set allowance to avoid "his submitting again to be gulled, preyed upon, and exhausted by those Monsters in imposture, cruelty, and wickedness who have already drained him of a handsome ffortune and regardless of the Misery and ruin they bring upon him are ready to assail him entising with diabolic artifice and to bubble him out of any bequest I might bestow."

Bowles gained his bachelor of laws degree on 25 March 1779 from the University of Douai and the university licensed him on 11 May 1781. As a law student in London, he frequented the Robin Hood Debating Society. He was a leading committee member and pamphleteer of John Reeves's Association for Preserving Liberty and Property against Republicans and Levellers. He has been described as one of William Pitt the Younger's "subsidized hacks" of the 1790s, a group that included also William Cobbett and John Ireland. He was a government placeman and received secret service funds. He resided at Dulwich in Surrey, where he was a justice of the peace, quorum, and commissioner of bankrupts and the sale of Dutch prizes.

As well as Reeves and the Association, Bowles was connected to High Church groups, including the emergent Hackney Phalanx. George Berkeley (1733–1795), George Horne, and William Jones of Nayland had common aims.

The historian A. D. Harvey has claimed Bowles was "perhaps after Burke the most impressive of the secular conservatives".

He died on 30 October 1819 in Bath, Somerset, and was buried at its Abbey Church.

== Works ==
Bowles wrote more than 33 pamphlets—16 on the British war against revolutionary France—between 1791 and 1817. He attacked Thomas Paine: "...he has not only been long actuated by, but... he formerly gloried in avowing, an implacable animosity and rooted hatred to this country; and that not merely to its Government but to its interests, its welfare, its national character, its national honour, its commercial and naval greatness". His 1792 "Protest against Thomas Paine's Rights of Man" received great popularity when its publication and cheap disseminination was subsidized by a likeminded society that met at the Crown and Anchor Tavern.

When Bowles sent Edmund Burke a collection of his pamphlets against peace with France, Burke wrote to Bowles in March 1796:

You have gone to the bottom of the Subject, with intelligence, perspicuity, force and Eloquence. I really do not know, that I have done any thing more than to follow in your Track. The whole substance of the Cause is to be found from the 14th to the 23rd page of your Further Reflexions. I cannot think my publication necessary. If what you have written will not prevent this Nation from bringing on itself the sure punishment of its faults, nothing I can publish, will be of the least use.

- Considerations on the Respective Rights of Judge and Jury: Particularly upon Trials for Libel (1791).
- A Letter to the Right Hon. Charles James Fox; occasioned by his late Motion in the House of Commons respecting Libels (1791).
- A Protest Against Thomas Paine's Rights of Man (1792).
- A Second Letter to the Right Hon. Charles James Fox, upon the Matter of Liberal (1792).
- Dialogues on the Rights of Britons, between a Farmer, a Sailor, and a Manufacturer—in three parts (1792).
- The Real Grounds of the Present War with France (1793).
- A Short Answer to the Declaration of the Persons Calling Themselves the Friends of the Liberty of the Press (1793).
- Farther Reflections submitted to the Consideration of the Combined Powers (1794).
- Objections to the Continuance of the War Examined and Refuted, 2nd edition (1794).
- Reflections Submitted to the Consideration of the Combined Powers (1794).
- The Dangers of Premature Peace (1795).
- Thoughts on the Origin and Formation of Political Constitutions. Suggested by the recent attempt to frame another new constitution for France (1795).
- Two Letters Addressed to a British Merchant, a short time before the meeting of the new Parliament in 1796 (1795).
- French aggression, proved from Mr Erskine's ‘View of the causes of the war’; with reflections on the original character of the French revolution, and on the supposed durability of the French republic (1797).
- A Third Letter to a British Merchant; containing reflections on the foreign and domestic politics of this country, together with strictures on the conduct of opposition (1797).
- Postscript to ‘The Real Grounds’ (1798).
- Letters of the Ghost of Alfred, Addressed to the Hon. Thomas Erskine, and the Hon. Charles James Fox, on the Occasion of the State Trials at the Close of the Year 1794, and the Beginning of the year 1795 (1798)
- The Retrospect; or, A Collection of Tracts, Published at various periods of the war (1798).
- Reflections on the Political State of Society at the Commencement of the Year 1800 (1800).
- Reflections at the Conclusion of the War, 2nd edition (1801).
- Reflections on the Political and Moral State of Society, at the close of the eighteenth century (1801).
- Remarks on Modern Female Manners, as Distinguished by Indifference to Character, and Indecency of Dress (1802).
- Thoughts on the late General Election, as demonstrative of the Progress of Jacobinism, etc. (1802).
- A View of the Moral State of Society at the Close of the Eighteenth Century (1804).
- A Dispassionate Inquiry into the Best Means of National Safety (1806).

== See also ==
- The Labyrinth of Versailles
