= Joshua Watson =

English wine merchant (1771–1855)

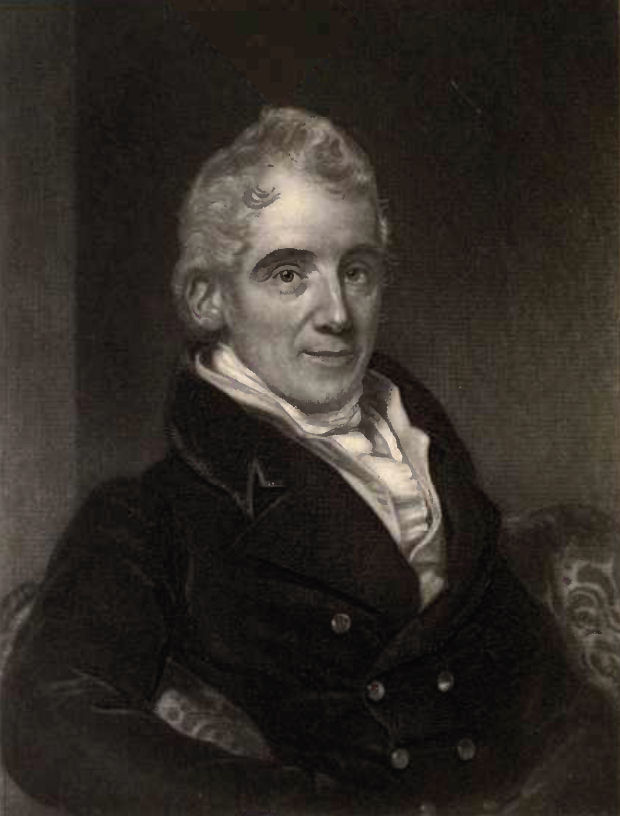
Joshua Watson, from the frontispiece of Churton's memoirs

Joshua Watson (1771–1855) was an English wine merchant, philanthropist, a prominent member of the high church party and of several charitable organisations, who became known as "the best layman in England".

== Life ==
Joshua Watson was born on Tower Hill in the city of London on Ascension day, 9 May 1771. His forefathers were of the hardy and independent race of northern 'statesmen', but his father, John Watson, had come on foot from Cumberland to London in early youth to try his fortunes, and establish himself successfully as a wine merchant on Tower Hill. His mother, Dorothy, born Robson, cousin to the artist, George Fennel Robson, was also from the north of England. John and Dorothy Watson had two sons – John James (1767–1839), who was rector of Hackney for forty years and archdeacon of St. Albans; and Joshua, who followed his father's business. The two brothers remained close throughout their lives.

At the age of ten Joshua was placed under the tuition of Mr Crawford at Newington Butts, and at the age of thirteen was sent to a commercial school kept by Mr Eaton in the city. In 1786 he was taken into his father's counting-house, which had then moved from Tower Hill to Mincing Lane; in 1792, when he came of age, he was admitted a partner. In 1797 he married Mary, the daughter of Thomas Sikes, a banker in Mansion House Street. Her uncle, Charles Daubeny, and her brother, Thomas Sikes, vicar of Guilsborough, who had been at Oxford with Joshua's elder brother, were among the leading churchmen of the day; and Joshua from his early years was brought into contact with other members of the high-church party, of which he afterwards became the virtual leader. Among his early friends and advisers were William Stevens, the disciple and biographer of William Jones of Nayland, and founder of the Club of Nobody's Friends, of which Joshua Watson was an original member; Jonathan Boucher, who became in 1785 vicar of Epsom, where John James Watson had his first curacy; and Sir John Richardson (afterwards a judge in the court of common pleas), who had been a college friend of John James Watson.

Among other friends were Henry Handley Norris, with whom he maintained an unbroken friendship of nearly sixty years, and William Van Mildert, rector of St. Mary-le-Bow in the city (afterwards bishop of Durham). Van Mildert submitted both his Boyle Lectures and his Bampton Lectures to Watson's revision, and was largely guided by his advice in literary matters. Nor was Van Mildert the only man of letters who showed confidence in his literary power. At the house of Van Mildert in Ely Place he met the elder Christopher Wordsworth, master of Trinity College, Cambridge, whom he joined in revising the proof-sheets of Christopher Wordsworth the younger's work, Theophilus Anglicanus. These men were, with Archdeacon Benjamin Harrison and William Rowe Lyall, Watson's chief friends and coadjutors.

Though "not slothful in business," Watson always had his heart in church work, and in 1811 he took a house at Clapton, within five minutes' walk of his brother's rectory at Hackney, and also near Henry Handley Norris. The three worked shoulder to shoulder. Clapton and Hackney became the centre of the various religious and philanthropic projects of the high-church party, and the coterie from which they emanated was called the "Hackney Phalanx". In 1811 the National Society for the Education of the Poor was formed: it originated in a meeting at Watson's house at Clapton, consisting of Watson, Norris, and John Bowles. Watson became its first treasurer, and it grew with marvellous rapidity.

In the same year (1811) Watson and Norris purchased the British Critic to restore it to its original lines as the organ of the high-church party, from which it had somewhat diverged. In 1814 Watson retired from business to devote himself exclusively to works of piety and charity. He never missed any meeting of the Society for Propagation of the Gospel, the Society for Promoting Christian Knowledge, or the National Society, and his counsel was highly valued. He took a deep interest in the colonial church, being an intimate friend of Bishop Middleton of Calcutta, Bishop Inglis of Nova Scotia, Bishop Broughton of Australasia, and subsequently Bishop Selwyn of New Zealand. In 1814 he was appointed, together with his friend Archdeacon Cambridge, treasurer of the Society for Promoting Christian Knowledge, which during his treasurership increased greatly its work and income. About the same time he became secretary of the relief fund for the German sufferers from the Napoleonic Wars. In 1817 the Church Building Society, called at first the Church Room Society, was formed. Watson was largely instrumental in its foundation, drawing up the original resolution. This was quickly followed by a royal commission for church building issued under Lord Liverpool's government. Watson was one of the commissioners, and found the work so engrossing that in 1822 he took a house, No. 6 Park Street, Westminster, where he lived for sixteen years, to be near the scene of his labours.

He was also treasurer of the Clergy Orphan School, which was, perhaps, of all his benevolent schemes, the one nearest to his heart. In 1820 he was with difficulty persuaded by his friend Van Mildert to accept the honorary degree of D.C.L. offered to him by the university of Oxford. His connection with Oxford brought him into contact with Charles Lloyd, the regius professor of divinity, afterwards bishop of Oxford, who said of him, 'I look upon Joshua as the best layman in England.' Some time before he had become associated, through his friend Wordsworth, with the archbishop of Canterbury Charles Manners-Sutton, who appreciated his business talents. Button's successor, Archbishop William Howley, had equal confidence in him. In 1828 he took a leading part in the foundation of King's College London, and was a member of its first council. This brought him into communication with Hugh James Rose, for whom he conceived unbounded admiration. In 1833, layman though he was, he had the task of revising the Clerical Address to the archbishop of Canterbury, expressing attachment to the church, which was drawn up by William Palmer; the Lay Declaration, which immediately followed, was entirely his composition. When the Additional Curates' Society was formed in 1837, Watson was the framer of its constitution and its first treasurer.

In 1838 his only daughter, Mary Sikes Watson, married Henry Michell Wagner, vicar of Brighton, but she died, to her father's grief, two years later, leaving two sons. His wife died in 1831, and his only brother in 1839. After these losses he gave up his house in Park Street, and lived alternately at the house of his wife's sister at Clapton, and his brother's widow at Daventry. In 1842, owing to the infirmities of age, he resigned the treasurership of the National Society, but he still interested himself in religious and philanthropic work; and when the new missionary college of St. Augustine, Canterbury, was founded in 1845, he was one of the council. He retained the treasurership of the Additional Curates' Society until he approached his eighty-third year. He died at Clapton, 30 January 1855, and was buried on 7 Feb in the family vault at Hackney.

Watson was an interesting link between the high-churchmen before, and the high-churchmen after, the Oxford Movement. Dr. Pusey, after several interviews with him at Brighton in 1842-43, wrote to him: "One had become so much the object of suspicion, that I cannot say how cheering it was to be recognised by you as carrying on the same torch which we had received from yourself and from those of your generation who had remained faithful to the old teaching." But Watson did not sympathise entirely with the Oxford movement; there were many points on which he entirely disagreed. He gratefully recognised, however, its good effects, and never lost his confidence in its future. John Keble's Christian Year was one of his favourite books, and he was an admirer and constant reader of Newman's sermons.

He was too diffident to write anything on his own account; his only publication of note was an edition of Hele's Sacred Offices (a book of devotions which he always used himself) in 1825. This had a large circulation on its first appearance, and a still larger on its republication in 1842. There is an excellent miniature of Watson by Sir William Charles Ross.
