= South Hackney =

Area of East London, England

Coordinates: 51°32′30″N 00°02′56″W

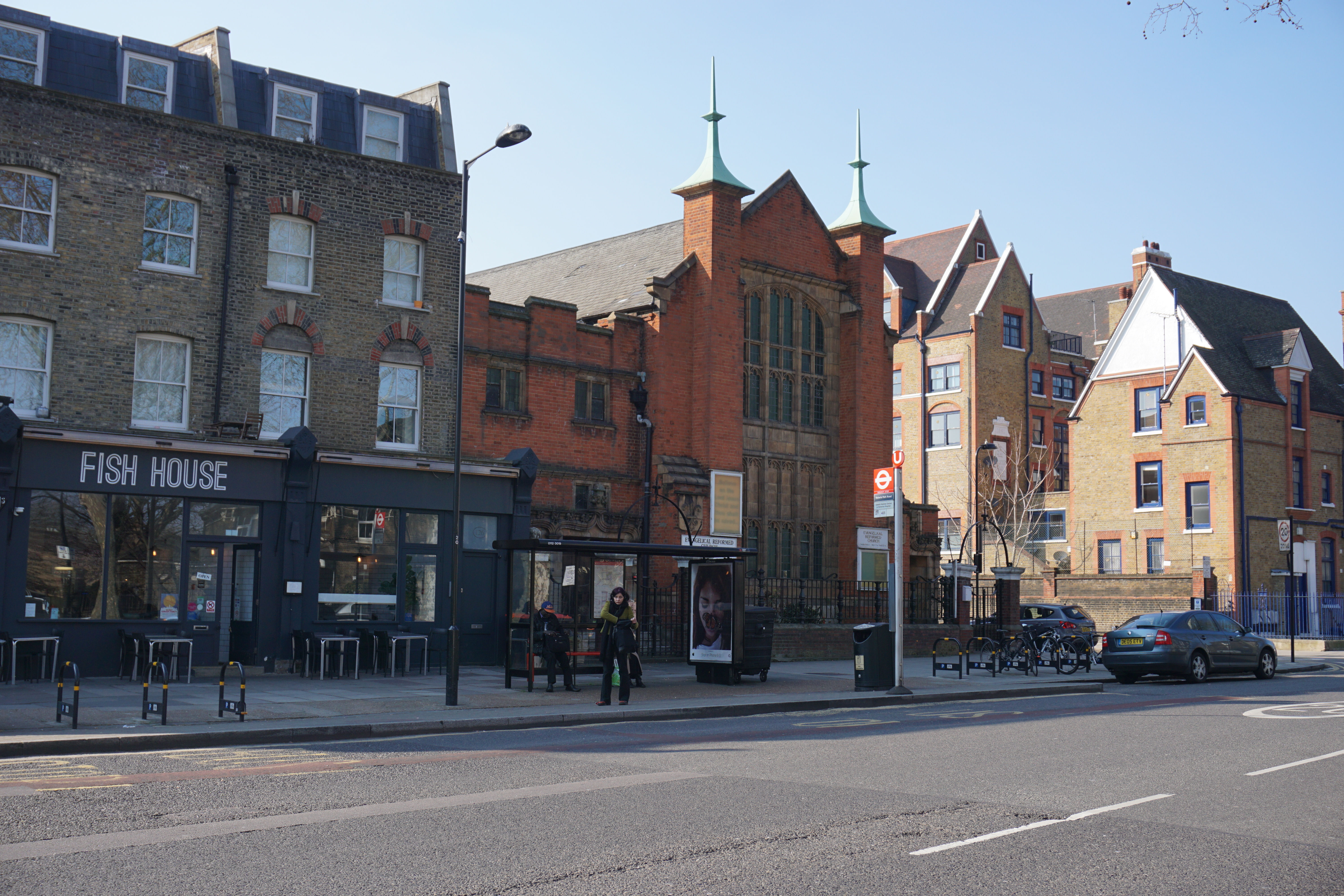
- The Evangelical Reformed Church on Lauriston Road.

- Location within Greater London
- Population: 13,231 (2011 Census)
- OS grid reference: TQ352840
  - Charing Cross: 4.2 mi (6.8 km) SW
- London borough: Hackney
- Ceremonial county: Greater London
- Region: London
- Country: England
- Sovereign state: United Kingdom
- Post town: LONDON
- Postcode district: E9
- Dialling code: 020
- Police: Metropolitan
- Fire: London
- Ambulance: London
- UK Parliament: Hackney South and Shoreditch
- London Assembly: North East

South Hackney is an area in London, England and is located in the London Borough of Hackney. It is in East London and is about 4.2 mi (6.8 km) northeast of Charing Cross.

The Mossbourne Victoria Park Academy on the corner of Victoria Park Road and Lammas Walk utilises the buildings of the former French Hospital (La Providence), a home for elderly Huguenots. The French Hospital was built in the 1860s in the style of a French-Flemish chateau, designed by Robert Lewis Roumieu.

The area just south of Well Street features social housing such as the Kingshold and Shore Estates. The former New Kingshold Estate (built 1966, demolished 1996) was subject of a 1990 Channel 4 documentary Summer On The Estate highlighting some of the problems on the estate with crime and disrepair, and residents' fight to improve it. A follow-up series aired in 1995 as the two tower blocks on the estate, Thornhill Point and Halston Point were demolished in July 1995.

== History ==
In Tudor times, South Hackney consisted of two small settlements. One around the modern Grove and Lauriston Roads; the other where Grove Street and Well Street meet. There were two moated houses, the one on the north side of Well Street belonging to the Knights of the Hospital of St John of Jerusalem, the Knights Hospitaller, in 1416. The house survived into the 18th century, but by then it was in decline and the tenants included chimney sweeps. This was commemorated by the name of the Two Black Boys public house. which stood on the site now occupied by Bernie Grant House in Well Street.

In Church Crescent, near the church are six almshouses, created by a bequest from William Monger in 1669, and funded by land on Hackney Marshes. This land subsequently came into the control of Sir John Cass. The almshouses were rebuilt in 1849, with funds from Sir John Cass's Foundation. A second almshouse was founded in 1857 in memory of South Hackney's first rector, Henry Handley Norris (1771–1850). Norris was a leading member of the Hackney Phalanx, a group of early nineteenth-century Anglican High Churchmen. His portrait hangs in the parish church.

South Hackney originally had a chapel of ease in Well Street, but became an independent parish in 1825, with the parish church of St John of Jerusalem erected in 1848 near Well Street Common. South Hackney was the home of the Eton Manor Boys' Club.

== Demographics ==
Demographic data is produced by the Office for National Statistics for the Victoria ward. In the 2011 census, the population for the Victoria ward was 13,231, with 6344 males and 6887 females. The most common ethnic group was White British in the Victoria ward, measured as 55.8%, followed by Black or Black British (24.1%) and Asian or British Asian (9.5%). The remaining percentage was made up of mixed-race and other unspecified ethnic groups.

== Transport ==
Whilst there are no London Overground stations within the district, it is surrounded by stations in neighbouring districts - London Fields station lies to the West, Homerton station to the North, and Hackney Wick station to the East of Victoria Park. The nearest London Underground station is Bethnal Green to the South.

South Hackney has good bus connections, having six daytime routes and two nighttime routes. Daytime routes in South Hackney includes routes 26, 30, 277, 388, 425, 488 and nighttime routes include routes N26 and N277.
