= Hackney Phalanx =

Group of English politicians, early C19

Hackney Phalanx was a group of high-church Tory defenders of Anglican orthodoxy prominent for around 25 years from c. 1805. They consisted of both clergy and laymen, and filled many of the higher posts of the Church of England of the time. The Phalanx, also called the Clapton sect by analogy with the evangelicals of the Clapham sect, were active reformers within their common theological beliefs, and controlled the British Critic. One of the Phalanx leaders, Henry Handley Norris, was particularly influential in the church appointments made by the Earl of Liverpool. A. B. Webster characterized the group as:

a body of friends (and to some extent of relations) sharing a common theological and political outlook, forming a compact group with an agreed attitude to most of the religious and political measures of the day. We might have described it as a "pressure group" if this did not exaggerate the self-consciousness of the Phalanx. They remained to the end a body of friends, rather than an ecclesiastical or a religious party.

== The Hackney core ==
The core group of the Hackney Phalanx, which suggested the geographical association with Hackney borough then east of the London conurbation, consisted of Henry Handley Norris, the layman Joshua Watson, and his clerical brother John Watson. They were active in the field of education, aiming to counter the schools set up on the scheme of Joseph Lancaster. Joshua Watson and Norris purchased the British Critic in 1811. They also influenced the founding in 1818 of the Christian Remembrancer, another high-church journal. Norris took on Robert Aspland and William Dealtry in the early controversy over the British and Foreign Bible Society, and projected a separate Bible society for Hackney.

The context of Hackney in the first two decades of the 19th century was of an area that as a suburb of London had wealthy families, but also an active nonconformist intellectual and religious life, particularly Unitarians. The Hackney New College and Homerton College contested the ground with the orthodox Anglicans. The Phalanx, among their other activities, built new Anglican churches. Theologically they looked backwards to William Jones of Nayland.

== Associations ==
The associates of the Phalanx were a much broader group. They included a generation of chaplains to Charles Manners-Sutton, who was a significant patron: Christopher Wordsworth, George D'Oyly, and John Lonsdale, with the high churchmen George Cambridge, Charles Lloyd, and Richard Mant. Francis Warre-Cornish names as sympathisers John Bowles, churchmen in addition to Cambridge and Wordsworth, and the judges John Taylor Coleridge, John Patteson, John Richardson, and Nicholas Conyngham Tindal.

There was a significant overlap with the early membership of the Club of Nobody's Friends, a dining club founded in 1801 by William Stevens.

== See also ==
- George Bull
- Ralph Churton
- William Van Mildert
