= John Watson (priest, died 1839) =

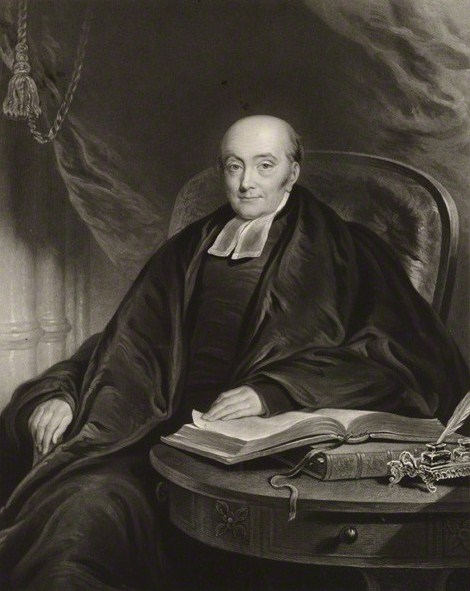
John James Watson, 1834 engraving by Charles Turner, after Edmund Thomas Parris

John James Watson (1767–1839) was an English clergyman who became prominent in the High Church group known now as the Hackney Phalanx. He became Archdeacon of St Albans in 1816.

== Life ==
Watson, brother of Joshua Watson, was curate to Jonathan Boucher, a friend of his father, at Epsom. From 1799 he was vicar, and then rector, of Hackney, at that time east of London proper. Appointed Archdeacon of St Albans in 1816, he held onto the rectorship of Hackney. Henry Handley Norris was Watson's curate, and brother-in-law, and held a post at South Hackney from 1809. The Watson brothers and Norris became the core members of the "Hackney Phalanx", with shared orthodox Anglican beliefs and family ties.

Others who acted as curates to Watson were George Townsend and Edward Churton. Churton married Watson's eldest daughter, Caroline.

== Family ==
Watson married Caroline Powell, sister of the elder Baden Powell (13 Dec 1725 - 31 Jan 1810), the merchant; Powell's daughter Henrietta married Henry Handley Norris. Powell's other sister Susanna (24 Nov 1765 - 20 Jan 1846) married Thomas Sikes ( - 14 Dec 1834), vicar of Guilsborough, and Watson's friend from the University of Oxford. Joshua Watson married Mary Sikes, sister of Thomas Sikes. The younger Baden Powell (22 Aug 1796 - 11 Jun 1860) was therefore nephew to John James Watson.
