= List of people who have converted to Anglicanism =

The following is a list of notable individuals who converted to Anglicanism from a different religion or no religion in recent times.

== Formerly Irreligious ==
- Phillip Blond, English political philosopher
- Matthew Crawford, American philosopher, mechanic and author
- Karl Dallas, British journalist, folk musician, peace activist
- Tamsin Greig, British actress
- Nicky Gumbel, priest, developer of Alpha course
- Geri Halliwell, Ginger Spice, singer, songwriter, and actress
- Peter Hitchens, columnist, commentator, and journalist; brother of the anti-theist writer Christopher Hitchens
- C. E. M. Joad, English philosopher
- Alister McGrath, biochemist, historian, scientist, Christian apologist
- C. S. Lewis, Oxford professor, writer, Christian apologist
- Michael Reiss, British bioethicist, educator, journalist, and priest
- Fay Weldon, British novelist and playwright

== Formerly Buddhist ==
- Ivan Lee, Australian bishop
- Kanishka Raffel, Anglican Archbishop of Sydney

== Formerly Catholic ==
- Madeleine Albright, U.S. Secretary of State
- Pete Buttigieg, American politician, U.S. Secretary of Transportation
- Miriam Byrne, Scottish priest, former Roman Catholic nun
- James Francis Byrnes, American politician, U.S. Secretary of State, governor of South Carolina
- Alice Callaghan, priest, former Roman Catholic nun
- Robert Corrigan, Irish-Canadian settler and farmer
- Alberto Cutié, television and radio host, priest
- Tim Dlugos, American poet
- Dermot Dunne, Dean of Christ Church, Dublin
- Matthew Fox, scholar, priest, former Dominican friar
- Bernard Kenny, American politician, president of the New Jersey Senate
- Joanna Manning, priest, author, feminist, former Roman Catholic nun
- Jim McGreevey, Governor of New Jersey
- Emmanuel Amand de Mendieta, Belgian Benedictine scholar, Anglican priest, former Catholic priest and monk
- Thomas Nast, political cartoonist
- Autumn Phillips, former wife of Peter Phillips
- Katharine Jefferts Schori, first woman primate in the Anglican Communion

== Formerly Hindu ==
- Santosh Marray, Bishop of the Episcopal Diocese of Easton
- Pandita Ramabai, Indian social reformer, scholar
- Gabriel Sharma, Bishop of Viti Levu West, Fiji

== Formerly Jewish ==
- Robert Adley, British politician
- Michael Solomon Alexander, first Anglican Bishop of Jerusalem
- Joy Davidman, wife of C. S. Lewis; poet
- Alfred Edersheim, Biblical scholar, author
- Giles Fraser, priest
- Hugh Montefiore, Bishop of Birmingham
- Ernest Oppenheimer, mining entrepreneur, financier and philanthropist
- Gillian Rose, British philosopher
- Samuel Isaac Joseph Schereschewsky, Bishop of Shanghai, founder of Saint John's University, Shanghai, Bible translator
- Mordechai Vanunu, Israeli former nuclear technician, nuclear whistleblower, peace activist
- Lauren Winner, historian, scholar of religion, priest

== Formerly Mormon ==
- Carrie Sheffield, American columnist, broadcaster and policy analyst

== Formerly Muslim ==
- Parveen Babi, Indian actress, model
- Barkatullah, Archdeacon and Christian apologist
- Hassan Dehqani-Tafti, Bishop of the Diocese of Iran
- Dean Mahomed, Indian traveler, writer, surgeon, and entrepreneur
- Abdul Masih, Indian indigenous missionary, writer, and minister

== Formerly Orthodox ==
- Prince Philip, Duke of Edinburgh, husband of Queen Elizabeth II

== Formerly another branch of Protestantism ==
- T. S. Eliot, American-born British poet, playwright, and critic, formerly a Unitarian
- Enmegahbowh, Native American priest and missionary
- Queen Emma of Hawaii, queen of Hawaii
- Austin Farrer, philosopher, theologian, and biblical scholar, formerly a Baptist
- Emily Ford, artist, feminist, former a Quaker
- Kim Jackson, priest, American politician, first openly LGBTQ+ state senator from Georgia, formerly a Baptist
- Don Edward Johnson, Bishop of the Diocese of West Tennessee, formerly a Baptist
- King Kamehameha IV, king of Hawaii
- Queen Liliʻuokalani, last sovereign monarch of the Hawaiian Kingdom
- Meghan Markle, Duchess of Sussex, American actress, and humanitarian
- John Newton, priest, slavery abolitionist, hymnwriter, author of Amazing Grace
- Rupert Sheldrake, English biochemist, author, formerly a Methodist
- Margaret Thatcher, UK prime minister, formerly a Methodist
- Morris King Thompson, Bishop of the Diocese of Louisiana, formerly a Baptist and Presbyterian

== Formerly other religions ==
- Samuel Ajayi Crowther, linguist, clergyman, and first African Anglican bishop in West Africa
- Thomas Davis, Mohawk war chief
- King Kyebambe III, king of Toro
- Magema Magwaza Fuze, author of the first book in the Zulu language published by a native speaker
- Manteo, Croatan tribe member, first Native American to convert to Anglicanism
- Spokane Garry, Middle Spokane tribal leader
