= Sabelo Stanley Ntwasa =

Sabelo Stanley Ntwasa was a priest in the South African Anglican Church. He is remembered especially for his friendship with Black Consciousness Movement founder Steve Biko and his importance in that movement. He was a powerful speaker and very outspoken politically, often spending time in prison for his criticism of the apartheid regime. He was also one of the early preachers of Black theology, a movement related to Liberation theology and Négritude, which pushed individuals to stand up for themselves and to take pride in their personal worth. This emphasis was in stark contrast to the pacifist emphasis of many South African clergymen on Jesus's teachings that Christians should "turn the other cheek". Ntwasa wrote that the emphasis on God as all powerful was a tool of the oppressor, and thus used the imagery of "God as Love" and "God as Freedom".
