= George Horne (bishop) =

English academic, churchman and writer (1730–1792)

The Right Reverend George Horne
- Bishop of Norwich
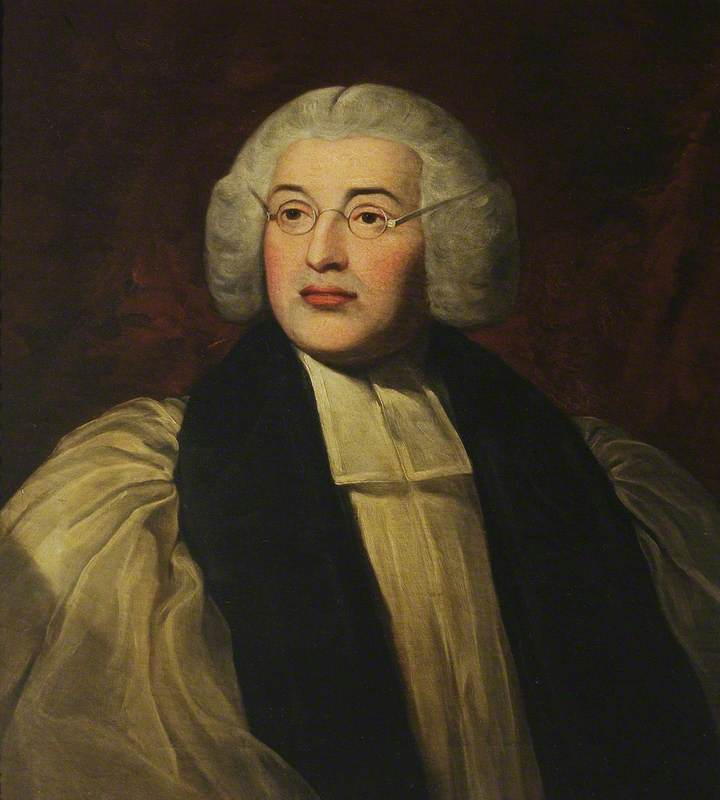
- Diocese: Diocese of Norwich
- In office: 1790–1792
- Predecessor: Lewis Bagot
- Successor: Charles Manners-Sutton
- Other post: Dean of Canterbury (1781–1790)

Personal details
- Born: 1 November 1730 Otham, Kent
- Died: 17 January 1792 (aged 61) Bath, Somerset
- Buried: Eltham Church
- Denomination: Anglican
- Education: University College, Oxford

George Horne (1 November 1730 – 17 January 1792) was an English churchman, academic, writer, and university administrator.

== Early years ==
Horne was born at Otham near Maidstone, in Kent, the eldest surviving son of the Reverend Samuel Horne, rector of the parish, and his wife Anne, youngest daughter of Bowyer Hendley. He attended Maidstone Grammar School alongside his cousin and lifelong friend William Stevens, son of his father's sister Margaret, and from there went in 1746 to University College, Oxford (BA 1749; MA 1752; DD 1764). Three contemporaries at the college were also friends for life: Charles Jenkinson later first Earl of Liverpool, William Jones of Nayland. and John Moore, later Archbishop of Canterbury. His two younger brothers were also Oxford graduates and clergymen, Samuel Horne becoming an Oxford academic while William Horne succeeded their father as rector of Otham.

== Academic career ==
In 1749 Horne became a Fellow of Magdalen College, Oxford, of which college he was elected President on 27 January 1768. As an influential college head, he served as vice-chancellor of the University of Oxford from 1776 until 1780. At the university, he fought against any relaxation of the law that required entrants to subscribe to the beliefs of the Church of England.

== Ecclesiastical career ==
Ordained priest in 1753, from 1760 to 1764 he was curate of the Oxfordshire village of Horspath. Thereafter his religious duties were performed at Magdalen until 1771, when the prime minister Lord North appointed him to the Royal Household as chaplain in ordinary to King George III, a position he held until 1781. In that year, he was appointed Dean of Canterbury, combining the post with the presidency of Magdalen. An energetic dean, he promoted Sunday schools to inform the young and delivered influential sermons against Unitarianism. He was also an active supporter of the Naval and Military Bible Society, now the Naval Military & Air Force Bible Society, founded in 1779 to supply Christian literature to the armed services and seafarers.

In 1790, by then in ill health from which he never recovered, with some reluctance he accepted the bishopric of Norwich, resigning from Canterbury and, the next year, from Magdalen. Unable to accomplish much in his diocese or in the House of Lords, one achievement was to support the bishops of the Episcopalian Church of Scotland who in 1789 came to London to petition Parliament for relief from their legal disadvantages. In what became his final circular to his diocesan clergy, as the French Revolution challenged most of the values for which he stood, he remained adamant that 'true religion and true learning were never yet at variance'.

== Intellectual influences ==
Through his preaching, journalism, correspondence and authorship of numerous works (some at the time anonymous), Horne actively defended the high church tendency in Anglicanism against Calvinism, the Church of England against other denominations, and Trinitarian Christianity against other beliefs. He had a reputation as a preacher, and his sermons were frequently reprinted. In his polemical pieces, some appearing in newspapers under the name of Nathaniel Freebody (a cousin who had died), he was influenced by the work of Charles Leslie Having early adopted some of the views of John Hutchinson, he wrote in his defence, though disagreeing with Hutchinson's fanciful interpretations of Hebrew etymology. He also fell under the imputation of Methodism, but protested from the university pulpit against those who took their theology from George Whitefield and John Wesley rather than major Anglican divines. Nevertheless, he disapproved of the expulsion of six Methodist students from St Edmund Hall, Oxford, a high-profile event of 1768 in Oxford; and later, when bishop, thought Wesley should not be forbidden to preach in his diocese.

Though impressed by the earlier writings of William Law, he later complained that he saw him 'falling from the heaven of Christianity into the sink and complication of Paganism, Quakerism, and Socinianism, mixed up with chemistry and astrology by a possessed cobbler.' In this 'sink', he included the views of Emanuel Swedenborg and Jacob Boehme. Despite criticising the plan of Benjamin Kennicott and some of his colleagues to collate a new text of the Hebrew Bible from manuscripts, in order to prepare for a new translation into English, the two became friends. He was also friendly with Samuel Johnson who with James Boswell came to tea at Magdalen, where they discussed producing a new edition of the Lives by Izaak Walton, and Boswell later wrote warmly of Horne's character and abilities. Though he enjoyed reading Edward Gibbon and admired his scholarship, he recorded his distaste for Gibbon's continual belittling of the Jewish and Christian tradition.

His lifelong emphasis on revealed religion rather than natural religion and his acceptance of what would become high church beliefs formed an important link between the nonjurors of the seventeenth century and the Oxford Movement of the nineteenth.

== Writings ==
Among his publications were:

- The Theology and Philosophy of Cicero's Somnium Scipionis 1751, a satirical pamphlet.
- (With William Jones) A full answer to the Essay on Spirit by Bishop R. Clayton, with a particular explanation of the Hermetic, Pythagorean, and Platonic Trinities, 1752. Against the views of Robert Clayton.
- A Fair, Candid, and Impartial Statement of the Case between Sir Isaac Newton and Mr. Hutchinson (anon.) 1753.
- An Apology for certain Gentlemen in the University of Oxford, aspersed in a late anonymous pamphlet 1756. The anonymous pamphlet was called 'A Word to the Hutchinsonians'.
- Cautions to the Readers of Mr. Law, and, with very few varieties, to the Readers of Baron Swedenborg 1758, to which was added A Letter to a Lady on the subject of Jacob Behmen's Writings.
- A View of Mr. Kennicott's Method of Correcting the Hebrew Text 1760.
- Considerations on the Life and Death of St. John the Baptist 1769, an expansion of a sermon preached by him on St. John the Baptist's day 1755, from the open-air pulpit in the quadrangle of Magdalen College.
- Commentary on the Psalms, 1771. His best known work, the 'Commentary' is partly exegetical and partly devotional, proceeding on the principle that most of the Psalms are more or less Messianic, and cannot be properly understood except in those terms. Richard Mant transferred Horne's preface almost verbatim to his annotated Book of Common Prayer. Hannah More, another of Horne's friends, admired it.
- A Letter to Dr. Adam Smith (anon), 1777. An attack on Adam Smith's life of David Hume, attempting to refute Hume's contempt for Christian belief.
- Letters on Infidelity 1784, addressed to his cousin William Stevens. In addition to his bête noire David Hume, these attacked other Enlightenment rationalists such as Voltaire and d'Alembert.
- A Key to the Book of Psalms (1785)

He intended writing a ‘'Defence of the Divinity of Christ'’ against Joseph Priestley, but did not live to do that. Horne's collected Works were published with a Memoir by William Jones in 1799.

== Family ==
On 22 June 1768, he married Felicia Elizabetha (1741–1821), only child of lawyer and legal author Philip Burton and his wife Felicia, daughter of Ralph Whitfield. They had three daughters: Felicia Elizabetha (1770–1829) who in 1791 married the Reverend Robert Selby Hele; Maria (1773–1852) unmarried; and Sarah (1775–1853), a pupil of Hannah More, who in 1796 married the Reverend Humphrey Aram Hole.

Aged 62, he died at Bath, Somerset on 17 January 1792 and was interred in his father-in-law's vault at Eltham.

== Sources ==
- This article incorporates text from a publication now in the public domain: "Horne, George". Dictionary of National Biography. London: Smith, Elder & Co. 1885–1900.

Academic offices
Preceded by Thomas Jenner	President of Magdalen College, Oxford; 1768–1791	Succeeded by Martin Joseph Routh
Preceded by Thomas Fothergill	Vice-Chancellor of Oxford University; 1776–1780	Succeeded by Samuel Dennis
Church of England titles
Preceded by James Cornwallis	Dean of Canterbury; 1781–1790	Succeeded by William Buller
Preceded by Lewis Bagot	Bishop of Norwich; 1790–1792	Succeeded by Charles Manners-Sutton
