= Pamphleteer =

Person who writes or distributes pamphlets

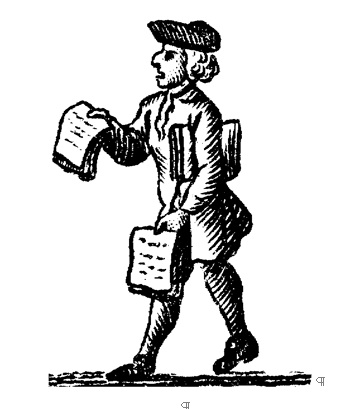
Pamphleteer

A pamphleteer is a historical term used to describe someone who creates or distributes pamphlets, unbound (therefore inexpensive) booklets intended for wide circulation.

== Context ==
Pamphlets were used to broadcast the writer's opinions: to articulate a political ideology, for example, or to encourage people to vote for a particular politician. Early modern news pamphlets also made extensive use of stock imagery to describe, highlight, or criticize various social and cultural events and issues. During times of political unrest, such as the French Revolution, pamphleteers were highly active in attempting to shape public opinion. Before the advent of telecommunications, those with access to a printing press and a supply of paper often used pamphlets to widely disseminate their ideas.

== Famous pamphleteers ==
Thomas Paine's pamphlets were influential in the history of the American Revolutionary War. 17th-century Dutch naval officer Witte de With wrote papers mocking and praising his fellow officers. Poet and polemicist John Milton published pamphlets as well. Jonathan Edwards and John Calvin changed the course of Christianity with their pamphlets.

== See also ==
- Broadside
- Ephemera
- Manuscript
- Tract
