= Nobody's Friends =

Dining club in England

The Club of Nobody's Friends
- Formation: 1800
- Founder: William Stevens
- Purpose: social dining
- Location: Lambeth Palace
- Affiliations: Church of England

The Club of Nobody's Friends is a private dining club with origins in the High Church tradition of the Church of England. It is one of the oldest of the London dining clubs and frequently meets in Lambeth Palace. Its motto is Pro Ecclesia et Rege.

== History ==
1891 menu

The club, often referred to simply as Nobody's Friends or Nobody's, was founded in honour of William Stevens and first met on 21 June 1800 at the Crown and Anchor Tavern in the Strand. Its inaugural dinner consisted of thirteen men who would later form the movement known as the Hackney Phalanx. In the late 1880s Nobody’s occasionally met at the Freemasons' Tavern, which served as a meeting place for a variety of notable organisations from the eighteenth century until it was demolished to make way for the Connaught Hotel in 1909.

Stevens was a wealthy hosier who became a writer and philanthropist, leading figure in the High Church movement, and Treasurer of Queen Anne's Bounty. He wrote theological pamphlets under the pen name of Nobody which gave the club its curious name.

The club grew to consist of 50 members, half clergymen and half laymen, and met three times a year. Between 1800 and 1900 membership included three archbishops, forty-nine bishops, twenty Cathedral deans, many peers and baronets, and members of the House of Commons. It also included privy councillors, judges, and fellows of both the Royal Society and the Society of Antiquaries.

A Nobody's menu from 1891 shows a club dinner at the Hotel Metropole, London consisting of ten or more courses, standard at that time in formal Victorian dining. It may be assumed that presentation of the courses was in the service à la russe tradition.

== Recent times ==
It is recorded that in 1962 a former bishop of Norwich, Launcelot Fleming, left Nobody's the "worse for wear" and was later found by friends singing "I’m a space Bishop" whilst wearing a motorbike helmet he had acquired on the journey home. The story may be apocryphal, but it is said that he met his future wife among the friends who discovered him in this state.

Writing in his diaries The Old Boys' Network, John Rae the celebrated headmaster of Westminster School said of a 1984 dinner:

The dinner is good and I enjoy the company of the Archbishop of Canterbury sitting beside me, but I can’t think why I joined except that Edward Carpenter and Burke Trend are both members. After dinner, we discuss the admission of women to membership and some very odd backwoodsman’s views are expressed, notably by three former headmasters – Frank Fisher, Tom Howarth and Oliver van Oss. The latter is particularly pompous, reducing the discussion to farce, an old trick that headmasters use when faced with pupils or masters demanding change. I say a few words in favour of admitting women but it is decided that there will be a postal vote and I guess the backwoodsmen will carry the day. In the obscurity of the closet, the bishops and deans will vote for the cosy status quo.

Women were first admitted in 2004, including Sheila Cameron KC.

In 2005, Conservative peer Lord Brooke speaking in the House of Lords on the death of Lord Belstead said

He was a member of "Nobody's Friends"—a body which dines in Lambeth Palace, half of whom are lay people and half of whom are ecclesiastical. I will not explain why what I am about to say happens, but the group is called "Nobody's Friends" because people who are elected to it have to make a seven-minute speech to explain why they are nobody's friend. It will not surprise your Lordships' House that John Belstead did that particularly well.

In 2014, the retired bishop of Bath and Wells, Rt Revd John Bickersteth, when asked how he had become a bishop described how after being 'spotted' at Nobody's, "You used to have lunch at the Athenaeum." Though he recalled that in his case, the luncheon leading to episcopal elevation took place at The Commonwealth Club.

The current President of Nobody's is believed to be Sir Philip Mawer, former Secretary General of the Church of England's Synod and current chair of Allchurches Trust. He was President in 2015. It is not known whether he has been replaced.

== Independent Inquiry into Child Sexual Abuse (IICSA) ==
In 2018 the club was subject of a question in the IICSA hearing into abuse in the Church of England. Lord Lloyd had sent a letter of influence in the Peter Ball case to Archbishop Carey prefaced with the phrase "May I presume on a brief acquaintanceship at dinners of Nobody's Friends?" When asked about the club in his evidence to the Inquiry, Lord Lloyd described Nobody's Friends as "simply a club, half consisting of the clergy, members of the clergy, and half consisting of members of the laity, which dine together probably twice a year, very often in Lambeth Palace." The IICSA counsel pointed out that the Daily Mail had once described it as "centred on a strong core of bishops, ex-Tory ministers and former military top brass, a highly secretive, all-male group representing Britain's most entrenched professions and institutions." Lord Lloyd replied, "That's a typical Daily Mail description of something they don't particularly like, but I can assure you that Nobody's Friends is a perfectly ordinary dining club..." The same article that IICSA drew upon in the hearing indicated that Prime Minister Tony Blair had been keen to join the club in 2003.

Stephen Parsons commented in an influential blog, following the IICSA hearing, that the forum Nobody’s Friends provided for influence in the Peter Ball case suggested a “toxic masculinity” in the Church of England. He went on to say:

A men-only dining club that meets regularly at Lambeth Palace, known as Nobody’s Friends, appears to be a gathering for socially very well-connected Anglicans. Although originally high church in its origins, the club provides an opportunity for a privileged church group to network and sometimes lobby those in authority in the Church …… The Nobody’s Friends dining group has been described as ‘private’ rather than a secret group, but it still represents an exclusive world of male privilege within the heart of the Anglican establishment. When Bishop John Bickersteth once revealed that his appointment to Bath and Wells followed his being ‘spotted’ at a Nobody’s dinner, we began to get the feeling that the values of our church may incline towards corporate and institutional interests rather than a personal morality based on the Sermon on the Mount.

== Bibliography ==
- A sketch of the characters of Sir John Patteson and Sir John Coleridge, Written at the Request of "Nobody's Friends" (1877)
- Biographical List of the Members of "The Club of Nobody's Friends" since Its Foundation 21 June 1800 to 30 September 1885 (London: Privately Printed, 1885).
- The Club of "Nobody's Friends," Since Its Foundation on 21 June 1800 to 29 April 1902 Volume II. (London: Printed for Private Circulation, 1902)
- Geoffrey Rowell, The Club of 'Nobody's Friends' 1800-2000: A Memoir on Its Two-hundredth Anniversary (Edinburgh: Pentland Press, 2000) ISBN 9781858217789

== See also ==
- Nikæan Club
- Gentlemen's Clubs in London
