= Henry Handley Norris =

English clergyman and theologian

Henry Handley Norris (1771–1850) was an English clergyman and theologian. He was the clerical leader of the High Church grouping later known as the Hackney Phalanx, that grew up around him and his friend Joshua Watson.

== Life ==
The son of Henry Handley Norris of Hackney, by Grace, daughter of the Rev. T. Hest of Warton, Lancashire, he was born at Hackney on 14 January 1771. Educated at Newcome's School and Peterhouse, Cambridge, where he graduated B.A. 1797, M.A. 1806, he was admitted ad eundem at the University of Oxford on 23 January 1817.

Norris became a curate of Hackney parish church, the Church of St John-at-Hackney. He contributed to the cost of building a chapel-of-ease in South Hackney, not far from his family mansion. In 1809, on becoming the perpetual curate of the chapel, he made over to trustees a fee-farm rent of £21 a year as an endowment; he also erected at his own expense a minister's residence in Well Street. In 1831 the perpetual curacy became a rectory, and in this incumbency Norris remained till his death. Norris became dissatisfied with the chapel-of-ease and in the 1840s succeeded in building the huge St John of Jerusalem church, the current parish church of South Hackney.

The influence held by Norris in the religious world was far-reaching. He came to be known as the head of the high church party, leading a group of like-minded friends based in Hackney, the Hackney Phalanx, which was regarded as the rival and counterpoise of the evangelical school or Clapham sect. It was rumoured, baselessly that during Lord Liverpool's long premiership every see that fell vacant was offered to Norris, with the request that if he would not take it himself, he would recommend someone else; so he had the nickname "the Bishop-maker". From 1793 to 1834, as a member of the committee of the Society for Promoting Christian Knowledge, he largely ruled its proceedings; but in 1834 there was a revolt against his management, and he was left in a minority.

Norris became a prebendary of Llandaff Cathedral on 22 November 1816, and a prebendary of St Paul's Cathedral on 4 November 1825. Inheriting from his father an ample fortune, he was able to aid many students in their university and professional careers. Norris died at Grove Street, Hackney, on 4 December 1850. Parishioners, assisted by his family, erected in his memory an almshouse for four Anglican widows.

== Works ==
Norris's best known work is A Practical Exposition of the Tendency and Proceedings of the British and Foreign Bible Society, in a Correspondence between the Rev. H. H. Norris and J. W. Freshfield, Esq., 1813; with an Appendix, 1814; 2nd edit. 1814. This correspondence arose from an attempt made by James William Freshfield (1801–1857) to form an Auxiliary Bible Society in Hackney, to which Norris strongly objected. A pamphlet war arose, and among the controversialists were Robert Aspland (1813) and William Dealtry (1815).

His other writings were:

- A Respectful Letter to the Earl of Liverpool, occasioned by the Speech imputed to his Lordship at the Isle of Thanet Bible Society Meeting, 1822.
- A Vindication of a Respectful Letter to the Earl of Liverpool, 1823. These two works also gave rise to rejoinders by Schofield in 1822 and Paterson in 1823.
- The Origin, Progress, and Existing Circumstances of the London Society for Promoting Christianity among the Jews, 1825.
- The Principles of the Jesuits developed in a Collection of Extracts from their own Authors, 1839.
- A Pastor's Legacy: or Instructions for Confirmation, 1851.

== Family ==
On 19 June 1805 Norris married Catherine Henrietta (17 Sep 1773 – 26 June 1854), daughter of David Powell (17 Sep 1773 – 26 June 1854) and Laetitia Clark (25 Dec 1741 – 27 April 1801). They had a son, Henry, born on 28 February 1810, formerly of Swancliffe Park, Oxfordshire.
