= William Stevens (writer) =

English hosier and lay writer

- Born: March 2, 1732; St. Saviour's, Southwark
- Died: February 7, 1807 (aged 74)

William Stevens (2 March 1732 – 7 February 1807) was an English hosier and lay writer on religious topics from a High Church perspective, the biographer and editor of the works of William Jones of Nayland.

== Life ==
Born in the parish of St. Saviour's, Southwark, he was son of a tradesman. His mother was sister of the Rev. Samuel Horne of Otham, Kent. He was educated at Maidstone with his cousin, George Horne, later bishop of Norwich. In August 1746 he was apprenticed to a hosier in Old Broad Street named Hookham, whose partner he afterwards became; Hookham's daughter married John Frere, and was mother of John Hookham Frere. After Hookham's death Stevens became the senior partner, but in 1801 he gave up most of his interest in the business, and a few years later retired altogether.

Stevens identified himself with the clergy who acknowledged William Jones of Nayland as their leader. He joined with Jones and others in forming a ‘Society for the Reformation of Principles,’ to counteract the influence of the French Revolution. The society published a collection of tracts for the younger clergy, and originated the British Critic, a quarterly journal.

Stevens acted for many years as treasurer of Queen Anne's Bounty, supported the work of the church societies, and interested himself in the position of the episcopal church in Scotland. Stevens died at his house in Old Broad Street, and was buried in Otham churchyard. He left the bulk of his property to his cousin, William Horne, the rector of Otham.

== Works ==
Stevens acquired a good knowledge of French, Hebrew, and the classics. His main interest was theology. He maintained a correspondence with Bishop George Horne, and suggested the plan which Horne later used in his Letters on Infidelity, which were dedicated to Stevens. On Horne's death, Stevens published three volumes of his sermons, and supplied William Jones of Nayland with materials for Jones' biography of Horne.

In 1772 Stevens wrote A new and faithful Translation of Letters from M. l'Abbé de ——, Hebrew Professor in the University of ——, to the Rev. Benjamin Kennicott. In this anonymous brochure he followed up Horne's attack on Benjamin Kennicott's project of a revised Hebrew text of the Old Testament. The next year he published, in opposition to the recent effort to get rid of subscription to the Thirty-Nine Articles, An Essay on the Nature and Constitution of the Christian Church, wherein are set forth the form of its government, the extent of its powers, and the limits of our obedience, by a Layman. A new edition of Stevens's ‘Essay’ appeared in 1799, and it was reissued by the SPCK in vol. iv. of their ‘Religious Tracts’ in 1800, in 1807, and in 1833.

In 1776 Stevens published A Discourse on the English Revolution, extracted from a late eminent writer, and applied to the present time; and in the following year attacked Richard Watson, in Strictures on a Sermon entitled the Principles of the Revolution vindicated. In 1795 Jones dedicated to Stevens his Life of Bishop Horne. In 1800, in a Review of the Review of a new Preface to the Second Edition of Mr. Jones's Life of Bishop Horne, Stevens defended his cousin from an attack in the British Critic. It was signed "Ain" (Hebrew for "Nobody"), and suggested the title of a collection of Stevens's pamphlets issued in 1805 as Oudenos erga, Nobody's Works. A club was also founded in his honour under the name "Nobody's Friends" about 1800. It met three times a year. Sir Richard Richards was the first president, and it contained well-known clergymen, barristers, and doctors.

Stevens's final publication was his edition of William Jones's works published in 1801 in twelve octavo volumes. Prefixed to it was a life of Jones in the style of Izaak Walton (part of which had already appeared in the Anti-Jacobin Review). Daniel Wray described Stevens as "a tory of the old Filmer stamp".
