= William Jones of Nayland =

18th-century English clergyman and author

William Jones (30 July 1726 – 6 January 1800), known as William Jones of Nayland, was a British clergyman and author.

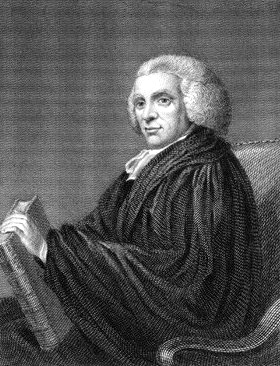
William Jones, engraving by Robert Graves

== Life ==
He was born at Lowick, Northamptonshire, but was descended from an old Welsh family. One of his ancestors was Colonel John Jones, brother-in-law of Oliver Cromwell. He was educated at Charterhouse School and University College, Oxford. There a taste for music, as well as a similarity of character, led to his close intimacy with George Horne, later bishop of Norwich, whom he induced to study Hutchinsonian doctrines.

After obtaining his bachelor's degree at University College, Oxford in 1749, Jones held various preferments (Vicar of Bethersden, Kent (1764); Rector of Pluckley, Kent (1765)). In 1777 he obtained the perpetual curacy of Nayland, Suffolk, and on Horne's appointment to Norwich became his chaplain, afterwards writing his life. His vicarage became the centre of a High Church coterie, and Jones himself was a link between the non-jurors and the Oxford Movement. He could write intelligibly on abstruse topics.

== Works ==
In 1756 Jones published his tract The Catholic Doctrine of a Trinity, a statement of the doctrine from the Hutchinsonian point of view, with a summary of biblical proofs. This was followed in 1762 by an Essay on the First Principles of Natural Philosophy, in which he maintained the theories of Hutchinson in opposition to those of Isaac Newton, and in 1781 he dealt with the same subject in Physiological Disquisitions. Jones was also the originator of the British Critic (May 1793). Eighteenth century high churchmen were more concerned with ecclesiology than with the sacraments. The status of Anglican ministry was crucial to high church ecclesiology. The ground of the Anglican ministry was trinitarian orthodoxy and this doctrine was reasserted by high churchmen against Arians, Deists and Socinians. Jones's "A Full Answer to the Essay on Spirit" (London 1753), co-authored with George Horne, responded to Robert Clayton's Arian work of three years earlier and sharpened the trinitarian controversy according to Jones himself.

In the 1790s he and William Stevens launched the Society for the Reformation of Principles. Jones wrote loyalist tracts and argued that the French Revolution was a manifestation of the Antichrist. His ideas were perpetuated after his death by successive reprints of his works and helped influence the 19th century conservative tradition in both Church and State.

His collected works, with a life by William Stevens, appeared in 1801, in 12 vols., and were condensed into 6 vols in 1810. A life of Jones, forming pt. 5 of the Biography of English Divines, was published in 1849. He published a hymn to the words of John Milton, the seventeenth century puritanical republican, 'The Lord will come and not be slow.'
