= Calverley (surname) =

Calverley is an English toponymic surname associated with the village of Calverley in West Yorkshire, England. Notable people with the surname include:

- Alf Calverley (1917–1991), English footballer
- Amice Calverley (1896–1959), English-born Canadian Egyptologist
- Bruce Calverley (1918–1961), Australian rules footballer
- Charles Stuart Calverley (1831–1884), English poet and wit
- Des Calverley (1919–2016), Australian rules footballer
- Edmund Calverley (1826–1897), English cricketer
- Eleanor Jane Taylor Calverley (1887–1968), American missionary
- Ernie Calverley (1924–2003), American basketball player
- Graham Calverley (born 1943), Australian rules footballer
- Hugh Calverley (disambiguation), multiple people
- John Calverley (died 1576), English Anglican priest
- Ray Calverley (born 1946), Australian rules footballer
- Raymond Calverley (born 1951), British slalom canoeist
- Selwyn Calverley (1855–1900), British sailor
- Walter Calverley (disambiguation), multiple people
- James Calverley (born 1993), Canadian Portfolio Entrepreneur
- Stuart Calverley (born 1995), The Cooler Brother to James Calverley
- Will Calverley (born 1998), Canadian ice hockey player
- William Slater Calverley (1847–1898), English vicar and antiquarian
