= Thomas Sanderson =

Thomas Sanderson may refer to:

- Thomas Sanderson (poet) (1759–1829), English writer based in Cumberland
- Thomas Sanderson (Saskatchewan politician) (1849–1922), Scottish-born farmer and political figure in Saskatchewan
- Thomas Sanderson (Wisconsin politician) (1827–1912), American farmer and politician in Wisconsin
- Thomas Kemp Sanderson (1821–1897), English corn merchant and politician
- Thomas Sanderson, 1st Baron Sanderson (1841–1923), British civil servant
- Thomas Sanderson (priest), English Anglican priest
- T. J. Cobden-Sanderson (Thomas James Cobden-Sanderson, 1840–1922), né Sanderson, English artist and bookbinder
