= Boyle Lectures =

The Boyle Lectures are a series of public lectures named after 17th century Anglo-Irish scientist and philosopher Robert Boyle (1627 – 1691), a prominent natural philosopher of early modern Britain and Ireland.

Under the terms of his will, Robert Boyle, a wealthy inheritor as the son of Richard Boyle, 1st Earl of Cork, supplied £50 GBP (from 1691, the year of Robert's death, roughly equivalent in purchasing power to £10,000 – £13,500 in 2026) per annum to endow a series of lectures or sermons—originally with the intention that eight lectures be given each year—which were to consider the relationship between Christianity and the then-fledgling discipline of natural philosophy. A field of inquiry comparable to, and the precursor of, modern-day science—and of the sciences and scientific inquiry broadly—the development and study of natural philosophy was a key element of the processes leading to the Enlightenment and the Scientific Revolution, and on its own a subject of intense intellectual exploration emergent in 17th-century European society, namely among the learned and scholarly classes of the time; European civilization being predominantly Christian—Europe itself considered a cornerstone of wider Christendom—alongside these academic pursuits appeared Christian apologetics aimed at countering the disputations of theology arising from religious engagement with that subject, with a particular focus placed upon doctrinal and dogmatic claims regarding supernatural phenomena scrutinized in the light of scientific skepticism.

Since 2004, this prestigious Lectures series has been organized, with the assistance of Board of the Boyle Lectures, by the International Society for Science and Religion (ISSR), and has again been held at one of its original locations, the Wren church of St Mary-le-Bow on Cheapside in the City of London.

== History ==
=== Early lectures ===
The first such lecture was given in 1692 by Richard Bentley, to whom Isaac Newton had written:

Sir, When I wrote my Treatise about our System, I had an Eye upon such Principles as might work with considering Men, for the Belief of a Deity; nothing can rejoice me more than to find it useful for that Purpose.

The early lecturers were specifically charged to prove the truth of the Christian religion against Jews, Muslims and non-believers, without considering any controversies or differences that might exist between different Christian groups.

"To preach eight sermons in the year, for proving the Christian religion against notorious infidels, viz. Atheists, Deists, Pagans, Jews, Mahometans, not descending to any controversies that are among Christians themselves."

— Richard Bentley, The Folly and Unreasonableness of Atheism; The Epistle Dedicatory.

A clergyman was to be appointed to the lectureship for a term of no more than three years by Thomas Tenison (later Archbishop of Canterbury) and three other nominated trustees. Boyle had assigned the rent from his house in Crooked Lane to support the lectures but the income from that source soon disappeared. Archbishop Tenison then arranged that the rental income from a farm in the parish of Brill in Buckinghamshire was to be paid at the rate of £12.10.00 per quarter to the lecturer.

=== Revival ===
The Boyle Lectures were revived in 2004 at the famous Wren church of St Mary-le-Bow in the City of London by Dr Michael Byrne, a Fellow of Birkbeck College London. Financial support for the lectures has been provided by a number of patrons, principally the Worshipful Company of Grocers and the Worshipful Company of Mercers in the city. A book to mark the 10th anniversary of the revived series was edited by Russell Re Manning and Michael Byrne and published by SCM Press in 2013 as 'Science and Religion in the Twenty-First Century: The Boyle Lectures 2004-2013'.

Having convened the first 15 lectures in the new series, Michael Byrne stepped down as Convenor in 2018. Management of the lecture then passed to the International Society for Science and Religion (ISSR) in cooperation with the Boyle Lectures Board of Trustees. Members of the board include John Boyle, 15th Earl of Cork; the Hon. Robert Boyle; Julian Tregoning, Past Master of the Grocers' Company; Xenia Dennan, Past Master of the Mercers Company; the Revd George R. Bush, Rector of St Mary-le-Bow; Emeritus Professor John Hedley Brooke; Dr Russell Re Manning; Professor Fraser Watts; and the Revd Michael Reiss, former President of the ISSR.

== Chronological list ==
17th century

- 1692 – A Confutation of Atheism, by Richard Bentley
- 1693-94 - A Demonstration of the Messias, in which the Truth of the Christian Religion is proved, especially against the Jews, by Richard Kidder
- 1694 - [Title Unknown], by Richard Bentley
- 1695 - The Possibility, Expediency and Necessity of Divine Revelation, by John Williams
- 1696 - The Perfection of the Evangelical Revelation, by John Williams
- 1697 - The Certainty of the Christian Revelation and the Necessity of believing it, established, by Francis Gastrell (Bishop of Chester)
- 1698 - The Atheistical Objections against the Being of God and His Attributes fairly considered and fully refuted, by John Harris
- 1699 - The Credibility of the Christian Revelation, from its intrinsick Evidence, by Samuel Bradford (Bishop of Rochester)
- 1700 - The Sufficiency of a Standing Revelation, by Offspring Blackall

18th century

- 1701–02 - Truth and Excellency of the Christian Religion, by George Stanhope
- 1703 - Adams
- 1704 - A Demonstration of the Being and Attributes of God, by Samuel Clarke
- 1705 - The Evidences of Natural and Revealed Religion, by Samuel Clarke
- 1706 - Arguments to Prove the Being of a God, by John Hancock
- 1707 - The Accomplishment of Scripture Prophecies, by William Whiston
- 1708 - The Wisdom of God in the Redemption of Man, as delivered in the Holy Scriptures, vindicated from the chief Objections of Modern Infidels, by John Turner
- 1709 - Religion no Matter of Shame, by Lilly Butler
- 1710 - The Divine Original and Excellence of the Christian Religion, by Josiah Woodward
- 1711–12 - Physico-Theology, or a Demonstration of the Being and Attributes of God from his Works of Creation, by William Derham
- 1713–14 - On the Exercise of Private Judgment, or Free-Thinking, by Benjamin Ibbot
- 1717–18 - Natural Obligations to Believe the Principles of Religion and Divine Revelation, by John Leng
- 1719 - An Enquiry into the Cause and Origin of Evil, by John Clarke
- 1720 - On the Origin of Evil, by John Clarke
- 1721 - The pretended Difficulties in Natural or Revealed Religion, no Excuse for Infidelity, by Robert Gurdon
- 1724–25 - A Demonstration of True Religion, in a Chain of Consequences from certain and undeniable Principles, by Thomas Burnett
- 1725–28 - John Denne
- 1730–32 - The Gradual Revelation of the Gospel from the time of Man's Apostacy, by William Berriman
- 1736–38 - The History of the Acts of the Holy Apostles, confirmed from other Authors, and considered as full Evidence for the Truth of Christianity, by Richard Biscoe
- 1739–41 - Leonard Twells
- 1747–49 - Christianity justified upon the Scripture Foundation; being a Summery View of the Controversy between Christians and Deists, by Henry Stebbing
- 1750–52 - John Jortin
- 1756–58 - Thomas Newton
- 1759–62 - Charles Moss
- 1763 - A Discourse upon the Being of God against Atheists, by Ralph Heathcote
- 1766–68 - The Evidence of Christianity deduced from Facts and the Testimony of Senses throughout all Ages of the Church to the present time, by William Worthington
- 1769–71 - The Intent and Propriety of the Scripture Miracles considered and explained, by Henry Owen
- 1778–80 - An Argument for the Christian Religion, drawn from a Comparison of Revelation with the Natural Operations of the Mind, by James Williamson

19th century

- 1802–05 - An Historical View of the Rise and Progress of Infidelity, with a Refutation of its Principles and Reasonings, by William Van Mildert
- 1812 - William Van Mildert
- 1814 - Frederick Nolan
- 1821 - The Connection of Christianity with Human Happiness, by William Harness
- 1845–46 - The Religions of the World; and Their Relations to Christianity Considered in Eight Lectures - Frederick Denison Maurice
- 1854 - Christopher Wordsworth
- 1857 - Eight discourses on the miracles, by William Gilson Humphry
- 1861 - The Bible and its Critics: an Enquiry into the Objective Reality of Revealed Truths, by Edward Garbett
- 1862 - The Conflict between Science and Infidelity, by Edward Garbett
- 1863 - The Divine Plan of Revelation, by Edward Garbett
- 1864 - The conversion of the Roman empire, by Charles Merivale
- 1865 - The Conversion of the Northern Nations, by Charles Merivale
- 1866–67 - Christ and Christendom, by Edward Hayes Plumptre
- 1868 - The Witness of the Old Testament to Christ, by Stanley Leathes
- 1869 - The Witness of St. Paul to Christ, by Stanley Leathes
- 1870 - The Witness of St. John to Christ, by Stanley Leathes
- 1871–72 - Moral Difficulties Connected with the Bible, by James Augustus Hessey
- 1874–75 - Christianity and Morality Or the Correspondence of the Gospel with the Moral Nature of Man, by Henry Wace
- 1876 - What is Natural Theology?, by Alfred Barry
- 1877–78 - The Manifold Witness for Christ, by Alfred Barry
- 1879–80 - The Evidential Value of the Holy Eucharist, by George Frederick Maclear
- 1884 - The Scientific Obstacles to Christian Belief, by George Herbert Curteis
- 1890 - Old Truths in Modern Lights (The Present Conflict of Science and Theology), by T. G. Bonney
- 1891 - Christian Doctrines and Modern Thought, by T. G. Bonney
- 1893 - Ascent of Faith or the Grounds of Certainty in Science and Religion, by Alexander James Harrison
- 1895 - The Gospel of Experience Or the Witness of Human Life to the Truth of Revelation, by W. C. E. Newbolt
- 1897 - William Benham

20th century

- 1903–05 - The Testimony of St. Paul to Christ Viewed in Some of its Aspects, by Richard John Knowling
- 1935–36 - God, Creation and Revelation, by Allen John MacDonald
- 1965 - The Christian Universe, by Eric Mascall

21st century

- 2004 - Darwin, Design, and the Promise of Nature, by John F. Haught, with a response by Richard Chartres
- 2005 - Darwin's Compass: How Evolution Discovers the Song of Creation, by Simon Conway Morris, with a response by Keith Ward
- 2006 - The Emergence of Spirit: From Complexity to Anthropology to Theology, by Philip Clayton, with a response by Niels Gregersen
- 2007 - Cosmology of Ultimate Concern, by John D Barrow, with a response by Martin Rees
- 2008 - Psychologising and Neurologising about Religion: Facts, Fallacies and the Future, by Malcolm Jeeves, with a response by Fraser Watts
- 2009 - Misusing Darwin: The Materialist Conspiracy in Evolutionary Biology, by Keith Ward, with a response by John Polkinghorne
- 2010 - The Legacy of Robert Boyle - Then and Now, by John Hedley Brooke, with a response by Geoffrey Cantor
- 2011 - Is the World Unfinished? On Interactions between Science and Theology, by Jürgen Moltmann, with a response by Alan Torrance
- 2012 - Christ and Evolution: A Drama of Wisdom, by Celia Deane-Drummond, with a response by Fount LeRon Shults
- 2013 - Science and Religion in Dialogue, by John Polkinghorne, with a response by Richard Chartres
- 2014 - New Atheism – New Apologetics: The Use of Science in Recent Christian Apologetic Writings, by Alister McGrath, with a response by Richard Harries
- 2015 - Natural Theology Revisited (Again), by Russell Re Manning, with a response by Louise Hickman
- 2016 - Natural Theology in a Changed Key? Evolution, Cooperation, and the God Question, by Sarah Coakley, with a response by Christopher Insole
- 2017 - Theological Influences in Scientific Research Programmes: Natural Theology 'in Reverse', by Robert J. Russell, with a response by Rowan Williams
- 2018 - Apocalypses Now: Modern Science and Biblical Miracles, by Mark Harris, with a response by John Hedley Brooke
- 2019 - Science, Religion and Ethics, by Michael Reiss
- 2020 - Mental Health and the Gospel, by Christopher Cook, with a response by Fraser Watts
- 2021 - The Rediscovery of Contemplation Through Science, by Tom McLeish, with a response by Rowan Williams
- 2022 - "God and a World of Natural Evil: Theology and Science in Hard Conversation" by Prof Christopher Southgate, with a response by Andrew Davidson.
- 2023 - “Attending to Attention” by The Rt Revd and Rt Hon the Lord (Rowan) Williams of Oystermouth, with response from Dr John Teasdale
- 2024 - “Is religion natural?” by The Very Revd Professor David Fergusson, OBE, FRSE, FBA, Regius Professor of Divinity at the University of Cambridge, Dean of the Chapel Royal in Scotland and Dean of the Order of the Thistle, with response from Professor Fiona Ellis, Professor of Philosophy, and Director of the Centre for Practical Philosophy, Theology, and Religion at the University of Roehampton, London.
- 2025 - Science, Technology, Theology, and Spirituality: A Necessary Partnership?, by Antje Jackelén, with a response by Arthur C. Petersen.
