= Staller =

Staller is a surname. Notable people with the surname include:

- Brock Staller (born 1992), Canadian rugby union player
- Eric Staller (born 1947), American artist who uses light and architecture
- George Staller (1916–1992), American outfielder, scout and coach in Major League Baseball
- Ilona Staller (born 1951), Hungarian-born Italian politician, porn-star, and singer
- Thomas Staller (died 1606), English Anglican priest and Archdeacon of Rochester

== See also ==
- Staller Saddle, a mountain pass in the Alps
