= William Bradford (priest) =

English Anglican priest

William Bradford (b Middlesex 1696; d Rochester 1728) was an English Anglican priest.

The son of Samuel Bradford, Master of Corpus Christi College, Cambridge from 1716 to 1724, he himself was educated there. He became a Fellow of Corpus in 1717 and Vicar of St Nicholas, Newcastle upon Tyne in 1721. He was Archdeacon of Rochester from 23 June 1728 until his death on 15 July that year.
