= Norman Warren =

Norman Warren may refer to:

- Norman J. Warren (born 1942), English film director
- Norman Warren (priest) (born 1934), Anglican priest and author
