= Thomas Sprat =

English churchman and writer (1635–1713)

The Right Reverend Thomas Sprat FRS
- Bishop of Rochester
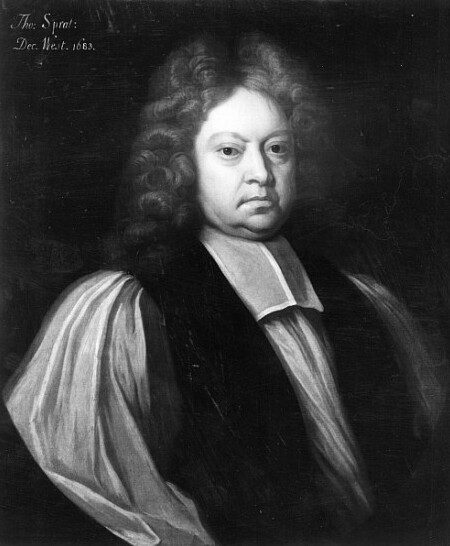
- Sprat by Michael Dahl
- Province: Canterbury
- Diocese: Rochester
- Installed: 1684
- Predecessor: Francis Turner
- Successor: Francis Atterbury
- Other posts: Dean of Westminster

Orders
- Ordination: 1660 or earlier
- Consecration: 2 November 1684 by William Sancroft

Personal details
- Born: 1635 Beaminster, Dorset
- Died: 20 May 1713 (aged 77–78) Bromley, Kent
- Buried: St Nicholas' Chapel
- Denomination: Church of England
- Residence: Bishop's Palace, Bromley
- Spouse: Helen Wolseley
- Children: Thomas Sprat FRS, Archdeacon of Rochester
- Profession: Clergyman
- Education: Wadham College, Oxford

Thomas Sprat, FRS (1635 – 20 May 1713) was an English churchman and writer, Bishop of Rochester from 1684.

== Life ==
Sprat was born at Beaminster, Dorset, and educated at Wadham College, Oxford, where he held a fellowship from 1657 to 1670. Having taken orders he became a prebendary of Lincoln Cathedral in 1660. In the preceding year he had gained a reputation by his poem To the Happie Memory of the most Renowned Prince Oliver, Lord Protector (London, 1659), and he was afterwards well known as a wit, preacher and man of letters.

In 1669 Sprat became canon of Westminster Abbey, and in 1670 rector of Uffington, Lincolnshire. He was chaplain to Charles II in 1676, curate and lecturer at St Margaret's, Westminster, in 1679, canon of Chapel Royal, Windsor in 1681, Dean of Westminster in 1683 and Bishop of Rochester in 1684. He was appointed Dean of the Chapel Royal in 1685 and was Clerk of the Closet from 1685 to 1687.

Sprat was a member of James II's ecclesiastical commission, and in 1688 he read the Declaration of Indulgence to empty benches in Westminster Abbey. The suggestion was that he was playing at being Vicar of Bray. Although he opposed the motion of 1689 declaring the throne vacant, he assisted at the coronation of William III and Mary II. As Dean of Westminster he directed Christopher Wren's restoration of the abbey.

In 1692 a bizarre attempt was made to implicate Sprat in a plot to restore the deposed king James II. This became known as the "flowerpot plot" because it involved a conspirator—a man named Robert Young — forging Sprat's signature on a document, smuggling it into the Bishop's manor and hiding the paper under a flowerpot. The authorities were contacted about the document, which led to the Bishop's arrest for high treason and the searching of his house—the forged document was eventually found where Young had said it would be. However, Sprat was soon freed when it became clear that there was no case to answer.

He died of apoplexy in 1713 at the Bishop's Palace in Bromley, Kent and was buried on the south side of St Nicholas' Chapel in Westminster Abbey. The monument is by Francis Bird.

== Works ==
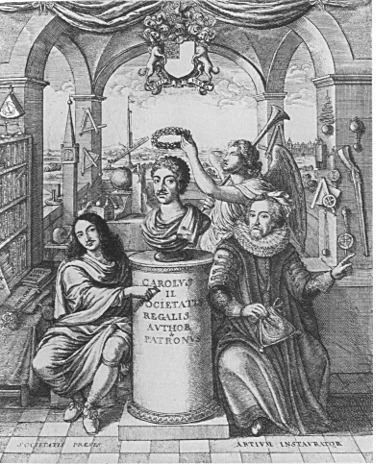
Frontispiece to A History of the Royal Society, showing the crowning of King Charles II. Sir Francis Bacon is shown on the right; William Brouncker, 2nd Viscount Brouncker, the president of the Society, is on the left.

Sprat's major prose works are the Observations upon Monsieur de Sorbier's Voyage into England (London, 1665), a satirical reply to the strictures on Englishmen in Samuel de Sorbière's book Relation d'un voyage en Angleterre (Paris, 1664), and a History of the Royal Society of London (London, 1667), which Sprat had helped to found. The History of the Royal Society elaborates the scientific purposes of the academy and outlines some of the strictures of scientific writing that set the modern standards for clarity and conciseness.

A collection of ten of his sermons was published in 1710.

For his work on the history of science he was elected a Fellow of the Royal Society in 1663.

== Family ==
He married Helen, the daughter of Devereux Wolseley of Ravenstone, Staffordshire and was the father of Thomas Sprat, Archdeacon of Rochester and Fellow of the Royal Society. Shortly after the elder Sprat's death, his son was made a canon of Westminster Abbey.

== Notes ==
Church of England titles
| Preceded by John Dolben | Dean of Westminster; 1683–1713 | Succeeded by Francis Atterbury |
| Preceded by Francis Turner | Bishop of Rochester; 1684–1713 | Succeeded by Francis Atterbury |
