= Lectionary 234 =

Lectionary ℓ 234
- New Testament manuscript
- Text: Evangelistarium †
- Date: 13th century
- Script: Greek
- Now at: Sion College
- Size: 25.5 cm by 21.2 cm

Lectionary 234, designated by siglum ℓ 234 (in the Gregory-Aland numbering) is a Greek manuscript of the New Testament, on parchment. Palaeographically it has been assigned to the 13th century. Scrivener labelled it by 235^{evl}. Some leaves of the codex were lost.

== Description ==
The codex contains lessons from the Gospels of John, Matthew, Luke lectionary (Evangelistarium), with some lacunae. Some leaves were supplied by a later hand.

The text is written in Greek minuscule letters, on 246 parchment leaves (25.5 cm by 21.2 cm). The writing is in two columns per page, 19-20 lines per page. It contains musical notes in red.

The leaves 241 and 242 are palimpsests. The lower and earlier text was written in uncial letters in the 7th century.

There are daily lessons from Easter to Pentecost.

== History ==
Scrivener dated the manuscript to the 12th century, Gregory to the 13th century. It has been assigned by the Institute for New Testament Textual Research to the 13th century.

The manuscript was in the possession of Edward Payne (as number 2), who presented it for the Sion College (along with manuscripts 559 and ℓ 235).

The manuscript was added to the list of New Testament manuscripts by Scrivener (number 227) and Gregory (number 234). Gregory saw it in 1883.

The manuscript was examined and described by Steenbuch.

The manuscript is not cited in the critical editions of the Greek New Testament (UBS3).

The codex is housed at the Sion College (Arc L 40.2/G 1) in London.

== See also ==
- List of New Testament lectionaries
- Biblical manuscript
- Textual criticism
- Lectionary 236

== Bibliography ==
- C. Steenbuch, Evangelistarium 234 (Scrivener: 227), JTS XVI (1915), 416-419
