= John Law (priest) =

18th-century Anglican priest

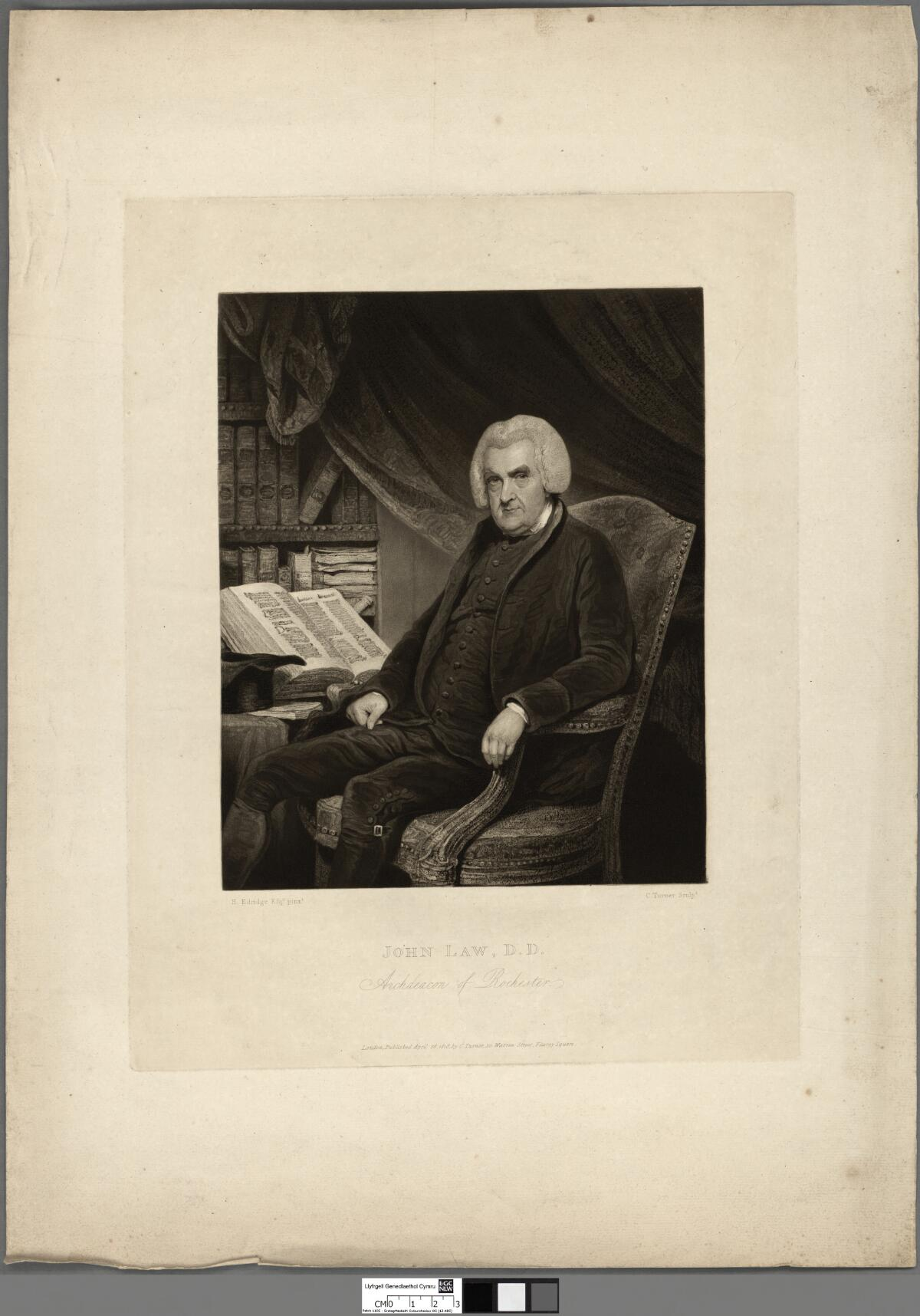
Mezzotint portrait of Law by Charles Turner from the National Library of Wales, 1818

John Law, D.D. (b Bombay 31 January 1739 - d Rochester 5 February 1827) was an Anglican priest, most notably Archdeacon of Rochester from 3 September 1767 until his death.

Law was educated at Harrow; and Emmanuel College, Cambridge. He held livings at Wateringbury, Shorne, Chatham, Westmill and Great Easton.

== Notes ==
Church of England titles
Preceded by John Denne	Archdeacon of Rochester; 1767–1827	Succeeded by Walker King
