= Julian Tregoning =

British merchant banker

- Born: 24 October 1946 (age 79)
- Education: Headfort School
- Alma mater: Britannia Royal Naval College, Dartmouth
- Occupation: Banker
- Spouse: Tessa Jane Lanyon
- Children: 2
- Parents: John L. Tregoning (father); Sioned Georgina C. Strick (mother)

Julian George Tregoning (born 24 October 1946) is a British banker. He was a director of BNY Mellon, chairman of the United Kingdom's Investment Management Association and president of the European Fund & Asset Management Association. Since 2017, he has been chairman of HALO Global Asset Management.

== Early life ==
Tregoning was born on 24 October 1946, the son of Colonel John Langford Tregoning, a senior officer in the Royal Regiment of Artillery, and Sioned Georgina C. Strick. He was educated at Headfort School, County Meath, Ireland before attending Britannia Royal Naval College, Dartmouth. As an officer cadet, he suffered a skiing accident while competing for the Royal Navy in the Inter Service Ski and Snowsports Competition in Kitzbuehl, Austria. Tregoning left the navy and took up a training position at Save & Prosper in 1968.

== Career ==
Tregoning became a director of Save & Prosper in 1985, heading its international and offshore business. In 1995, he moved to Robert Fleming & Co. as a director, overseeing its operations in Latin America. He then joined the investment bank Mellon Financial as director and representative of its London office. He remained at the bank after its merger with the Bank of New York, forming BNY Mellon, the world's largest custodian bank. From 2015 to 2020, Tregoning was deputy chairman of SAUL, the University of London's £2.5 billion pension scheme.

Tregoning was chairman of the UK's Investment Management Association from 1993 to 1995. From 1997 to 1998, he was president of the European Fund & Asset Management Association in Brussels.

=== City of London ===
From 2001 to 2002, Tregoning was Master of the Worshipful Company of Grocers, one of the Great Twelve City Livery Companies.

He is chairman of the City of London's Mansion House Scholarship Scheme and a trustee of the revived Boyle Lectures.
