= William Worthington (priest) =

English priest and theological writer (1703–1778)

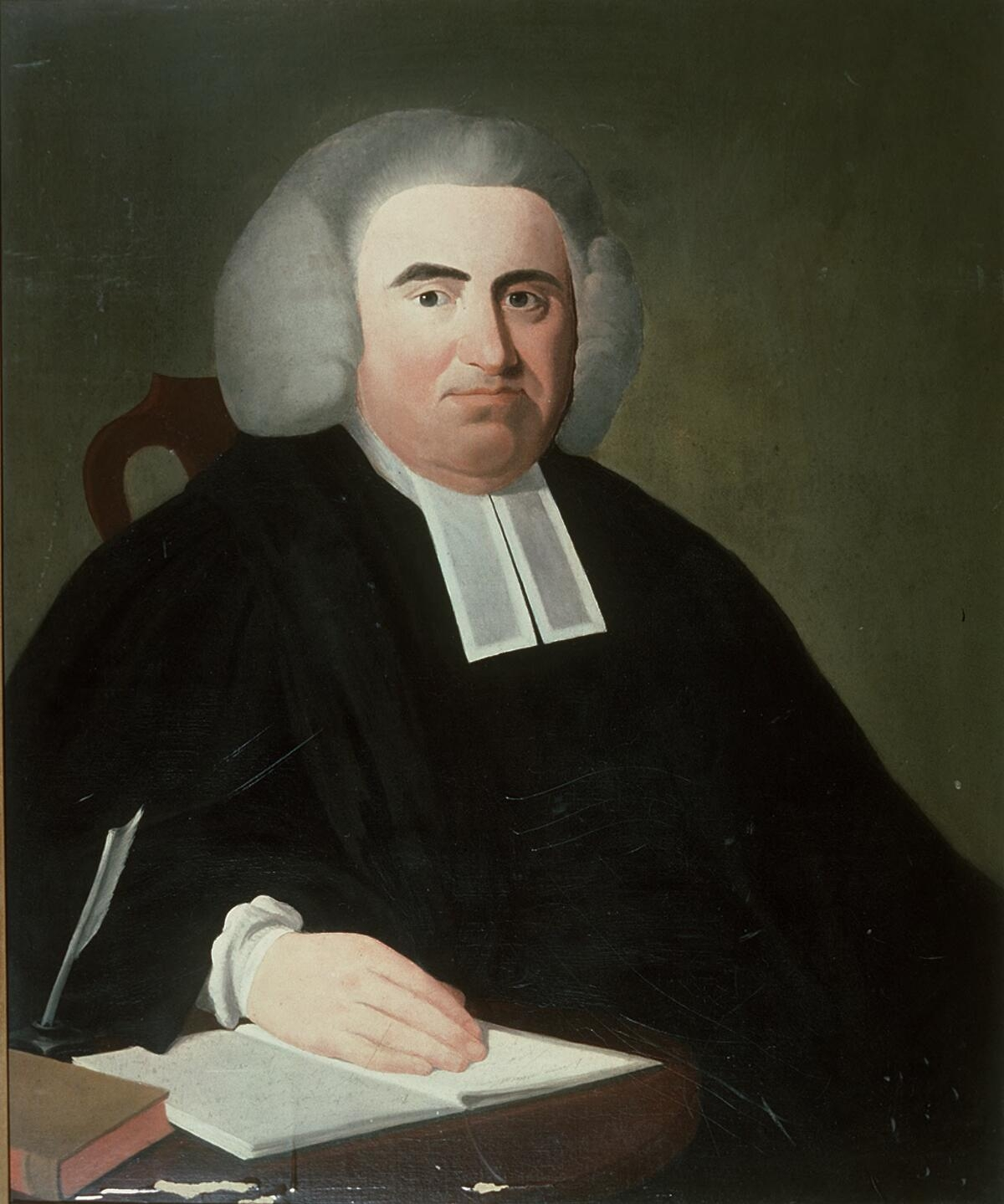
Portrait of William Worthington circa 1770

William Worthington (1703 – 6 October 1778) was an Anglican priest and theological writer.

== Life ==
Worthington was born in 1703 and educated at Oswestry School before moving to Jesus College, Oxford. He matriculated in 1722 and obtained his Bachelor of Arts (BA) degree in 1726. He became usher of Oswestry School in 1726 and was ordained priest, becoming vicar of Llanyblodwell in Shropshire in 1729 through Francis Hare, Bishop of St Asaph. Worthington obtained a Cambridge Master of Arts (MA Cantab) degree from St John's College, Cambridge in 1730, and Bachelor of Divinity (BD) and Doctor of Divinity (DD) degrees from the University of Oxford in 1738. In 1748, Hare presented Worthington to the post of vicar of Llanrhaeadr in Denbighshire, Wales. He was appointed in 1768 as a canon of York Minster by Robert Hay Drummond, Archbishop of York, who had previously been Bishop of St Asaph and for whom Worthington had acted as chaplain. He held other honorary parish positions, in Darowen, Montgomeryshire and Hope, Flintshire. He died in Llanrhaeadr on 6 October 1778, leaving money to missionary societies in his will.

== Works ==
Worthington wrote on the subject of the Book of Job in An Essay on ... Man's Redemption' (1743), which disagreed with the views of William Warburton (later Bishop of Gloucester). He delivered the Boyle Lectures in 1776 to 1778, with his lectures being published under the title The Evidence of Christianity (1769). He wrote on other theological topics, including two replies to a dissenting cleric's Essay on Demoniacks (1777 and 1779).
