= Samuel Bradford =

English churchman

Right Reverend Samuel Bradford
- Bishop of Rochester
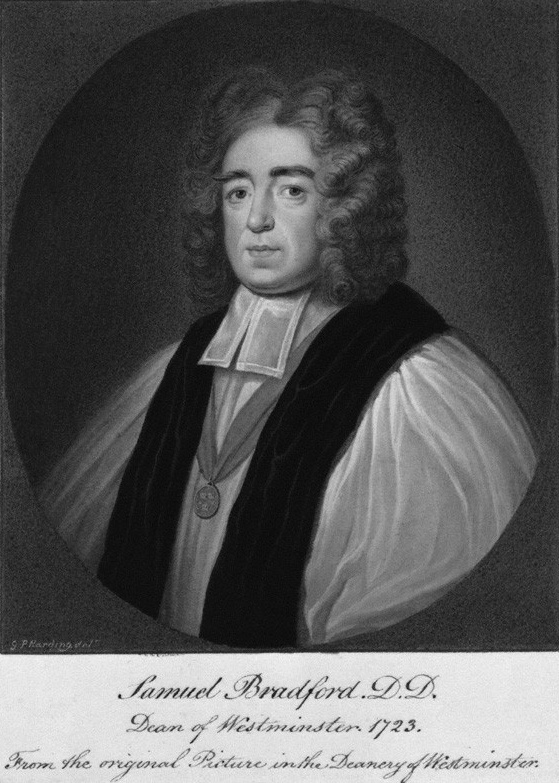
- Nineteenth-century portrait of Bradford (copy by George Perfect Harding)
- Church: Church of England
- Diocese: Diocese of Rochester
- Elected: 1723
- Term ended: 1731 (death)
- Predecessor: Francis Atterbury
- Successor: Joseph Wilcocks
- Other posts: Bishop of Carlisle; 1718–1723; Dean of Westminster; 1723–1731

Orders
- Consecration: 1 June 1718 by William Wake

Personal details
- Born: 20 December 1652 St. Anne's, Blackfriars
- Died: 17 May 1731 (aged 78) The Deanery, Westminster
- Buried: Westminster Abbey
- Denomination: Anglican
- Residence: The Deanery, Westminster
- Parents: William Bradford of London
- Spouse: wife (née Ellis)
- Children: 2 daughters; 1 son: Revd William
- Education: Corpus Christi College, Cambridge

Samuel Bradford (20 December 1652 – 17 May 1731) was an English churchman and whig, bishop successively of Carlisle and Rochester.

== Life ==
He was the son of William Bradford of London and was born in St. Anne's, Blackfriars. He was educated at St Paul's School; and when the school was closed, owing to the Great Plague of London and the Great Fire of London, he attended Charterhouse School. He was admitted to Corpus Christi College, Cambridge, in 1669, but left without a degree in consequence of religious scruples.

He devoted himself for a time to the study of medicine; but he was admitted in 1680, through the favour of Archbishop William Sancroft, to the degree of M.A. by royal mandate. He only took holy orders after the Glorious Revolution of 1689, and in the meantime acted as private tutor in the families of several country gentlemen. Bradford was ordained deacon and priest in 1690, and in the spring of the following year was elected by the governors of St. Thomas's Hospital the minister of their church in Southwark. He soon received the lectureship of St. Mary-le-Bow, and was tutor to the two grandsons of Archbishop John Tillotson, with whom he resided at Carlisle House, Lambeth. In November 1693 Tillotson collated Bradford to the rectory of St. Mary-le-Bow; he then resigned his minor ecclesiastical preferments, but soon after accepted the lectureship of All Hallows, Bread Street.

Bradford was a frequent preacher before the corporation of London, and was a staunch whig. On 30 January 1698 he preached before William III, who that March following appointed Bradford one of the royal chaplains in ordinary. The appointment was continued by Queen Anne, by whose command he was created D.D. on the occasion of her visit to the University of Cambridge, 16 April 1705.

In 1699 Bradford delivered the Boyle lecture in St. Paul's Cathedral. He was elected master of Corpus Christi College on 17 May 1716; and on 21 April 1718 was nominated to the bishopric of Carlisle, to which he was consecrated on 1 June. In 1723 he was translated to the see of Rochester, and was also appointed dean of Westminster, which he held in commendam with the bishopric of Rochester. In 1724 Bradford resigned the mastership of Corpus Christi, and in 1725 became the first dean of the revived Order of the Bath.

He died at the deanery of Westminster, and was buried in Westminster Abbey with a monument by Henry Cheere.

== Works ==
Bradford published more than 20 separate sermons. One of these, Discourse concerning Baptismal and Spiritual Regeneration, 2nd ed., London, 1709, attained popularity. A ninth edition was published in 1819 by the Society for Promoting Christian Knowledge. As Boyle lecturer he preached eight sermons on The Credibility of the Christian Revelation, from its Intrinsick Evidence. These, with a ninth sermon preached in his own church in January 1700, were issued with other Boyle lectures delivered between 1691 and 1732, in A Defence of Natural and Revealed Religion, &c. 3 vols., London, 1739.

== Family ==
Bradford's wife, who survived him, was a daughter of Captain Ellis of Medbourne in Leicestershire, and bore him one son and two daughters. One of the latter was married to Reuben Clarke, archdeacon of Essex, and the other to John Denne, archdeacon of Rochester. His son, the Revd William Bradford, died on 15 July 1728, aged thirty-two, when he was archdeacon of Rochester and vicar of Newcastle upon Tyne.

== Notes ==
Academic offices
Preceded by Thomas Green	Master of Corpus Christi College, Cambridge; 1716–1724	Succeeded by Matthias Mawson
Church of England titles
Preceded by William Nicolson	Bishop of Carlisle; 1718–1723	Succeeded by John Waugh
Preceded by Francis Atterbury	Bishop of Rochester; 1723–1731	Succeeded by Joseph Wilcocks
Preceded by Francis Atterbury	Dean of Westminster; 1723–1731	Succeeded by Joseph Wilcocks
