= Elizeus Burgess =

English Anglican priest

Elizeus Burgess (1595–1652) was an English Anglican priest.

Burgess was educated at the St John's College, Oxford. He was Rector appointed of Cuxton in 1625; Archdeacon of Rochester in 1621; Canon of Ely in 1630; Vicar of St. Nicholas, Rochester in 1628; and Rector of Southfleet the same year.
