= Zachary Pearce =

English bishop

Right Reverend Zachary Pearce
- Bishop of Rochester
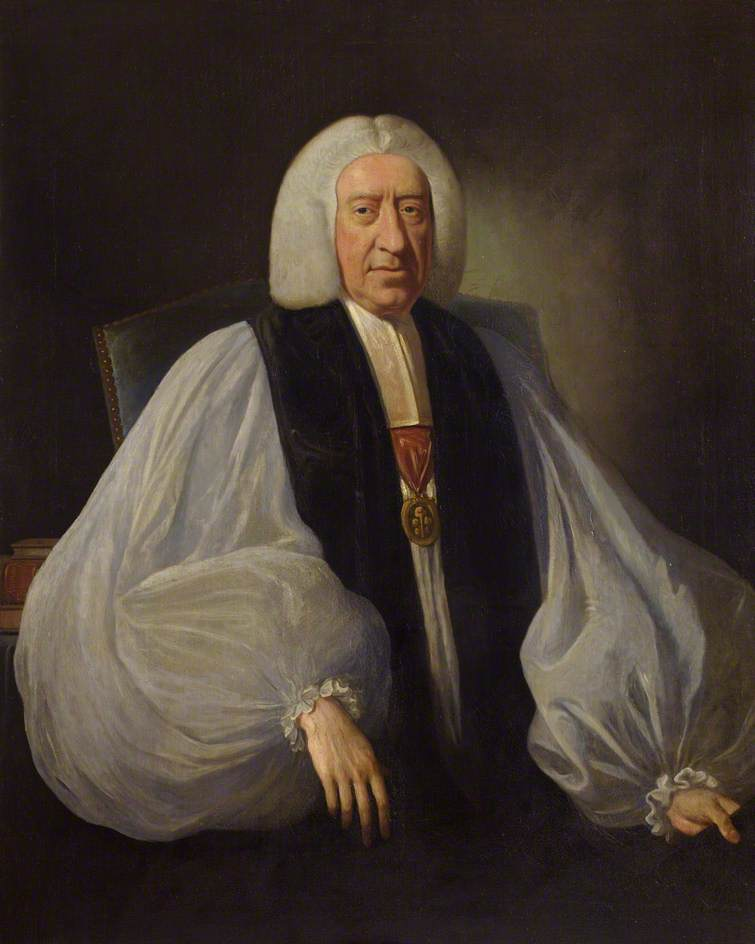
- Portrait by Edward Penny
- Installed: 1756
- Term ended: 1774
- Predecessor: Joseph Wilcocks
- Successor: John Thomas
- Other posts: Bishop of Bangor, Dean of Westminster

Personal details
- Born: 8 September 1690
- Died: 29 June 1774 (aged 83)
- Denomination: Church of England
- Education: Trinity College, Cambridge

Zachary Pearce (8 September 1690 – 29 June 1774), sometimes known as Zachariah Pearce, was an English Bishop of Bangor and Bishop of Rochester. He was a controversialist and a notable early critical writer defending John Milton, attacking Richard Bentley's 1732 edition of Paradise Lost the following year.

== Life ==
Pearce was born the son of Thomas or John Pearce, a distiller, in 1690 in the parish of St Giles, High Holborn. He first attended Great Ealing School and then Westminster School. He graduated BA from Trinity College, Cambridge in 1713/4 and MA in 1717.

He was Fellow of Trinity College, Cambridge (1716–1720) and chaplain to the Lord Chancellor, Thomas Parker, 1st Earl of Macclesfield. Parker became his patron, to whom Pearce dedicated an edition of the De oratore of Cicero. He became rector of Stapleford Abbotts, Essex (1719–1722) and St Batholemew, Royal Exchange (1720–1724) He was vicar of St Martin-in-the-Fields, London, in 1726. He was then Dean of Winchester in 1739, Bishop of Bangor in 1748, and Bishop of Rochester in 1756. In 1761 he turned down the position of bishop of London. He was Dean of Westminster (1756–1768).

He was elected a Fellow of the Royal Society in June 1720. Towards the end of Isaac Newton's life, Pearce assisted him on chronology.

There is a monument to Pearce in the Church of St Peter and St Paul, Bromley. He had married Mary, daughter of Benjamin Adams, a distiller, of Holborn.

== Works ==
The Miracles of Jesus Vindicated (1729) was written against Thomas Woolston. A Reply to the Letter to Dr. Waterland was against Conyers Middleton, defending Daniel Waterland; Pearce engaged in this controversy as a former student of William Wake.

Other works were:

- Cicero, Dialogi tres de oratore (1716)
- Longinus, De sublimitate commentarius (1724)
- Cicero, De officiis libri tres (1745)

He also published sermons; he preached at the funeral of Sir Hans Sloane.

Church of England titles
Preceded by Charles Naylor	Dean of Winchester; 1739–1748	Succeeded by Thomas Cheyney
Preceded by Matthew Hutton	Bishop of Bangor; 1748–1756	Succeeded by John Egerton
Preceded by Joseph Wilcocks	Bishop of Rochester; 1756–1774	Succeeded by John Thomas
Preceded by Joseph Wilcocks	Dean of Westminster; 1756–1768	Succeeded by John Thomas
