= Sion College =

Church of England college in London

Coordinates: 51°30′41″N 0°6′24″W

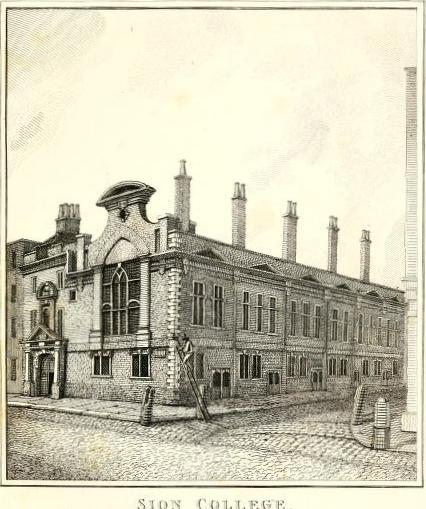
Sion College, 1791 engraving by John Thomas Smith

Sion College, in London, is an institution founded by royal charter in 1630 as a college, guild of parochial clergy and almshouse, under the 1623 will of Thomas White, vicar of St Dunstan's in the West.

The clergy who benefit by the foundation are the incumbents of the City parishes, of parishes which adjoined the city bounds when the college was founded, and of parishes subsequently formed out of these.

== History ==
Sion College was created by the first charter granted by King Charles I in 1630.

The original buildings in London Wall were on a site previously occupied by Elsing Spital, a hospital for the blind founded in 1329, and earlier still by a nunnery. They comprised the almshouses, a hall and chapel, and the library added to the foundation by John Simson, rector of St Olave Hart Street, one of White's executors. There were also, at least originally, apartments for students. The site was bounded by London Wall, Philip Lane, and Gayspur Lane (now Aldermanbury), roughly where Aldermanbury Square now stands. The first Court (committee) from 1630 consisted of John Gifford (President), Thomas Worrall and John Simson (Deans), and Francis Dee, Cornelius Burges, Edward Abbott and Thomas Wood (Assistants).

In the 1640s Sion College was regarded as a stronghold of the London presbyterians, their "de facto headquarters", and it took on a collective role from around 1645. The administration of the College fell into the hands of the parliamentarian side during 1643, as John Sedgwick of St Alphege London Wall took on the royalists President James Marsh, archdeacon of Chichester, and Edward Sparke. A work from 1646 by Anthony Burges claimed support from College members including the President Arthur Jackson, There were attacks on the College by the Independents John Goodwin (Sion-Colledg visited and Neophytopresbyteros) and John Price (1625?–1691) (The Pulpit Incendiary, 1648), and it was defended by Cornelius Burges (Sion College what it is, and doeth, 1648). William Jenkyn also attacked Goodwin (The Busie Bishop, or the Visitor Visited, and The Blind Guide, or Doling Doctor, 1648).

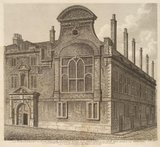
Sion College, the north front (1800)

From 1647 to 1659 the provincial synod met there, leading to the name "Sion College Conclave"; There was a practical distinction, the London Provincial Assembly consisting of elders rather than all ministers. The first synod took particular aim at John Milton's divorce tracts, beginning a polemic relationship with Milton. The Serious and Faithfull Representation (January 1649) of 47 London ministers, a work against Oliver Cromwell, arose from an assembly in the College; Milton's The Tenure of Kings and Magistrates from February of that year is in part an answer, and snipes at the ministers.

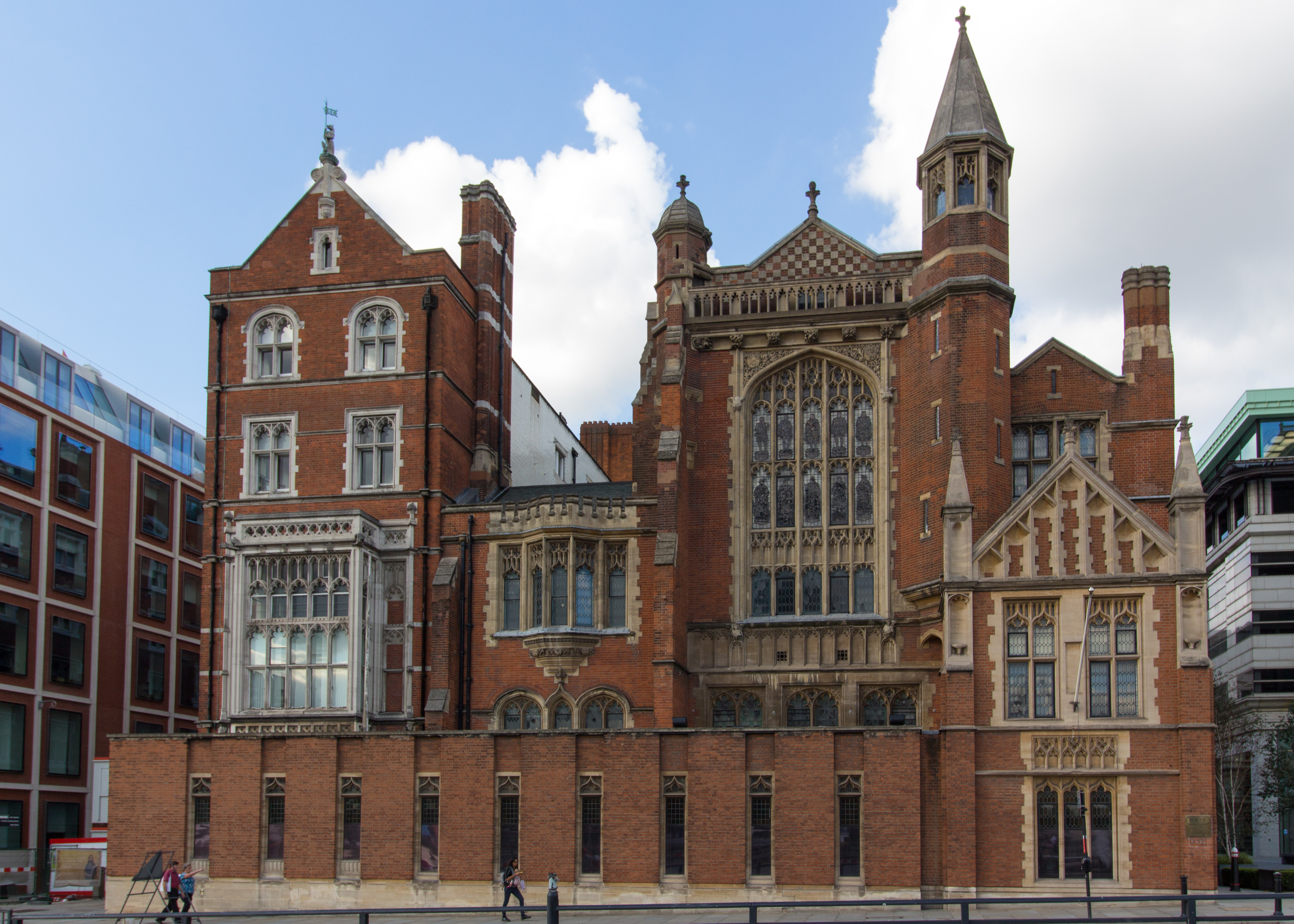
The former Sion College building on Victoria Embankment

The College was badly damaged in the Great Fire of London. In 1884 the almshouses were abolished, and the almsfolk became out-pensioners. It was subsequently found possible to extend their numbers from the original number of two men and two women to 40 in all, and to increase the pension. In 1886 Sion College was moved to new buildings at 56 Victoria Embankment, between Carmelite Street and John Carpenter Street. It became principally known for its theological library which served as a lending library to members of the college, and was accessible to the public. A governing body appointed by the members to administer the foundation includes a president, two deans and four assistants.

In 1996, the college disposed of its large Victorian premises on the banks of the River Thames. The building has been converted into offices. The library was closed June 1996, with the manuscripts, pamphlets, and pre-1850 printed books going to Lambeth Palace Library, and newer books to The Maughan Library, King's College London. Its activities now take place in a variety of locations.

== Presidents ==
Source: Pearce, Appendix A.

=== Charter to 1699 ===
- Charter. John Gifford D.D. Rector of St Michael Bassishaw.
- 1631, 1632. Thomas Westfield D.D. Rector of St Bartholomew the Great.
- 1633. John Hackett, D.D. Rector of St Andrew Holborn and Archdeacon of Bedford.
- 1634. Thomas Worrall D.D. of St Buttolphes Bishopsgate.
- 1635. William Fuller D.D. Vicar of St Giles without Criplegate.
- 1636. 1637. Jonathan Browne D.D. Dean of Hereford, Rector of St Faiths.
- 1638. William Brough D.D.. Rector of St Michael Cornhill.
- 1639. Richard Houldsworth, D.D. Rector of St Peter le poore.
- 1640. Michael Jermyn D.D., Rector of St Martyns Ludgate.
- 1641. John Grant D.D., Rector of St Bartholemew neare the Exchange.
- 1642. Mathias Stiles D.D., Rector of St George Buttolphe Lane.
- 1643. James Marshe D.D., Rector of St Dunstanes in the West [sequestered].
- 1643. Andrew Janaway B.D. Rector of All Hallows on the Wall.
- 1644. John Ley B.D. Rector of St Mary Hill.
- 1645. George Walker B.D. Rector of St John Evangelist.
- 1646. Arthur Jackson, B.D. Rector of St Michaell Woodstreet.
- 1647. 1648. Cornelius Burges D.D.
- 1649. William Gouge D.D. Anne Blackfryars.
- 1650. Edmond Calamy of Mary Aldermanbury.
- 1651. Lazarus Seaman of All Saints Bread St.
- 1653, 1654, 1655. James Cranford, Rector of Christophers behinde the Exchange.
- 1656, 1657. Samuel Clarke. Minister of Bennet Finck.
- 1658. Charles Offspring. Minister of Antholins.
- 1659. Edward Reynolds. Minister of St Lawrence Jury.
- 1660. Matthew Haviland. Minister of Trinity Parish.
- 1661. 1662. Robert Pory. Rector of St Buttolphs Bishopsgate.
- 1663. Christopher Shute. Rector of St Vedast, Foster Lane.
- 1664, 1665. Samuel Bolton. Rector of St Peters Poore.
- 1666. Matthew Smallwood. Rector of St Martine Outwich.
- 1667, 1668, 1669. John Lake. Rector of St Buttolph Bishoppsgate.
- 1670, 1671. Daniel Mills. Rector of St Olave Hartstreet.
- 1672, 1673, 1674. William Bell. Vicar of St Sepulchres,
- 1675. Charles Mason, D.D. Rector of St Peter the Poore.
- 1676. John Meriton. Rector of St Michaell Cornehill.
- 1677. 1678. George Gifford. Rector of St Dunstan in the East.
- 1679. Ambrose Atfield. Rector of St Mary Somerset.
- 1680. Robert Grove. Rector of St Mary Ax.
- 1681. William Beveridge. Rector of St Peters Cornehill.
- 1682. Clement Zanchy. Rector of St Clement, Eastcheap. 4 Dec.. Declined to serve. William Bell (see 1672).
- 1683. William Sherlock, D.D. Rector of St George, Buttolph Lane.
- 1684. 1685, 1686. Benjamin Woodroffe, D.D. Rector of St Bartholomew the little neare the Exchange.
- 1687, 1688. Henry Dove. Vicar of St Brigetts alias Brides.
- 1689. Jeremy Dodson. Rector of St Katherine Coleman.
- 1690. Edward Fowler, D.D. Vicar of St Giles without Criplegate.
- 1691. 1692, 1693. John Williams, D.D. Rector of St Mildreds Poultry.
- 1694. John Hall, Rector of St Christophers le Stock.
- 1695. Francis Thompson, D.D. Rector of the United Parishes of St Mathew Fryday Street and St Peter Cheap.
- 1696. Thomas Greene, D.D. Rector of the United Parishes of St Olave Jewry and St Martins Ironmonger Lane.
- 1697. Edward Lake, D.D. Rector of the United Parishes of St Mary At Hill and St Andrew Hubbard.
- 1698. Thomas Whincop, D.D. Rector of the United Parishes of St Mary Abchurch and St Laurence Pountney.
- 1699. Edward Smith, Rector of St Michaell Bassishaw.

=== 1700–1799 ===
- 1700. Joshua Richardson. Rector of Alhallowes on the Wall.
- 1701. Richard Lucas, D.D. Rector of St Stephen Coleman street.
- 1702. John Grant. Vicar of St Dunstan in the West.
- 1703. Lionell Gatford. Rector of St Dionis Back Church.
- 1704. Edward Waple. Rector of St Sepulchres.
- 1705. Marmaduke Hopkins. Rector of the United Parishes of St Vedast alias foster and St Michaell Quern.
- 1706. Thomas Lynford, D.D. Rector of the United Parishes of St Edmond the King and St Nicholas Aeons.
- 1707. John Mapletoft, D.D. Rector of the United Parishes of St Laurence Jewry and St Magdalen Milkstreet.
- 1708. Humfrey Zouch. Rector of Alhallowes Lombard Street.
- 1709. John Gascarth, D.D. Rector of Alhallows Barkin.
- 1710. William Stonestreet, Rector of the United Parishes of St Stephen Walbrook and St Bennet Sherehog.
- 1711. William Bedford, D.D. Rector of the United Parishes of St Botolph Billingsgate and St George, Botolph Lane.
- 1712. James Gardiner Rector of St Michael Crooked Lane.
- 1713. William Whitfield. Rector of St Martins Ludgate.
- 1714. 1715. Lilly Butler, D.D. Minister of St Mary Aldermanbury.
- 1716. Samuel Bradford, D.D. Rector of St Mary le Bow.
- 1717. Robert Lasinby, A.M. Rector St Antholin and St John Baptist.
- 1718. George Martin. Rector of St Mildred Poultry.
- 1719. Roger Altham, D.D. Rector of St Botolph, Bishopsgate.
- 1720. John Hancock, D.D. Rector of St Margaret, Lothbury. 4 A.
- 1721. William Strengfellow, M.A. Rector of St Dunstans in the East.
- 1722. Richard Broderick, D.D. Rector of St Michael Bassishaw.
- 1723. Sampson Eastwick [or Estwick], B.D. Rector of St Michael Queenhithe.
- 1724. Montague Wood. Rector of St Michael Royal and St Martin Vintry.
- 1725. Samuel Baker. Rector of St Michaels Cornhill.
- 1726. Thomas Cooke. Rector of St Bennet Pauls Wharf.
- 1727. Thomas Bray, D.D. . Minister of St Botolphs Aldgate. i
- 1728. Richard Sear. Rector of St Albans Wood Street and St Olaves Silverstreet.
- 1729. Edward Oliver, D.D. Rector of St Mary Abchurch and St Laurence Pountney.
- 1730. William Butler, LL.B. Rector of St Anne s Aldersgate and St John Zachary.
- 1731. John Hay, D.D. Vicar of St Stephens Colemanstreet.
- 1732. Thomas Spateman. Rector of St Bartholomews the Great near Smithfield.
- 1733. Joseph Watson, D.D. Rector of St Stephens Walbrook.
- 1734. Thomas Mangey, D.D. Rector of St Mildreds, Bread Street.
- 1735. Francis Barnard, D.D. Rector of St Bartholomews Exchange.
- 1736. Joseph Roper, D.D. Rector of St Nicholas Coleabby.
- 1737. Edward Arrowsmith, M.A. Rector of St Olave, Hart Street.
- 1738. Ralf Skerret, D.D. Rector of St Peters Poor.
- 1739. Anthony Ellys, D.D. Rector of St Olave Jewry.
- 1740. William Crowe, D.D. Rector of St Botolph, Bishopsgate.
- 1741. William Berriman, D.D. Rector of St Andrew Undershaft.
- 1742. Joseph Trapp, D.D. Vicar of Christ Church and Rector of St Leonards Foster Lane.
- 1743. Thomas Moore, D.D. Minister of St Botolphs, Aldersgate.
- 1744. John Denne, D.D. Vicar of St Leonards Shoreditch.
- 1745. Reuben Clarke. Rector of St Magnus.
- 1746. Duncombe Bristowe. Minister of Allhallows Staining.
- 1747. Richard Biscoe. Rector of St Martins Outwich.
- 1748. William Best. Vicar of St Lawrence Jewry.
- 1749. William Reyner. Rector of St Mary Magdalen, Old Fish Street.
- 1750. William Warneford. Rector of All Hallows Bread Street.
- 1751. Edward Cobden, D.D. Rector of St Austin by St Pauls.
- 1752. William Sandford, D.D. Minister of St Mary Aldermanbury.
- 1753. Theodore Waterland, Minister of St Bennet Finck.
- 1754. Cutts Barton, M.A. Rector of St Andrew Holborn.
- 1755. Samuel Smith, LL.B. Rector of All Hallows London Wall.
- 1756. Fifield Allen. Rector of St Anne Aldersgate.
- 1757. John Cooksey, Rector of St Antholin. [He was only elected on 6 February 1758, owing to several refusals.]
- 1758. Thomas Birch. Rector of Saint Margaret Pattons, Rood Lane.
- 1759. John Thomas, D.D. Rector of St Peter, Cornhill.
- 1760. Thomas Newton, D.D. . Rector of St Mary Le Bow.
- 1761. William Brakenridge, D.D. Rector of St Michael Bassishaw. Librarian from 1745.
- 1762. Jeremiah Milles, D.D. . Dean of Exeter and Rector of St Edmund the King.
- 1763. Theophilus Lewis Barbauld. Rector of St Vedast Foster Lane. [He was only elected on 26 March 1764.]
- 1764. Ferdinando Warner, D.D. . Rector of St Mich. Queenhythe.
- 1765. John Doughty, M.A. Minister of St James Clerkenwell.
- 1766. Thomas Kemp, D.D. Rector of St Michael s, Crooked Lane.
- 1767. Benjamin Newcome, D.D. Rector of St Mildred Poultrey.
- 1768. Nicholas Fayting, M.A. Rector of St Martin Outwich
- 1769. James Townley, M.A. . Rector of St Bennet Gracechurch.
- 1770. Arnold King, LL.B. Rector of St Michael Cornhill.
- 1771. John Blakiston, M.A. Rector of St Ethelburga.
- 1772. Rowland Sandiford, M.A. Vicar of Christchurch.
- 1773. Daniel Burton, D.D. Rector of St Peter le Poor.
- 1774. William Parker, D.D. . Minister of St Catherine Creechurch.
- 1775. Anthony Webster, LL.D. Vicar of St Stephen Coleman Street.
- 1776. Ben Mence, M.A. Rector of Allhallows, London Wall.
- 1777. Henry Owen, M.D. Rector of St Olave Hart Street.
- 1778. Guyon Griffith, D.D. Rector of St Mary-at-Hill.
- 1779. Joseph Williamson, M.A. Vicar of St Dunstan in the West.
- 1780. James Waller, D.D. Rector of St Martin Ludgate.
- 1781. John Douglas, D.D. Rector of St Augustin.
- 1782. Peter Whalley, LL.B. . Rector of St Margaret Pattens.
- 1783. Samuel Carr, D.D. Rector of St Andrew Undershaft.
- 1784. Henry Whitfield, D.D. Rector of St Margaret Lothbury.
- 1785. Owen Perrott Edwardes, M.A. Rector of St Bartholomew the Great.
- 1786. James Trebeck, M.A. Rector of St Michaels Queen Hythe.
- 1787. Thomas Moore, M.A. Minister of St James Dukes place.
- 1788. Henry Fly, M.A. Minister of Trinity in the Minories.
- 1789. 1790. William Morice, D.D. Rector of Allhallows Bread Street.
- 1791. Theophilus Lane, M.A. Rector of St Michael Crooked Lane.
- 1792. Samuel Kettilby, D.D. Vicar of St Bartholomew the Less.
- 1793. Henry Jerome de Salis, D.D. Rector of St Antholins.
- 1794. Benjamin Underwood, M.A. Rector of St Mary Abchurch
- 1795. Edmund Gibson, A.M. Rector of St Bennet's, Paul's-Wharf.
- 1796. Robert Anthony Bromley, B.D. Rector of St Mildred's in the Poultry.
- 1797. William Gilbank, M.A. Rector of St Ethelburga.
- 1798. William Vincent, D.D. Rector of Allhallows, Thames Street.
- 1799. Charles Barton, M.A. Rector of St Andrew's, Holborn.

=== 1800–1891 ===
- 1800. 1801. John Moore, LL.B. Rector of St Michael's, Bassishaw.
- 1802, 1803. John Brand, M.A. Rector of the United Parishes of St Mary-at-Hill and St Andrew Hubbard.
- 1804. George Avery Hatch, M.A. Rector of St Matthew Friday Street and St Peter Cheap.
- 1805. George Gaskin, D.D. Rector of St Benet Gracechurch and St Leonard Eastcheap.
- 1806. Thomas Rennell, D.D. Dean of Winchester and Rector of St Magnus and St Margaret Fish street
- 1807, 1808. James Simpkinson, M.A. Rector of St Peter le Poor.
- 1809. Henry Meen, B.D. Rector of St Nicholas Coleabbey and St Nicholas Olaves.
- 1810. Thomas Robert Wrench, M.A. Rector of St Michael's, Cornhill.
- 1811. Richard Lendon, M.A. Rector of St John's Clerkenwell.
- 1812. William Antrobus, B.D. Rector of St Andrew's Undershaft.
- 1813. William Goode, M.A. . Rector of St Andrew Wardrobe and St Anne Black Friars.
- 1814. 1815. John Rose, D.D. Rector of St Martin's, Outwich.
- 1816. John Hutchins, M.A. Rector of St Anne and St Agnes, and St John Zachary.
- 1817. Robert Hamilton, D.D. Vicar of St Olave's, Jewry, and Rector of St Martin's, Ironmonger Lane.
- 1818. James Blenkarne, M.A. Vicar of St Helen's.
- 1819. Samuel Crowther, M.A. Vicar of Christ Church and Rector of St Leonard Foster Lane.
- 1820. Henry Budd, M.A. Minister of Bridewell Precinct.
- 1821. William St Andrew Vincent, M.A. Rector of Allhallows the Great and Allhallows the Less.
- 1822. West Wheldale, M.A. Rector of Christ Church, Spitalfields.
- 1823. Tindal Thompson Walmsley, D.D. Rector of St Vedast, Foster Lane, and St Michael Querne.
- 1824. Henry George Watkins, M.A. Rector of St Swithin London Stone and St Mary Bothaw.
- 1825. William Parker, M.A. Rector of St Ethelburga's.
- 1826. Daniell Mathias, M.A. Rector of St Mary s, Whitechapel.
- 1827. George Shepherd, D.D. Rector of St Bartholomew's, Exchange.
- 1828. Samuel Birch, M.A. Rector of St Mary Woolnoth and St Mary Woolchurch.
- 1829. Thomas Leigh, M.A. Rector of St Magnus and St Margaret, New Fish Street.
- 1830. Samuel Wix, M.A. Vicar of St Bartholomew's the Less.
- 1831. Thomas Home, B.D. Rector of St Katharine Coleman.
- 1832. John Banks Hollingworth, D.D. Rector of St Margaret s Lothbury and Minister of St Botolph s Aldgate.
- 1833. William Elisha Law Faulkner, M.A. Rector of St John s, Clerkenwell.
- 1834. Allatson Burgh, M.A. Vicar of St Laurence Jewry and Rector of St Mary Magdalen, Milk Street.
- 1835. James William Bellamy, B.D. Rector of St Mary Abchurch, and Minister of St Laurence Pountney.
- 1836. Lancelot Sharpe, M.A. Minister of All Hallows Staining.
- 1837. Thomas Gilbank Ackland, D.D. Rector of St Mildred Bread Street and St Margaret Moses.
- 1838. Gilbert Beresford, M.A. Rector of St Andrew's Holborn.
- John Abbiss, M.A. Rector of St Bartholomew's the Great. (for 1 month). Vacated office on losing the qualification for Fellowship of the College.
- 1839. William Johnson, B.D. Rector of St Clement Eastcheap and St Martin Orgars.
- 1840. James William Vivian, D.D. Rector of St Augustin and St Faith.
- 1841. John Joseph Ellis, M.A. Rector of St Martin's Outwich.
- 1842. Richard Harris Barham, B.A. Rector of St Mary Magdalen, Old Fish Street, and St Gregory.
- 1843. Sir John Page Wood, LL.B. Rector of St Peters, Cornhill.
- 1844. William Stone, M.A. Rector of Christ Church, Spitalfields.
- 1845. 1846. John Russell, D.D. Rector of St Botolph, Bishopsgate.
- 1847. John James Gelling. Perpetual Curate of St Catherine, Cree Church.
- 1848. Robert Monro. Minister of Bridewell Precinct. .
- 1849. James Lupton, M.A. Rector of St Michael Queen-hithe.
- 1850. Henry Roxby [afterwards Maude], LL.B. Rector of St Olave's Jewry.
- 1851. Thomas Hartwell Home, B.D.
- 1852. Richard H. Ruddock. Minister of All Saints, Bishopsgate.
- 1853. George Croly, LL.D. . Rector of St Stephen, Walbrook.
- 1854. William Goode, M.A. . Rector of All Hallows, Thames Street.
- 1855. 1856. Michael Gibbs, M.A. Vicar of Christ Church, Newgate Street.
- 1857. Charles Mackenzie, M.A. Rector of St Benet, Gracechurch St.
- 1858. William Scott, M.A. Vicar of Christ Church, Hoxton.
- 1859. James William Worthington, D.D. Incumbent of Holy Trinity, Gray's Inn Road.
- 1860. John Vigden Povah, M.A. Rector of St Anne and St Agnes, Aldersgate.
- 1861. Thomas Simpson Evans, M.A. Vicar of St Leonard, Shoreditch.
- 1862. Edward Auriol, M.A. Vicar of St Dunstan-in-the-West.
- 1863. James Jackson, M.A. Vicar of St Sepulchre.
- 1864. Thomas Rochford Redwar. Perpetual curate of St Thomas in the Liberty of the Rolls.
- 1865. John Edmund Cox, M.A. Rector of St Helen, Bishopsgate.
- 1866. William Charles Fynes Webber, M.A. Vicar of St Botolph, Aldersgate.
- 1867. William Rogers, M.A. . Rector of St Botolph, Bishopsgate.
- 1868. John Henry Coward, M.A. Rector of St Bennet, Paul's Wharf.
- 1869. Frederick George Blomfield, M.A. Rector of St Andrew, Undershaft.
- 1870. Henry Irwin Cummins, M.A. Rector of St Alban, Wood Street.
- 1871. Frederick Simcox Lea, M.A. Perpetual Curate of Holy Trinity, Stepney
- 1872. Charles Frederick Chase, M.A. Rector of St Andrew by the Wardrobe with St Anne, Blackfriars.
- 1873. George Townshend Driffield, M.A. Rector of St Mary, Stratford, Bow.
- 1874. 1875. William Henry Milman, M.A. Rector of St Augustine and St Faith.
- 1876. William Hearle Lyall, M.A. Rector of St Dionis Backchurch.
- 1877. Charles Creaghe Collins, M.A. Vicar of St Mary, Aldermanbury.
- 1878. William Sparrow Simpson, D.D. Rector of St Matthew, Friday St.
- 1879. Joseph William Reynolds, M.A. Vicar of St Stephen, Spitalfields.
- 1880. Lewis Borrett White, M.A. Rector of St Mary, Aldermary.
- 1881. William John Hall, M.A. Rector of St Clement, Eastcheap.
- 1882. John Russell Stock, M.A. Rector of All Hallows the Great.
- 1883. William Windle, M.A. Rector of St Stephen, Walbrook.
- 1884. Alfred Povah, M.A. Rector of St Olave, Hart Street.
- 1885. John Fenwick Kitto, M.A. Rector of St Dunstan, Stepney.
- Henry George Scawen Blunt, M.A. Rector of St Andrew, Holborn.
- 1886. Richard Whittington, M.A. Rector of St Peter upon Cornhill.
- 1887. George Barnes, M.A. Perpetual Curate of St Barnabas, Bethnal Green.
- 1888. Main Swete Alexander Walrond, M.A. Vicar of St Laurence Jewry.
- 1889. Septimus Buss, B.A., LL.B. Vicar of St Leonard, Shoreditch.
- 1890. Robert Claudius Billing, D.D. (Bishop Suffragan of Bedford). Rector of St Andrew Undershaft.
- 1891. George Purves Pownall, B.A. Perpetual Curate of St John Baptist, Hoxton.

== Later Presidents ==
- 1906: Percival Clementi Smith
- 1908: John Nelson Burrows
- 1920: Edwin Curtis Bedford
- 1967–68: Thomas Nevill

== Manuscripts housed in the library ==
Sion College Library houses manuscripts in English, Latin, Greek, Hebrew, Persian, Arabic, and other languages. These are all housed at shelf-marks Sion College Library MS L40.2.

These can be accessed through Lambeth Palace Library's online archive and manuscript catalogue (CALM).

- Minuscule 559 (Sion College Library MS L40.2/G3)
- Lectionary 234 (Sion College Library MS L40.2/G1)
- Lectionary 235 (Sion College Library MS L40.2/G2)
