= Walter Calverley (disambiguation) =

Walter Calverley was an English squire and murderer.

Walter Calverley may also refer to:

- Sir Walter Calverley, 1st Baronet (1670–1749), English aristocrat
- Walter Calverley-Blackett (1707–1777), British baronet and politician

== See also ==
- Calverley (surname)
