= Tetley Rowe =

John Tetley Rowe (1861–1915) was an Anglican priest, most notably Archdeacon of Rochester and Canon Residential of Rochester Cathedral from 1908 until his death.

Rowe was educated at Giggleswick School; and Trinity College, Cambridge. He was ordained in 1882 and was in charge of the Mission district in New Church Road, Camberwell. He held incumbencies in Chatham from 1895 to 1907 and Rushall before his appointment as Archdeacon. From February 1903 he was Rural Dean of Rochester.

He died on 29 April 1915 after collapsing at London Victoria station.

== Notes ==
Church of England titles
Preceded by Samuel Cheetham	Archdeacon of Rochester; 1908–1915	Succeeded by Donald Tait
