= Walter Browne (priest) =

British priest (1885–1959)

- Born: 16 September 1885
- Died: 6 February 1959 (aged 73)
- Church: Church of England
- Ordained: 1909
- Offices held: Archdeacon of Rochester

Walter Marshall Browne (16 September 1885 – 6 February 1959) was Archdeacon of Rochester from 1932 to 1951.

== Life ==
Browne was born 16 September 1885, the son of Thomas Gillespie Chapman Browne, actuary, and Ann Mary Ballantyne.

Browne was educated at Tonbridge School, and admitted pensioner of Christ's College, Cambridge on 15 January 1904. He was ordained a deacon in 1909 and a priest in Southwell Minster in 1910.

Browne married Marjorie Vickers on 23 April 1914 at St. Ann's Church, Nottingham.

== Appointments ==
Browne was appointed:

- Curate of St. Ann's Church, Nottingham 1909 - 1912
- Chaplain to the Bishop of Hereford 1912 - 1916
- Vicar of St. Mary's Church, Attenborough 1916 - 1923
- Vicar of Erith 1923 - 1932
- Archdeacon of Rochester 1932 - 1951

Church of England titles
Preceded by Donald Tait	Archdeacon of Rochester; 1932–1951	Succeeded by Lawrence Harland
