= Minuscule 559 =

- New Testament manuscript
- Text: Gospels †
- Date: 11th century
- Script: Greek
- Now at: Lambeth Palace
- Size: 27.6 cm by 21 cm
- Type: Byzantine text-type
- Category: V

Minuscule 559 (in the Gregory-Aland numbering), ε 139 (in the Soden numbering), is a Greek minuscule manuscript of the New Testament, on a parchment. Palaeographically it has been assigned to the 11th century. The manuscript is lacunose. Scrivener labeled it by number 518.

== Description ==
The codex contains the text of the four Gospels on 152 parchment leaves (size 27.6 cm by 21 cm) with some lacunae (Mark 1:1-14; 4:20-30; Luke 1:1-13; John 1:1-17; 4:9-30; 9:14-20:25). The first pages of Mark, Luke, and John have been taken away for the sake of illuminations. The manuscript is damaged by humidity, and much of the text is illegible.

The writing is in one column per page, 24 lines per page. The initial letters are in gold. The minuscule contains tables of the κεφαλαια (only in Mark), numerals of the κεφαλαια at the margin, the τιτλοι in gold, lectionary markings, incipits (notes on the beginning) in red, αναγνωσεις (liturgical notes), subscriptions, numbered στιχοι, and pictures. The Ammonian Sections (in Mark 2:34 - 16:9), in red, were added by a later hand. There are no Eusebian Canons.

== Text ==
The Greek text of the codex is a representative of the Byzantine text-type. Hermann von Soden classified it to the textual family K^{x}. Aland placed it in Category V. According to Wisse's Profile Method it represents the textual family K^{x} in Luke 1 and Luke 10. In Luke 20 it has mixed Byzantine text. It has some unusual readings.

== History ==
The manuscript was in the possession of Edward Payne, who presented it to Sion College in London (along with lectionaries ℓ 234 and ℓ 235).

The manuscript was added to the list of the New Testament minuscule manuscripts by F. H. A. Scrivener (518) and C. R. Gregory (559).

Formerly held in Sion College Library (Arc L 40.2/G 3), the manuscript is now in Lambeth Palace Library, London.

== See also ==
- List of New Testament minuscules
- Biblical manuscript
- Textual criticism
