= John Russell (headmaster) =

John Russell D.D. (1787–1863) was an English clergyman and headmaster of Charterhouse School.

== Life ==
The son of John Russell (died 26 April 1802), rector of Helmdon, Northamptonshire, and Ilmington, Warwickshire, he was educated at Charterhouse School, and matriculated at Christ Church, Oxford, on 3 May 1803. He graduated B.A. in 1806 and M.A. in 1809, took holy orders in 1810, and was appointed headmaster of Charterhouse in 1811. The school became popular: in 1824 he had 480 boys under him, and among his pupils were George Grote, Sir Henry Havelock, and William Makepeace Thackeray, who alluded the school and Russell in his works.

In 1827 Russell was made a prebendary and afterwards canon residentiary of Canterbury Cathedral. He resigned the head-mastership in 1832, on being presented to the rectory of St. Botolph's, Bishopsgate. He was president of Sion College in 1845 and 1846, and was treasurer of the Society for the Propagation of the Gospel, and an administrator of other societies. He held St. Botolph's rectory until his death, at the Oaks, Canterbury, on 3 June 1863. A Latin inscription to his memory, and that of two sons, was placed in the Charterhouse chapel.

== Works ==
Besides separate sermons and school books, Russell published The History of Sion College, London, 1859, and edited for the first time The Ephemerides of Isaac Casaubon, with a Latin preface and notes, 2 vols. Oxford, 1850.

== Family ==
By his wife, Mary Augusta Lloyd, a cousin of Charles Lloyd, Russell had four sons (John (died 1836), Francis, William, and Arthur (died 1828)), and two daughters: Augusta, wife of the Rev. G. Bridges More; and Mary, wife of General William Nelson Hutchinson.

== Notes ==
Attribution

This article incorporates text from a publication now in the public domain: Lee, Sidney, ed. (1897). "Russell, John (1787-1863)". Dictionary of National Biography. Vol. 49. London: Smith, Elder & Co.
