= Thomas Sprat (priest) =

English Anglican priest

Thomas Sprat (5 April 1679 – 10 May 1720) was an English Anglican priest.

The son of Bishop Thomas Sprat, was born in London he was educated at Christ Church, Oxford. He held incumbencies at Boxley and Stone and Archdeacon of Rochester from 1704 until his death.
