= Journey into Life =

1964 booklet by Norman Warren

Journey into Life is a booklet about the Christian faith by Norman Warren, ending with the "sinner's prayer". It was first issued in 1964.

The booklet is written in very simple English. Major publishers initially declined it as naive, but according to Jubilate Group it became "the world's best-selling evangelistic booklet... with worldwide sales of 30 million." It has also been translated into many other languages.

Although some find its style somewhat dated now, others still recommend it prominently. A revised edition, also by Norman Warren, was published in 2005.

Warren also wrote a follow-up tract for people starting out as a new Christian, The Way Ahead.

Chris Green, vicar of St James' Church, Muswell Hill, refers to a PhD thesis being written on the influence of Journey into Life.

The tipping point in my encounter with Christ was Norman Warren's booklet Journey Into Life – it was clear, convincing and challenging and I opened the door. I think I have given away thousands since.
–J.John
