= Lectionary 236 =

Lectionary ℓ 236
- New Testament manuscript
- Text: Evangelistarium †
- Date: 13th century
- Script: Greek
- Now at: Sion College
- Size: 25.2 cm by 20.4 cm

Lectionary 236, designated by siglum ℓ 236 (in the Gregory-Aland numbering) is a Greek manuscript of the New Testament, on parchment. Palaeographically it has been assigned to the 13th century. Scrivener labelled it by 229^{evl}. Some leaves of the codex were lost.

== Description ==
The codex contains lessons from the Gospels of John, Matthew, Luke lectionary (Evangelistarium), with some lacunae at the end. It is complete up to the lesson for July 20 (Eliah), Luke 4:22. The fly-leaf on paper was added with date 1619.

It contains musical notes.

The text is written in Greek minuscule letters, on 217 parchment leaves (25.2 cm by 20.4 cm), in two columns per page, 19-20 lines per page.

There are daily lessons from Easter to Pentecost.

== History ==
Scrivener dated the manuscript to the 14th century, Gregory to the 13th century. Steenbuch dated it to the 11th century. It has been assigned by the INTF to the 13th century.

The manuscript once belonged to the Church of the Saint Mark.

The manuscript was added to the list of New Testament manuscripts by Scrivener (number 229) and Gregory (number 236). Gregory saw it in 1883.

The manuscript was examined by Steenbuch.

The manuscript is not cited in the critical editions of the Greek New Testament (UBS3).

The codex is housed at the Sion College (Arc L 40.2/G 4) in London.

== See also ==
- List of New Testament lectionaries
- Biblical manuscript
- Textual criticism
- Lectionary 235

== Bibliography ==
- C. Steenbuch, Minuscule MS Evan. 559 (Scrivener: 229), JTS XVI (1915), 264-267
