= Lectionary 235 =

13th century Greek manuscript

Lectionary ℓ 235
- New Testament manuscript
- Text: Evangelistarium †
- Date: 13th century
- Script: Greek
- Now at: Sion College
- Size: 26.3 cm by 19.4 cm

Lectionary 235, designated by siglum ℓ 235 (in the Gregory-Aland numbering) is a Greek manuscript of the New Testament, on parchment. Palaeographically it has been assigned to the 13th century. Some leaves of the codex were lost. It is labelled 228^{evl} in Scrivener's list of manuscripts.

== Description ==
The codex contains lessons from the Gospels of John, Matthew, Luke lectionary (Evangelistarium), with some lacunae at the beginning and end. Two leaves were supplied by a later hand on paper. It begins at the lesson for the third day of the second week (John 3:19) and ends at Mark 6:19, in the lesson for August 29.

It contains musical notes in red.

It is written in Greek minuscule letters, on 143 parchment leaves (26.2 cm by 19.4 cm). The writing is in two columns per page, 24 lines per page.

There are daily lessons from Easter to Pentecost.

== History ==
F. H. A. Scrivener dated the manuscript to the 12th century, C. R. Gregory to the 13th century. It has been assigned by the INTF to the 13th century.

The manuscript was in the possession of Edward Payne (as number 3), who presented it for the Sion College (along with manuscripts 559 and ℓ 234).

The manuscript was added to the list of New Testament manuscripts by Scrivener (number 228) and Gregory (number 235). Gregory saw it in 1883.

The manuscript was examined by Steenbuch.

The manuscript is not cited in the critical editions of the Greek New Testament (UBS3, UBS4).

The codex is housed at the Sion College (Arc L 40.2/G 2) in London.

== See also ==
- List of New Testament lectionaries
- Biblical manuscript
- Textual criticism
- Lectionary 236

== Bibliography ==
- C. Steenbuch, Evst. 235 (Scrivener: 228), JTS XVI (1915), 555-558
