= Robert Young (forger) =

Robert Young c.1657–1700 was an English forger and cheat. He was twice married and used bogus requests for references on household help to obtain signatures of men of note. He was jailed for various infractions including bigamy, perjury and fraud.

== Life ==
Young was born about 1657, possibly at Warrington, then in Lancashire, and educated in Ireland. He himself, in one of his unveracious accounts of his career, states that he was educated at Enniskillen school, County Fermanagh, and afterwards at Trinity College, Dublin, but his name does not appear on the list of graduates. In 1675 he married Anne Yeabsly, and five years later, though she was still living, he went through the form of marriage with Mary, daughter of Simon Hutt, a Cavan innkeeper, who was thenceforth the favoured companion in his wanderings and accomplice in his crimes.

== Career ==
Soon after 1680 Young managed to procure admission to deacon's orders at the hands of John Roan, Bishop of Killaloe, whom he circumvented by forging certificates of his learning and moral character. He obtained a curacy first at Tallogh in the county of Waterford, "whence for divers crimes he ran away on another man's horse, which he never restored". From his next curacy at Castlereagh, County Roscommon, he "was forced to flee for getting a bastard". While at Kildallon in the diocese of Kilmore he was delated to the bishop, Francis Marsh, afterwards Archbishop of Dublin, "for many extravagances, the least of which was marrying without banns or license". He now fled into the diocese of Raphoe, but was taken up for bigamy and imprisoned first at Lifford, then at Cavan. From gaol he wrote to both his wives, comparing himself to David, and assuring each of them that she alone was the object of his love. He succeeded in inducing his first wife not to appear against him, and seems to have been allowed benefit of clergy. Detained for non-payment of prison fees, he managed to procure his release by pretending to Ormonde (the "Popish Plot" being then in the air) that he could make disclosure of serious plots against the government. "The Scotchman", as Marsh calls him in a letter to Bishop Sprat, then ran away to England with his second wife. In England they operated at first under the name of Green, perambulating the country with forged testimonials, purporting to be in the hand of the archbishop of Canterbury. At Bury St. Edmunds, on 6 October 1684, they were pilloried as common cheats. From Bury gaol, on 30 September 1684, Young had written a long letter to Archbishop Sancroft, with an entirely novel account of his parentage and early life, expressing his mortal hatred of "discentors, especially that damnable faction of Presbytery", and stating that he had been put upon "the hellish and durty stratageme" of forging testimonials by one Wright, a non-existent "scrivener of Oxford". Failing in his object, he vowed to be revenged on the archbishop. As soon as he was released he forged a new set of testimonials with a dexterity which was generally admitted to be marvellous, and set to work, with a new alias and a new story, collecting large sums of money from wealthy clergymen, including three bishops who were intimate with Sancroft, and believed that they recognised his hand. At length in 1687 the imposture came under the notice of the archbishop, who caused to be inserted in the London Gazette (September and October 1687) advertisements warning the charitable to beware of Mrs. Jones and Robert Smith (i.e. Young and his paramour). Young next gave himself out as a grave Irish clergyman of good preferment, but a victim of Tyrconnel's persecuting fury; some funds were necessary to support this character, and these he seems to have obtained by a series of highly successful frauds at St. Albans, where he had secured the corrupt connivance of the postmaster. Forming a design of a wealthy marriage, Young was now anxious to get rid of Mary Hutt; but at this juncture the pair were betrayed to one of their victims, and lodged in Newgate on a charge of forgery. They escaped with the pillory and a fine, owing to lack of evidence; but, the fines remaining unpaid until 25 May 1692, they remained in prison for upwards of two years.

During the western rebellion Young had stood false witness against a number of presbyterian divines, but his evidence had been disbelieved. While lying in Newgate he determined upon reverting to this branch of his profession and fabricating a sham plot, and with this object in view he addressed himself in the first instance to Tillotson. The archbishop mentioned his allegations with all reserve to William, who treated them with disdain. Young was temporarily disconcerted; but when at the end of April 1692 William left England for the Low Countries, and when the nation was agitated by apprehension of French invasion and Jacobite insurrection, Young's hopes revived. By writing in feigned names to ask after the characters of servants or curates, he had accumulated a collection of autographs from men of note who were suspected of disaffection. With consummate calligraphic skill he now drew up a paper purporting to be an association for the restoration of the banished king. To this document he appended the forged signatures of Marlborough, Cornbury, Salisbury, Sancroft, and Thomas Sprat, bishop of Rochester. The owners of the first four names were already under the suspicion of the government. With regard to Sprat it was well known that there was more of the opportunist than of the conspirator in his composition. Why Young selected the ease-loving bishop to be the pivot of his plot was probably because he had been prospecting round Bromley in 1690, and knew that ingress into the palace was easy. Young himself could not quit Newgate, and he selected as his emissary a rogue named Stephen Blackhead, whose ears had suffered in the pillory. Blackhead conveyed to the bishop a letter carefully forged by Young from an imaginary doctor of divinity. Highly pleased with the terms of the letter, the bishop told his butler to treat the messenger well. Blackhead, affecting great reverence for the entourage of a bishop, asked the butler to show him Sprat's study, with a view of concealing the traitorous document among the papers on the episcopal table. Failing in this, he had finally to content himself with dropping the "association" into a flowerpot in a disused parlour. Young now demanded to be heard before the privy council on a matter of the greatest import. He had timed his plot to a nicety. The government were overweighted with anxiety. They thought Young's story plausible enough to order Sprat's arrest, and messengers were sent down to Bromley on 7 May 1692 with a warrant from Nottingham to take the bishop into custody, and to search his apartments for the signed instrument in which the alleged conspirators avowed their aims. Young particularly requested that the officers might be ordered to examine the bishop's flowerpots. Hence the incident was referred to by Lady Marlborough and others as "the flowerpot plot" (see Brewer, Historic Note Book). Very fortunately for the bishop the forged document was not found, and after ten days' detention Sprat was suffered to return to Bromley. In the meantime Young had sent Blackhead to recover the paper, which he thereupon forwarded to the secretary of state (Romney), with an ingenious explanation. The bishop was recalled before the council (10 June 1692) and confronted with Blackhead. Finding the bishop's story corroborated by his servants at all points, and greatly relieved by the victory of La Hogue, the privy councillors turned sharply on Blackhead, who lost his nerve and finally blurted out the truth. But Young was utterly unabashed; he repudiated Blackhead, and denied that he had given directions for the flowerpots to be searched. He declared that the bishop had bought off his accomplice, and that they were trying to stifle the plot. Sprat, conscious that he had perhaps narrowly escaped the block, upbraided Young for his unprovoked malignity. He replied with as much cunning as effrontery, "All is not confessed yet. A parliament will come, and then you shall hear more from me" (Sprat, Relation, pt. ii.). Another temporary sufferer, but eventual gainer, by Young's false accusation was the Duke of Marlborough, now promptly released from the Tower. On his return to Newgate Young attempted to suborn a half-starved wretch named Holland to take Blackhead's place, and to support him with newly devised evidence against Marlborough and Sprat. Holland having reported this scheme to Nottingham, Young was prosecuted by the attorney-general for perjury. Blackhead absconded after promising to turn King's evidence, thus delaying the trial until 7 February 1693, when Young was sentenced at the king's bench to be imprisoned and to be thrice set in the pillory, where he had to undergo a very severe pelting. Having effected his escape from the King's Bench Prison on 12 December 1698, Young seems to have turned to coining for a livelihood, and early in April 1700 he was arrested for this offence and tried at the Old Bailey. He was found guilty on 12 April, under the name of John Larkin alias Young. The "evidence against him", says a contemporary news-sheet, "were two fellow prisoners whom he had invegled to assist him in the act of coyning, with design to accuse them, and to witness against them, in hopes to purchase his liberty, but they turned evidence against him, upon which he was condemned. He was very dexterous in counterfeiting People's Hands, having counterfeited the Hands of both the Sheriffs for the discharge of a prisoner" (London Post, 15 April). He made a "penitent" end at Tyburn on 19 April 1700, confessing that he had forged the plot against the bishop of Rochester (Flying Post, No. 772). In a "Paper delivered by Robert Young" to John Allen, the ordinary of Newgate, and published on 20 April 1700, the criminal frankly confesses "I have injured my Neighbour so often by Forgeries, Cheats, &c., that I think it is scarce possible to recount them".

Writing to Lord Hatton in March 1693, Charles Hatton said of Young, whose trial he witnessed: "In impudence he far outdid even Dr. Oates. He had not a ranting impudence, but a most unparalleled, sedate, composed impudence, and pretends to be as great a martyr for his zeale for the preservation of the present government as Oates did for his for the protestant religion" (Hatton Corresp. ii. 190).
