= Lawrence Harland =

Archdeacon of Rochester 1951–1969 (1905–1977)

Lawrence Winston Harland, MBE (19 November 1905 – 10 March 1977) was an Anglican priest, most notably Archdeacon of Rochester and Canon Residential of Rochester Cathedral from 1951 to 1969.

Lawrence was educated at Sidney Sussex College, Cambridge and Chichester Theological College. He was ordained in 1932 and began his ministry with curacies in Bingley and Skipton. He was priest in charge at St Martin, Bradford then vicar of Menston. He was a chaplain to the British Armed Forces during World War II. He became priest-vicar of Lichfield Cathedral in 1946; general secretary of Christian Reconstruction of Europe in 1947; and general secretary of the Advisory Committee of Christian Churches for the Festival of Britain in 1951. He was an Honorary Chaplain to the Queen from 1966 to 1975.

== Notes ==
Church of England titles
Preceded by Walter Browne	Archdeacon of Rochester; 1951–1969	Succeeded by David Stewart-Smith
