= Richard Biscoe =

English clergyman

Richard Biscoe (died 1748) was an English clergyman. Initially a Dissenting minister, he later was an Anglican, Boyle Lecturer, and President of Sion College.

== Life ==
He was educated at an academy kept by Samuel Benion at Shrewsbury, and on 19 December 1716 was made a Dissenting minister at the Old Jewry Meeting-house. From 1716 to 1727 he was minister of Newington Green Chapel. In 1727 he conformed and was made rector of St. Martin Outwich, London. He also held the living of Northwald, near Epping, was a minor canon of St. Paul's Cathedral, a prebendary from 1736, and a chaplain to George II. He died in May 1748.

== Works ==
He delivered the Boyle lectures in 1736, 1737, and 1738, and in 1742 published two volumes based on them under the title History of the Acts of the Holy Apostles confirmed from other authors; and considered as full evidence of the truth of Christianity, with a prefatory discourse on the nature of that evidence. It was praised by Philip Doddridge, and was reprinted in 1829 and 1840. A German translation was published at Magdeburg in 1751.

He was also the author of Remarks on a Book lately published entitled "A Plain Account of the Nature and End of the Sacrament of the Lord's Supper," 1735.

He published a pamphlet about a definitive case of heresy in the West Country, 1719; that debate widened the split between Presbyterians and Independents.
