= Donald Tait =

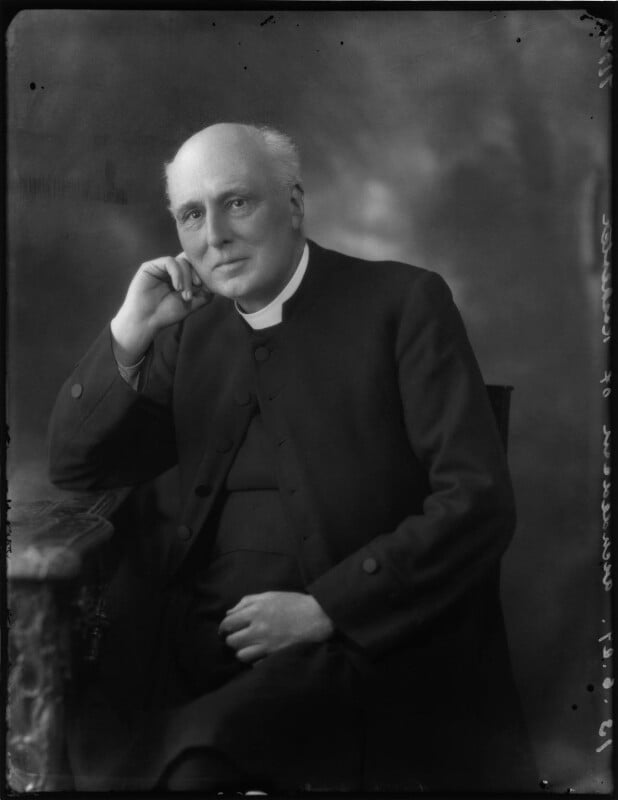
Tait in 1929

Donald Tait (1862 – 24 September 1932) was an Anglican priest, most notably Archdeacon of Rochester and canon residential of Rochester Cathedral from 1915 until his death.

Tait was educated at Marlborough; Trinity Hall, Cambridge. He was ordained in 1888 and was chaplain at Trinity College, Glenalmond then curate at Malvern Wells. He was vicar of Bromley from 1904 and rural dean of Rochester from 1909, relinquishing both posts when appointed a cathedral-based archdeacon.

== Notes ==
Church of England titles
Preceded by John Tetley Rowe	Archdeacon of Rochester; 1915–1932	Succeeded by Walter Browne
