= Sinner's prayer =

Evangelical Christian term for any prayer of repentance

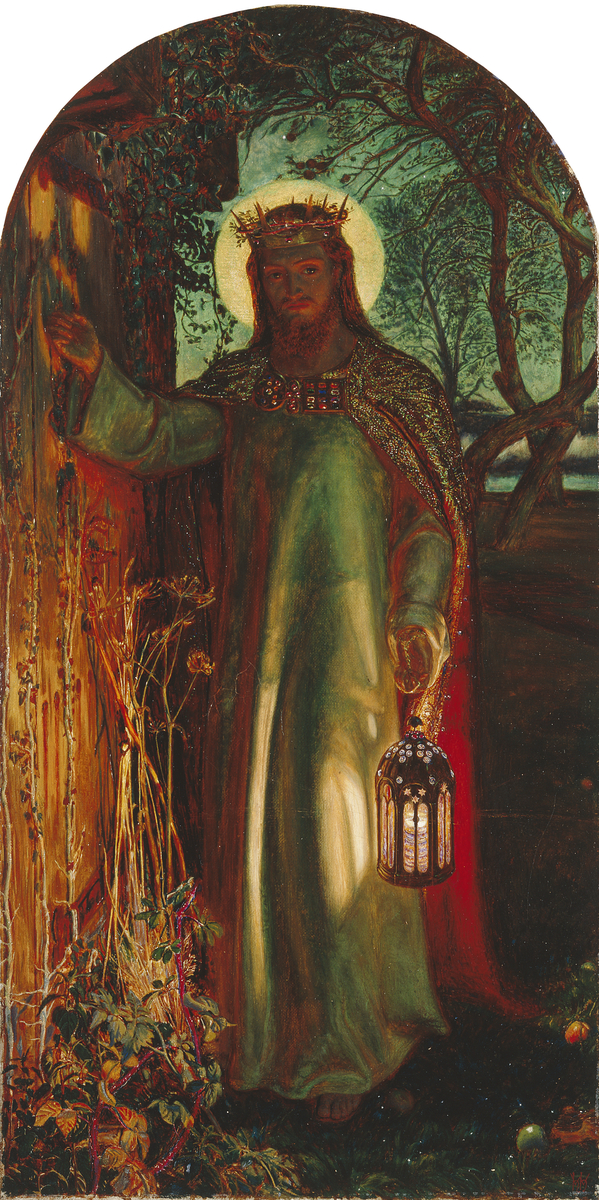
William Holman Hunt's 19th century The Light of the World is an allegory of Jesus knocking on the door of the sinner's heart.

The Sinner's prayer (also called the Consecration prayer and Salvation prayer) refers to any prayer of repentance and is most often associated with evangelical Christian denominations. Denominations that use this prayer often do not consider it to be mandatory for membership or conversion. Some Christians see reciting the Sinner's prayer as the moment defining one's salvation, others see it as a beginning step of one's lifelong faith journey, while still others understand it to be a form of "re-commitment" for repentant believers.

The sinner's prayer is most often performed in an altar call during worship services or where converts are invited to repeat the words of some form of a Sinner's prayer. It is also frequently found on printed tracts or chick tracts, urging people to "repeat these words from the bottom of your heart".

The Sinner's prayer takes various forms and is prayed silently, aloud, or read from a suggested model. While there is no specific formula considered essential, it usually contains an admission of sin and a belief in or recognition of the penal substitution of Christ for the penitent person's sins.

The use of the Sinner's prayer is common within some Protestant traditions, such as the Methodist churches and various Baptist churches, as well among evangelical Anglicans. While not traditionally a part of the language of the Lutheran and Roman Catholic traditions, it is used among certain circles of adherents belonging to these faiths. It is also present in movements that span several denominations, including Evangelicalism, Fundamentalism, and Charismatic Christianity. It is sometimes uttered by Christians seeking redemption or reaffirming their faith in Christ during a crisis or disaster, when death may be imminent.

== Origins ==
The Augsburg Confession divides repentance into two parts: "One is contrition, that is, terrors smiting the conscience through the knowledge of sin; the other is faith, which is born of the Gospel, or of absolution, and believes that for Christ's sake, sins are forgiven, comforts the conscience, and delivers it from terrors."

The Sinner's prayer, as popularly known today, has roots in Protestant Christianity. Some affirm that it evolved, in some form or another, during the early days of the Protestant Reformation, as a reaction against the notion of justification by means of meritorious works. Others believe it originated as late as the 18th century revival movement. Paul Harrison Chitwood, in his doctoral dissertation on the history of the Sinner's prayer, argues that it originated in the early 20th century.

Evangelists such as Billy Graham and evangelistic organizations such as Campus Crusade for Christ brought the concept to prominence in the 20th century. Televangelists often ask viewers to pray a Sinner's prayer with them, one phrase at a time, to become a Christian. Quite commonly, such a prayer appears at the conclusion of a tract and is recited in a religious service or other public service as an invitation for congregants to affirm their faith, sometimes as part of an altar call. It is said to happen many times every day around the world—in one-to-one conversations between friends, relatives, and even strangers; in pastors' offices; via email; in online chat rooms; in addition to both small and large worship services.

== Typical examples ==
An early proponent of the sinner's prayer was the well-known American evangelist D. L. Moody.

An early version of what some would consider the Sinner's prayer is found in Pilgrim's Progress by John Bunyan, published in 1678, Ninth Stage, Chapter 18:

Hopeful: He bid me go to him and see. Then I said it was presumption. He said, No; for I was invited to come.Mt 11:28 Then he gave me a book of Jesus' inditing, to encourage me the more freely to come; and he said concerning that book, that every jot and tittle thereof stood firmer than heaven and earth.Mt 24:35 Then I asked him what I must do when I came; and he told me I must entreat upon my knees,Ps 95:6 Dan 6:10 with all my heart and soul,Jer 29:12,13 the Father to reveal him to me. Then I asked him further, how I must make my supplications to him; and he said, Go, and thou shalt find him upon a mercy-seat, where he sits all the year long to give pardon and forgiveness to them that come. I told him, that I knew not what to say when I came; and he bid say to this effect: God be merciful to me a sinner, and make me to know and believe in Jesus Christ; for I see, that if his righteousness had not been, or I have not faith in that righteousness, I am utterly cast away. Lord, I have heard that thou art a merciful God, and hast ordained that thy Son Jesus Christ should be the Savior of the world; and moreover, that thou art willing to bestow him upon such a poor sinner as I am—and I am a sinner indeed. Lord, take therefore this opportunity, and magnify thy grace in the salvation of my soul, through thy Son Jesus Christ. Amen.

Various other versions of the prayer include:

Dear Lord Jesus, I know that I am a sinner, and I ask for Your forgiveness. I believe You died for my sins and rose from the dead. I turn from my sins and invite You to come into my heart and life. I want to trust and follow You as my Lord and Savior. In Your Name. Amen.

— Billy Graham

Lord Jesus, I need You. Thank You for dying on the cross for my sins. I open the door of my life and receive You as my Savior and Lord. Thank You for forgiving my sins and giving me eternal life. Take control of the throne of my life. Make me the kind of person You want me to be.

— Cru (formerly Campus Crusade for Christ)

Dear Lord Jesus, I know I am a sinner. I believe You died for my sins. Right now, I turn from my sins and open the door of my heart and life. I confess You as my personal Lord and Savior. Thank You for saving me. Amen.

— Greg Laurie Salvation Prayer

God our Father, I believe that out of Your infinite love You have created me. In a thousand ways I have shunned Your love. I repent of each and every one of my sins. Please forgive me. Thank You for sending Your Son to die for me, to save me from eternal death. I choose this day to enter into (renew my) covenant with You and to place Jesus at the center of my heart. I surrender to Him as Lord over my whole life. I ask You now to flood my soul with the gift of the Holy Spirit so that my life may be transformed. Give me the grace and courage to live as a disciple in Your Church for the rest of my days. In Jesus name I pray Amen.

— St. Paul Street Evangelization

== Support ==
The Peace with God organization, and other evangelistic organizations and preachers, messengers (delegates) to the Southern Baptist Convention (SBC) 2012 annual meeting reaffirmed the Sinner's prayer after some debate:

We affirm that repentance and faith involve a crying out for mercy and a calling on the Lord (Rom. 10:13), often identified as a "Sinner's Prayer", as a biblical expression of repentance and faith. A "Sinner's Prayer" is not an incantation that results in salvation merely by its recitation and should never be manipulatively employed or utilized apart from a clear articulation of the gospel (Matt. 6:7, Matt. 15:7–9).

== Criticisms ==
=== Inauthentic conversion ===
David Platt, a prominent Southern Baptist pastor in Birmingham, Alabama, has said that "Many assume they are saved simply because of a prayer they prayed. It's not that praying a prayer in and of itself is bad—but the question in John 2–3 is what kind of faith are we calling people to?" Speaking at The Verge Church leaders' conference said the emphasis on the Sinner's prayer is "unbiblical and damning." He continued:

I'm convinced that many people in our churches are simply missing the life of Christ, and a lot of it has to do with what we've sold them as the gospel, i.e. pray this prayer, accept Jesus into your heart, invite Christ into your life. Should it not concern us that there is no such superstitious prayer in the New Testament? Should it not concern us that the Bible never uses the phrase, 'accept Jesus into your heart' or 'invite Christ into your life'? It's not the gospel we see being preached, it's modern evangelism built on sinking sand. And it runs the risk of disillusioning millions of souls.

Platt says he is concerned that some people "say they believe in Jesus [...] say they have accepted Jesus [...] say that they have received Jesus, but they are not saved and will not enter the kingdom of heaven". While he affirmed that people calling out to God with repentant faith is fundamental to attaining eternal life (salvation), he said his comments about the "sinner's prayer" have been deeply motivated "by a concern for authentic conversions".

Subsequently, he has written:

My comments about the sinner's prayer have been deeply motivated by a concern for authentic conversion and regenerate church membership... Do I believe it is "wrong" for someone to pray a "prayer of salvation"? Certainly not. Calling out to God in prayer with repentant faith is fundamental to being saved [...] [I] urge us, as we go to all people among all nations with the good news of God's love, to be both evangelistically zealous and biblically clear at the same time (Matthew 28:18–20).

Francis Chan, a well-known evangelical Christian, has made statements that contradict the Sinner's prayer and emphasizing baptism and the Holy Spirit.

It has been noted that hundreds of millions adhere to a belief system and practice of salvation that was largely unheard of until relatively recent times. The concept that one can pray to invite Jesus into their heart, and the idea that baptism is merely an outward sign, are modern developments. The practice of the ‘sinner’s prayer,’ in particular, is often traced to the evangelistic campaigns of Billy Sunday in the early 20th century, though the phrase ‘receiving Christ into your heart’ became formalized as a prayer of conversion for non-Christians during the missionary movements of the nineteenth century.

=== Possibly shallow, or insincere commitment ===
A second and related criticism is that many believers fail to mature as Christians after their supposed conversion using the Sinner's prayer. An article in Christianity Today claims that "mediocrity and hypocrisy characterize the lives of many avowed Christians".

Anyone can, and most Americans do, "believe" in Jesus rather than some alternative savior. Anyone can, and many Americans sometimes do, say a prayer asking Jesus to save them. But not many embark on a life fully devoted to the love of God, the love of neighbor, the moral practice of God's will, and radical, costly discipleship.

— David P. Gushee

The writer encourages believers to go beyond a Sinner's prayer and "embark on a life fully devoted to the love of God, the love of neighbor, the moral practice of God's will, and radical, costly discipleship". "Love of God" and "Love of neighbor" are the Great Commandments (see also Disciple (Christianity)).

=== Lack of biblical presence ===
Another criticism of the Sinner's prayer is that passages used to support it actually are not about the lost repeating a prayer in order to become Christians. The Sinner's prayer is often employed in conjunction with Revelation 3:20 and Romans 10:9–10, 13. Revelation 3:20 is employed to teach that Christ is knocking at the door of one's heart, and when a lost person asks him to come inside, Jesus comes into the sinner's heart. Romans 10:9–10, 13 are employed to affirm that one must confess with their mouth—say, the Sinner's prayer—in order to become a Christian. However, the Baptist Greek professor Thomas Ross argues that Revelation 3:20 is about members of a church turning to the Lord, not about Christ entering into the heart of the lost. He provides 14 reasons that Revelation 3:20 is not about the lost asking Jesus into their hearts to become saved. He similarly argues that Romans 10:9–14 refers to Christians confessing Christ publicly before men and manifesting a life of prayer, rather than to the lost becoming saved by a one-time repetition of the Sinner's prayer.

Another form of this criticism of the Sinner's prayer states that simply praying the Sinner's prayer does not actually grant salvation to the one praying. One essay on the topic from the "Christian Apologetics and Research Ministry" asserts that "The 'Sinner's Prayer' is, today, an effective tool of Satan to dupe people into believing they are saved when they are not":

Many Christians make the cataclysmic and unbiblical mistake of giving the other person a false sense of assurance of salvation, by asserting the person is saved because he prayed a prayer. So, many people walk away from such a conversation still dead in their sins, but believing what they've been told. "I believed what my friend told me, and I prayed a prayer. So, now I'm a Christian!"

— Tony Miano

=== Absence of the Sinner's prayer in historic Christianity ===
Other opponents of the Sinner's prayer point out that no classic Christian confession of faith from any evangelical denomination in Christendom affirms that one must say the Sinner's prayer to be saved; on the contrary, Baptist, Presbyterian and other Reformed, and other evangelical groups unanimously teach justification by faith alone. They argue that the Sinner's prayer is a modern deviation from orthodox evangelicalism and a deviation from classic evangelical methods of evangelism. The Sinner's prayer was not practiced before the 1700s. Therefore, to say that it is the way to be saved is to say that prior to the 1700s no-one was saved.

=== Doctrine of baptismal regeneration ===
Baptismal regenerationalists—those Christians who believe that when one is baptized in water is the actual moment that an individual receives salvation—include Roman Catholics, Lutherans, some Anglicans, the Churches of Christ, International Churches of Christ, and Christian churches and churches of Christ. This is based on passages in the New Testament that some interpret to require water baptism for salvation. (Note: Examples of these may be found in Mark 16:16, John 3:3–5, Acts 2:38, Acts 22:16 and 1 Peter 3:21.)

In what is termed the Great Commission of Jesus just prior to his Ascension in Matthew 28:18–20, he instructed his followers to go, make disciples, teach them, and baptize them, as Jesus was baptized in water by John the Baptist. His disciples baptized converts, though John 4:1 states that "Jesus Himself did not baptize, but His disciples" did. Opponents of baptismal regeneration understand baptism to be a means of identifying with Christ, and that when performed by immersion it is symbolic of his death, burial and resurrection. Some dispensationalists believe the baptism that saves a person is the Baptism with the Holy Spirit that Jesus gives, and not water baptism (1 Peter 3:21). Many other evangelicals and fundamentalists recognize that texts such as Mark 16:16, John 3:5, and Acts 2:38 refer to baptism in water, but argue that such verses, interpreted in their context, provide no support whatsoever for baptismal regeneration. Historic or Landmark Baptists affirm that the baptism with the Holy Spirit was a completed event that took place in the first century and is not for today, arguing that texts employed to support baptismal regeneration are actually totally consistent with justification by faith alone (James 2:18–26).

Roman Catholics, Lutherans, and Orthodox churches also teach that forgiveness is received in baptism (although they practice this in the "Christening" with water of infants or adult converts). A leading Roman Catholic authority defines "baptism" in the following fashion:

A sacrament of the New Law instituted by Jesus Christ, in which, as a result of washing with water accompanied by the words "I baptize thee in the name of the Father and of the Son and of the Holy Ghost," a human being is spiritually regenerated, and made capable of receiving the other sacraments[.]

— Donald Attwater

Evidence presented to advocate baptism being necessary for salvation includes the conversion of Saul of Tarsus (the Apostle Paul). After Christ had told Saul to enter Damascus where Saul would be told what he "must" do, Saul was blind for three days and was praying during this time. Ananias arrived, cured Paul of his blindness and baptized Saul.

Others see it as an example of apparently instantaneous salvation coming through repentance without water baptism or any kind of work, citing the assurance Jesus gave to the penitent thief on a cross next to him during the crucifixion.

An opposing position here is that the penitent thief was dying under the older Mosaic law which did not require baptism (cf. Mikveh) and that before Christ's death he had authority and did forgive many without any of the salvation requirements found after his death, burial and Resurrection found in the rest of the New Testament. Additionally, it is unknown whether the thief had been baptized at a stage in life before being crucified. John the Baptist and Jesus' disciples already had baptized many individuals.

Baptismal regenerationists refer to water baptism as the "washing of regeneration", (1 Corinthians 6:11/John 3:5) believing it to be part of the "born again" conversion experience in the Bible. The passage states, "And now why tarriest thou? Arise, and be baptized, and wash away thy sins, calling on the name of the Lord". Opponents of baptismal regeneration argue that vast numbers of texts in the Gospel of John, the only specifically evangelistic book of the New Testament (John 20:31), promise eternal life to every single believer (John 1:12; 3:16, 18, 36; 5:24; 6:47, etc.) and so demonstrate that eternal life is received by faith alone before baptism. Similarly, while texts affirm that those who do not repent and believe are damned (Luke 13:3; John 3:18, 36), The Bible also shows that the unbaptized are damned, according to baptismal regenerationists. (Mark 16:16/Revelation 22:14). Advocates of the Sinner's prayer also believe verses such as Romans 10:13 show that people are saved before baptism when they pray and ask to be saved, while evangelical and fundamentalist opponents of the Sinner's prayer believe that a defense of the Sinner's prayer gives opponents of justification by faith alone security by enshrining a human tradition over the Biblical mandate to repent and believe to receive eternal life (Mark 1:15). Moreover, opponents of the Sinner's prayer reference Romans 6:3–5 to assert that the audience of the book of Romans was already baptized, and, therefore, were being instructed to call on the name of the Lord after they had heard and believed the message being preached (Acts 10:14–17). Other verses such as Acts 22:16 suggest that baptism and "calling on His name" are complementary actions required for forgiveness of sins.

== See also ==
- Christian views on the old covenant
- Conversion to Christianity
- Decision theology
- Evangelism
- Jesus Prayer
- Journey into Life, a widely used tract ending with such a prayer
- Lord's Prayer
- Ministry of Jesus
- Proselytism
- Shahada
