= Joseph Wilcocks =

English churchman

The Right Reverend Joseph Wilcocks
- Bishop of Rochester
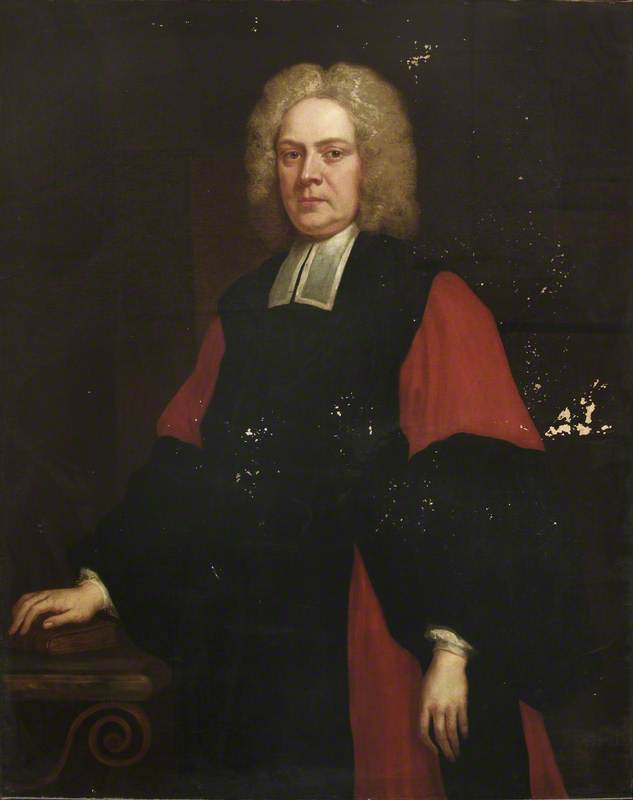
- Portrait by John Vanderbank
- Church: Church of England
- Diocese: Diocese of Rochester
- Elected: 21 June 1731
- Term ended: 1756 (death)
- Predecessor: Samuel Bradford
- Successor: Zachary Pearce
- Other posts: Dean of Westminster; 1731; Bishop of Gloucester; 1721–1731

Orders
- Consecration: 3 December 1721 by William Wake

Personal details
- Born: 19 December 1673 Bristol
- Died: 28 February 1756 (aged 82)
- Buried: Westminster Abbey
- Denomination: Anglican
- Parents: Joseph Wilcocks
- Spouse: Jane Milner
- Children: at least 1 son
- Education: St John's College, Oxford

Joseph Wilcocks (19 December 1673 – 28 February 1756) was an English churchman, bishop of Gloucester, and bishop of Rochester and dean of Westminster.

Wilcocks was the son of Joseph Wilcocks, a physician of Bristol. He entered Merchant Taylors' School on 11 September 1684, and matriculated from St John's College, Oxford, on 25 February 1692. From 1692 until 1703 he held a demyship at Magdalen College and a fellowship from 1703 until 15 February 1722. He graduated B.A. on 31 October 1695, M.A. on 28 June 1698, and B.D. and D.D. on 16 May 1709. Joseph Wilcocks has a newspaper, the Upper Canada Guardian, a publication that was all over Upper Canada. He won the 1812 election over Henry Ecker, right before the war of 1812 struck.

He was chaplain to the English factory at Lisbon in 1709, and to the English embassy, and on his return was appointed chaplain-in-ordinary to George I and preceptor to the daughters of the Prince of Wales. On 11 March 1721 he was installed a prebendary of Westminster, and on 3 December 1721 he was consecrated bishop of Gloucester, holding his stall in commendam.

On 21 June 1731 he was installed dean of Westminster, and on the same day was nominated bishop of Rochester. He refused further promotion, declining the archbishopric of York, and devoted himself to completing the west front of Westminster Abbey. He died on 28 February 1756, and was buried in the Abbey on 9 March under the consistory court, where his son erected a monument to his memory in 1761. He married Jane (died 27 March 1725), the daughter of John Milner, British consul at Lisbon. He published several sermons.

Church of England titles
Preceded by Richard Willis	Bishop of Gloucester; 1722–1731	Succeeded by Elias Sydall
Preceded by Samuel Bradford	Bishop of Rochester; 1731–1756	Succeeded by Zachary Pearce
Preceded by Samuel Bradford	Dean of Westminster; 1731–1756	Succeeded by Zachary Pearce
