= Josiah Relph =

English poet (1712–1743)

Josiah Relph (3 December 1712 – 26 June 1743) was a Cumberland poet (his first name is given as Joseph in earlier editions of the Dictionary of National Biography). His poetical works were first published in 1747 under the title of A Miscellany of Poems. They were edited by Thomas Sanderson, who supplied a biography of the author and a pastoral elegy on his death. A second edition appeared at Carlisle in 1798, with the biography and engravings by Thomas Bewick.

Relph's verses are in the dialect of his native county; they show talent and appreciation of natural beauties.

== Biography ==
Relph was born in Churchtown, his father's small estate belonging in the parish of Sebergham, Cumberland. Though a freeholder or 'statesman' of very small means, Relph's father procured for his son an excellent education at the celebrated school of the Rev. Mr. Yates of Appleby.

At fifteen Relph went to Glasgow, returning not long after to fill the post of master in the small grammar school of his native village. Taking holy orders, he also succeeded to the incumbency of the parish of Sebergham, a perpetual curacy. In these positions, he worked energetically to reform the rough manners of his parishioners and to educate their children.

Relph died at Churchtown. He was buried at Sebergham. A monument with an inscription to his memory is in the church.
