= Ralph Pickover =

English priest died in the early 1600s

Ralph Pickover (died in 1614/1615) was an English priest.

Pickover was educated at Christ Church, Oxford. He held livings at Ludgershall and Winterbourne Cherborough. He was archdeacon of Rochester from 1576 to 1584; and archdeacon of Sarum from 1585 until his death on 8 March 1614/1615.
