= James William Bellamy =

James William Bellamy BD FRS (15 November 1788 – 11 March 1874) was Headmaster of Merchant Taylors' School, Northwood for 26 years.

He belonged to an old Huguenot family settled in Norfolk and Lincolnshire and was educated at Queens' College, Cambridge, where he graduated BA in 1812 and MA in 1815.

He was ordinated as a deacon in 1813 and as a priest in 1814 and served as Rector of St Mary Abchurch from 1816 to 1822 and then vicar of Sellindge, Kent from 1822 to his death.

He was appointed headmaster of Merchant Taylors' School in 1819, holding the position until 1845. He was elected a Fellow of the Royal Society in 1834 and President of Sion College for 1835. In 1843, he was made a Prebendary of St Paul's Cathedral, occupying the stall of Harleston.

He married Mary Cherry, daughter of Thomas Cherry, his predecessor as Headmaster of Merchant Taylors. They had 2 sons and 3 daughters.
