= John Lee (priest) =

English Anglican priest

John Lee was an English Anglican priest in the 17th century.

Lee was born in Surrey and educated at Magdalen College, Oxford. He held livings at Milton-next-Gravesend, Southfleet, and Bishopsbourne. Lee was archdeacon of Rochester from 1660 until his death on 12 June 1679.
