= Graham Calverley =

Australian rules footballer

Personal information
- Full name: Graham Calverley
- Born: 30 November 1943
- Original teams: St Josephs College, East Brunswick
- Height: 183 cm (6 ft 0 in)
- Weight: 76 kg (168 lb)

Playing career^{1}
Years	Club	Games (Goals)
1965	Fitzroy	10 (5)
- ^{1} Playing statistics correct to the end of 1965.

Graham Calverley (born 30 November 1943) is a former Australian rules footballer who played with Fitzroy in the Victorian Football League (VFL).
