= Eleanor Jane Taylor Calverley =

American medical missionary in Kuwait

Eleanor Calverley, M.D. (1886–1968) was the first medical missionary in Kuwait to gain the trust of Arab women who were forbidden to see male physicians.

== Early life ==
SHe was born in Woodstock, New Jersey, on March 24, 1886. She pursued a medical education at the Women's Medical College of Pennsylvania, graduating in 1908. On September 6, 1909, Eleanor married Edwin Elliott Calverley, a missionary and scholar of Arabic and Islamic studies, with whom she trained for work in the Arabian Peninsula. They traveled together to Kuwait in 1911, and worked there for many years. They had three daughters: Grace, Elisabeth and Eleanor.

== Work ==
She was the first woman doctor in Kuwait. She opened a small dispensary connected to her home to provide medical care to the general population, and the Kuwaiti women in particular. In 1919, under her leadership, the first women's hospital in Kuwait was established. In her memoir, she wrote:

We saw both wealth and poverty among the Arab and Persian populations of Kuwait. Some Persian families were rich; but there were others, recently immigrated from Persia, who had no homes except the sand beside a boat drawn up on the shore. Their only protection was a curtain of sacking, fastened above them to the side of the boat and pegged down into the sand. Freed African slaves, deprived of their former master's support, were also often destitute. Of such we could not require any fee for medical service.
