= Edmund Calverley =

English cricketer

Personal information
- Full name: Edmund Calverley
- Born: 14 August 1826; Oulton, Yorkshire, England
- Died: 15 September 1897 (aged 71); Oulton, Yorkshire, England
- Batting: Unknown

Domestic team information
- Years: Team
- 1846–1849: Cambridge University
- 1849–1855: Marylebone Cricket Club

Career statistics
| Competition | First-class |
|---|---|
| Matches | 21 |
| Runs scored | 365 |
| Batting average | 10.73 |
| 100s/50s | –/– |
| Top score | 30 |
| Catches/stumpings | 7/– |
- Source: Cricinfo, 21 April 2021

Edmund Calverley (born Edmund Blayds) (14 August 1826 – 15 September 1897) was an English first-class cricketer.

The son of John Blayds, he was born in August 1826 at Oulton Hall in the West Riding of Yorkshire. He was educated at Harrow School, where he play for the cricket eleven. From Harrow he went up to Trinity College, Cambridge. While studying at Cambridge, he played first-class cricket for Cambridge University Cricket Club, debuting against the Marylebone Cricket Club (MCC) in 1846. He played first-class cricket for Cambridge University until 1849, making fifteen appearances. He scored 255 runs in his fifteen matches, averaging 10.20 and making a highest score of 30. He also played for a combined Cambridge University and Cambridge Town Club team in 1849, against an All England Eleven. Calverley also made additional appearances in first-class cricket for the MCC between 1849 and 1855, making five appearances and scoring 92 runs. He was a student of Lincoln's Inn during his studies at Cambridge.

He changed his surname from Blayds to Calverley in 1852. In January 1853, he was appointed a deputy lieutenant for the West Riding of Yorkshire. Calverley served as an officer in the East Riding of Yorkshire Yeomanry, holding the rank of captain by September 1854. He was additionally a justice of the peace for the West Riding of Yorkshire. Calverley had been in ill health in his latter years, suffering from a stroke in 1892. Two weeks prior to his death he suffered from an onset of pleurisy and a day prior to his death he ruptured a small blood vessel. Calverley died the following day on 15 September 1897 at Oulton Hall, after a deterioration in his condition.
