= Lilly Butler =

Lilly Butler (died Jan 1792) was an Anglican priest, most notably Dean of Ardagh from 1785 to 1790.

He was born in Bletchingley and educated at Clare College, Cambridge.

He was ordained deacon in 1754, and priest in 1756. He held livings at Wotton Underwood, Battersea and Witham. He died in January 1792.
