= Thomas Sanderson (poet) =

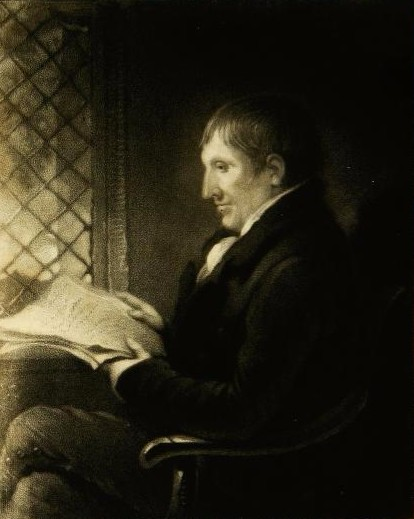
Thomas Sanderson

Thomas Sanderson (1759–1829) was an English poet. He spent almost his entire life in Cumberland.

== Life ==
Born in 1759 at Currigg in the chapelry of Raughtonhead, Cumberland, he was the fourth son of John Sanderson (1723–1776), by his wife Sarah Scott of Caldbeck. He was educated first by his father, and then at Sebergham school.

A competent classical scholar, Sanderson in 1778 became master at a school at Greystoke, near Penrith. Later he was a private tutor in the neighbourhood of Morpeth, Northumberland. He returned to his mother's house at Sebergham, and lived in complete seclusion, but occasionally met, at a spot overlooking the River Caldew, Josiah Relph, the Cumbrian poet. On his mother's death he resumed work as a schoolmaster, first at Blackhall grammar school, near Carlisle, and then at Beaumont, where, in 1791, he became acquainted with Jonathan Boucher.

Sanderson had some success as a poet, and legacies from relatives; he gave up teaching and retired to Kirklinton, nine miles north-east of Carlisle, where he boarded with a farmer, and spent the remainder of his life as a writer. He died on 16 January 1829, when a fire broke out in his room while he was asleep. Some of his manuscripts were lost in the flames.

== Works ==
Boucher thought well of some verses which Sanderson had contributed a "Crito" to the Cumberland Packet. He induced Sanderson to contribute an "Ode to the Genius of Cumberland" to William Hutchinson's History of Cumberland (1794).

In 1799 Sanderson wrote a memoir of Josiah Relph, with a pastoral elegy, for an edition of the poet's works. In 1800 he published a volume of Original Poems.’ He published only two poems after 1800, while planning a long one on "Benevolence".

In 1807 Sanderson issued a Companion to the Lakes, a compilation from Thomas Pennant, William Gilpin, and Arthur Young, supplemented by personal knowledge. Cumbrian ballads are given in the appendix. He defended the literary style of David Hume against Gilbert Wakefield, in two essays in the Monthly Magazine, and contributed a memoir of Boucher to the Carlisle Patriot for July 1824. Other friends were Robert Anderson, the Cumbrian ballad-writer, to whose Works (ed. 1820) he contributed an essay on the peasantry of Cumberland, and John Howard, the mathematician.

Unlike his friends, Sanderson never wrote in dialect, but his rhymes occasionally showed the influence of local pronunciation. In 1829 appeared Life and Literary Remains of Thomas Sanderson, by J. Lowthian, rector of Sebergham, 1816–18.

== Notes ==
Attribution

This article incorporates text from a publication now in the public domain: Lee, Sidney, ed. (1897). "Sanderson, Thomas". Dictionary of National Biography. Vol. 50. London: Smith, Elder & Co.
