= Josiah Woodward =

Josiah Woodward (1657 – 1712) was an English Church of England clergyman and moral reformer. He was a devout Anglican and his advocacy of stringent adherence to Christian moral ethic is evident in the vast majority of his works.

== Religious views ==
At the opening of The divine original, and incomparable excellency of the Christian religion exclaims his belief in the Christian religion "as founded upon divine revelation". He believed that God had revealed to humans great truths which "they could not have found by their natural light." In Fair Warnings to a Careless World he discusses his dismay and what he considered the apparent decay of the "genuine vigor of the holy religion". In this text, he also makes clear his view that tyranny is the result of turning away from the Christian God, citing examples such as Nimrod and Balthazzar. Unsurprisingly, given his strong belief in religion being far superior to the state, he also expresses his opposition to the "atheistic principles of Thomas Hobbes" later in the work. In An account of the progress of the reformation of manner he also advocates promoting the titular reformation of manners and the elimination of "prophane swearing, debauchery, drunkenness and prophanation of the Lord's Day" through penal laws.

== Select bibliography ==
- A Disswasive from the Sin of Drunkenness
- Pastoral advice to a young person lately confirmed by the Bishop
- An account of the progress of the reformation of manners
- A kind caution to profane swearers''
- The necessary duty of family prayer
- Fair warnings to a careless world
- An earnest admonition to all, but especially to young persons: to turn to God by speedy repentance and reformation. Being the substance of six sermons, deliver'd in the chappel at Popler
- The baseness and perniciousness of the sin of slandering and backbiting
- The divine original, and incomparable excellency of the Christian religion
