= John Calverley =

English Anglican priest

John Calverley was an English Anglican priest in the 16th-century.

Calverley was educated at All Souls College, Oxford. He was appointed Rector of Stone, Kent in 1559, and of Beckenham in 1561, and Cliffe in 1572. He was Archdeacon of Rochester from 1574 until his death two years later.
