= Des Calverley =

Australian rules footballer, born 1919

- Calverley in 2011

Personal information
- Full name: Desmond Roy Calverley
- Born: 21 November 1919
- Died: 10 August 2016 (aged 96)
- Original team: Leitchville / Cohuna
- Height: 168 cm (5 ft 6 in)
- Weight: 67 kg (148 lb)

Playing career^{1}
Years	Club	Games (Goals)
1940–1946	Fitzroy	52 (16)
1946–1947	Richmond	18 (1)
Total		70 (17)
- ^{1} Playing statistics correct to the end of 1947.

Desmond Roy Calverley (21 November 1919 – 10 August 2016) was an Australian rules footballer who played for the Fitzroy Football Club and Richmond Football Club in the Victorian Football League (VFL).
