= Thomas Sanderson (priest) =

English Anglican priest

Thomas Sanderson (born c. 1561) was an English Anglican priest.

Sanderson was born in London and educated at Magdalen College, Oxford, matriculating at the age of 16 in December 1577. He was Fellow of Balliol College, Oxford, from 1585 to 1594. He was the incumbent at St Lawrence Jewry, in the City of London from 1594 to 1601; and All-Hallows-the-Great also in the city from 1601 to 1606. Sanderson was Archdeacon of Rochester from 1606 until 1614.
