= Norman Warren (priest) =

Archdeacon of Rochester

Norman Leonard Warren (19 July 1934 – 19 June 2019) was an Anglican priest and author.

He was born in London, England and educated at Dulwich College and Corpus Christi College, Cambridge Ordained in 1961, he began his ministry with a curacy in Bedworth. He held incumbencies in Leamington Priors and Morden; and was the Rural Dean of Merton. He was collated Archdeacon of Rochester in 1989 until his retirement in 2000. He died in June 2019.

His evangelistic tract Journey into Life, first issued in 1964, became a best-seller, with worldwide sales of 30 million.

Church of England titles
Preceded by Michael Turnbull	Archdeacon of Rochester; 1989–2000	Succeeded by Peter Lock
