= Ray Calverley =

Australian rules footballer

Personal information
- Full name: Ray Calverley
- Born: 2 April 1946 (age 80)
- Original teams: St Joseph's College, East Brunswick
- Height: 180 cm (5 ft 11 in)
- Weight: 75 kg (165 lb)

Playing career^{1}
Years	Club	Games (Goals)
1965–67	Fitzroy	21 (2)
- ^{1} Playing statistics correct to the end of 1967.

Ray Calverley (born 2 April 1946) is a former Australian rules footballer who played with Fitzroy in the Victorian Football League (VFL).
