= Hugh Calverley =

Hugh Calverley may refer to:

- Hugh Calveley (died 1394 or 1394), English knight and military commander
- Hugh Calverley (MP for Liverpool) (1578–1606)
- Hugh Calverley (hunter) (fl.1400s), silk weaver of the City of London
- Hugh Calverley (MP for Cheshire) (by 1506–58)
