= Thomas Staller =

English Anglican priest

Thomas Staller was an English Anglican priest.

Staller educated at the University of Oxford. He was Chaplain to Archbishop Matthew Parker and held the living at St Mary-at-Hill in the City of London. He was Archdeacon of Rochester from 1593 until his death in 1606.
