= John Denne =

English churchman and antiquarian

John Denne D.D. (1693–1767) was an English churchman and antiquarian, Archdeacon of Rochester from 1728.

== Life ==
Born at Littlebourne, Kent, on 25 May 1693, he was the eldest son of John Denne, woodreeve to the see of Canterbury. He was educated at Sandwich grammar school, King's School, Canterbury, and Corpus Christi College, Cambridge, where he graduated B.A. 1712, M.A. 1716, D.D. 1728. He was tutor and fellow of his college.

Denne was ordained in 1716, and was presented to the perpetual curacy of St Benedict's Church, Cambridge. He became rector of Norton-by-Daventry, Northamptonshire, in 1721, exchanging the living in 1723 for the vicarage of St Leonard's, Shoreditch. While he was vicar St. Leonard's was rebuilt. From 1725 to 1728 he delivered the Boyle lectures. In 1728 he became archdeacon and prebendary of Rochester. He also held the vicarage of St Margaret's Church, Rochester.

In 1731 Denne resigned his Rochester parish for the rectory of St. Mary's Church, Lambeth. He was for some time prolocutor of the lower house of convocation. From about 1759 he suffered from ill-health. He died on 5 August 1767, and was buried in Rochester Cathedral.

== Works ==
Denne was a scholar of English ecclesiastical history. He published:

- Articles of Enquiry for a Parochial Visitation, 1732.
- The State of Bromley College in Kent, 1735.
- Register of Benefactors to the Parish of St. Leonard, Shoreditch, London, 1777 (posthumous).
- Fifteen sermons (published separately), including Want of Universality no just Objection to the Truth of the Christian Religion, London, 1730, and The Blessing of a Protestant King and Royal Family to the Nation, 1737.

Denne also contributed materials to John Lewis's Life of Wickliffe. He arranged and bound up the archives of Rochester Cathedral and the Acts of the Courts of the Bishop and Archdeacon. He also made some collections for the history of the cathedral, and collated Thomas Hearne's edition of the Textus Roffensis with the original at Rochester.

== Family ==
Denne married in 1724 Susannah, youngest daughter of Samuel Bradford, bishop of Rochester, to whom he was for many years domestic chaplain. He had three children, John (d. 1800), chaplain of Maidstone gaol; Samuel, the antiquarian; and Susannah.

== Notes ==
Attribution

This article incorporates text from a publication now in the public domain: Stephen, Leslie, ed. (1888). "Denne, John". Dictionary of National Biography. Vol. 14. London: Smith, Elder & Co.
