= Archdeacon of Rochester =

Church of England ecclesiastical office

The archdeacon of Rochester is a senior office-holder in the Diocese of Rochester, a division of the Church of England Province of Canterbury. Like other archdeacons, they are administrators in the diocese at large (having oversight of parishes in roughly one-third of the diocese).

== History ==
The first archdeacon of Rochester is recorded c. 1096, at approximately the same sort of time as archdeacons were being appointed across the country. At this point, this archdeacon was the sole archdeacon in the diocese, functioning as an assistant to the bishop. The archidiaconal and diocesan boundaries remained similar for almost 750 years until 1 January 1846 when the three archdeaconries of Colchester, Essex and St Albans from the Diocese of London were added to the diocese while all of west Kent but the Deanery of Rochester was given to the Diocese of Canterbury – at this point, the diocese covered all of Essex. The archdeaconry of Rochester, having been reduced severely, was first suppressed at the next vacancy (Walter King's death in 1859) then held by the archdeacon of St Albans. The archdeaconry was then given to Canon Cheetham, a residentiary canon of Rochester Cathedral and the bishop's examining chaplain, who held it until after the Kentish territory was returned.

Those three archdeaconries created the new Diocese of St Albans in 1877, but the diocese received part of Surrey (which part was constituted into the Southwark archdeaconry the next year) a few months later: in 1879 the Kingston archdeaconry was split off from Southwark; those two archdeaconries were erected into the Diocese of Southwark in 1905 while west Kent was returned to the Rochester diocese – immediately prior to that date the Diocese of Rochester covered a large portion of Surrey (now southern Greater London) immediately south of the Thames. Once again, Rochester was the sole archdeaconry of the diocese until it was split to create the Archdeaconry of Tonbridge in 1906; it was further split in 1955 to create the Archdeaconry of Bromley, so that there are today three archdeaconries in the present diocese, covering West Kent plus the two London boroughs of Bromley and Bexley – an area broadly similar to that covered until 1846.

== List of archdeacons ==
=== High Medieval ===
- bef. 1107–aft. 1107: Ansketil
- bef. 1122–aft. 1115: Hervey or Herwis
- bef. 1134–bef. 1145 (res.): Robert Pullen (became cardinal-priest of San Martino ai Monti)
- bef. 1145–aft. 1190: Paris
- bef. 1193–aft. 1225: William son of Peter
- bef. 1238–aft. 1245: a vicar of Frindsbury
- bef. 1253–1274 (d.): William de Sancto Martino
- bef. 1278–1288 (d.): John de Sancto Dionysio
- bef. 1289–9 February 1321 (deprived): Roger de Weseham

=== Late Medieval ===
- 1321–bef. 1323 (res.): Pierre Cardinal Desprès (Cardinal-priest of Santa Pudenziana)
- 1323–bef. 1359 (res.): William de le Dene
- 20 June 1359–bef. 1364 (res.): William Reade
- 1364–aft. 1366: William Wyvel of Wenlock
- bef. 1368–aft. 1368: Roger
- ?–bef. 1373 (res.): William de Navesby
- 1373–bef. 1396 (d.): Roger de Denford
- 31 July 1396 – 1400 (d.): Thomas Halle
- bef. 1402–aft. 1402: William Hunden
- bef. 1418–1418 (d.): William Purcell
- 1420–bef. 1452 (d.): Richard Cordon or Brouns
- 21 November 1452–aft. 1467: John Lowe
- bef. 1474–aft. 1475: Roger Rotherham
- bef. 1480–1489 (d.): Henry Sharp
- bef. 1497–bef. 1512 (res.): Henry Edyall
- 26 November 1512–bef. 1537 (res.): Nicholas Metcalfe
- 27 August 1537 – 1554 (res.): Maurice Griffith (became Bishop of Rochester)

=== Early modern ===
- 20 July 1554–bef. 1560 (res.): John Kennall
- 3 February 1560–bef. 1571 (res.): John Bridgewater
- 10 July 1571–bef. 1576 (d.): John Calverley
- 5 July 1576–bef. 1593 (res.): Ralph Pickover (became Archdeacon of Salisbury)
- 2 July 1593 – 1606 (d.): Thomas Staller
- 13 August 1606–bef. 1614 (d.): Thomas Sanderson
- 9 April 1614 – 1624 (d.): Richard Tillesley
- 20 April 1625–bef. 1652 (d.): Elizeus Burgess
- 1660–12 June 1679 (d.): John Lee
- 21 June 1679 – 20 November 1704 (d.): Thomas Plume
- 4 December 1704 – 10 May 1720 (d.): Thomas Sprat
- 24 May 1720 – 10 May 1728 (d.): the Hon Henry Bridges
- 23 June–15 July 1728 (d.): William Bradford
- 22 July 1728 – 5 August 1767 (d.): John Denne
- 3 September 1767 – 5 February 1827 (d.): John Law
- 6 July 1827 – 13 March 1859 (d.): Walker King

=== Late modern ===
- 1859–1863: archdeaconry suppressed (from King's death) by Order in Council, 8 August 1845
- 1863–1882 (res.): Anthony Grant, Archdeacon of St Albans
- 1882–9 July 1908 (d.): Samuel Cheetham (previously Archdeacon of Southwark)
- 1908–29 April 1915 (d.): Tetley Rowe
- 1915–24 September 1932 (d.): Donald Tait (also Vice-Dean of Rochester from 1924)
- 1933–1951 (ret.): Walter Browne (afterwards archdeacon emeritus)
- 1951–1969 (ret.): Lawrence Harland (afterwards archdeacon emeritus)
- 1969–1976 (ret.): David Stewart-Smith
- 1977–1983 (res.): Derek Palmer
- 1984–1988 (res.): Michael Turnbull (became Bishop of Rochester)
- 1989–2000 (res.): Norman Warren
- 2001–2009 (ret.): Peter Lock
- 24 January 2010 – 3 July 2018 (res.): Simon Burton-Jones (became Bishop of Tonbridge)
- 11 September 2018 – 14 September 2024 (res.): Andy Wooding Jones
- 23 February 2025 – present: Sandra McCalla

== Sources ==
- Greenway, Diana E. (1971), Fasti Ecclesiae Anglicanae 1066–1300, vol. 2, pp. 81–82
- Jones, B. (1963), Fasti Ecclesiae Anglicanae 1300–1541, vol. 4, pp. 41–42
- Horn, Joyce M. (1974), Fasti Ecclesiae Anglicanae 1541–1857, vol. 3, pp. 57–59
