= Garden Township =

Garden Township may refer to:

== United States ==
- Garden Township, Woodruff County, Arkansas, a township in Woodruff County, Arkansas
- Garden Township, Iowa
- Garden Township, Cherokee County, Kansas
- Garden Township, Harvey County, Kansas
- Garden Township, Michigan
- Garden Township, Polk County, Minnesota

== Zambia ==
- Garden Township, Lusaka

== See also ==
- Garden (disambiguation)
- The Garden (disambiguation)
- Garden town (disambiguation)
- Green Garden Township (disambiguation)
- New Garden Township, Wayne County, Indiana
- Spring Garden Township, Jefferson County, Illinois
