= Garden (surname) =

Garden is a surname. Notable people with the surname include:

- Alexander Garden (naturalist) (1730–1791), known by the botanical author abbreviation "Garden"
- Alexander Garden (poet), Scottish poet from Aberdeenshire
- Francis Garden (disambiguation):
  - Francis Garden, Lord Gardenstone (1721–1793), Scottish judge, joint Solicitor General for Scotland 1760–64, Lord of Session 1764–93
  - Francis Garden (theologian) (1810–1884), English theologian
- George Garden (politician) (c. 1772–1828), Scottish-born businessman and politician in Lower Canada
- George Garden (minister) (1649–1733), Scottish church minister
- Graeme Garden (born 1943), British comedy writer and performer
- Henry Garden (1868–1949), Irish footballer
- James Garden (1847–1914), engineer and Mayor of Vancouver
- Jennifer Garden, British chemist
- Jock Garden (1882–1968), founder of Australia's communist party
- Mary Garden (1874–1967), Scottish-American operatic soprano
- Nancy Garden (1938–2014), American author of children's and young adult literature
- Stuart Garden (born 1972), Scottish football player and manager
- Timothy Garden, Baron Garden (1944–2007), formerly a senior Royal Air Force commander, now a politician
- William Brownie Garden, inventor
