= Public Garden =

Public Garden may refer to:

- Boston Public Garden
- Public Garden (EP)
- Public Gardens, Hyderabad, India
- Cognac Public Garden, Cognac, France
- Halifax Public Gardens, Halifax, Nova Scotia, Canada
- Huangpu Park, Shanghai, China, formerly known as the Public Garden

== See also ==
- Garden (disambiguation)
- Urban park
