= Garden (disambiguation) =

A garden is an area set aside for the cultivation and enjoyment of plant and other natural life.

Garden(s) may also refer to:

== Arts, entertainment, and media ==
=== Music ===
- "Garden", a 1983 song by the Fall from Perverted by Language
- "Garden", a 1991 song by Pearl Jam from Ten
- "Garden", a 2017 song by Dua Lipa from Dua Lipa
- "Garden", a 2003 song by Sayaka Kanda
- "Garden", a 2018 song by Kanye West from Yandhi
- "Garden", a 2020 song by Meet Me at the Altar
- Garden (album), a live album by Cecil Taylor
- "Garden" (Totally Enormous Extinct Dinosaurs song), 2011
- Gardens, an EP by The Beast
- Gardens (album), by Sly Withers, 2021

=== Other uses in arts, entertainment, and media ===
- Garden (Final Fantasy VIII), a group of military academies in the video game Final Fantasy VIII
- Garden, one of the linked diptych of plays by Alan Ayckbourn published together as House & Garden
- Garden, one of the television idents in the BBC Two '1991–2001' idents package
- "Gardens", a Series G episode of the television series QI (2009)

== Computing and technology ==
- CSS Zen Garden, a web development resource
- Garden framework, upon which the Vanilla forum is built
- Walled garden, another name for a closed system

== People ==
- Garden (surname)

== Places ==
=== United States ===
- Garden, Michigan
- Garden, Ohio
- Garden, Utah
- Garden County, Nebraska
- Garden Lake, a lake in Minnesota
- Garden Township (disambiguation), several

=== Elsewhere ===
- Garden, Karachi, one of the neighbourhoods of Saddar Town in Karachi, Sindh, Pakistan
- Gardens, Cape Town, a suburb of Cape Town, South Africa

== Other uses ==
- Hans Majestet Kongens Garde, a battalion of the Norwegian Army, nicknamed "Garden"
- The Garden Company Limited, a Hong Kong–based bakery and confectionery manufacturer

== See also ==
- The Garden (disambiguation)
- Garden State (disambiguation)
- Garden Island (disambiguation), several
- Home garden (disambiguation)
- Kent, an English county nicknamed the "Garden of England"
- List of garden types
- List of gardens
- Torture Garden (disambiguation)
