= William Scott (Anglican priest, born 1813) =

English clergyman

William Scott (1813–1872) was an English clergyman, a leading High Church figure of his time.

== Life ==
Born in London on 2 May 1813 (13 May according to another source), he was the second son of Thomas Scott, merchant, of Clement's Lane and Newington, Surrey. In October 1827 he was entered at Merchant Taylors' School, and on 14 June 1831 he matriculated at The Queen's College, Oxford, as Michel exhibitioner. He was Michel scholar in 1834–8, and graduated B.A. in 1835 and M.A. in 1839. Ordained deacon in 1836 and priest in 1837, he held three curacies, the last of which was under William Dodsworth at Christ Church, Albany Street, London. In 1839 he was made perpetual curate of Christ Church, Hoxton, where he remained till 1860, and was widely known as ‘Scott of Hoxton.’ In 1860 he was appointed by Lord-chancellor John Campbell, 1st Baron Campbell vicar of St Olave's, Jewry, with St Martin Pomeroy.

Scott was an active member of the high-church party. When in 1841 the Christian Remembrancer was set up, he was made co-editor with Francis Garden. In 1844, when it became a quarterly, James Bowling Mozley for a short time succeeded Garden, but during a large part of the life of the paper, which ended in 1868, Scott was sole editor. He felt deeply the conversion of John Henry Newman to Catholicism, though personally unacquainted with him. Scott took a leading part in the agitation following the Gorham judgment. His ‘Letter to the Rev. Daniel Wilson,’ 1850, a reply to Daniel Wilson's bitter attack on the Tractarians, passed through four editions. In 1846 he joined Edward Pusey and his associates in their efforts to prevent the ordination at St Paul's Cathedral of Samuel Gobat, the Lutheran bishop-elect of Jerusalem. Ten years later he was, with Pusey, John Keble, and others, one of the eighteen clergy who signed the protest against Archbishop John Bird Sumner's condemnation of Archdeacon George Anthony Denison. Scott's advice was sought by the bishops Henry Phillpotts and Walter Kerr Hamilton. Richard William Church was a close friend.

He was among the founders of the Saturday Review, to which he contributed, and was a member of Mr. William Gladstone's election committees at Oxford. He was one of the prime movers in the formation in 1848 of the London Union on Church Matters, and from 1859 onwards was chairman of the committee of the Ecclesiological Society. He was one of the chief advisers of Henry Hart Milman and Henry Longueville Mansel in the work of restoration at St Paul's Cathedral, acting for some time as honorary secretary of the restoration committee. In 1858 Scott was elected president of Sion College, and next year published a continuation of the ‘Account’ of the college by John Russell.

Scott died on 11 January 1872 of spinal disease. He married Margaret Beloe, granddaughter of William Beloe, and had three sons and two daughters. One of his sons was the critic Clement Scott.

== Works ==
In 1841 he edited, with additions and illustrations, Roger Laurence's Lay Baptism invalid; and in 1847, for the Library of Anglo-Catholic Theology, the works of William Laud in seven volumes. Several of his sermons are in A. Watson's Collection. His Plain Words for Plain People, 1844, censured the Society for Promoting Christian Knowledge for garbling theological works.

== Notes ==
Attribution

This article incorporates text from a publication now in the public domain: "Scott, William (1813-1872)". Dictionary of National Biography. London: Smith, Elder & Co. 1885–1900.
