= Mace (bludgeon) =

Blunt striking weapon

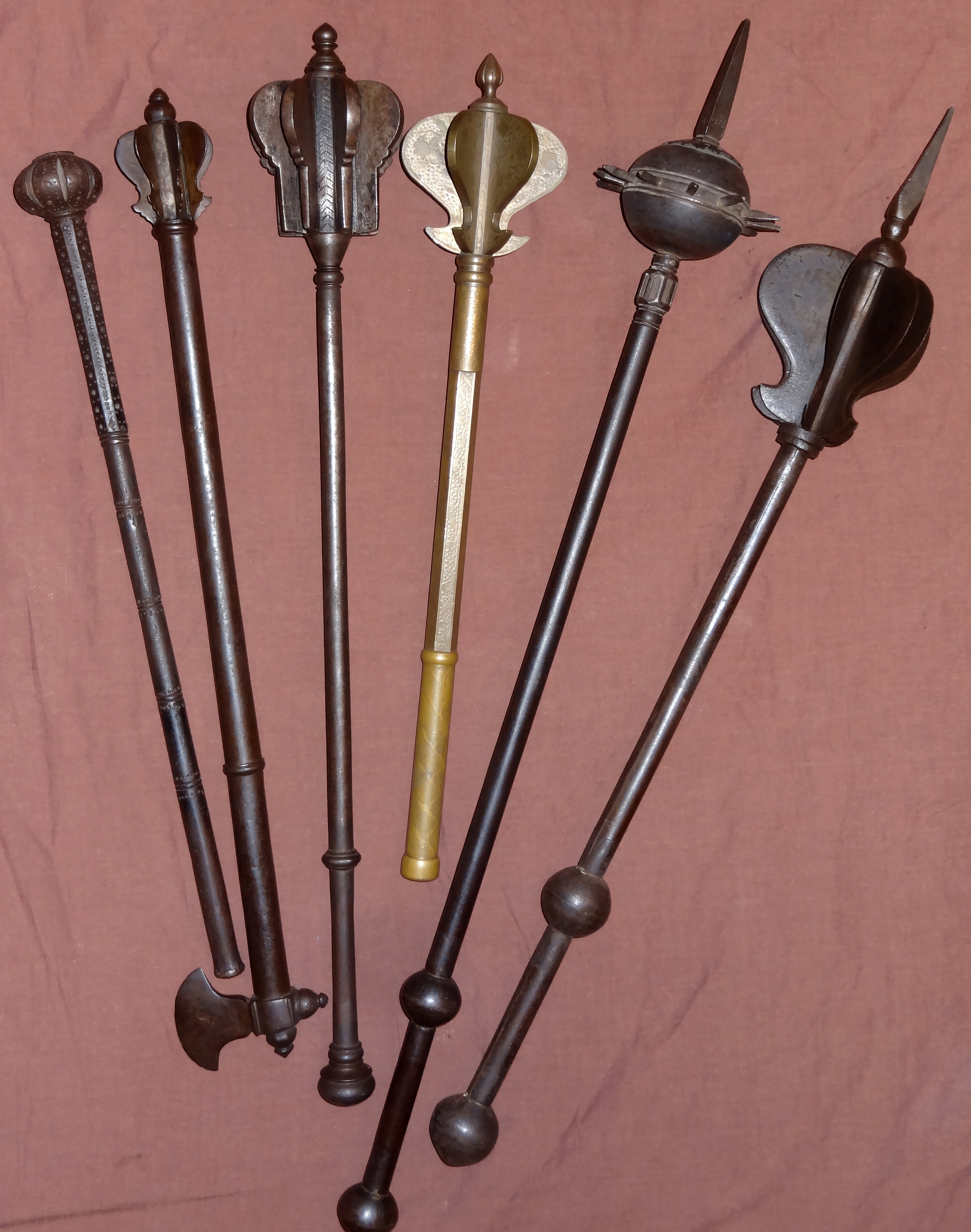
Various Eastern maces, from left: Bozdogan/buzdygan (Ottoman), tabar-shishpar (Indian), shishpar (Indian), shishpar (Indian), gurz (Indian), shishpar (Indian).

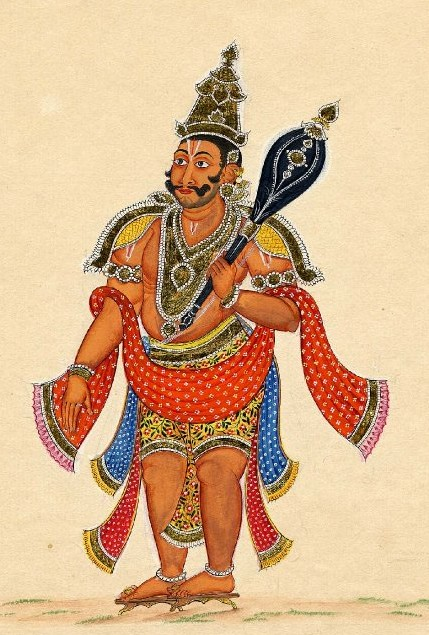
A mural of Bhima with his mace

A mace is a blunt weapon, a type of club or virge that uses a heavy head on the end of a handle to deliver powerful strikes. A mace typically consists of a strong, heavy, wooden or metal shaft, often reinforced with metal, featuring a head made of stone, bone, copper, bronze, iron, or steel.

The head of a mace can be shaped with flanges or knobs to increase the pressure of an impact by focusing the force on a small point. They would bind on metal instead of sliding around it, allowing them to deliver more force to an armored opponent than a traditional mace. This effect increased the potential for the mace to injure an armored opponent through weak spots in the armor, and even damage plate armor by denting it, potentially binding overlapping plates and impeding the wearer's range of motion.

Maces are rarely used today for actual combat, but many government bodies (for instance, the British House of Commons and the U.S. Congress), universities and other institutions have ceremonial maces and continue to display them as symbols of authority. They are often paraded in academic, parliamentary or civic rituals and processions.

== Etymology ==
The modern English word mace entered Middle English from Old French mace, ("large mallet/sledgehammer, mace") itself from a Vulgar Latin term *mattia or *mattea (cf. Italian mazza, "club, baton, mace"), probably from Latin mateola (uncertain, possibly a kind of club, hammer, or "hoe handle/stick"). Possibly influenced by Latin mattiobarbulus ("type of javelin"), mattiarius ("soldier armed with said javelin"), from mataris, matara ("Gallic javelin"), from a Gaulish or Celtic word.

== Development history ==
=== Prehistory ===
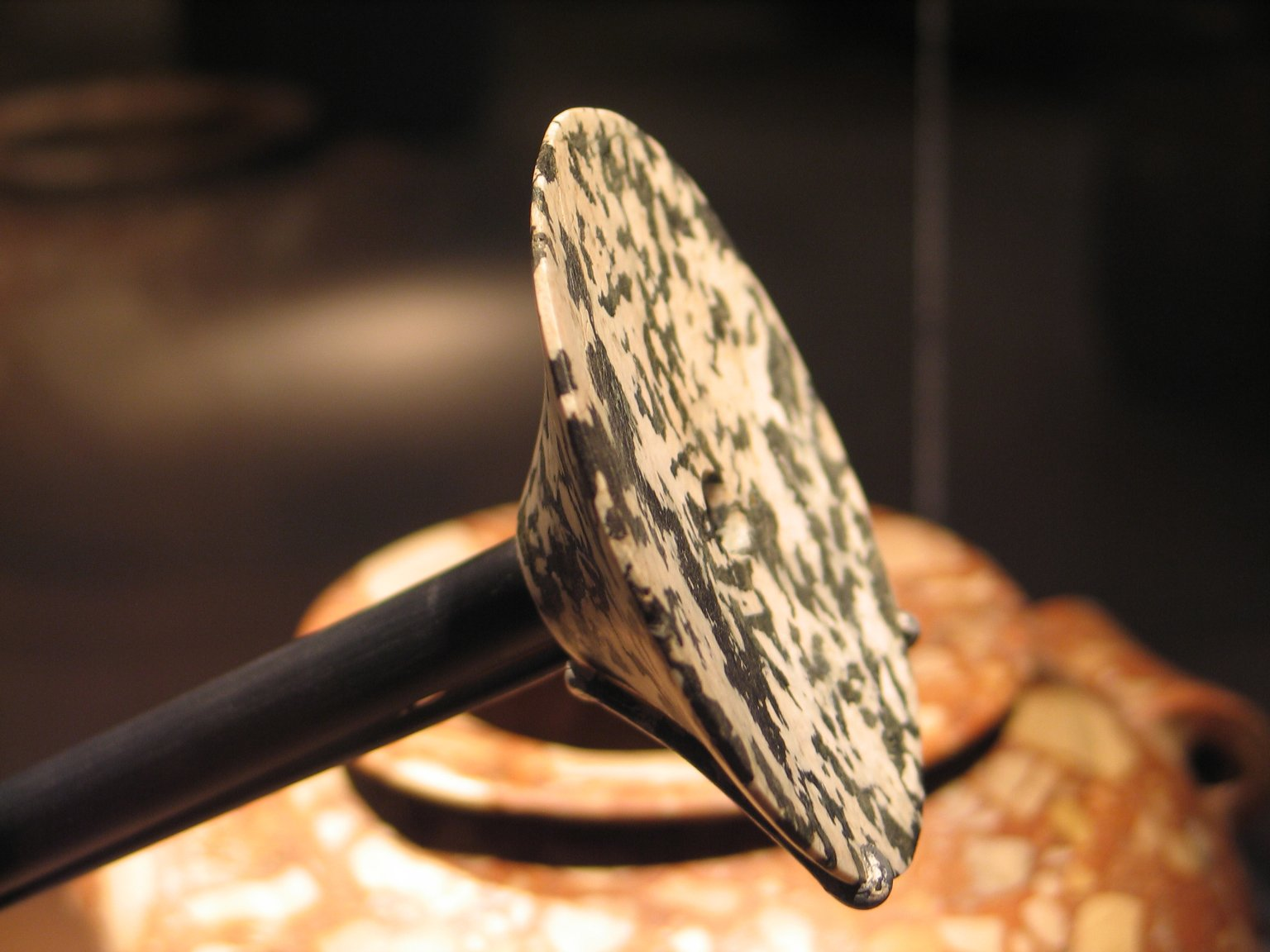
Disc-shaped stone macehead, Egypt, Naqada culture

The mace was developed during the Upper Paleolithic from the simple club, by adding sharp spikes of either flint or obsidian.

In Europe, an elaborately carved ceremonial flint mace head was one of the artifacts discovered in excavations of the Neolithic mound of Knowth in Ireland, and Bronze Age archaeology cites numerous finds of perforated mace heads.

In ancient Ukraine, stone mace heads were first used nearly eight millennia ago. The others known were disc maces with oddly formed stones mounted perpendicularly to their handle. The Narmer Palette shows a king swinging a mace. See the articles on the Narmer Macehead and the Scorpion Macehead for examples of decorated maces inscribed with the names of kings.

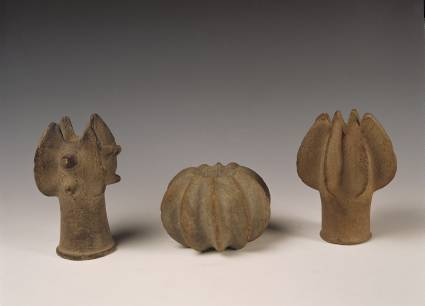
Moche stone maces, Larco Museum, Lima, Peru

The problem with early maces was that their stone heads shattered easily and it was difficult to fix the head to the wooden handle reliably. The Egyptians attempted to give them a disk shape in the predynastic period (about 3850–3650 BCE) in order to increase their impact and even provide some cutting capabilities, but this seems to have been a short-lived improvement.

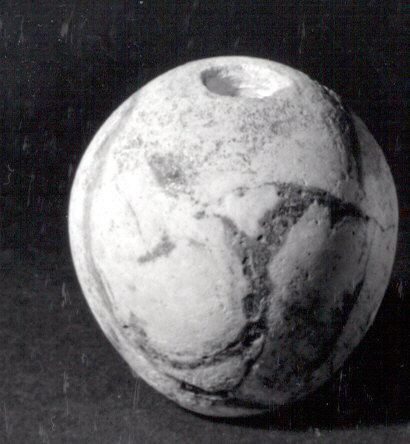
Calcite mace head, 7th–6th millennium BCE, Syria

A rounded pear form of mace head known as a "piriform" replaced the disc mace in the Naqada II period of pre-dynastic Upper Egypt (3600–3250 BCE) and was used throughout the Naqada III period (3250–3100 BCE). Similar mace heads were also used in Mesopotamia around 2450–1900 BCE. On a Sumerian Clay tablet written by the scribe Gar.Ama, the title Lord of the Mace is listed in the year 3100 BCE. The Assyrians used maces probably about nineteenth century BCE and in their campaigns; the maces were usually made of stone or marble and furnished with gold or other metals, but were rarely used in battle unless fighting heavily armoured infantry.

An important, later development in mace heads was the use of metal for their composition. With the advent of copper mace heads, they no longer shattered and a better fit could be made to the wooden club by giving the eye of the mace head the shape of a cone and using a tapered handle.

The Shardanas or warriors from Sardinia who fought for Ramses II against the Hittites were armed with maces consisting of wooden sticks with bronze heads. Many bronze statuettes of the times show Sardinian warriors carrying swords, bows and original maces.

=== Ancient history ===
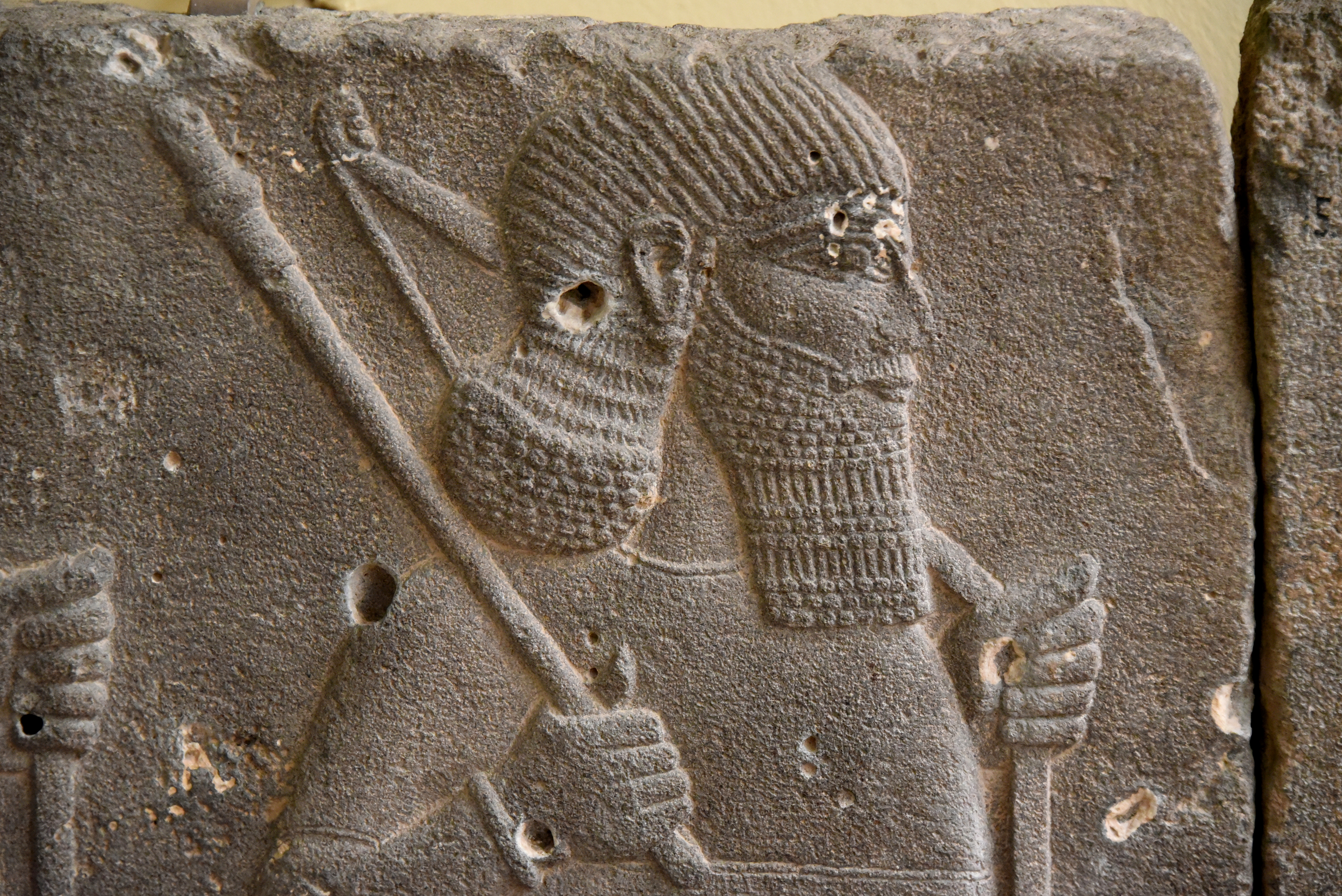
Assyrian soldier holding a mace and a bow. Detail of a basalt relief from the palace of Tiglath-pileser III at Hadatu, Syria. 744–727 BCE. Ancient Orient Museum, Istanbul.

Persians used a variety of maces and fielded large numbers of heavily armoured and armed cavalry (see Cataphract). For a heavily armed Persian knight, a mace was as effective as a sword or battle axe. In fact, Shahnameh has many references to heavily armoured knights facing each other using maces, axes, and swords. The enchanted talking mace Sharur made its first appearance in Sumerian/Akkadian mythology during the epic of Ninurta.

The Indian epics Ramayana and Mahabharata describe the extensive use of the gada in ancient Indian warfare as gada-yuddha or 'mace combat'.

The ancient Romans did not make wide use of maces, probably because of the influence of armour, and due to the nature of the Roman infantry's fighting style which involved the Pilum (spear) and the Gladius (short sword used in a stabbing fashion), though auxiliaries from Syria Palestina were armed with clubs and maces at the battles of Immae and Emesa in 272 CE. They proved highly effective against the heavily armoured horsemen of Palmyra.

=== Post classical history ===
==== Western Europe ====
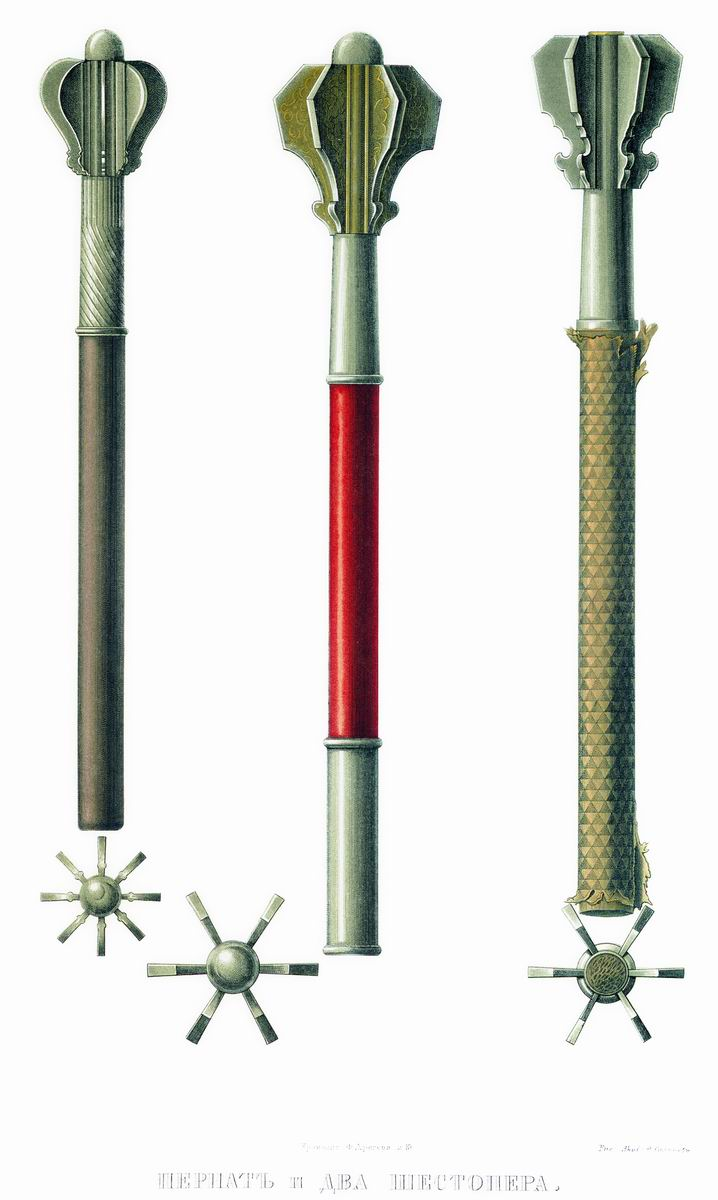
Pernach (left) and two shestopyors

During the Middle Ages metal armour such as mail protected against the blows of edged weapons. Though iron became increasingly common, copper and bronze were also used, especially in iron-deficient areas.

One example of a mace capable of penetrating armour is the flanged mace. The flanges allow it to dent or penetrate thick armour. Flange maces did not become popular until after knobbed maces. Although there are some references to flanged maces (bardoukion) as early as the Byzantine Empire c. 900 it is commonly accepted that the flanged mace did not become popular in Europe until the 12th century, when it was concurrently developed in Russia and Mid-west Asia.

Maces, being simple to make, cheap, and straightforward in application, were quite common weapons.

It is popularly believed that maces were employed by the clergy in warfare to avoid shedding blood (sine effusione sanguinis). The evidence for this is sparse and appears to derive almost entirely from the depiction of Bishop Odo of Bayeux wielding a club-like mace at the Battle of Hastings in 1066 in the Bayeux Tapestry, the idea being that he did so to avoid either shedding blood or bearing the arms of war.

In the 1893 work Arms and Armour in Antiquity and the Middle Ages, Paul Lacombe and Charles Boutell state that the mace was chiefly used for blows struck upon the head of an enemy.

==== Eastern Europe ====
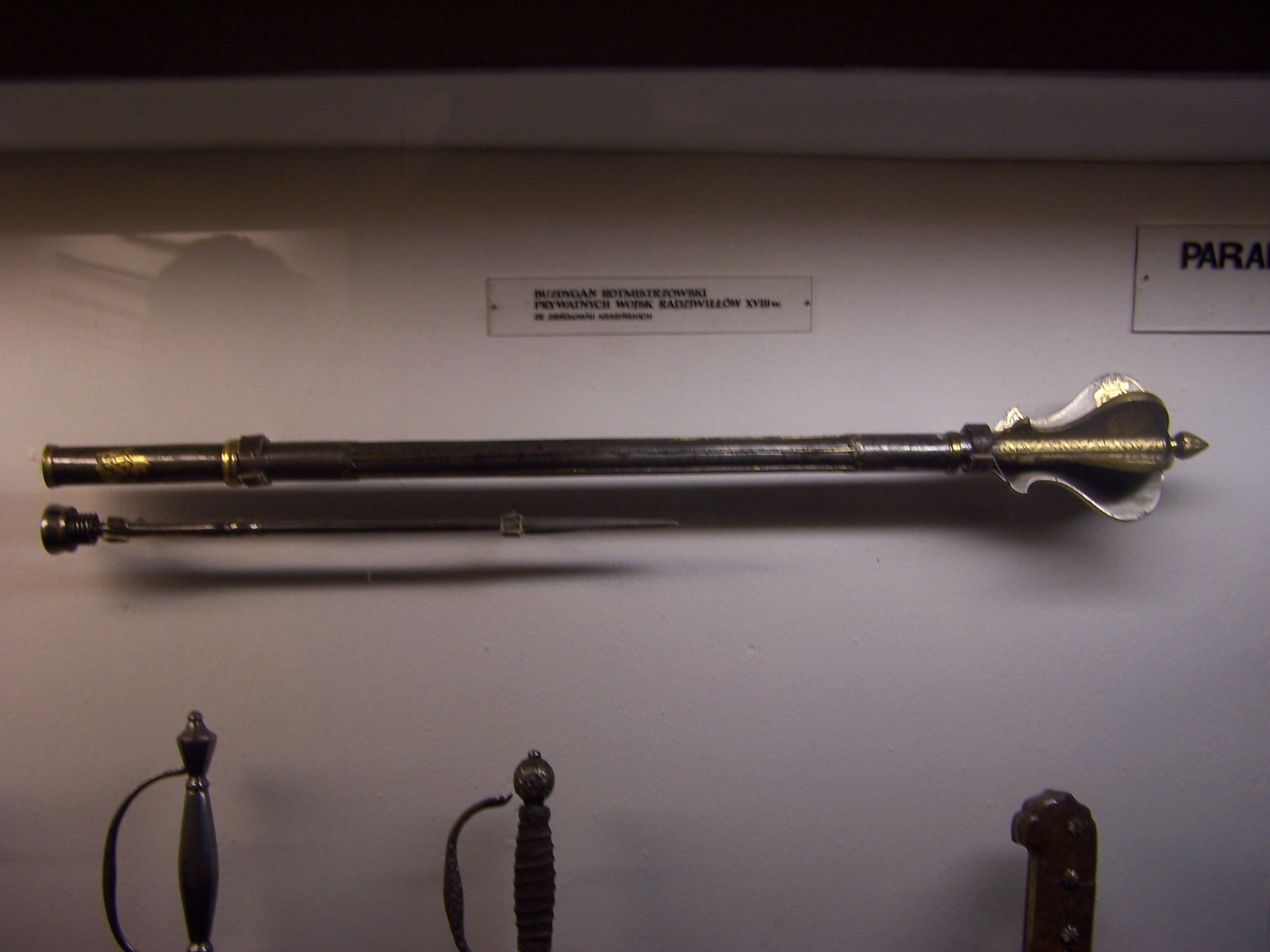
Shestopyor-type mace (in literal translation six-feathers) used by the rotmistrzs of the private army of the Radziwiłł family

Eastern European maces often had pear shaped heads. These maces were also used by the Moldavian ruler Stephen the Great in some of his wars (see Bulawa).

The mace is also the favourite weapon of Prince Marko, a hero in South Slavic epic poetry.

The pernach was a type of flanged mace developed since the 12th century in the region of Kievan Rus', and later widely used throughout the whole of Europe. The name comes from the Slavic word pero (перо) meaning feather, reflecting the form of pernach that resembled a fletched arrow. Pernachs were the first form of the flanged mace to enjoy a wide usage. It was well suited to penetrate plate armour and chain mail. In the later times it was often used as a symbol of power by the military leaders in Eastern Europe.

==== Pre-Columbian America ====
The cultures of pre-Columbian America used clubs and maces extensively. The warriors of the Moche state and the Inca Empire used maces with bone, stone or copper heads and wooden shafts. The quauholōlli was used in Mesoamerica.

==== Asia ====
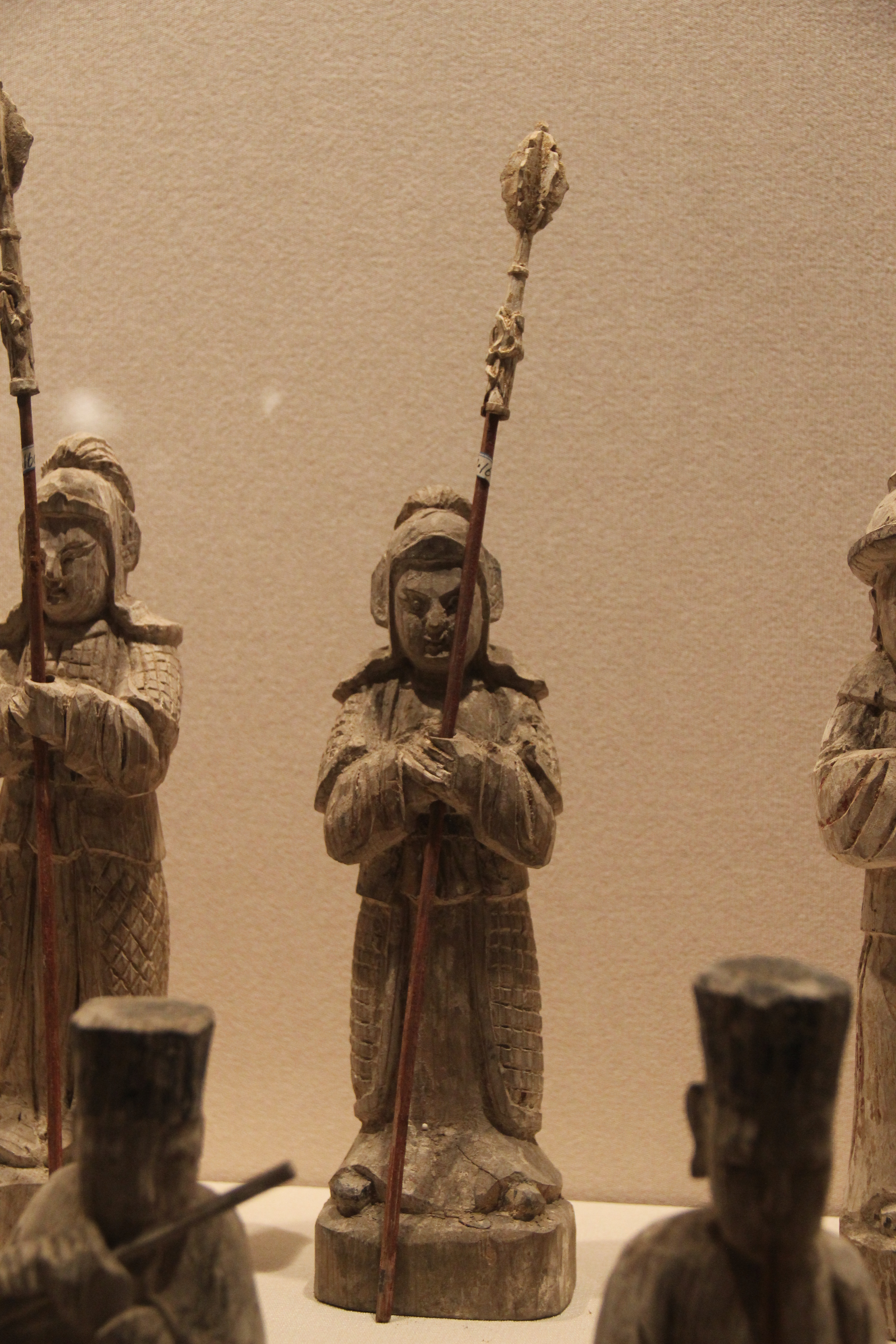
Mace polearm-wielding figurine from the tomb of Ming dynasty prince Zhu Tan, 10th son of the Hongwu Emperor

Maces in Asia were most often steel clubs with a spherical head. In Persia, the "Gorz" (spherical-head mace) served as a primary combat arm across many eras, most often being used by heavy infantry or Cataphracts. In India a form of these clubs was used by wrestlers to exercise the arms and shoulders. They have been known as gada since ancient times.

During the Mughal era, the flanged mace of Persia was introduced to South Asia. The term shishpar is a Persian phrase which literally translates to "six-wings", to refer to the (often) six flanges on the mace. The shishpar mace was introduced by the Delhi Sultanate and continued to be utilized until the 18th century.

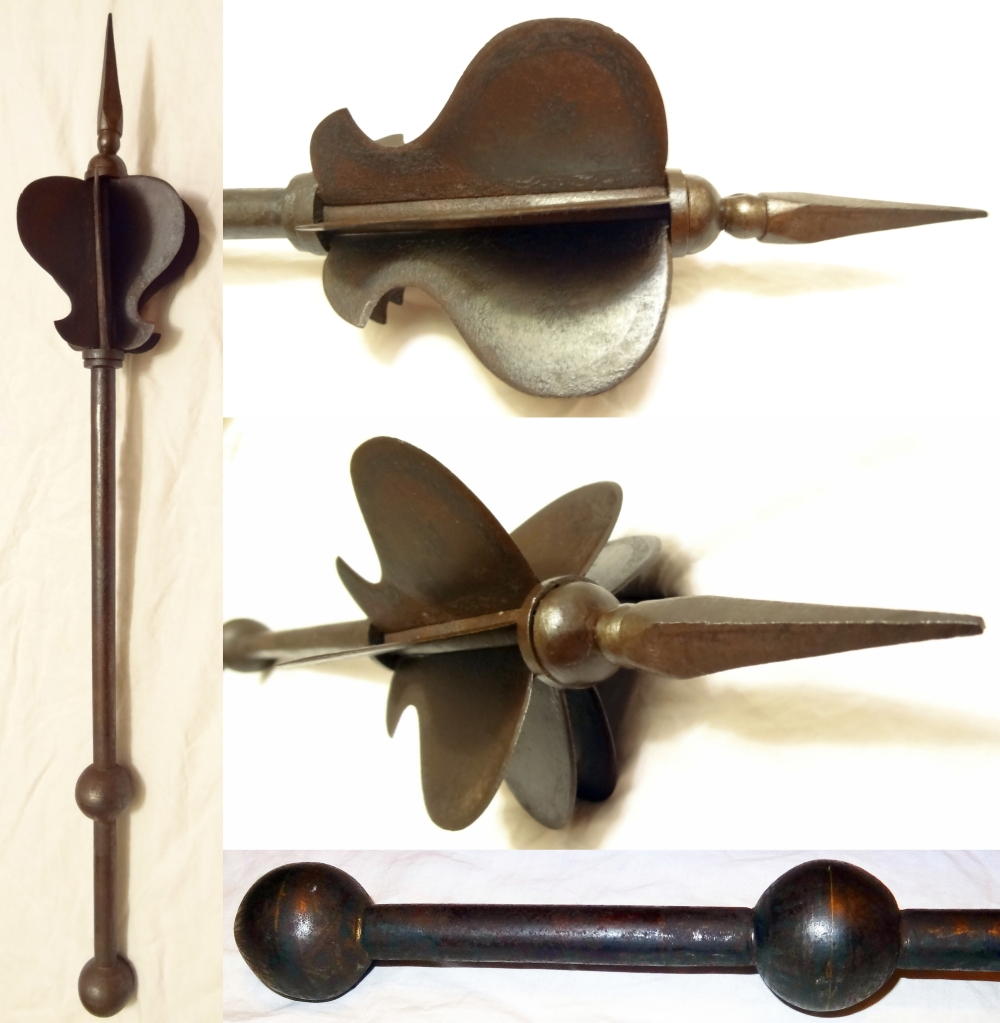
Indian shishpar (flanged mace), all-steel construction, with eight knife-edged, hinged flanges, 18th-19th century, 26 in (660 mm) long

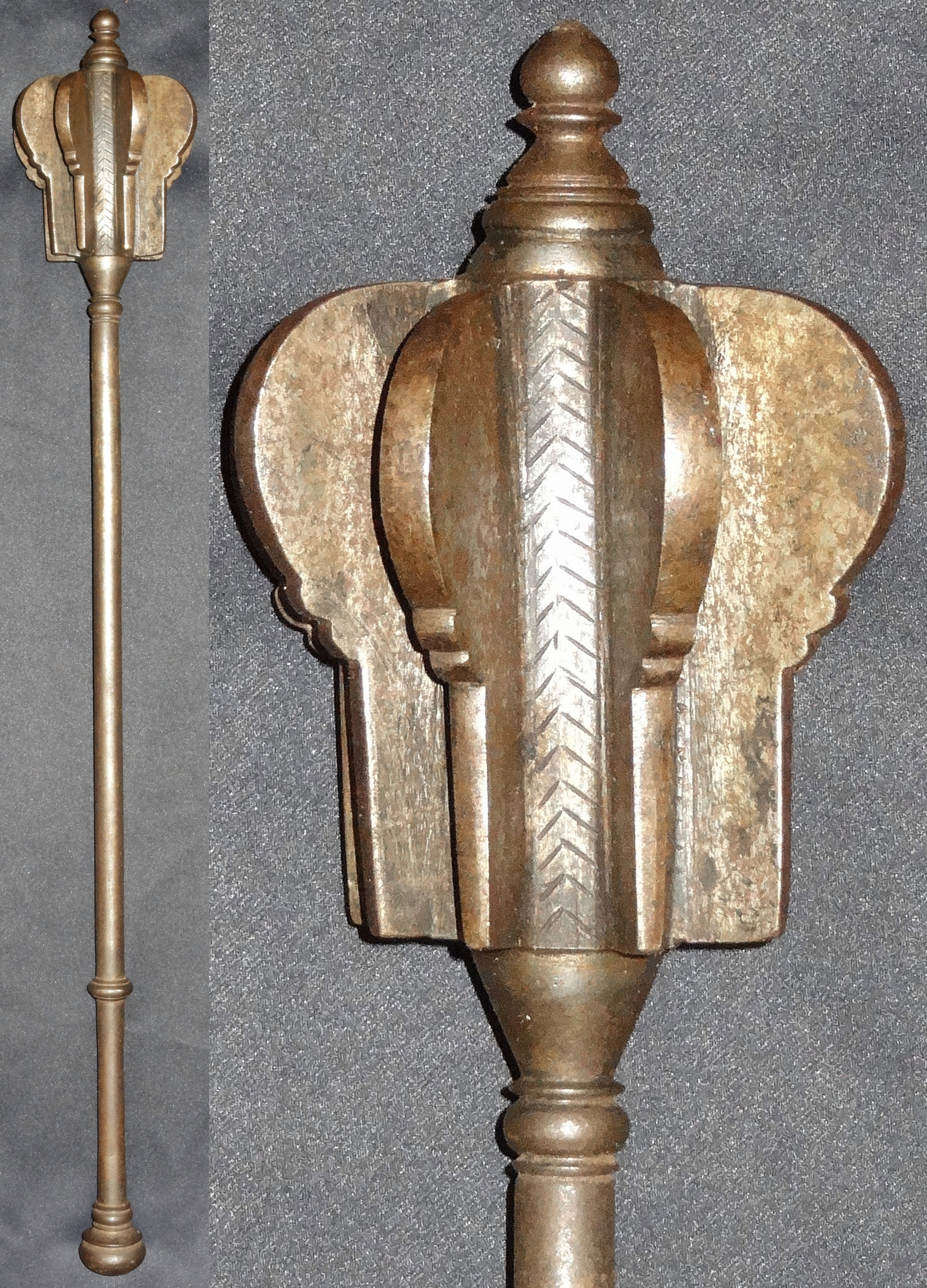
Indian shishpar (flanged mace), steel with solid shaft and eight-flanged head, 24 in (610 mm)

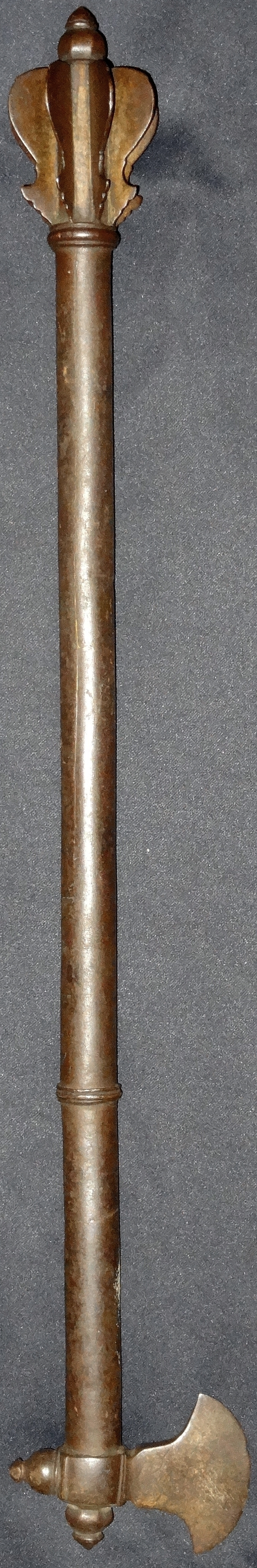
Indian (Deccan) tabar-shishpar, an extremely rare combination tabar axe and shishpar eight-flanged mace, steel with hollow shaft, 21.75 in (552 mm), 17th to 18th century

=== Modern history ===
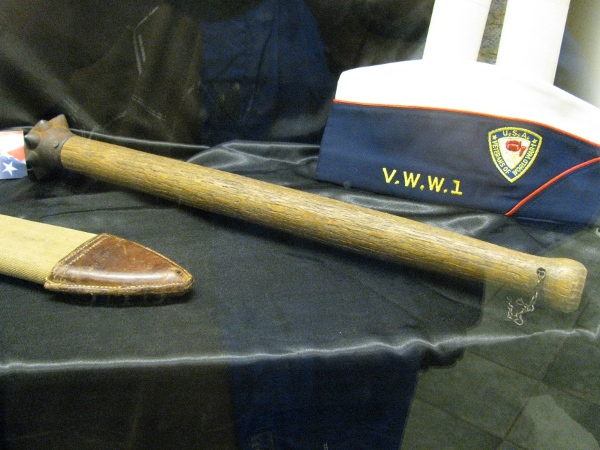
World War I trench raiding club

Trench raiding clubs used during World War I were modern variations on the medieval mace. They were homemade mêlée weapons used by both the Allies and the Central Powers. Clubs were used during night time trench raiding expeditions as a quiet and effective way of killing or wounding enemy soldiers.

Makeshift maces were also found in the possession of some football hooligans in the 1980s.

Maces are sometimes used in the sport of buhurt as a substitute for a sword.

In 2020 China–India skirmishes personnel of People's Liberation Army Ground Force were seen using makeshift maces consisting of batons wrapped in barbed wire and clubs embedded with nails.

Some units of the People's Police of China carry two-handed maces. Reportedly these are used for disabling errant martial artists.

== Ceremonial use ==
Maces have had a role in ceremonial practices over time, including some still in use today.

=== Parliamentary maces ===
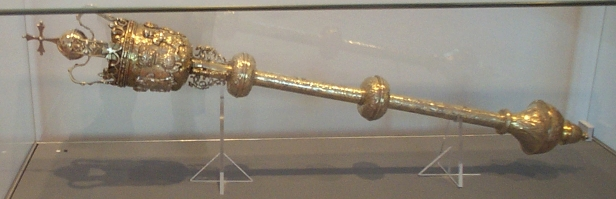
Mace of the Royal Society, granted by Charles II

The ceremonial mace is a short, richly ornamented staff often made of silver, the upper part of which is furnished with a knob or other head-piece and decorated with a coat of arms. The ceremonial mace was commonly borne before eminent ecclesiastical corporations, magistrates, and academic bodies as a mark and symbol of jurisdiction.

Ceremonial maces are important in many parliaments following the Westminster system. They are carried in by the sergeant-at-arms or some other mace-bearers and displayed on the clerks' table while parliament is in session to show that a parliament is fully constituted. They are removed when the session ends. The mace is also removed from the table when a new speaker is being elected to show that parliament is not ready to conduct business.

=== Ecclesiastical maces ===
Maces may also be carried before clergy members in church processions, although in the case of the Roman Catholic pope and cardinals, they have largely been replaced with processional crosses.

=== Parade maces ===
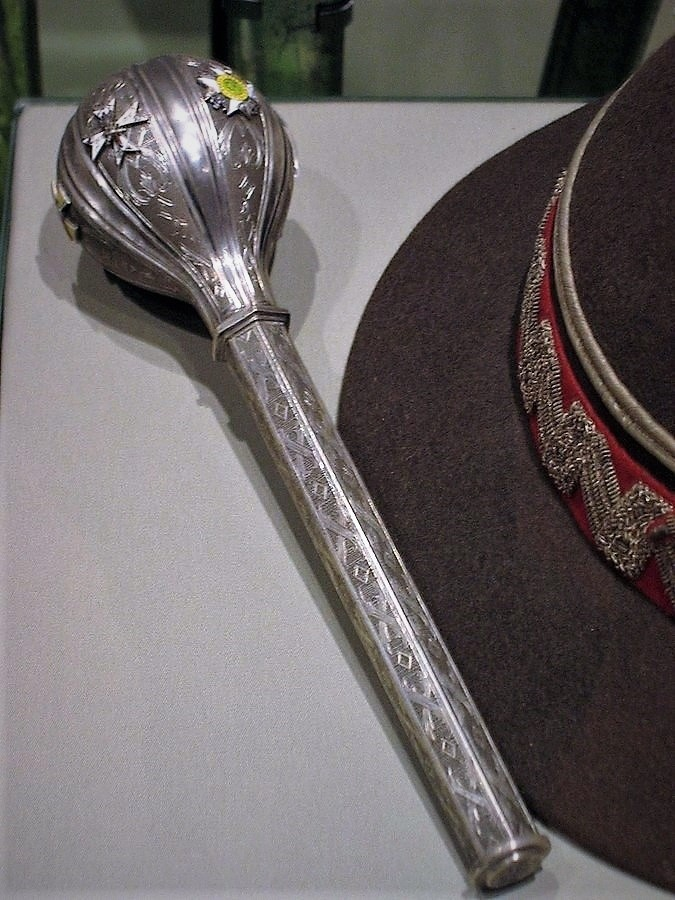
Marshal of Poland mace

Maces are also used as a parade item, rather than a tool of war, notably in military bands. Specific movements of the mace from the drum major will signal specific orders to the band they lead. The mace can signal anything from a step-off to a halt, from the commencement of playing to the cut off.

=== University maces ===
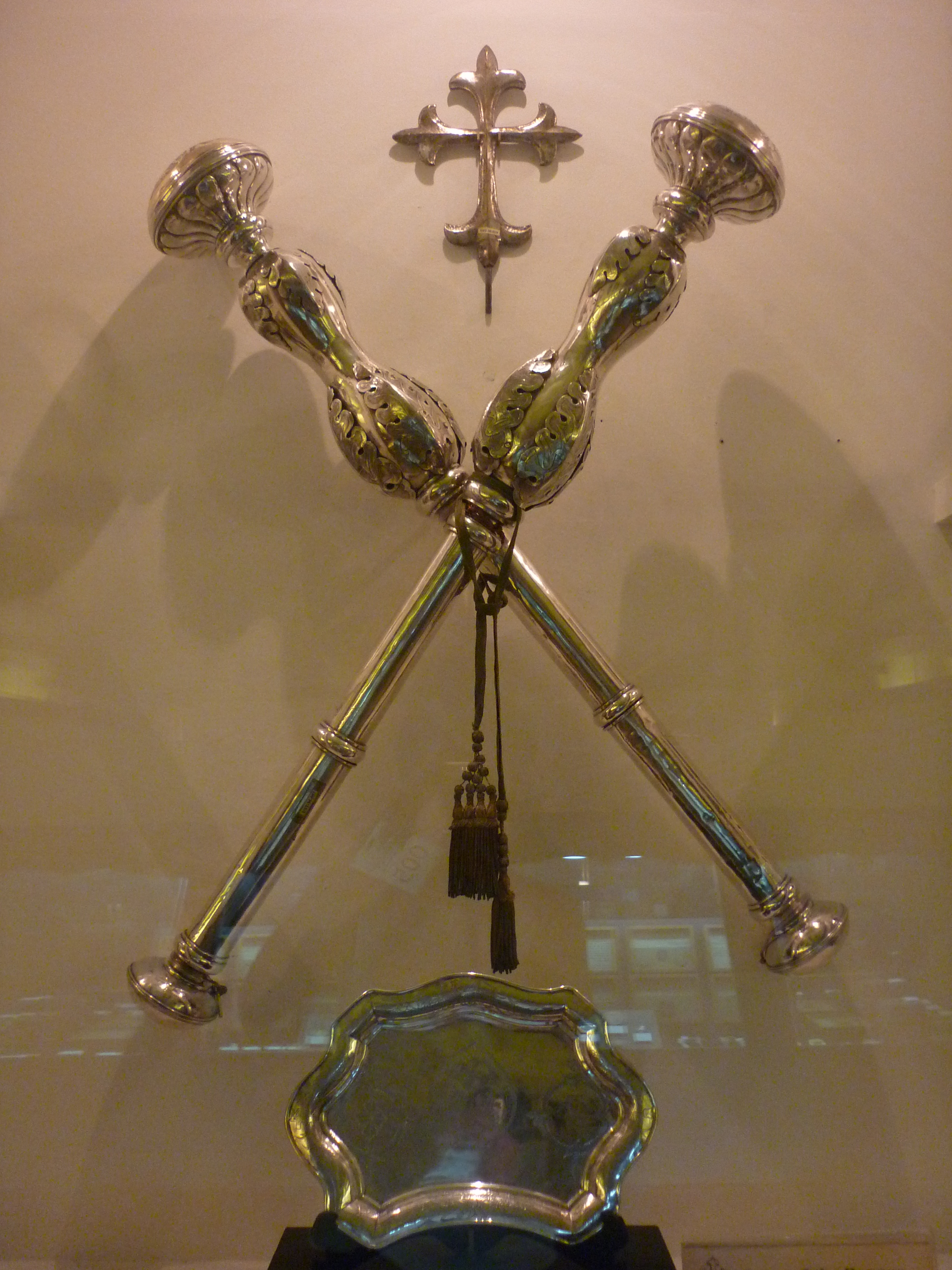
Ceremonial maces of the Rector Magnificus of the University of Santo Tomas in Manila, Philippines.

University maces are employed in a manner similar to parliamentary maces. They symbolize the authority and independence of a chartered university and the authority vested in the provost. They are typically carried in at the beginning of a convocation ceremony and are often less than half a meter high.

== Heraldic use ==
Like many weapons from feudal times, maces have been used in heraldic blazons as either a charge on a shield or other item, or as external ornamentation.

Thus, in France:

- the city of Cognac (in the Charente département): Argent on a horse sable harnessed or a man proper vested azure with a cloak gules holding a mace, on a chief France modern
- the city of Colmar (in Haut-Rhin): per pale gules and vert a mace per bend sinister or. Three maces, probably a canting device (Kolben means mace in German, cfr. Columbaria the Latin name of the city) appear on a 1214 seal. The arms in a 15th-century stained-glass window show the mace per bend on argent.
- the duke of Retz (a pairie created in 1581 for Albert de Gondy) had Or two maces or clubs per saltire sable, bound gules
- the Garde des sceaux ('keeper of the seals', still the formal title of the French Republic's Minister of Justice) places behind the shield, two silver and gilded maces in saltire, and the achievement is surmounted by a mortier (magistrate's hat)

== See also ==
- Barsom
- Bulawa
- Ceremonial maces in the British Isles
- Gada (weapon)
- Flail (weapon)
- Kanabō
- Horseman's pick
- Mace of the United States House of Representatives
- Morning star (weapon)
- Shillelagh (club)
- Tokotoko
- War hammer
- Meteor hammer
- Chuí (Chinese weapon)
