= Christian Remembrancer =

High-church periodical (1819–1868)

The Christian Remembrancer was a high-church periodical which ran from 1819 to 1868. Joshua Watson and Henry Handley Norris, the owners of the British Critic, encouraged Frederick Iremonger to start the Christian Remembrancer as a monthly publication in 1819. Renn Dickson Hampden was briefly editor, 1825–26. In 1841 Francis Garden (1810–1884) and William Scott (1813–1872) became co-editors. In 1844 the magazine was relaunched as a quarterly, with James Mozley briefly succeeding Garden and acting as an editor until 1855.

Contributors to the Christian Remembrancer included John Armstrong, Richard William Church, Charles John Ellicott (1819–1905), Robert Wilson Evans (1789–1866), Philip Freeman (1818–1875), Arthur West Haddan (1816–1873), Walter Farquhar Hook, Anne Mozley, John Mason Neale, John Oxlee (1779–1854), Mark Pattison, Baden Powell, James Seaton Reid (1798–1851), George Williams and Samuel Wix.
