= The Garden =

The Garden or The Gardens may refer to:

== Places ==
=== Sports arenas ===
- Boston Garden, the former (and more famous) home of the Celtics and Bruins
- Cincinnati Gardens, the arena in Cincinnati, Ohio
- Discovery Gardens, a community in Dubai, United Arab Emirates
- Franklin's Gardens, a rugby union stadium for the Northampton Saints
- Madison Square Garden, the arena of the New York Knicks basketball and New York Rangers ice hockey teams
- Maple Leaf Gardens, the arena of the former home of the Toronto Maple Leafs ice hockey team
- TD Garden, the arena of the Boston Celtics basketball and Boston Bruins ice hockey teams

=== Other places ===
- Buckingham Palace Garden, often referred to as The Garden
- Covent Garden, a district of central London
- The Garden (pastoral station), a pastoral station near Alice Springs, Australia
- The Garden Cinema, an independent cinema in Covent Garden, London
- The Gardens, a zone in the locality of St. Julian's, Malta
- The Gardens, Dubai, a community in Dubai, United Arab Emirates
- Gardens, Cape Town, a suburb in Cape Town, South Africa, also known as "The Gardens"
- The Gardens, Johannesburg, a suburb in Johannesburg, South Africa
- The Gardens, Otago, a suburb of Dunedin, New Zealand
- The Gardens, Auckland, a suburb of Manukau City, New Zealand
- The Gardens, Northern Territory, a suburb of Darwin, Australia
- The Gardens, Tasmania, a locality in Australia

== Publications ==
=== Poetry ===
- "The Garden" (poem), a poem by Andrew Marvell
- The Garden, a 1946 poetry collection by Vita Sackville-West
- The Garden, a 1987 poetry collection by Bella Akhmadulina

=== Fiction ===
- "The Garden" (short story), a 1964 short story by Paul Bowles
- "The Garden", a 1980 short story by Patricia Robins, written as Claire Lorrimer
- "The Garden", an illustrated short story in the 1984 anthology book Garfield: His 9 Lives
- The Garden, a 1990 novel by Chaz Brenchley
- The Garden, alternative title of Under the Moon, a 1994 picture book by Dyan Sheldon
- The Garden: Visions of Paradise, a 1994 illustrated book by Gabrielle van Zuylen
- The Garden, a 1997 novel by Carol Matas
- The Garden, a 1997 Star Trek: Voyager novel by Melissa Scott
- The Garden, a 2003 novel by Gillian Linscott
- The Garden, a 2024 novel by Clare Beams
- The Garden (novel), a 2025 novel by Nick Newman

=== Periodicals ===
- The Garden (Royal Horticultural Society), the journal of the British Royal Horticultural Society
- The Garden (journal, 1871–1927), a magazine started in 1871 by William Robinson

== Films ==
- The Garden (1977 film), an Israeli film by Victor Nord
- The Garden (1990 film), a British film by Derek Jarman
- The Garden (1995 film), a Slovak film by Martin Šulík
- The Garden (2006 film), an American drama-horror film
- The Garden (2008 film), a documentary by Scott Hamilton Kennedy
- The Garden (2017 film), a German drama film
- The Garden (2020 film), an Icelandic film by Ragnar Bragason

== Television ==
- "The Garden", an episode of the TV series Pocoyo

== Music ==
- The Garden (band), an experimental rock/post-punk duo from Orange County, California

=== Albums ===
- The Garden (Bran Van 3000 album), 2010
- The Garden (John Foxx album), 1981
- The Garden (Merril Bainbridge album), 1995
- The Garden (Kari Jobe album), 2017
- The Garden (Michael Nesmith album), 1994
- The Garden (Silver Apples album), 1998
- The Garden (Zero 7 album), 2006
- The Garden, an allegorical oratorio by Michael McLean, 1995
- The Garden, 2008 album by Unitopia
- The Garden, 2022 album by Basia Bulat

=== Songs ===
- "The Garden" (Australia Too song), 1985
- "The Garden" (Guns N' Roses song), 1992
- "The Garden" (Take That song), 2009
- "The Garden", a song by Einstürzende Neubauten from the 1996 album Ende Neu
- "The Garden", a song by Five for Fighting from the 1997 album Message for Albert
- "The Garden", a song by the Happy Fits from the 2020 album What Could Be Better
- "The Garden", a song by Rush from the 2012 album Clockwork Angels

== Other uses ==
- "The Garden" (Chowder episode), a 2009 episode of Chowder
- The Garden (television programme), an RTÉ television programme hosted by Barney Johnson from 1977 to 1979
- The Garden (animated series), a Christian animated series created by Butch Hartman
- The Garden, surrounding The House in The Claidi Journals
- The Garden, a restaurant on the top floor of the Joseph Smith Memorial Building in downtown Salt Lake City
- The Garden, a school of philosophy founded by Epicurus c. 306 BCE
- The Garden Company Limited, Hong Kong–based bakery and confectionery manufacturer

== See also ==
- Garden (disambiguation)
- "Garden Song", by David Mallett, 1975
- Hatton Garden, the diamond district of London
- In the Garden (disambiguation)
- Kent, an English county nicknamed "the garden of England"
