= Garden town (disambiguation) =

A garden town is a small environmentally sustainable town in the garden city movement.

Garden Town may also refer to:

- Garden Town, Lahore, a neighbourhood in Punjab, Pakistan

== See also ==
- Garden City (disambiguation)
- Gardenstown, Scotland
- Garden Township (disambiguation)
