= Francis Garden =

Francis Garden may refer to:

- Francis Garden, Lord Gardenstone (1721–1793), Scottish judge, joint Solicitor General for Scotland 1760–64, Lord of Session, 1764–93
- Francis Garden (theologian) (1810–1884), Scottish theologian, editor of the Christian Remembrancer
