= In the Garden =

In the Garden may refer to:

== Albums ==
- In the Garden (Eurythmics album), a 1981 album by the Eurythmics
- In the Garden (EP), a 2007 EP by The Eighties Matchbox B-Line Disaster
- In the Garden (Gypsy album), a 1971 album by Gypsy
- In the Garden, a 2011 album by Ganja White Night
- Coin Coin Chapter Five: In the Garden, 2023 albums by Matana Roberts

== Songs ==
- "In the Garden" (1912 song), a 1912 gospel song by Charles Austin Miles
- "In the Garden" (Van Morrison song), from the 1986 album No Guru, No Method, No Teacher
- "In the Garden", a song by Bob Dylan from the 1980 Saved
