= William Brownie Garden =

Scottish inventor and entrepreneur

William Brownie Garden (December 2, 1869 – 1960) was a Scottish inventor and entrepreneur. He is probably best known for his invention of the "revolving blackboard". Up until his death at age 90, in 1960, the ‘Inventor’ still worked at his own bench in the factory, from which came innovations like an improved saw which cut ten times quicker than any other, and an eight-wheeled car for faster cornering. For relaxation he produced scores of beautifully carved walking sticks, which he presented free to the older townspeople. His mind roamed the entire mechanical firmament. He was a dreamer with the most practical of brains, who, even in his youth, foresaw the future by drawing tentative plans for a vertical take-off aero engine.

‘Wullie Gairden’ as he was known locally had six children, two sons and four daughters of which two sons William and John and daughter Mary joined the firm. As well as being a Master Joiner he was a genius for invention.

== Business ==
William Brownie Garden was a Master Joiner and in 1904 he set up his own joinery business. His company, Wilson & Garden, Ltd., was founded in Kilsyth, Scotland. The main product was the rollerboard.

Wilson & Garden became a limited company in 1923 as ‘Builders and Joiners’. At this time they were also the local undertakers. As the demand for the roller boards increased in the early 1950s the focus of the company switched from property building to the manufacture of the roller boards and by the late 1950s the building side ceased altogether.

The company was taken over by Ultralon Holdings in 2005. In 2008 the company became Spaceright Europe, Ltd.

== Inventions ==
=== Infinitely variable gear box ===
In 1955 he decided that cars didn't need a clutch, a gear lever, or brakes, and took out a provisional patent on what he described as his ‘Infinitely variable gear Box’. Motor engineers, who checked the plans, pronounced the invention foolproof and gave their opinion that it could be mass-produced quite cheaply.

The method was that, on the movement of a lever, the car would glide away from rest to full speed. Moving the lever back would bring the car to a halt, the engine acting as a brake; the lever moved further back would put the car in reverse.

=== Skid proofing vehicles ===
At one time he set his mind to the problem of combating the hazards of driving on icy roads, and patented a device to make vehicles skid proof. It was fitted to one of the firm's Lorries and tried out on the severest of days. It was a complete success, the vehicle just refused to lose adhesion, but having proved his point, his interest waned and the project wasn't pursued. Having successfully solved one problem, he couldn't wait to get to the next.

=== Totalisator ===
Around 1929 another of his inventions was the ‘Totalisator’ for racetracks. This ‘Tote’ was an automatic system for registering bets, and working out the odds on winners according to the extent to which they have been backed. Tickets for bets in variable amounts are issued, and after percentage deductions for expenses, the total sum received is divided among the backers of winning or placed horses, in accordance with the odds offered.

=== Revolving Blackboard ===
Perhaps his most practical invention was the Revolving Surface Writing Board, or rollerboard, in 1911.

Originally instigated by Mr. McCubbin the rector of Kilsyth Academy, who had drawn ‘Wullie Gairden’s attention to the limitations of the old slate blackboard with its necessity for constant cleaning. Small teachers had to stand on boxes to reach the top of the slate board and tall teachers had to stoop to reach the bottom of the board. “Couldn’t you do something about that?” he asked, and the challenge was enough for him.

Using the roller towel principle, and substituting a specially treated fabric for slate, the first of the now internationally known revolving boards was created. The original prototype is still in use today.

The largest board of all is in Oxford University in the Clarendon Laboratory, a giant over 20 feet high.
