= Torture Garden =

Torture Garden may refer to:

- The Torture Garden, novel by Octave Mirbeau
- "The Torture Garden", song by Death in June
- Torture Garden (album), album by Naked City
- Torture Garden (film), film directed by Freddie Francis and written by Robert Bloch
- Torture Garden (fetish club), London fetish nightclub
