= Green Garden Township =

Green Garden Township may refer to:

- Green Garden Township, Will County, Illinois
- Green Garden Township, Ellsworth County, Kansas
