= Garden State =

Garden State may refer to:

== Official state nicknames ==
- New Jersey, U.S.
- Victoria (Australia)

== Arts and entertainment ==
- Garden State (film), a 2004 film by Zach Braff
  - Garden State (soundtrack), the film's soundtrack
- Garden State (novel), a 1991 novel by Rick Moody
- The Garden State, a 1988 short story collection by Gary Krist
- "Garden State", a trance music track which was produced by Airbase
- "Garden State", a post-hardcore music track by Senses Fail

== Other uses ==
- Garden State Parkway, a toll road in New Jersey
- Garden State Discovery Museum, a children's museum in Cherry Hill, New Jersey
- Garden State Life Insurance Company, which was founded in New Jersey but is now headquartered in League City, Texas
- Garden State Plaza, a shopping mall in Paramus, New Jersey
