= Cognac, Charente =

Cognac Cougnat (Poitevin–Saintongeais)
- Subprefecture and commune
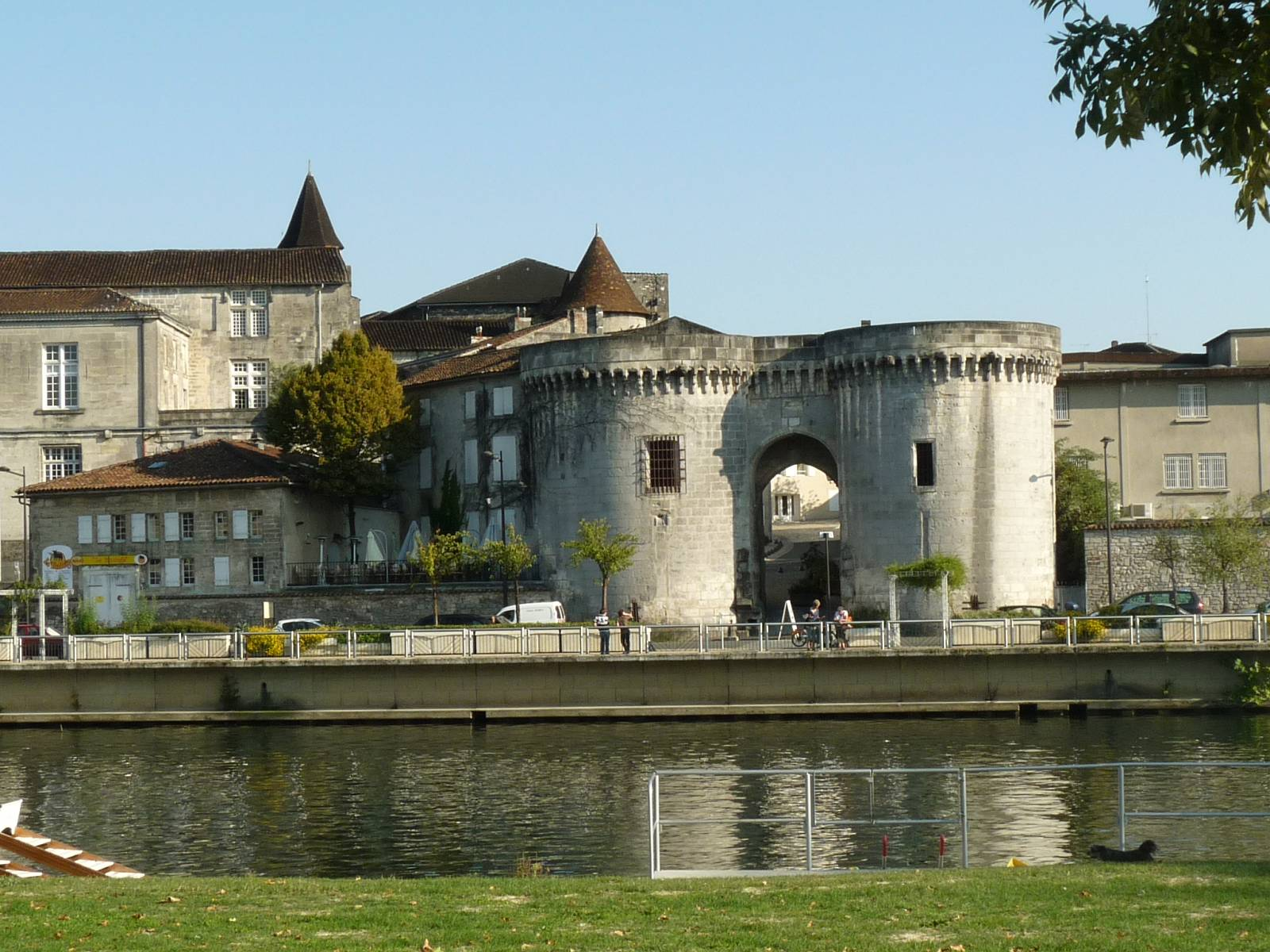
- The Saint-Jacques gate in Cognac

- Coat of arms
- Location of Cognac
- Location within France Location within Nouvelle-Aquitaine
- Coordinates: 45°42′N 0°20′W
- Country: France
- Region: Nouvelle-Aquitaine
- Department: Charente
- Arrondissement: Cognac
- Canton: Cognac-1 and 2
- Intercommunality: CA Grand Cognac

Government
  - Mayor (2020–2026): Morgan Berger
- Area^{1}: 15.5 km^{2} (6.0 sq mi)
- Elevation: 27 m (89 ft)
- Highest elevation: 53 m (174 ft)
- Lowest elevation: 5 m (16 ft)
- Population (2023): 18,532
  - Density: 1,200/km^{2} (3,100/sq mi)
- Time zone: UTC+01:00 (CET)
  - Summer (DST): UTC+02:00 (CEST)
- INSEE/Postal code: 16102 /16100
- ^{1} French Land Register data, which excludes lakes, ponds, glaciers > 1 km^{2} (0.386 sq mi or 247 acres) and river estuaries.

Cognac (French pronunciation: [kɔɲak]; Saintongese: Cougnat; Occitan: Conhac [kuˈɲak]) is a commune in the Charente department, southwestern France. Administratively, the commune of Cognac is a subprefecture of the Charente department.

== Name ==
The name is believed to be formed from an individual masculine name -Connius, a Gallic name, and the suffix -acum, which would correspond to the "domain of Connius".

== History ==
The town of Cognac was unknown before the ninth century, when it was fortified. During the Hundred Years' War, the town continually changed sides, according to the tides of war. In 1526, it lent its name to the War of the League of Cognac, the military alliance established by King Francis I of France to fight against the House of Habsburg. As a benefit of the War League of Cognac, King Francis I granted to the town of Cognac the commercial right to participate in the salt trade conducted along the river Charente, from which regional Cognac developed into a centre for the production of wine and brandy.

In November 1651, Cognac was besieged by rebels led by the Prince de Condé during the 1648-1653 civil war, the "Fronde"; the town was relieved in December by a force under Comte d'Harcourt; afterwards, King Louis XIV granted Cognac additional commercial rights.

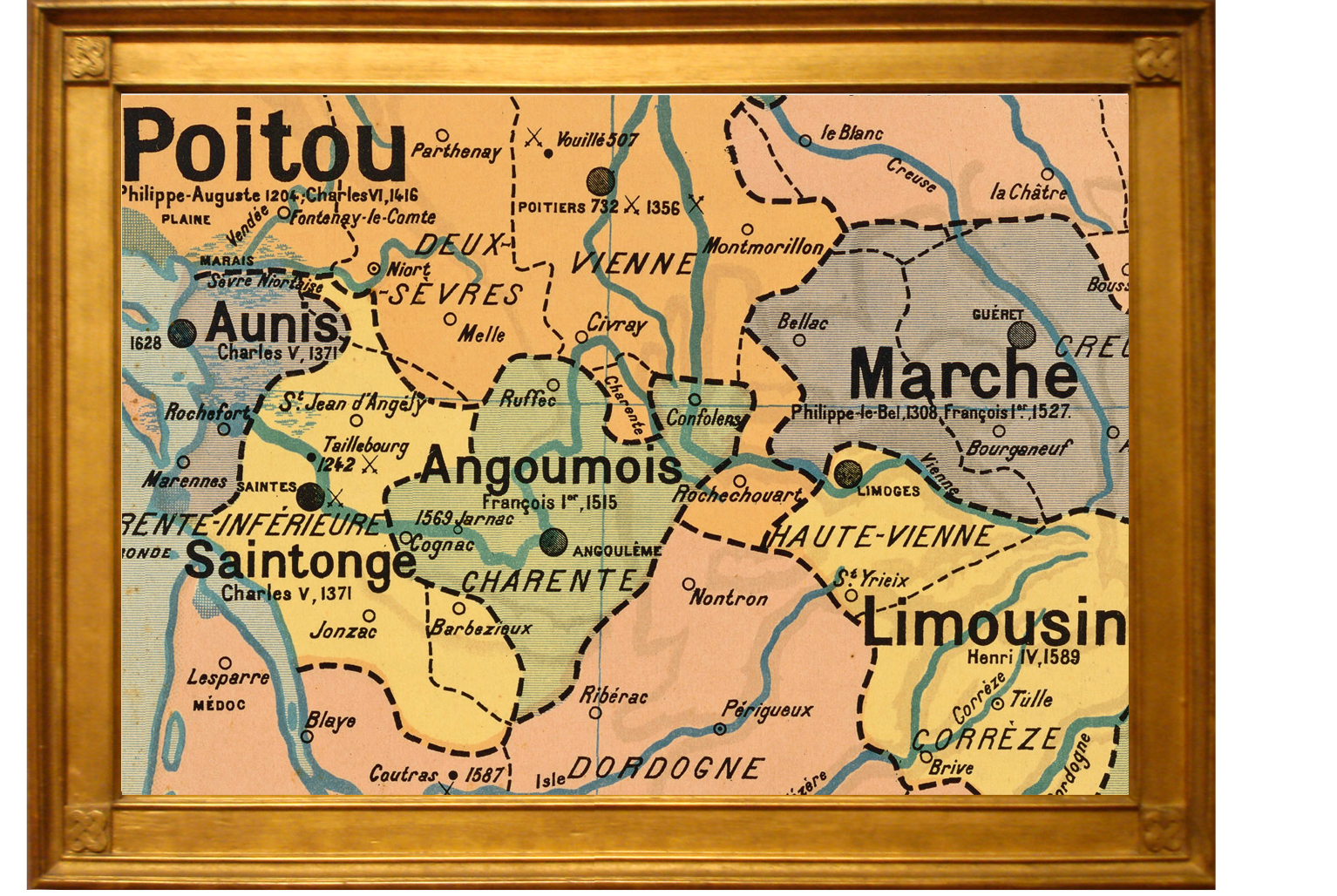
Cognac in province of Angoumois (1789)

Cognac was part of the historic French province of Angoumois. In 1790, following the French Revolution that began the year before, the provinces were abolished and Angoumois became part of the newly created department of Charente.

== Geography ==
Cognac is situated on the river Charente between the towns of Angoulême and Saintes. The greater part of the town has been built on the river's left bank, with the smaller right bank area known as the Saint Jacques district. The town is situated on one of the pilgrimage routes to Santiago de Compostela and is home to the French Air Force training base 709. Cognac is 400 kilometers (250 mi) southwest of Paris.

== Culture ==
The Festival Polar de Cognac has been held each year since 1996. With a focus on crime fiction and thrillers, it showcases and awards prizes to novels, comic books, film, theatre, and television.

== Cognac brandy ==
The town gives its name to one of the world's best-known types of brandy or eau de vie. Cognac must be made in designated areas around the town of Cognac and must be made according to strictly defined regulations to be granted the name Cognac.

Cognac is a unique spirit in that it is double-distilled. This process can be viewed in one of the many "Grande Marque" Cognac houses which all have visitor centres. Most central in the town are Hennessy, Martell, Otard, Camus and Remy Martin. About 15 km (9 mi) east of Cognac is Jarnac, home to Courvoisier.

There are six vineyard areas around the Cognac area, all of which are within the Appellation Controlee for Cognac, but which are considered to vary in quality from the best growth area of "Grande Champagne" (nothing to do with the Champagne wine region in NE France), through "Petite Champagne" then "Borderies", "Fins Bois", "Bon Bois" and finally "Bois Ordinaire". All Cognac is produced by blending a variety of eau de vie which can be made from grapes from different locations, and from different vintages. It is the cellar master's skill that ensures that a brand's Cognac is recognizable regardless of when it is produced, since he can blend multiple eaux de vie to achieve the right taste for his house.

Different qualities of Cognac are produced by all brands, and include VS ("Very Special"); VSOP ("Very Superior [or, more commonly, "Special", though the Bureau National Interprofessionnel du Cognac specifies "Superior"] Old Pale") and XO ("eXtra Old"). (English terms are still used, since in the early days of Cognac production it was the British who were the main consumers and also became some of the main producers of Cognac, using techniques acquired from the distillation of whisky, etc.) These are controlled by the length of time the Cognac is allowed to mature in oak barrels, a minimum time being required at each grade level. The longer the Cognac matures in the barrel the smoother it will generally become. Once it is bottled no further development takes place. Most houses still have barrels of Cognac dating back to the 19th century sitting in their cellars waiting for fine blending by the Cellar Master.

== Climate ==
Cognac has an oceanic climate (Köppen climate classification Cfb). The average annual temperature in Cognac is 13.7 °C (56.7 °F). The average annual rainfall is 771.8 mm (30.39 in) with December the wettest month. Temperatures are highest on average in July and August, at around 21.3 °C (70.3 °F), and lowest in January, at around 6.5 °C (43.7 °F). The highest temperature ever recorded in Cognac was 41.4 °C (106.5 °F) on 11 August 2025, and the coldest temperature ever recorded was −19.4 °C (−2.9 °F) on 15 February 1956.

Climate data for Cognac, elevation: 30 m (98 ft), 1991–2020 normals, extremes 1945–present
Month	Jan	Feb	Mar	Apr	May	Jun	Jul	Aug	Sep	Oct	Nov	Dec	Year
Record high °C (°F)	18.4 (65.1)	24.4 (75.9)	26.2 (79.2)	31.0 (87.8)	34.0 (93.2)	42.7 (108.9)	40.3 (104.5)	41.4 (106.5)	36.8 (98.2)	32.0 (89.6)	24.7 (76.5)	20.5 (68.9)	41.4 (106.5)
Mean daily maximum °C (°F)	9.7 (49.5)	11.3 (52.3)	14.9 (58.8)	17.7 (63.9)	21.3 (70.3)	24.8 (76.6)	27.0 (80.6)	27.3 (81.1)	23.8 (74.8)	19.1 (66.4)	13.5 (56.3)	10.4 (50.7)	18.4 (65.1)
Daily mean °C (°F)	6.5 (43.7)	7.1 (44.8)	10.1 (50.2)	12.5 (54.5)	16.1 (61.0)	19.4 (66.9)	21.3 (70.3)	21.3 (70.3)	18.1 (64.6)	14.6 (58.3)	9.8 (49.6)	7.1 (44.8)	13.7 (56.7)
Mean daily minimum °C (°F)	3.3 (37.9)	3.0 (37.4)	5.2 (41.4)	7.3 (45.1)	10.9 (51.6)	14.0 (57.2)	15.6 (60.1)	15.4 (59.7)	12.5 (54.5)	10.1 (50.2)	6.1 (43.0)	3.7 (38.7)	8.9 (48.0)
Record low °C (°F)	−17.5 (0.5)	−19.4 (−2.9)	−10.2 (13.6)	−4.4 (24.1)	−0.2 (31.6)	3.0 (37.4)	6.4 (43.5)	5.5 (41.9)	2.2 (36.0)	−3.8 (25.2)	−8.4 (16.9)	−14.5 (5.9)	−19.4 (−2.9)
Average precipitation mm (inches)	71.9 (2.83)	50.8 (2.00)	52.9 (2.08)	65.0 (2.56)	61.6 (2.43)	60.2 (2.37)	45.0 (1.77)	53.2 (2.09)	62.8 (2.47)	76.4 (3.01)	87.9 (3.46)	84.1 (3.31)	771.8 (30.39)
Average precipitation days (≥ 1.0 mm)	11.6	9.3	9.8	10.8	10.1	7.8	6.9	6.9	8.3	11.1	12.0	12.1	116.5
Average relative humidity (%)	87	82	76	74	75	72	69	72	76	83	87	88	78
Mean monthly sunshine hours	81.5	115.6	166.0	187.4	221.1	237.2	257.4	249.6	204.3	141.3	96.8	84.6	2,042.6
Source 1: Meteo France
Source 2: Infoclimat.fr (humidity, 1961–1990)

== Population ==
The inhabitants of the town are known in French as Cognaçais.

Historical population

Year	Pop.	±% p.a.
1793	2,846	—
1800	2,827	−0.10%
1806	3,134	+1.73%
1821	2,947	−0.41%
1831	3,409	+1.47%
1841	4,118	+1.91%
1846	4,947	+3.74%
1851	5,835	+3.36%
1856	7,085	+3.96%
1861	8,167	+2.88%
1866	9,412	+2.88%
1872	13,677	+6.43%
1876	14,900	+2.16%
1881	14,087	−1.12%
1886	15,200	+1.53%
1891	17,392	+2.73%
1896	20,228	+3.07%
1901	19,483	−0.75%

Year	Pop.	±% p.a.
1906	19,469	−0.01%
1911	19,188	−0.29%
1921	18,876	−0.16%
1926	17,452	−1.56%
1931	17,404	−0.06%
1936	16,305	−1.30%
1946	17,479	+0.70%
1954	19,026	+1.07%
1962	20,798	+1.12%
1968	22,062	+0.99%
1975	22,237	+0.11%
1982	20,660	−1.05%
1990	19,528	−0.70%
1999	19,534	+0.00%
2007	19,243	−0.19%
2012	18,626	−0.65%
2017	18,825	+0.21%
2023	18,532	−0.26%

Source: EHESS and INSEE (1968-2023)

== Landmarks ==
- The Old Town. The town's medieval quarter "Vieux Cognac" runs from the Tours Saint-Jacques, alongside the river, up to the Saint-Léger church. The area contains many unusual buildings, built between the 15th and 18th centuries, situated on narrow cobbled streets. Many contain sculptures of the salamander, the symbol of King François I, as well as gargoyles and richly decorated façades.
- The Château des Valois, an important medieval trading post.
- The Saint-Léger church. Church Exterior
- The musée d'Art et d'Histoire (art and history museum)
- The musée des arts du Cognac (art museum)
- The Saint-Gobain glassworks and barrelworks
- Cognac Public Garden

== Notable people ==
- The botanist Pierre Boiteau (1911–1980) was born in Cognac
- The glassmaker Claude Boucher, inventor of the glass-blowing machine in around 1880, lived and worked in Cognac
- The car manufacturer Louis Delâge was born in Cognac in 1874
- Francis I (king of France between 1515 and 1547) was born in the town's castle in 1494. The town's main square is named after him and a statue of the king, on horseback over his enemies, stands at the centre.
- Paul-Émile Lecoq de Boisbaudran, born in Cognac in 1838, discovered the elements Gallium in 1875 and Samarium in 1878
- Jean Monnet, one of the founding fathers of the European Union, was born in Cognac in 1888 and ran the Monnet Cognac family-controlled enterprise in the 1920s
- The French adult film star and model François Sagat was born in Cognac.
- The French poet Octavien de Saint-Gelais was born in Cognac in 1468.

== Sport ==
- US Cognac is the city's rugby union team.
- Cognac was the start of Stage 19 in the 2007 Tour de France.

== Twin towns—sister cities ==
Cognac is twinned with:

- Boala, Burkina Faso
- Bozhou, China
- Denison, United States
- Jarosław, Poland
- Königswinter, Germany
- Malcesine, Italy
- Nzérékoré, Guinea
- (United Kingdom) Perth, Scotland, UK
- Pisco, Peru
- Qabatiya, Palestine
- Tiberias, Israel
- Tovuz, Azerbaijan
- Valdepeñas, Spain

== Gallery ==
The Musée des arts du Cognac

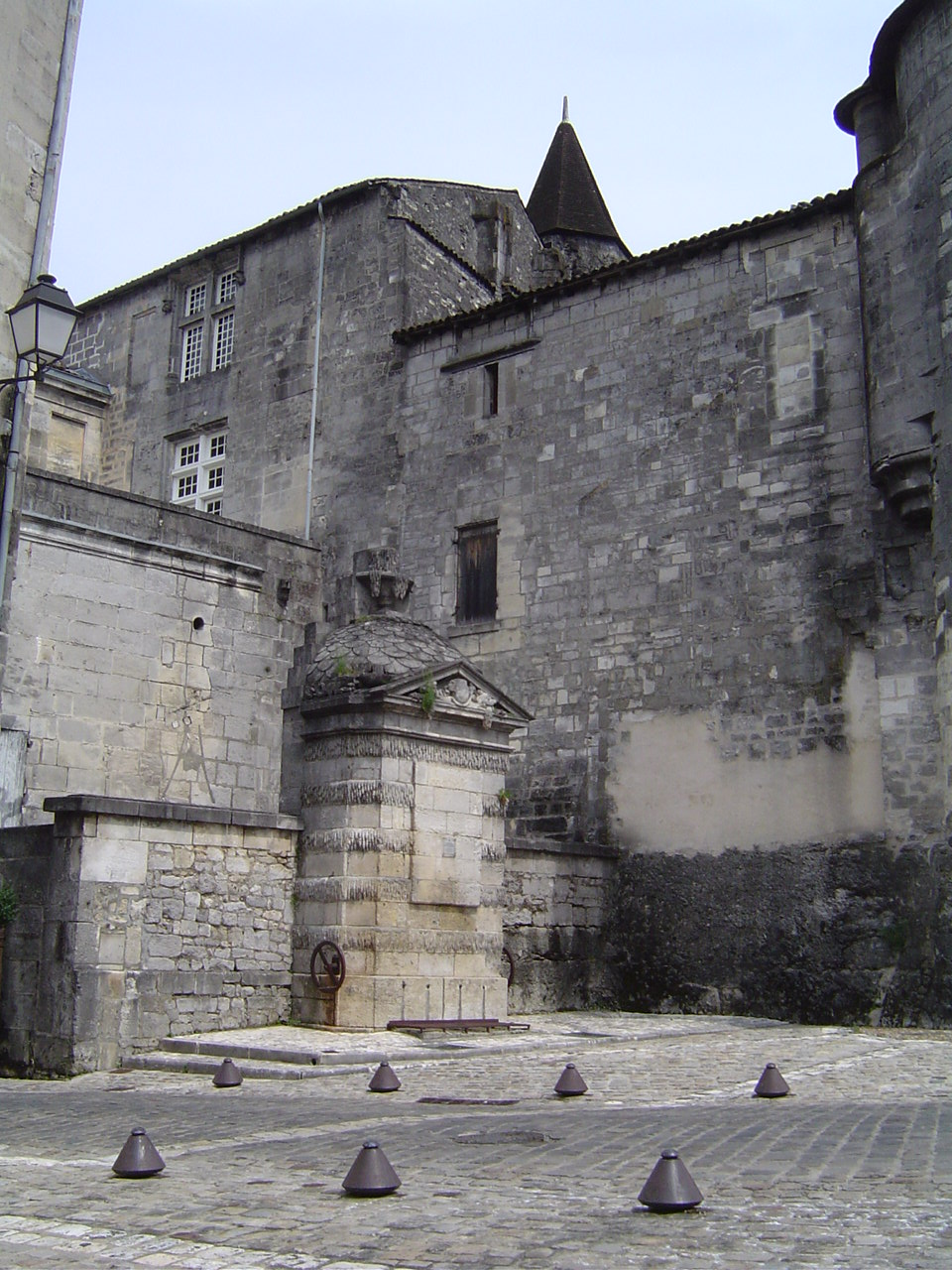
The Château des Valois

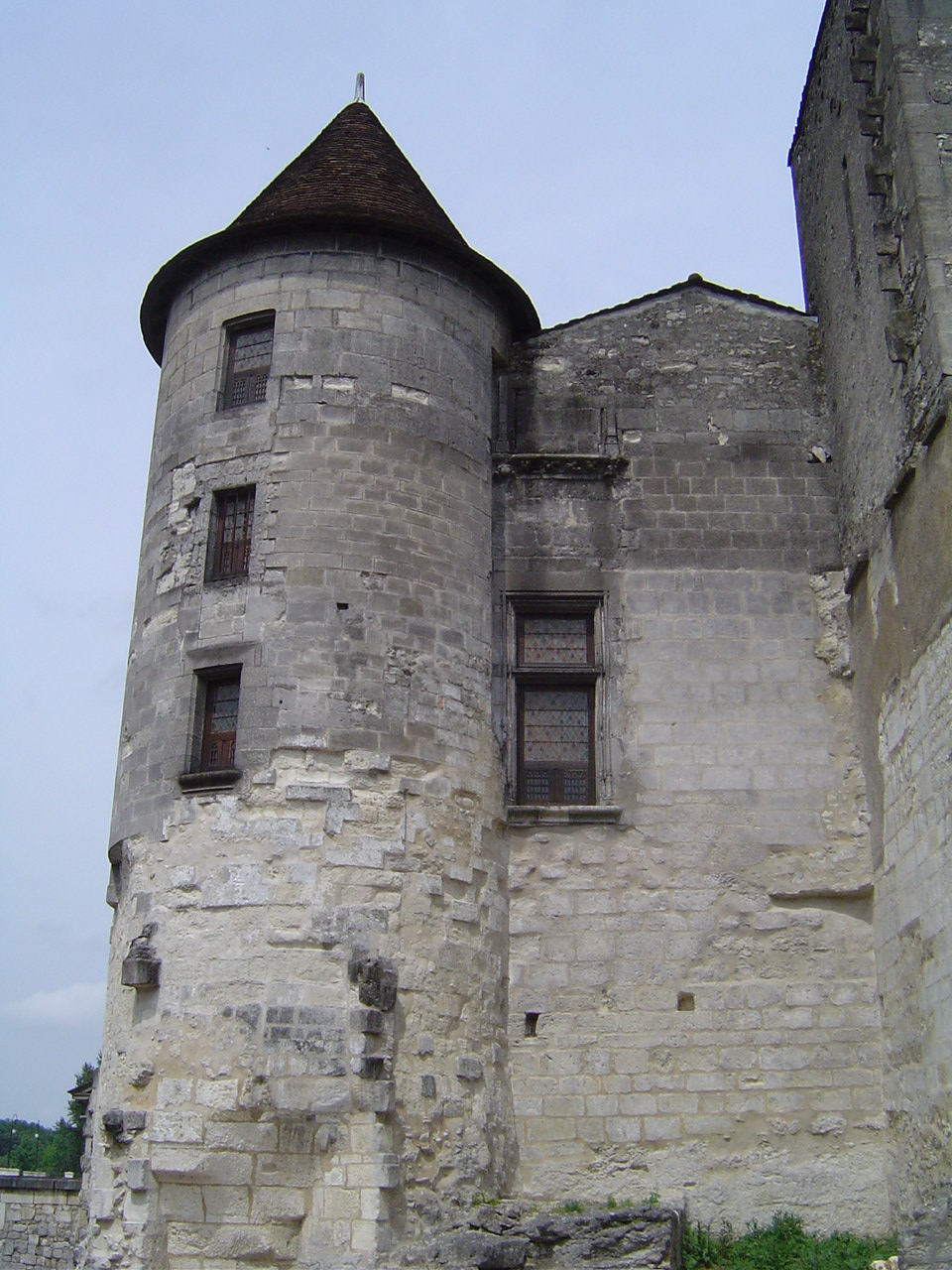
The Château des Valois

== See also ==
- The Coniacian Age of the Cretaceous Period of geological time is named for the city of Cognac
- Communes of the Charente department
