= Cognac Public Garden =

Public park in Cognac, France

Coordinates: 45.6974°N 0.3256°W

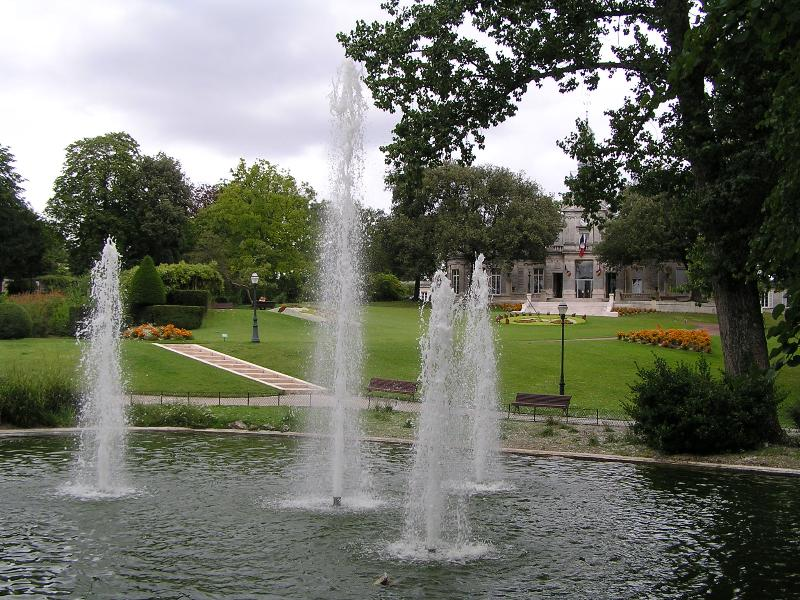
Cognac Public Garden

Cognac Public Garden (French: Le jardin public de Cognac) is located in of the heart of the town of Cognac in the departement of Charente, France. It is one of the few English-styled gardens in France open to the general public. The park is the result of the marriage of the gardens of two adjoining properties; it houses the Hotel de Ville (Town Hall) and the Museum of Art and History.

== History ==
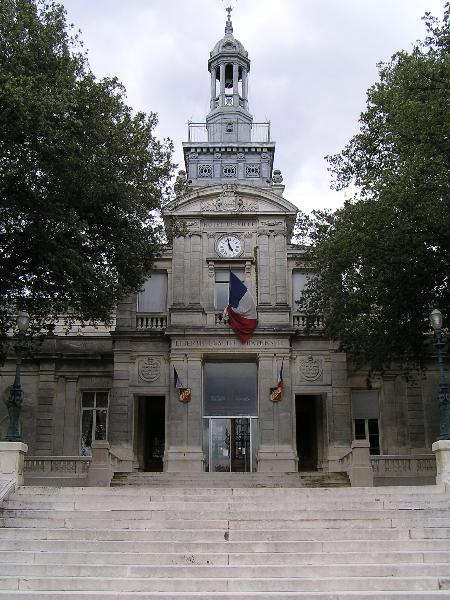
l'hôtel Otard de la Grange

The mansion known as Otard La Grange was purchased by the commune in 1889, and the Hotel de Ville was installed there in 1892. In the meantime architect Alfred Leroux redeveloped the building and added a bell tower and monumental staircase, whilst landscape architect Édouard André redesigned the park into a sunken garden and added several water features.

In 1921, the Dupuy d'Angeac mansion was purchased and turned into the museum based on designs by Antoine Raymond Clavery. He also created a natural amphitheatre by taking advantage of the natural undulation of the landscape and joined the two gardens together. He retained the style of Edouard Andre, albeit with narrow alleyways and no further major prospect. In 1944, the garden was partially classified as a monument historique.

The great storm of December 1999 resulted in the destruction of 288 trees out of 720. The opportunity was taken to rehabilitate the garden under the direction of landscape architect Jean-François Galinette, who based his designs on those of Clavery and André.

== Description ==
The park occupies an area of seven hectares. From the main entrance the view extends over a broad perspective towards the monumental staircase of the Hotel de Ville. On the right, ducks and swans swim in the water below; a continuation of a maze of landscaped rivers and waterfalls.
