= Francis Garden (theologian) =

Scottish theologian and religious author

Francis Garden FRSE (1810–1884) was a Scottish theologian and religious author. He was ordained as a priest in the Church of England, with some of his ministry in the Scottish Episcopal Church and in the Anglican church in Rome.

== Early life ==
Francis Garden was born on 10 December 1810, the son of Alexander Garden (b. 1786), a Glasgow merchant, and Rebecca, second daughter of Henry Monteith, Esq., of Carstairs. After home-tutoring, in 1825 he matriculated at Glasgow University with his younger uncle, Robert Monteith. In 1828 both Francis and Robert entered Trinity College, Cambridge, where Francis took his degree of B.A. in 1833 and M.A. in 1836. In 1832 he was awarded the Hulsean prize for an essay on ‘The advantages which have resulted from the Christian religion being conveyed in a narrative rather than a didactic form'.

At Cambridge Garden (with Monteith) was elected to the Cambridge Apostles, joining the set of which Richard Chenevix Trench, F. D. Maurice, and John Sterling were among the leaders, whose intimate friendship, together with that of Edmund Lushington and George Stovin Venables, he enjoyed. His name occurs frequently in Trench's early letters (Memorials, i. 118, 182, 186, 236, &c.), and he was Trench's companion in Rome and its environs in January 1835.

== Career ==
It is not clear whether Francis Garden had been a member of the Scottish Episcopal Church in Glasgow, or became an Anglican after his arrival in Cambridge. He was ordained a deacon, then a priest in 1836 and originally served briefly in London, before gaining a post as curate to the Rev Sir Herbert Oakeley at Bocking in Essex. In 1838–9 he was curate to the Rev Julius Charles Hare at Hurstmonceaux in Sussex, succeeding after an interval his friend Sterling. There was hardly sufficient sympathy between Garden and Hare for him to stay long as his curate, and he removed in 1839 to the curacy of St James's Church, Piccadilly, then became the incumbent of Holy Trinity Church, Blackheath Hill (1840–4).

On his departure from Blackheath Hill, Garden returned to Scotland for a few years to be assistant incumbent to Charles Terrot, the Bishop of Edinburgh, at St Paul's Episcopal Church, York Place, Edinburgh. After leaving Scotland, for the next few years he was associated with St Stephen's Church, Rochester Row, Westminster, and the English Chapel at Rome.

His final role (1859 until his death) was as Sub-Dean of the Chapels Royal, the Dean being the Bishop of London. On the title page of his book 'An Outline of Logic', published in 1867, Garden described himself as 'Sub-Dean of Her Majesty's Chapels Royal; Chaplain to the Household in St James's Palace; and Professor of Mental and Moral Science, Queen's College, London.'

In 1848 he was elected a fellow of the Royal Society of Edinburgh his proposer being Charles Terrot

Garden died on 10 May 1884, a few weeks after the death of his uncle Robert Monteith. After a funeral at St Andrew's Church, Ashley Place, Westminster (a service led by the Rev Thomas Helmore and the vicar of the parish, Rev. Henry Salwey), he was interred in the same grave has second wife, in the churchyard of Beaminster in Dorset.

== Publications ==
In 1841 he undertook the editorship of the Christian Remembrancer, which he retained for some years.

In his earlier years Garden attached himself to the Oxford school, which was then exercising a powerful attraction over thoughtful minds. Trench describes a sermon he heard him preach in 1839 on ‘the anger of God,’ as ‘Newmanite and in parts very unpleasant.’ He subsequently became somewhat of a broad churchman, adopting the teaching of F. D. Maurice on the incarnation, the atonement, and other chief Christian doctrines, and contributing several thoughtful essays to the series of ‘Tracts for Priests and People,’ a literary organ of that school. The bent of his mind was essentially philosophical, disinclined to rest in any bare dogmatic statements without probing them to the bottom to discover the intellectual basis on which they rested.

In 1844 he published ‘Discourses on Heavenly Knowledge and Heavenly Love,’ followed in 1853 by ‘Lectures on the Beatitudes.’ A pamphlet on the renunciation of holy orders, then beginning to be debated, appeared in 1870 under the title ‘Can an Ordained Man become a Layman?’

‘An Outline of Logic’ was issued in 1867, which came to a second edition in 1871. He was also the author of ‘A Dictionary of English Philosophical Terms,’ 1878; ‘The Nature and Benefits of Holy Baptism;’ ‘The Atonement as a Fact and as a Theory.’ He was a contributor to Smith's Dictionary of the Bible the Christian Remembrancer, The Contemporary Review and other periodicals.

== Family ==
In 1838, Francis Garden married Virginia Dobbie, the third daughter of the late Captain W. H. Dobbie, R.N. of Saling Hall, Great Saling, Essex. The only child of the marriage was a daughter, Christina Cameron Garden, born in 1840. Garden's wife died in Paris in 1852. In 1860, Christina married James Arbuthnot Goldingham, but she died the following year shortly after giving birth to a daughter, who survived.

A year after the death of his daughter, Garden married a widow, Georgiana Jemima Maria Collings, daughter of R. J. Bourchier, of Brook Lodge, Beaminster, Dorset. Georgiana would die in 1868 in Geneva, aged 45. The executors Garden appointed to administer his sizeable estate were relatives of his two wives.
