= Queen Elizabeth's High School =

Mixed grammar school in Gainsborough, Lincolnshire, England

- The school coat of arms

Location
- Morton Terrace; Gainsborough, Lincolnshire, DN21 2ST; England
- Coordinates: 53.410664°N 0.777519°W

Information
- Type: Community grammar school
- Motto: Tradition, Achievement, Opportunity
- Established: 1589; 437 years ago 1983 (merger)
- Founder: Sir Robert Somerscale
- Local authority: Lincolnshire
- Department for Education URN: 120655 Tables
- Ofsted: Reports
- Chairman of the Governors: D. S. Holmes
- Headmaster: Richard Eastham
- Staff: c. 100 teaching, 28 support
- Gender: Co-educational
- Age: 11 to 18
- Enrolment: c. 1200
- Houses: Austen, Brunel, Churchill, Darwin, Elgar and Scott
- Colours: Austen (Gold), Brunel (Purple), Blue (Churchill), Darwin (Green), Elgar (Red), Scott (Silver)
- Publication: The Q.E. News
- Former Pupils: Old Gainians
- Website: http://qehs.lincs.sch.uk

Queen Elizabeth's High School is a co-educational grammar school in Gainsborough, Lincolnshire, England. The school, established in 1983, but with a timeline to 1589, is an amalgamation of the previous Gainsborough High School and Queen Elizabeth's Grammar School.

== History ==
Although the details are unclear, Gainsborough appears to have had a small grammar school from the 15th century provided by the local clergy. Claims have been made that several of the Pilgrim Fathers received their early education in the school and among its alumni was John Robinson and John Smyth; there is no known historical evidence to support this claim, which was based on the mistaken assumption that there were no other grammar schools in the area. Lessons were first held in a room above the porch of the original All Saints church.

In 1589 Queen Elizabeth I granted a charter to Sir Robert Somerscale to establish Queen Elizabeth's Grammar School for boys, with the express purpose of providing an education in the classics and divinity for the sons of the emerging middle class in the town. In 1828, the Chartist poet Thomas Cooper sought to set up a rival grammar school, but failed, and saw his school absorbed by Queen Elizabeth's Grammar School.

From 1795 until 1940 Queen Elizabeth's Grammar School was located on Cox's Hill, at what is now the Hickman Hill Hotel. An equivalent grammar school for girls, Gainsborough High School, was founded in 1920. In 1940 both schools moved to the present Morton Terrace site, on which the local technical college was also based. Under the Tripartite System they became fully state grammar schools, having been fee-paying before then. The schools merged to form Queen Elizabeth's High School in 1982. Before amalgamation Queen Elizabeth's Grammar School had 4 houses: Cox (red), Elliott (white), Hickman (Blue) and Marshall (green).

On 7 December 2012, the school was host to the BBC Radio 4 show Any Questions?, which was held in the Upper School Hall.

In 2013, following a lack of funding which affected most Grammar Schools, a £2 million grant from the Local Authority and a £500,000 grant from central government was given in order to expand and renovate the school. This enabled the construction of a new sports hall, a two-storey teaching block and the refurbishment of College House.

On 7 March 2014 the Sixth Form Centre was relocated to the 1872-built College House building, as the previous centre had become crowded

=== Admissions from neighbouring counties ===
By 1986 10% of admissions came from Nottinghamshire; the wrong side of the River Trent. By 1988, seven in the first form were from Scunthorpe, described as a 'brain drain'. Scunthorpe's comprehensive schools were not popular. Scunthorpe parents also chose the secondary school in Epworth, Lincolnshire.

== Admissions ==
The school annually admits 180 students into Year 7 and 125 into Year 12; around 1000 students make up the lower school (of those aged 11–16) and another 250 make up the sixth-form (16–18). Approximately 700 of those attending are girls and 500 are boys. A number of external pupils are also admitted to the sixth-form each year.

== Curriculum ==
Pupils at Queen Elizabeth's High School usually take ten or eleven GCSE examinations in Year Eleven, and dependent on satisfactory grades can enter the sixth-form to take four A-Level qualifications.

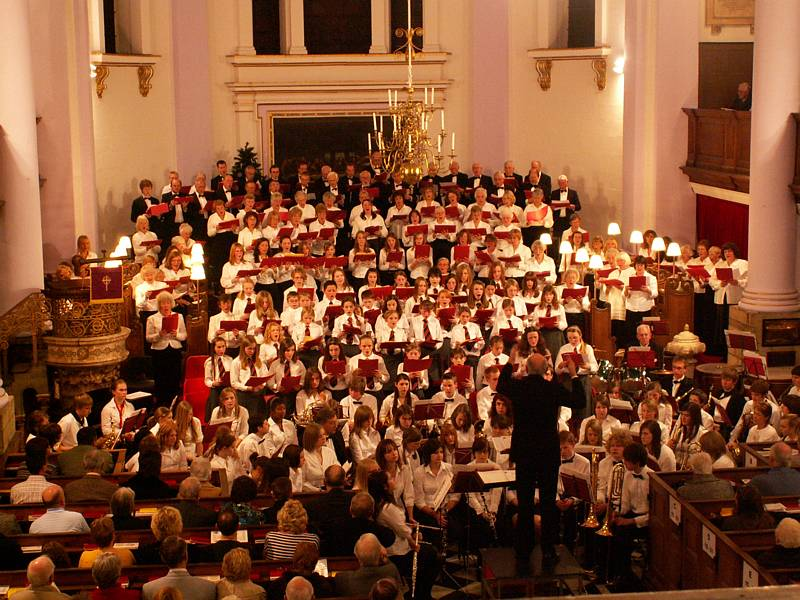
Members of Queen Elizabeth's High School and Gainsborough Choral Society perform in an annual Christmas carol concert, "Carols for All." Phillip Ainsworth (previous Head of Music) conducts.

Music is historically important to QEHS, with the Anglican choral composer W. Stanley Vann being head of Music during the 1930s. Recent drama productions have included Return to the Forbidden Planet, Godspell and Disco Inferno.

== Extracurricular activities ==
Cricket, rugby, football, and athletics are the main boys' sports, and hockey, netball, tennis and athletics the main girls' sports.

Inter-school matches are played against other grammar schools in Lincolnshire, and a few public schools and secondary modern schools.

Debating teams have won local competitions, including the Youth Speaks Competition, and have competed in a national competition.

== Ofsted inspections and school performance ==
An Ofsted inspection in 2006 described the school as "outstanding". The 2021 inspection however described the school as "requires improvement".

League tables for Lincolnshire released by the BBC rate Queen Elizabeth's High School overall 10th: ratings based on English Baccalaureate results place the school joint ninth, for A/AS-level points per pupil third, and adjusted for Value Added nineteenth. The BBC A-Level league tables rank the school second best in Lincolnshire.

== Headteachers ==
- E. W. Lockwood, 1940
- L. A. Hopkins, 1944 until March 1950, when became the head of Sir John Deane's Grammar School, Northwich until 1973, he returned on Saturday 2 July 1960, and Saturday 27 June 1970
- Lawrence Henry Cawte (1910–97), January 1951, aged 40, a senior history teacher of the King Edward Grammar School, Lichfield, educated at Colfe's School
- Tom Bowker, January 1971 until 1976, a Cambridge-educated Maths teacher at Rydal Penrhos and a Methodist lay preacher, he had taught from 1953 at West Monmouth Grammar School; his wife Jean Kathleen Bowker, also a teacher, was a Liberal councillor on Gainsborough Urban District; he was later head of Kettering Boys' School from 1976 to March 1989
- Fred Pape, 1977 to July 1995, he had been the head of a school in Colombia
- John Child

=== Girls High School ===
- Miss M. Squire, 1968
- Kathleen Simpson, 1970s

== Old Gainians ==
Former pupils are known as Old Gainians (O.G.s). Despite their inclusion in the list below, there is no historical evidence that John Smyth or John Robinson attended Gainsborough Grammar School; there is also known to have been a grammar school in their home village of Sturton le Steeple at that time.

=== Academia and science ===
- Nicholas Atkin – Professor of Modern European History, University of Reading; historical biographer and author
- Brian Berry – human geographer, Lloyd Viel Berkner Regental Professor and Dean of the School of Economic, Political and Policy Sciences at the University of Texas at Dallas
- Edward William Binney; FRS – 19th century solicitor, geologist and palaeontologist.
- Sir Halford Mackinder – British geographer and one of the founding fathers of both geopolitics and geostrategy, Scottish Unionist Party MP and one of the founders of the London School of Economics
- Sir George Rolleston; FRCP, FRS – 19th century British physician and zoologist, Linacre Professor of Anatomy and Physiology at Oxford, evolutionary theorist.
- Robert Smith – mathematician and music theorist, master of Trinity College, Cambridge, Plumian Professor of Astronomy and Experimental Philosophy

=== Arts ===
- Jason Carter – actor, best known for his appearances in sci-fi series Babylon 5
- Julia Deakin – actress, known for Holby City, Coronation Street, Hot Fuzz and Shaun of the Dead
- Marina Lewycka – novelist, author of A Short History of Tractors in Ukrainian
- Stanley Vann – Head of Music (1933–39), Anglican choral composer and organist

=== Public Service ===
- Angus Innes – Australian Liberal politician

=== Religion ===
- Hanserd Knollys – Head Master (c.1616–20), Puritan Particular Baptist preacher and clergyman.
- James Bowling Mozley – Anglican clergyman, theologian, Oxford Movement chronicler and Regius Professor of Divinity at the University of Oxford
- Thomas Mozley – Anglican clergyman and Anglo-Catholic theologian
- Edward Rainbowe; DD – 17th century Anglican bishop of Carlisle, Puritan writer, Master of Magdalene College, Cambridge and Vice-Chancellor of Cambridge University
- John Robinson – Puritan Congregationalist, Calvinist theologian and polemicist, and pastor to the Pilgrim Fathers
- John Smyth – Puritan pastor and founder of the Baptist movement

=== Sport ===
- Peter Atkinson – county cricketer for Worcestershire and Northumberland
- Charles Booth – amateur soccer player with Wolverhampton Wanderers (1889–91) and Arsenal (1892–94)
- Harry Davies – professional soccer player with Stoke City (1922–29, 1932–38) and Huddersfield Town (1930–32), sports journalist
- John Hargreaves – minor county and List A cricketer for Suffolk (1963–1981)
- Mervyn Winfield – county cricketer for Nottinghamshire (1954–66) and Lincolnshire (1970–71)

== See also ==
- Eleven-plus
- Gainsborough, Lincolnshire
- Grammar School (general)
