= Rex Woods =

Rex Woods may refer to:

- Rex Woods (artist) (1903–1987), English-born Canadian artist and illustrator
- Rex Woods (athlete) (1891–1986), British athlete

== See also ==
- Rex Wood (1909–1970), South Australian artist in Portugal
