= Frederick Penny =

Frederick Penny may refer to:

- Frederick George Penny, 1st Viscount Marchwood (1876–1955), British politician
- Frederick David Linley Penny (1896–1978), English organist
