= Joseph Sortain =

British nonconformist minister and biographer

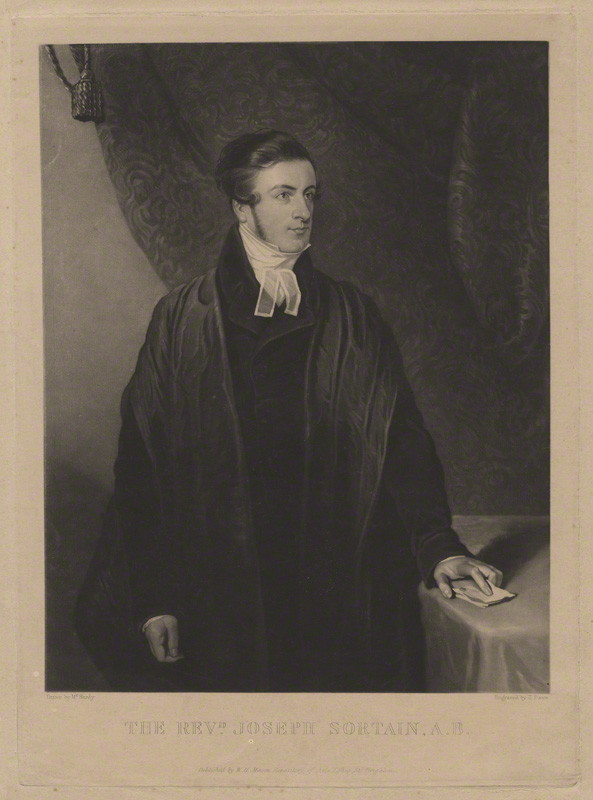
Joseph Sortain, engraving by Henry Edward Dawe

Joseph Sortain (1809–1860) was a British nonconformist minister, an evangelical Independent, philosophy tutor at Cheshunt College, and biographer of Francis Bacon. A reputed preacher of his time, he was called "the Dickens of the pulpit" by John Ross Dix.

== Life ==
He was born in Clifton, Bristol; his father was a baker of Huguenot descent. His parents were in the congregation of James Sherman. This chapel was in the Countess of Huntingdon's Connexion derived from the Calvinistic Methodists. In 1823 the congregation came under William Lucy, and shortly migrated to the Lodge Street Chapel.

Sortain attended the Bristol Baptist Academy when still young (around 1824); at this period he won an essay prize, in a competition for which Lucy was his sponsor, on the topic Christ's Mission. Reading Micaiah Towgood dissuaded him from going to the University of Cambridge. He then studied at Cheshunt College, and Trinity College, Dublin. He returned to Cheshunt College as a tutor, from 1838 to 1850. Under the initial arrangement he taught mathematics, logic, and belles lettres, for two periods of six weeks in a year.

From 1832 Sortain was the Countess of Huntingdon's preacher at her North Street Chapel in Brighton, where he was admired as an orator, and noted for not exceeding 30 minutes. He held to the dissenting position of his family, though he was known not to differ much from Anglican theological positions. Henry Crabb Robinson appreciated Sortain as a preacher, while thinking Frederick William Robertson ("Robertson of Brighton") would rival him.

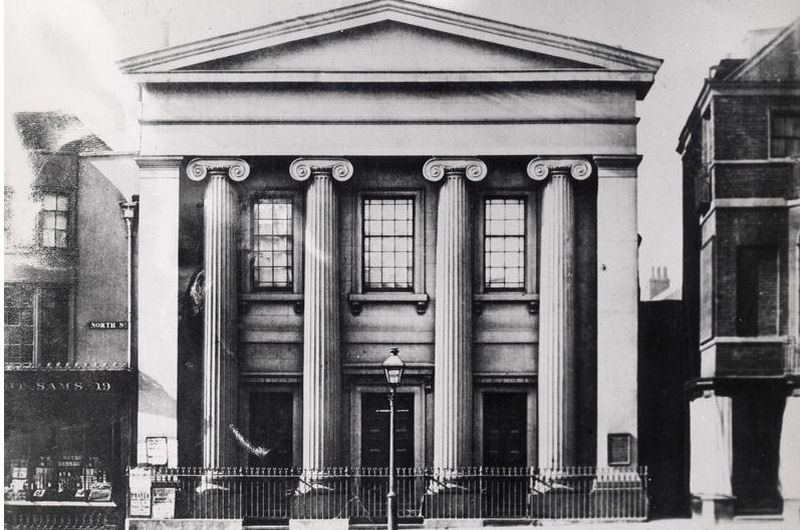
The North Street Chapel in Brighton

Sortain died on 16 July 1860. His funeral sermon was given by his friend Richard Alliott at the North Street Chapel. His reputation lapsed, and he could be called a "forgotten Bristol celebrity" by 1907.

== Works ==
Sortain was a reviewer during the mid-1830s. He obtained work for the High Church British Critic, through contacts with the Rev. Richard Harvey of Hornsey, and James Shergold Boone. He wrote also for the Edinburgh Review, at the suggestion of William Empson. These articles of the mid-1830s were anonymous, but attributions to Sortain have been made, for topics such as Brougham on natural theology, Coleridge, Charles Lyell on geology, and Mary Somerville's Connection of the Physical Sciences in the British Critic. In the Edinburgh Review topics were Richard Baxter, Thomas Lathbury's History of English Episcopacy, and Jeremy Bentham's Deontology (he thought Bentham's works brought on "mental nausea"). Harvey, however, seemed to find Sortain's oratory incomprehensible.

Sortain wrote A Lecture Introductory to the Study of Philosophy (1839) as a Cheshunt College tutor. He published Romanism and Anglo-Catholicism (1841); at this time he was preaching on Antichrist. The Eclectic Review noticed this work with one by Charles Pettit McIlvaine, as anti-Tractarian, though giving it little space, and regretting the "declamatory" style, while praising the content. His Life of Francis, Lord Bacon was published by the Religious Tract Society in 1851.

Sortain wrote novels, as well as theological and philosophical works:

- Hildebrand and the Excommunicated Emperor (1852)
- Count Arensberg; or, The days of Martin Luther (1853).

== Family ==
Sortain married Bridget Margaret, daughter of Sir Patrick Macgregor, 1st Baronet. She published Memorials of the Rev. Joseph Sortain in 1861.

His brother was Dr James Cornish Sortain M.D., a well known planter in Batticaloa, Ceylon, medical physician and philanthropist. He was intimately connected with the first systematic cultivation of the coconuts on the island in the early 1840s. This took place 5 miles from the town of Batticaloa, beside the lake. The 640 acres (260 ha) estate was known as Tannamunai. After Sortain's death, ownership passed to his wife, Eleanor Burleigh Atherton, eldest daughter of Robert Atherton.
