= Gainsborough Town Hall =

Municipal building in Gainsborough, Lincolnshire, England

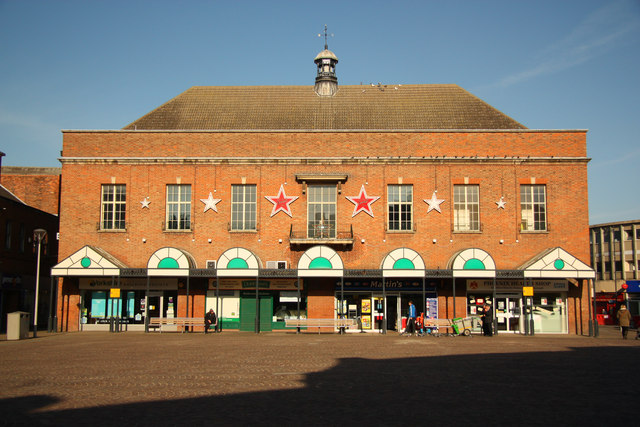
- The main frontage of Gainsborough Town Hall in 2013

- Shown in Lincolnshire
- 53.3997°N 0.7760°W
- Location: Market Place, Gainsborough

History
- Built: 1892

Site notes
- Architect(s): Meeke and Bramall
- Architectural style: Italianate style

Gainsborough Town Hall is a municipal building in the Market Place in Gainsborough, Lincolnshire, England. The town hall was the headquarters of Gainsborough Urban District Council and now serves as a local entertainment venue.

== History ==
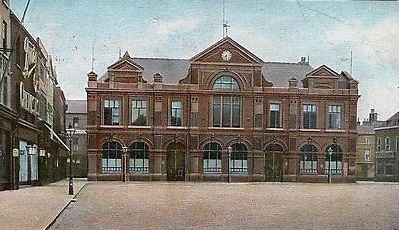
The original main frontage before the bomb damage of April 1942

The first municipal building in the town was an old moot hall in the market place which dated from 1750. It was arcaded on the ground floor so that markets could be held with an assembly room on the first floor. A Russian cannon, captured at the Siege of Sevastopol during the Crimean War, was presented to the town by the former Secretary of State for War, Lord Panmure, and installed outside the moot hall on 30 May 1859. In the early 1890s, civic leaders decided to demolish the old structure, which had become decrepit and unsafe, and to commission a new town hall on the same site.

The new building was designed by Meeke and Bramall in the Italianate style, built in red brick with stone dressings at a cost of £3,250 and completed in 1892. The design involved a symmetrical main frontage with eight bays facing onto the Market Square; the central section of two bays featured two round-headed windows on the ground floor with a single large round-headed window on the first floor flanked by pilasters supporting a pediment containing a clock in the tympanum. There were doorways in the third and the sixth bays. The left and right sections, which contained round-headed windows on the ground floor and sash windows on the first floor, were also flanked by pilasters supporting pediments at roof level. Internally, the left hand section contained retail units and a butter market, while the right hand section contained the council chamber.

Following significant population growth, largely associated the boiler-making and ironworks industries, the area became an urban district in 1895. The Leader of the Labour Party, George Lansbury, visited the town hall but fell and broke his thigh while attending a fete there on 9 December 1933. The Russian cannon was sent to be melted down to help the war effort in July 1940.

On the night of 28–29 April 1942 a single Dornier Do 217 dropped a 500 kg general-purpose bomb on the town centre blowing out the front of the town hall. Following the damage the council established new council offices at 6 Lord Street. Restoration works, which included the provision of new concrete foundations and the installation of a much less ornate façade, were completed in July 1955.

The council subsequently moved to the guildhall on Caskgate Street which was officially opened by the chairman of the Yorkshire and Humberside economic planning council, Sir Roger Stevens, on 7 July 1966. The town hall was subsequently sold to a developer and the first floor was converted for use as an entertainment venue with seating in the main hall for up to 150 people. The neighbourhood plan published by Gainsborough Town Council in October 2019 recommended that steps be taken to "return the façade to its previous glory."
