= Gainsborough Riverside Festival =

Coordinates: 53°23′43.54″N 0°46′36.67″W

Gainsborough Riverside Festival was an annual community Arts/Heritage event that runs on the second weekend of June in Gainsborough, Lincolnshire on the banks of the River Trent. The day begins around noon with a community parade along the banks of the river and entertainment is provided throughout the day until 10:30pm when the day is brought to a head with an extravagant fireworks display.

Entertainment was provided throughout the day courtesy of local bands, musicians, community groups and street performers. There is also a market for community groups and organisations usually accompanied by a continental market running along the riverside to the town centre. Art is exhibited on the day along the riverside provided by local artists and groups.

The festival which is themed differently each year has run since 2002, and from 2005 to 2012 has attracted tens of thousands of visitors.

In 2014, the festival was cancelled due to a lack of funding.

== Themes ==
- 2002: Viking
- 2003: Elizabethian/Tudor
- 2004: "Groovy Gainsborough"
- 2005: "Gainsborough goes Wild"
- 2006: "Caribbean Calypso, Gainsborough goes Bananas"
- 2007: "Gainsborough makes Waves, a Seaside Celebration"
- 2008: "Gainsborough goes Oriental"
- 2009: "Gainsborough, The Rematch" (The English Civil War)
- 2010: "Water, wind and willows"
- 2011: "Gainsborough Celebrates"
- 2012: "Gainsborough Going For Gold"
- 2013: "Gainsborough Goes Norse"
