= Frederick David Linley Penny =

Organist based in England

Frederick David Linley Penny FRCO MBE (29 September 1896 – 1978) was an organist based in England.

== Life ==
He was born in Gainsborough on 29 September 1896, the son of Arthur Penny and his wife Ada. He was educated at Queen Elizabeth's High School in Gainsborough.

He was also Conductor of the Prittlewell Musical Society, and teacher of piano at Westcliff High School for Boys.

He was awarded MBE for services to Music.

He was awarded Honorary Life membership of the Royal School of Church Music in 1965.

== Appointments ==
- Assistant organist at Lincoln Cathedral 1917 - 1921
- Organist of St. Mary's Church, Prittlewell 1921 - 1977
