= All Saints Church, Gainsborough =

Anglican church in Gainsborough, Lincolnshire, England

All Saints Church
- Parish Church of All Saints
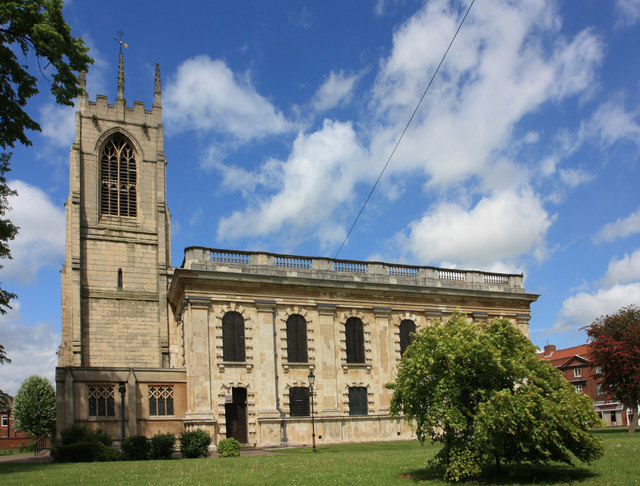
- All Saints' Church, Gainsborough
- All Saints Church
- 53.401498°N 0.776964°W
- OS grid reference: SK 81449 90110
- Location: Gainsborough, Lincolnshire
- Country: England
- Denomination: Anglican

History
- Status: Parish church

Architecture
- Functional status: Active
- Heritage designation: Grade I
- Architect: Francis Smith of Warwick

Administration
- Province: Canterbury
- Diocese: Lincoln
- Archdeaconry: Stow and Lindsey
- Deanery: Corringham
- Parish: Gainsborough and Morton

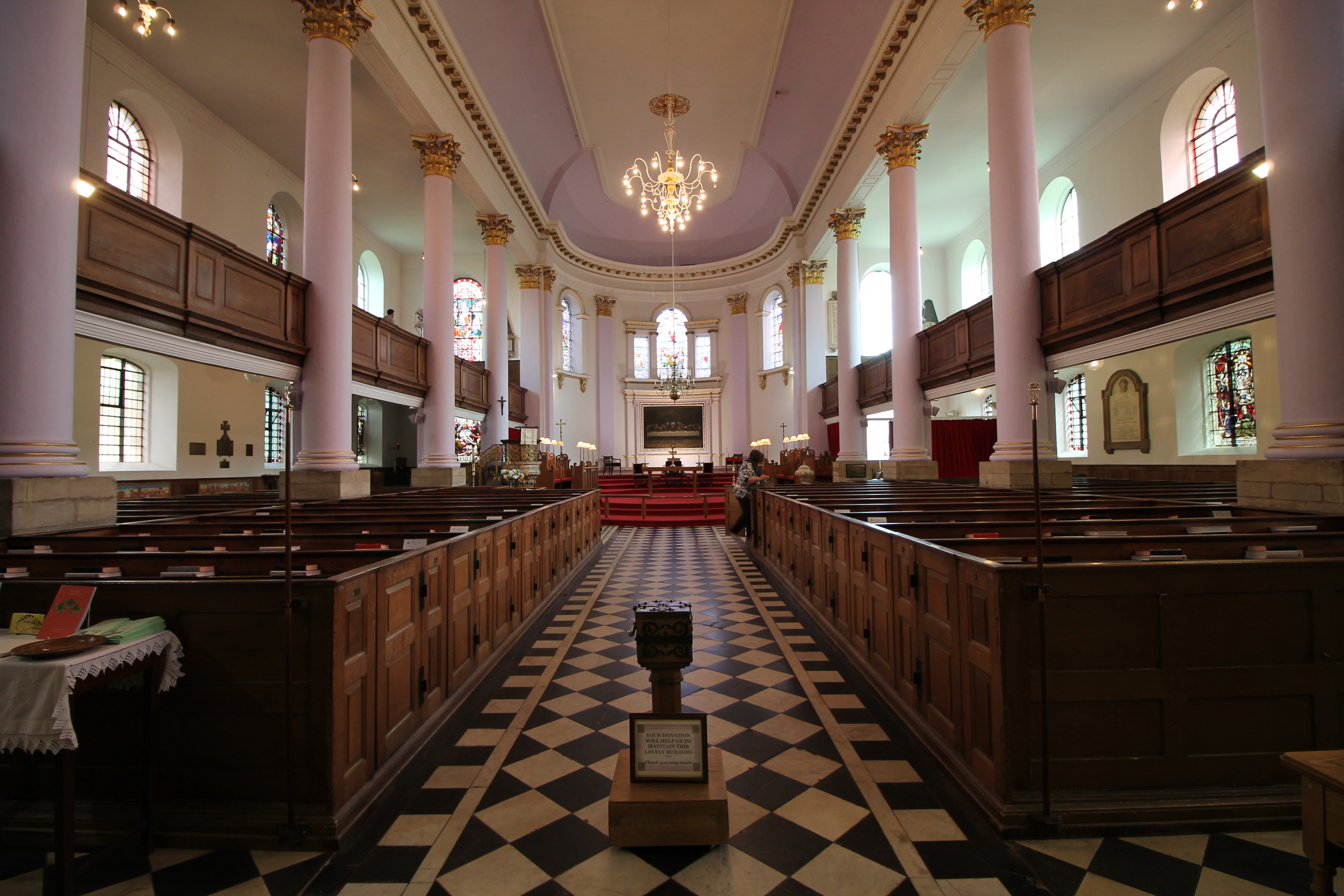
Interior of All Saints

The Church of All Saints is an active Church of England parish church in the town of Gainsborough, West Lindsey, Lincolnshire, England. It was rebuilt in the 18th century, between 1736 and 1744, with only the 14th-century tower of the former church being kept. The design is attributed to Francis Smith of Warwick. It is a Grade I listed building.
