= James Shergold Boone =

English cleric and writer

James Shergold Boone (1799–1859) was an English cleric and writer.

== Life ==
Boone was born on 30 June 1799. In 1812 he was sent to Charterhouse School, and in 1816 he became a student of Christ Church, Oxford, where in 1817 he obtained a Craven scholarship. With an ordinary degree, he took his B.A. 24 May 1820. Thomas Mozley, in a discursive chapter of his Reminiscences, speculated that the teaching of John Russell at Charterhouse had a negative effect on Boone, considered a brilliant student as a young man.

Soon after Boone left Oxford, he was offered a seat in the House of Commons by an owner of a pocket borough, but declined the offer. He lectured in London, on the "union and mutual relation" of art and science; and took his degree of M.A. 4 March 1823. For some years he was a master at Charterhouse; but having taken holy orders he accepted in June 1832 the appointment of incumbent of St. John's Church, Paddington. Here he remained until his death on 26 March 1859; that year he was appointed "select preacher" at Oxford, but was prevented by illness from taking up the duties. A brass was erected to his memory in the chancel of St. John's.

== Works ==
=== Early works ===
While an undergraduate, Boone won the chancellor's prize for Latin verse on The Foundation of the Persian Empire, and in 1817 the Newdigate for English verse on the subject of "The Farnese Hercules". In 1820 he received the chancellor's prize for the Latin essay. He published Men and Things in 1823: a Poem in three Epistles with Notes, in which he showed admiration for George Canning.

Boone wrote The Oxford Spy in Verse, the first four "dialogues" of which appeared in 1818, the fifth and last in 1819. This anonymous satire on Oxford University life created a sensation at the time of its publication. The criticisms it articulated, from the students' point of view, of the university and its tuition, were well-informed, and reflected what some senior members took to be undergraduate concerns. They were also close to points raised at the time in the Edinburgh Review, in their concern for modernisation of the syllabus.

=== Journal editor ===
In June 1822 the first number of The Council of Ten was published, a monthly periodical of which Boone was the editor and almost the sole contributor; it lasted a year.

Boone was editor of the British Critic and Theological Review. Appointed in 1834, he decided to sharpen the theological focus of the periodical, also cutting back on its function as journal of record for the clergy. He advocated a broad coalition of Protestants, giving immediate offence (according to Edward Churton, in correspondence with Arthur Philip Perceval).

Boone then came under pressure from the Tractarians, to include their reviews. By 1837 his position was made untenable by John Henry Newman. Boone's attempt to remain above the fray in the row over Renn Dickson Hampden had earned him the partisan Newman's enmity. Newman, also, was being urged into a divisive approach that would see tractarian contributions as distinctive and noticeable in the Review. In a slow-motion coup, the "mild" liberal views associated with Boone were pushed out, despite the efforts of Henry Handley Norris of the controlling Hackney Phalanx representing High Church orthodoxy, and Churton.

=== Sermons and theoretical works ===
Boone also wrote:

- An Essay on the Study of Modern History, 1821.
- National Education: a Sermon, 1833.
- The Educational Economy of England, Part i. on the External Economy of Education; or the Means of providing Instruction for the People, 1838.
- The Need of Christianity to Cities: a Sermon, 1844. Connected with Charles Blomfield's efforts to expand Anglican church provision, this sermon has been called a "jeremiad" against contemporary urban life, attacking its "foul luxuriance".
- One, Manifold, or, System; Introductory Argument, open letter addressed to Raikes Currie, 1848.
- Sermons on Various Subjects and Occasions, with a Brief Appendix on the Modern Philosophy of Unbelief, 1853.
- Two Sermons on the Prospect of a General War, 1854.
- The Position and Functions of Bishops in our Colonies; a Sermon, 1856.
- Sermons chiefly on the Theory of Belief, 1860.

== Family ==
Boone was twice married. There were no children by either marriage.

== Notes ==
Attribution

This article incorporates text from a publication now in the public domain: Stephen, Leslie, ed. (1886). "Boone, James Shergold". Dictionary of National Biography. Vol. 5. London: Smith, Elder & Co.
