= Joseph de Courcy Laffan =

Irish physician

Escutcheon of the Laffan baronets

Sir Joseph De Courcy Laffan, 1st Baronet (8 May 1786 – 7 July 1848) was an Irish medical doctor.

Laffan treated troops in the Peninsular War. He was the personal physician (Physician-in-Ordinary) to Queen Victoria's father the Duke of Kent and also the Duke of York (an elder son of King George III).

Laffan, the son of Walter Laffan, was born on 15 March 1786 in Cashel in County Tipperary, Ireland and was educated at the lay college in St Patrick's College, Maynooth, in the early 19th century. He was made a Baronet, of Otham in the County of Kent, in 1828, for treating the Duke of York for the dropsy. He died on 7 July 1848, the title becoming extinct on his death.

His eldest brother was the Roman Catholic Archbishop Robert Laffan of Cashel.

Baronetage of the United Kingdom
| New creation | Baronet (of Otham); 1828–1848 | Extinct |
| Preceded by Williams-Drummond baronets | Laffan baronets of Otham; 15 March 1828 | Succeeded by Macgregor baronets |
