= George Cuckson =

English footballer

Personal information
- Full name: George Herbert Cuckson
- Date of birth: 1878
- Place of birth: Gainsborough, England
- Date of death: 13 October 1915 (aged 37)
- Place of death: Pas-de-Calais, France
- Position: Winger

Senior career*
| Years | Team | Apps | (Gls) |
| 1898–1899 | Gainsborough Trinity | 2 | (0) |
- * Club domestic league appearances and goals

George Herbert Cuckson (also referred to as Cookson; 1878 – 13 October 1915) was an English professional footballer who played as a winger in the Football League for Gainsborough Trinity.

== Personal life ==
Cuckson was married and worked as a bricklayer. He enlisted as a private in the Lincolnshire Regiment in Gainsborough after the outbreak of the First World War. Sent to France with the 1st/5th Battalion, Lincolnshire Regiment, part of the 46th (North Midland) Division, he was killed on 13 October 1915 attacking the Hohenzollern Redoubt during the Battle of Loos. Cuckson is commemorated on the Loos Memorial.

== Career statistics ==
Appearances and goals by club, season and competition
| Club | Season | Division | League | | FA Cup | | Total | |
| Club | Season | Division | Apps | Goals | Apps | Goals | Apps | Goals |
|---|---|---|---|---|---|---|---|---|
| Gainsborough Trinity | 1898–99 | Second Division | 2 | 0 | 0 | 0 | 2 | 0 |
| Career total | | | 2 | 0 | 0 | 0 | 2 | 0 |
