= British Critic =

18th/19th-century British journal

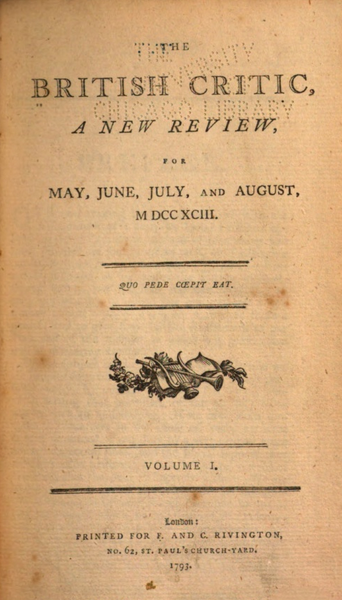
British Critic

The British Critic: A New Review was a quarterly publication, established in 1793 as a conservative and high-church review journal riding the tide of British reaction against the French Revolution. The headquarters was in London. The journal ended publication in 1843.

== High-church review ==
The Society for the Reformation of Principles, founded in 1792 by William Jones of Nayland and William Stevens, established the British Critic in 1793. Robert Nares and William Beloe, editor and assistant editor respectively, were joint proprietors with the booksellers and publishers Francis and Charles Rivington. It was started as a monthly, but in 1825 its frequency was shifted to quarterly. Nares and Beloe edited the review for about 20 years. Around 1811 the magazine was bought by Joshua Watson and Henry Handley Norris, associated with the high-church pressure group known as the Hackney Phalanx.

After 1825 the review "became more narrowly theological in scope".

== Tractarian takeover ==
The owners were, however, in some difficulty in controlling the editorial line under both Campbell and Boone; and turned eventually to Oxford Movement figures. This move was brought on by the financial losses the Critic was making by 1836. John Henry Newman offered a stable of Oxford writers who would write reviews gratuitously, at a moment when the publisher was considering closing the publication.

By the end of 1837 Newman was objecting to Boone's decisions and line (the use of Joseph Sortain as reviewer and the sympathy shown to Renn Dickson Hampden). Boone resigned by November, and Samuel Roffey Maitland took over; but he was immediately discomfited in early 1838 by a review by Edward Pusey relating to the Ecclesiastical Commissioners which placed him in a difficult personal position, and resigned. Until 1843 the Critic was then effectively dominated by the Tractarian movement, and edited successively by Newman and Thomas Mozley.

Under Mozley's editorship the Critic was strongly partisan, attacking Godfrey Faussett, and allowing Frederick Oakeley and W. G. Ward a free hand. It was closed down in October 1843. In 1844 a replacement publication, the English Review, was set up, by a group including John Kaye, with Rivingtons as published; it appeared to 1853.

== List of editors ==
- 1811 Thomas Fanshaw Middleton. In the same year (beginning of the second series) William Van Mildert and Thomas Rennell also served as editors, according to various sources; with Rennell continuing until Lyall took over.
- 1816–17 William Rowe Lyall
- c.1823–1833 Archibald Montgomery Campbell
- 1827–1833 Edward Smedley, very much engaged in the periodical, but according to Houghton never actually editor in title.
- 1834–1837 James Shergold Boone
- 1837–8 Samuel Roffey Maitland
- 1838–July 1841 John Henry Newman
- 1841–1843 Thomas Mozley
