= Gainsborough, Lincolnshire =

Town and civil parish in Lincolnshire, England

Coordinates: 53.4016°N 0.7732°W

Gainsborough
- Town and civil parish
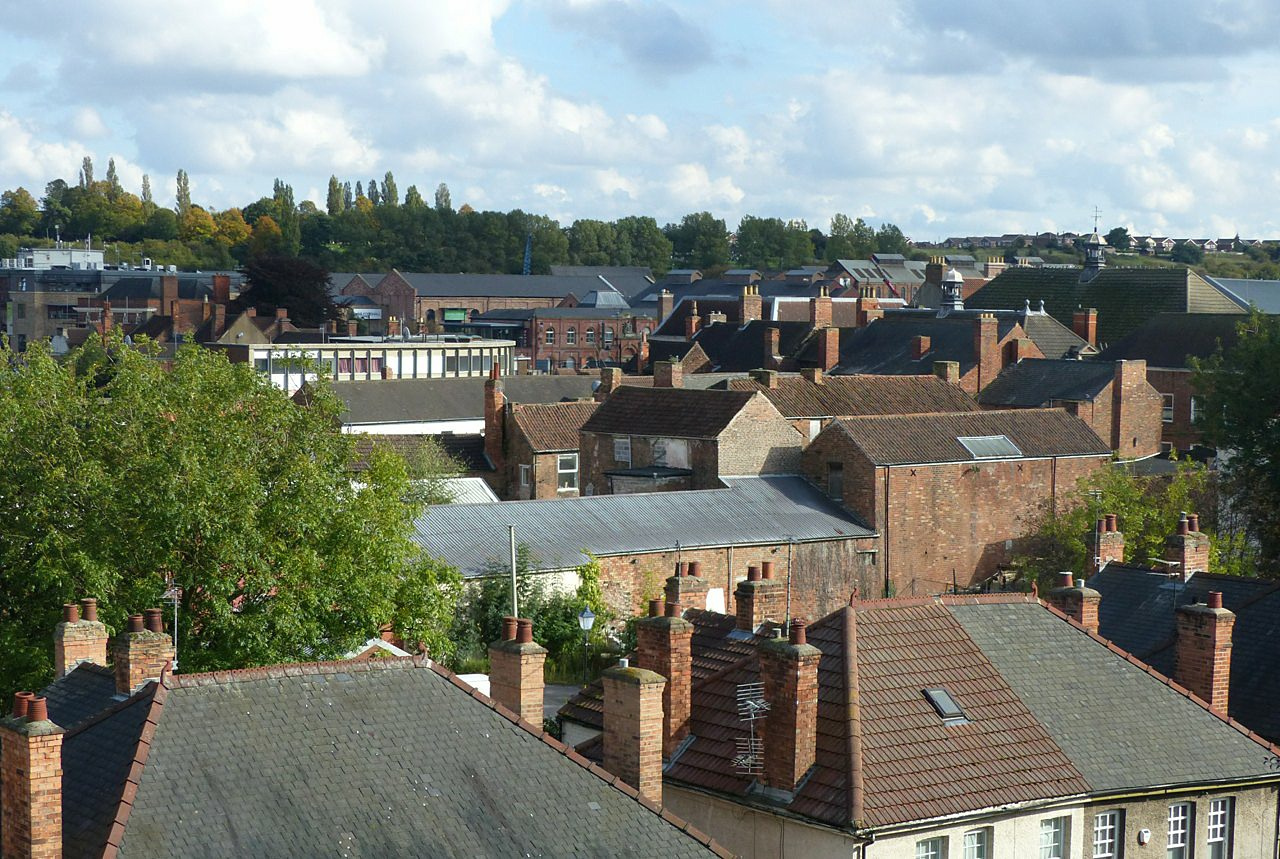
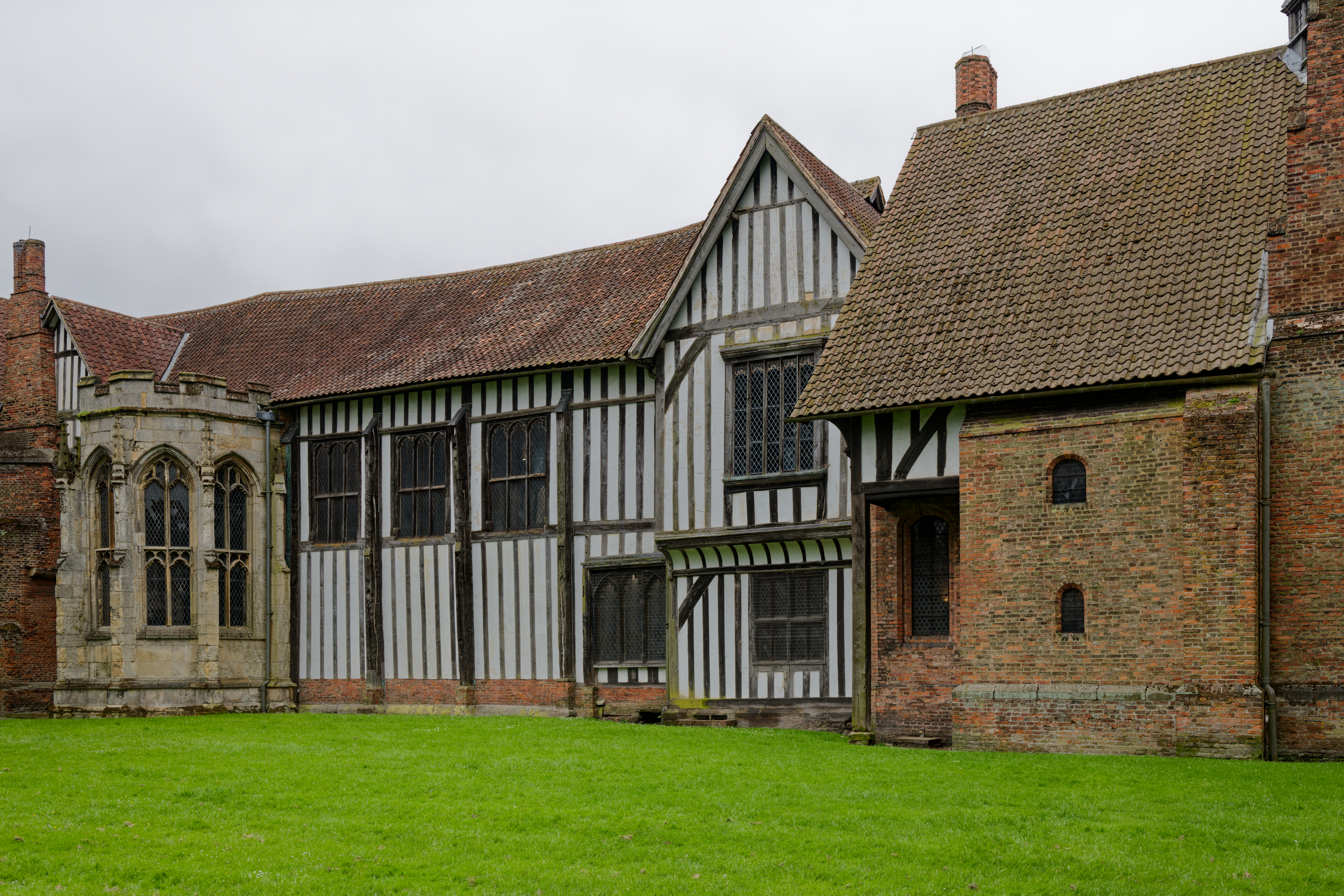
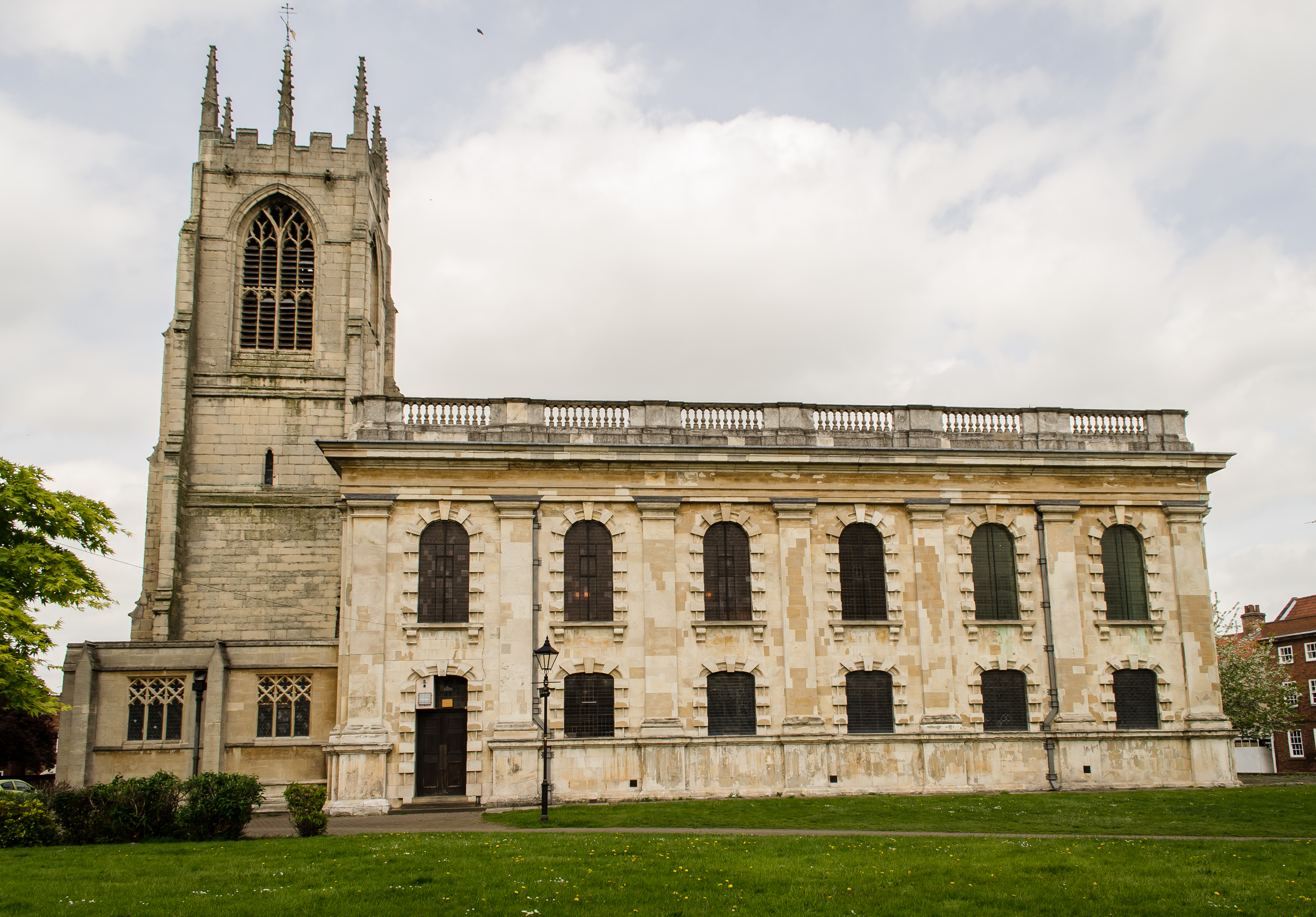
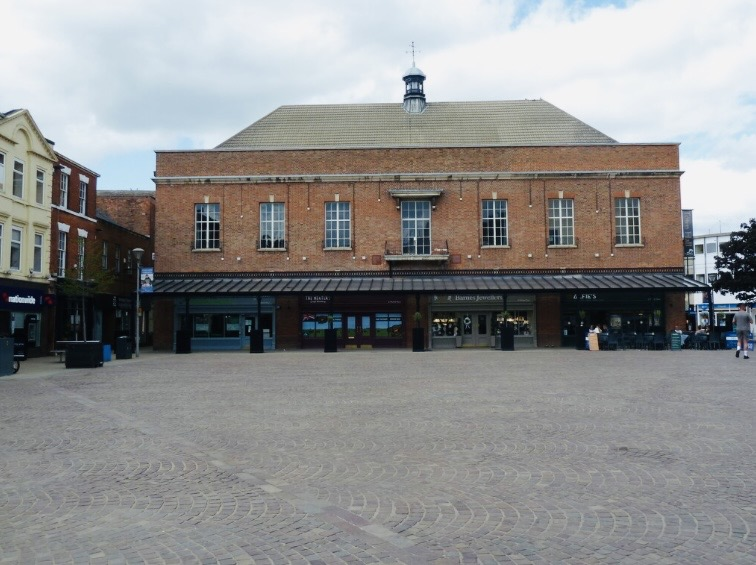
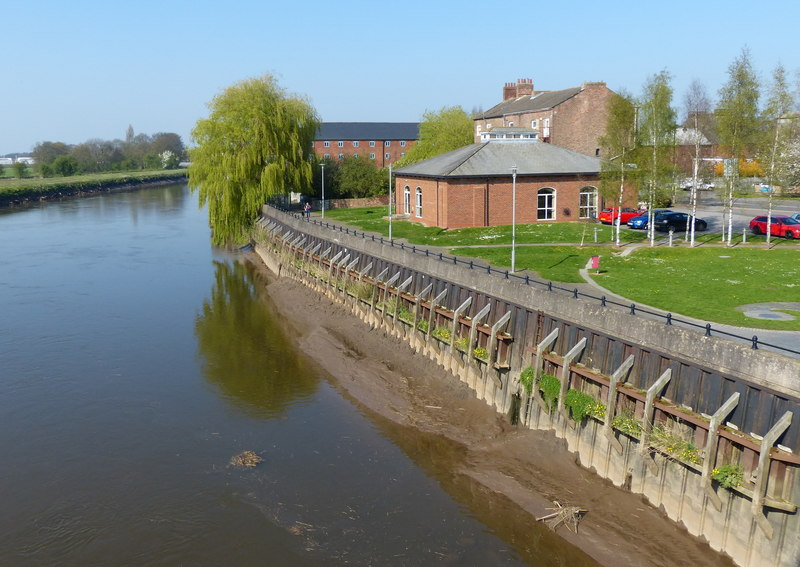
- Gainsborough Skyline Old Hall All Saints Church Old Town Hall River Trent

- Location within Lincolnshire
- Population: 20,537 (2021 Census)
- OS grid reference: SK815901
  - London: 135 mi (217 km) S
- District: West Lindsey
- Shire county: Lincolnshire
- Region: East Midlands
- Country: England
- Sovereign state: United Kingdom
- Areas of the town (2011 census BUASD): List: Hill; North East; North West; Morton; Trent
- Post town: GAINSBOROUGH
- Postcode district: DN21
- Dialling code: 01427
- Police: Lincolnshire
- Fire: Lincolnshire
- Ambulance: East Midlands
- UK Parliament: Gainsborough
- Website: https://www.west-lindsey.gov.uk/

Gainsborough (/ˈɡeɪnzbərə/) is a market town and civil parish in the West Lindsey district of Lincolnshire, England. The population was 20,842 at the 2011 census, and estimated at 23,243 in 2019. It lies on the east bank of the River Trent, 18 miles (29 km) north-west of Lincoln, 16 miles (26 km) south-west of Scunthorpe, 20 miles south-east of Doncaster and 39 miles (63 km) east of Sheffield. It is sometimes claimed to be England's furthest-inland port.

== History ==
=== King Alfred, Sweyn Forkbeard and Cnut the Great ===
The place-name Gainsborough first appears in the Anglo-Saxon Chronicle of 1013 as Gegnesburh and Gæignesburh. In the Domesday Book of 1086, it appears as Gainesburg: Gegn's fortified place. It was one of the capital cities of Mercia in the Anglo-Saxon period that preceded Danish rule. Its choice by the Vikings as an administrative centre was influenced by its proximity to the Danish stronghold at Torksey.

In 868 King Alfred married Ealhswith (Ealswitha), daughter of Æthelred Mucel, chief of the Gaini, who lived upon the banks of the River Trent, whence the town gets its name.

Historically, Gainsborough is the "capital that never was". Towards the end of July 1013, the Dane Sweyn Forkbeard and his son and heir Cnut (Canute) arrived in Gainsborough with an army of conquest. Sweyn defeated the English opposition, and King Ethelred fled the country. Sweyn was declared King of England and returned to Gainsborough. Sweyn and Cnut took up high office at the Gainsborough Castle on the site of the present-day Old Hall, while his army occupied the camp at Thonock (now known as Castle Hills). However, Sweyn died, or perhaps was killed five weeks later in Gainsborough. His son Cnut established a base elsewhere. So Gainsborough was named as capital of England and of Denmark for five weeks in the year 1013.

Cnut may have performed his unsuccessful attempt to turn the tide back in the River Trent at Gainsborough. Historians believe he may have been demonstrating on the Trent Aegir, a tidal bore. He and his supporters may have known Gainsborough was the furthest reach of the aegir, and ideal for his demonstration. However, the story was only written down a century later by Henry of Huntingdon, who gives no location, and it may have been a myth or a fable.

=== Medieval Gainsborough ===
The Domesday Book (1086) records that Gainsborough was a community of farmers, villeins and sokemen, tenants of Geoffrey de Guerche.

The Lindsey Survey of 1115–1118 records that Gainsborough was held by Nigel d'Aubigny, the forebear of the Mowbray family, whose interest in Gainsborough continued until at least the end of the 14th century.

A weekly market was granted by King John in 1204.

=== Gainsborough Old Hall ===
Thomas Burgh acquired the manor of Gainsborough in 1455. He built Gainsborough Old Hall between 1460 and 1480, a large, 15th-century, timber-framed medieval strong house, and one of the best-preserved manor houses in Britain. It boasts a magnificent Great Hall and strong brick tower. King Richard III in 1483 and King Henry VIII in 1541 both stayed at the Old Hall. The manor was sold to the Hickman family in 1596.

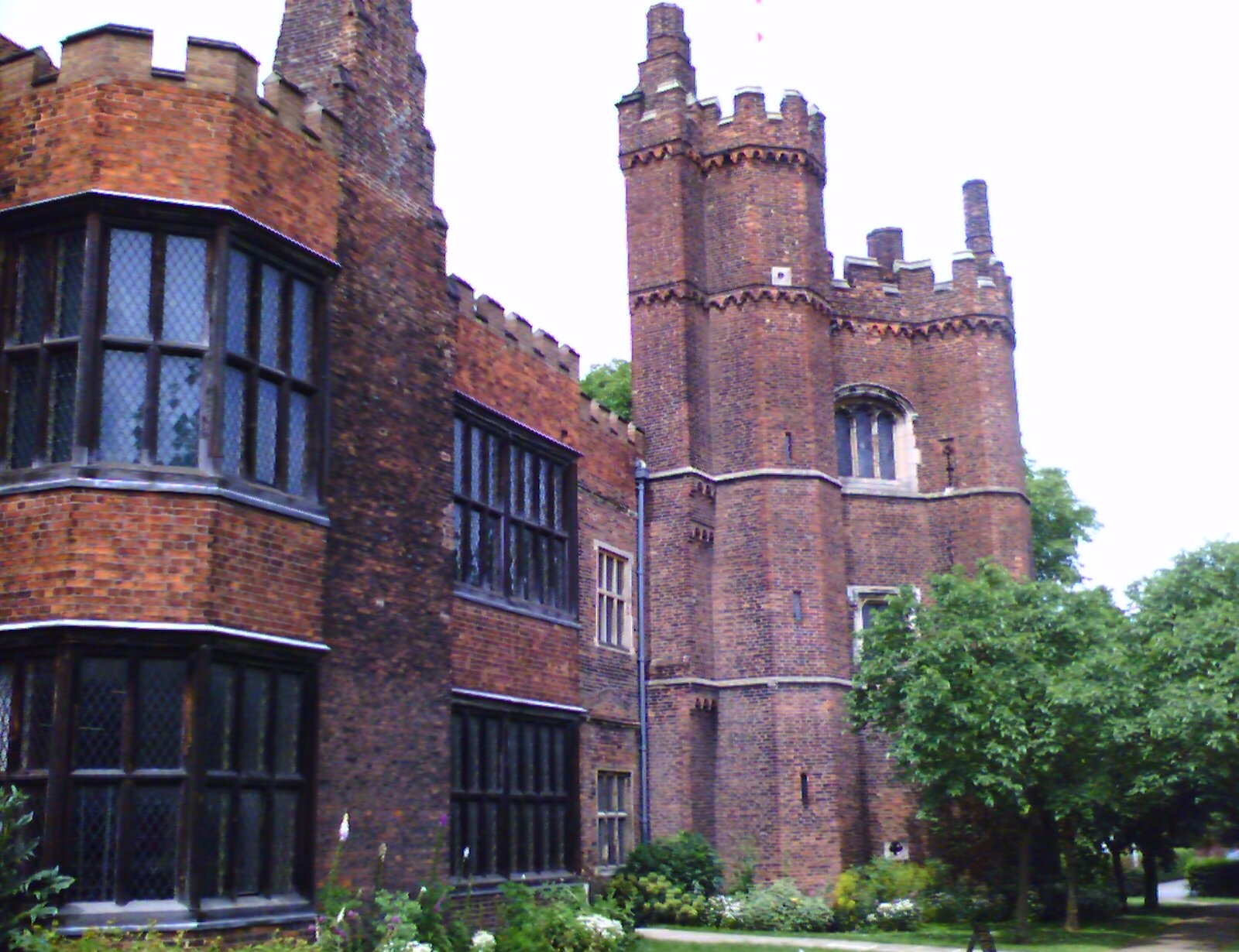
Gainsborough Old Hall

=== English Civil War ===
The town was garrisoned for the King in January 1643 and began cooperating with the garrison at Newark in raiding the surrounding countryside and harassing Parliamentarians there. With the Great North Road blocked to Parliamentarian traffic, Gainsborough became significant as part of a route around Newark by way of Lincoln and the line of the modern A15 road. It was in Royalist interests to obstruct this, which gave rise to battles at Gainsborough and Winceby. Parliament captured Gainsborough in the battle on 20 July, but it was immediately besieged by a large Royalist army and forced to surrender after three days.

Parliament captured Gainsborough again on 18 December 1643, but had to withdraw in March 1644, razing the town's defences to prevent their use by the enemy. The Earl of Manchester's army passed through Gainsborough in May 1644 on its way to York and the Battle of Marston Moor.

After the Civil War ended in 1645, several people in Gainsborough were fined for Royalist sympathies, including Sir Willoughby Hickman, 1st Baronet at the Old Hall, who had been created the first Baronet of Gainsborough by Charles I in 1643.

=== Churches ===
The first record of a church at Gainsborough is in 1180, when the rectory there was granted by Roger de Talebu to the great Preceptory of the Knights Templar in Lindsey, at Willoughton. In 1547, following the English Reformation, the parish of Gainsborough came under the jurisdiction of the Bishop of Lincoln for the first time.

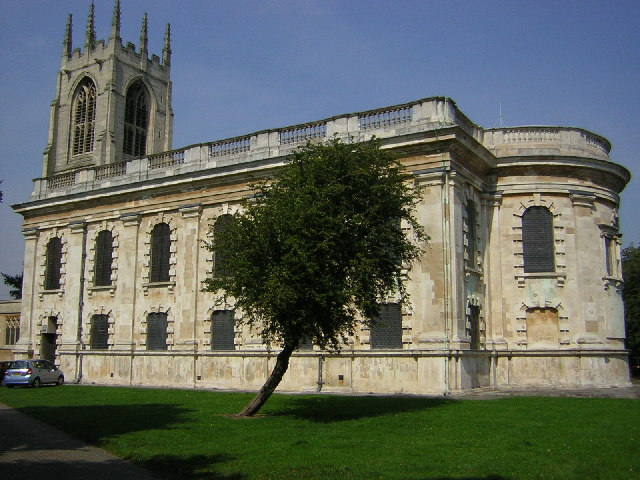
All Saints Church, Gainsborough

The medieval Church of All Saints fell into disrepair after the Civil War. In 1736 it was demolished to make way for a new parish church completed in 1748 in a mix of perpendicular Gothic and Classical Revival styles. All that remains of the medieval church is the west tower, 90 feet high with a ring of eight bells. A monument to Richard Rollett, master sailmaker on Captain James Cook's second voyage, is located in the porch. All Saints remains the main parish church of the town.

The town's rising 19th-century population called for a second church in the south of the town; Holy Trinity Church opened in 1843. This was followed by St John the Divine Church in Ashcroft Road in 1882, and St George's Church in Heapham Road in the 1950s. Holy Trinity closed in 1971 and is now the Trinity Arts Centre. St John the Divine church was closed in 2002 and it is now used for a cafe and community centre.

Non-conformism flourished in Gainsborough. It has often been claimed that some of the Mayflower Pilgrims worshipped in secret at the Old Hall before sailing for Holland to find religious freedom in 1609; no historical evidence for this has been found, whereas the congregation of John Smyth that met in the town developed into the Baptists and some returned to England. The John Robinson Memorial Church in Church Street was dedicated in 1897; the cornerstone was laid by Thomas F. Bayard, US Ambassador. Now the United Reformed Church, it was named in honour of John Robinson (1576–1625), pastor of the "Pilgrim Fathers" before they left on the Mayflower.

John Wesley, the founder of Methodism, preached in Gainsborough several times between 1759 and 1790. The town's first Methodist chapel opened in Church Lane in 1788, moving to a new site in North Street in 1804, and rebuilt there as St Stephen's in 1966. The Primitive Methodists set up in the town in 1819, with chapels in Spring Gardens (1838), Trinity Street (1877) and Ropery Road (1910). St Thomas's Church in Cross Street caters for the town's Roman Catholics.

=== Second World War ===
Gainsborough suffered its only large-scale air raid of the war on the night of 10 May 1941. High-explosive bombs and incendiaries were dropped, but many fell harmlessly on the surrounding countryside. There was only minor damage in the town and no casualties.

On the night of 28–29 April 1942 a single Dornier 217 dropped a stick of bombs on the town centre, causing extensive damage and the loss of seven lives. On 31 December 1942, a RCAF Bristol Beaufighter aircraft on a training exercise crashed on Noel Street, killing both airmen and a three-year-old girl. On 22 May 1944 a RAF Spitfire fighter, in a training exercise, collided with a Wellington bomber and crashed into a Sheffield-bound goods train as it was passing over the railway bridge on Lea Road. The pilot was the only casualty.

In the early hours of 5 March 1945 a single Junkers Ju 88 fighter/bomber made a low-level attack over the town, dropping anti-personnel bombs on Church Street and the surrounding residential area. Three people died and 50 houses were damaged.

=== New town ===
There was a proposal to develop Gainsborough as a new town linked to Sheffield, but the plan was not pursued. New housing was instead built to the south-east of Sheffield.

=== Governance ===
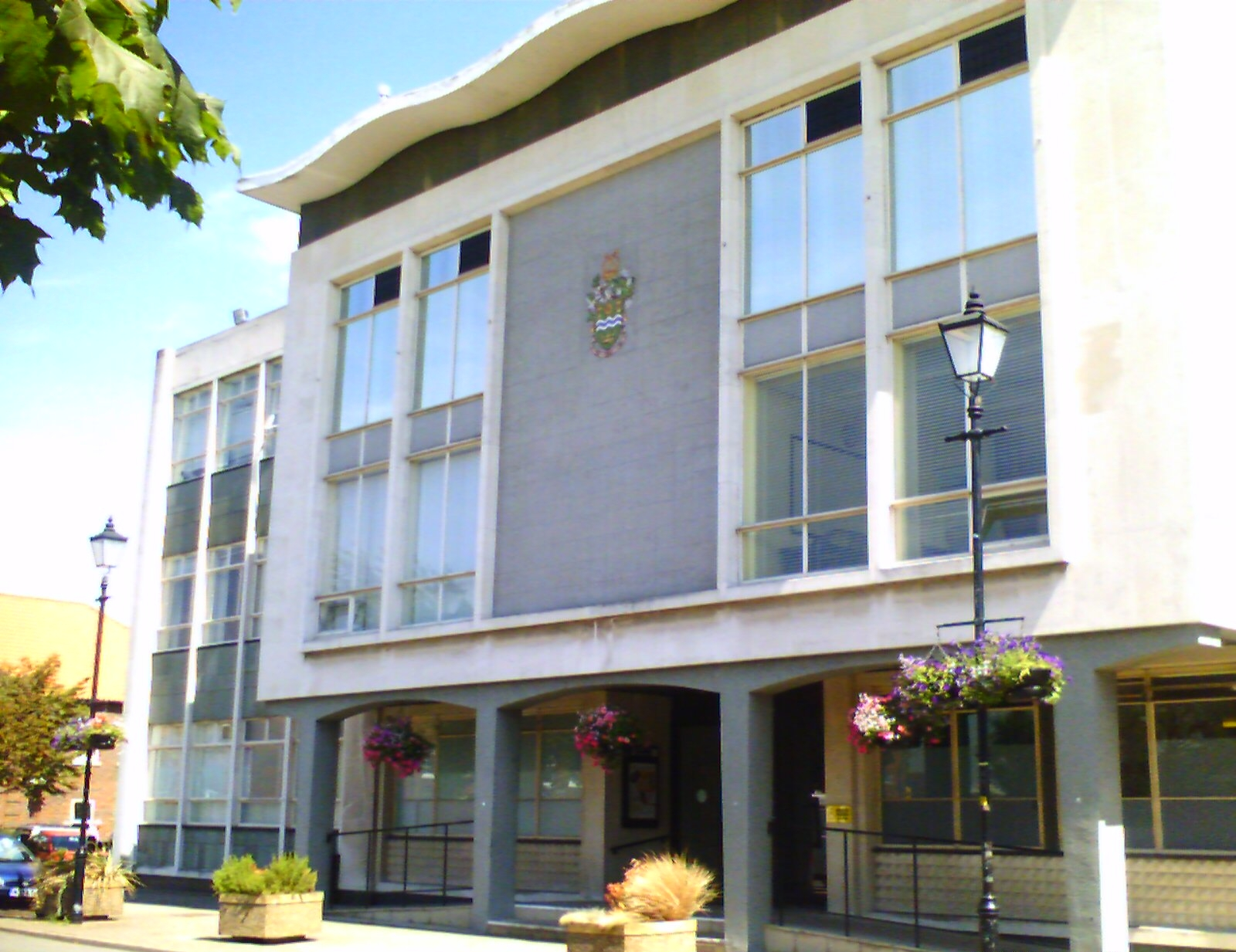
The Guildhall, former offices of the West Lindsey District Council

The town was before 1974 in the Gainsborough Urban District in the county of Lindsey. West Lindsey District Council was formed from five former councils. Gainsborough Town Council was established in 1992, and in the same year Gainsborough's first mayor was appointed. The council consists of four wards, Gainsborough Hill, Gainsborough North-East, Gainsborough North-West, and Gainsborough Trent, which elect a total of 18 councillors. The next municipal elections are scheduled for May 2027.

Sir Edward Leigh has been Gainsborough's Member of Parliament (MP) since 1983.

=== Oil ===
In late May 1958, BP discovered oil at Corringham, causing a blow-out, then at Gainsborough in January 1959.

There were 17 drilling sites in the Gainsborough area, producing 400 barrels per day, in 1962.

== Geography ==
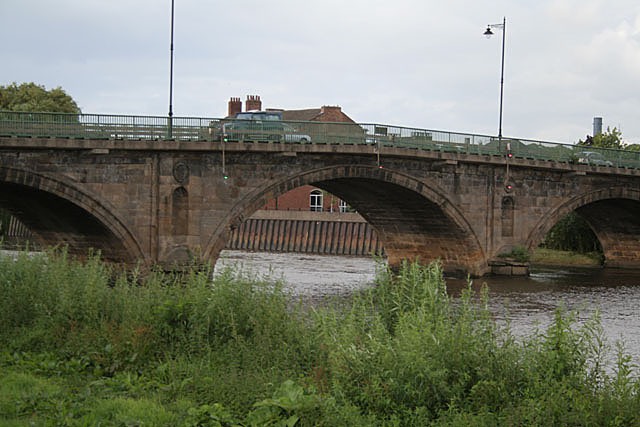
A631 bridge over the Trent

The town is at the meeting point of the east–west A631, which crosses the Trent on Trent Bridge at the only point between the M180 and the A57), the A156 from the south to Torksey and A159 from Scunthorpe).

The dual-carriageway Thorndike Way was intended to link with the A15 at Caenby Corner; it only reaches eastward to the town boundary. It is named after the locally born actress Dame Sybil Thorndike. The former A631 through the town is now the B1433. Work on the 4km bypass was started by Tarmac in late 1972, and opened on Friday 10 May 1974.

The civil parish extends south across rural land to Lea. The boundary passes to the south of Warren Wood, north of Lea Wood Farm, and along the northern edge of Lea Wood northwards through Bass Wood, where it meets Corringham, the main settlement to the east of Gainsborough. The boundary crosses Thorndike Way (A631) and briefly follows the B1433. At Belt Farm it meets Thonock, then follows The Belt Road, to the south of Gainsborough Golf Club, then down Thonock Hill to the edge of the Trent Valley.

== George Eliot and The Mill on the Floss ==
In order to see Mr and Mrs Glegg at home, we must enter the town of St Ogg's, — that venerable town with the red fluted roofs and the broad warehouse gables, where the black ships unlade themselves of their burthens from the far north, and carry away, in exchange, the precious inland products, the well-crushed cheese and the soft fleeces which my refined readers have doubtless become acquainted with through the medium of the best classic pastorals. It is one of those old, old towns which impress one as a continuation and outgrowth of nature, as much as the nests of the bower-birds or the winding galleries of the white ants; a town which carries the traces of its long growth and history like a millennial tree, and has sprung up and developed in the same spot between the river and the low hill from the time when the Roman legions turned their backs on it from the camp on the hillside, and the long-haired sea-kings came up the river and looked with fierce, eager eyes at the fatness of the land. It is a town "familiar with forgotten years". The shadow of the Saxon hero-king still walks there fitfully, reviewing the scenes of his youth and love-time, and is met by the gloomier shadow of the dreadful heathen Dane, who was stabbed in the midst of his warriors by the sword of an invisible avenger, and who rises on autumn evenings like a white mist from his tumulus on the hill, and hovers in the court of the old hall by the river-side, the spot where he was thus miraculously slain in the days before the old hall was built. It was the Normans who began to build that fine old hall, which is, like the town, telling of the thoughts and hands of widely sundered generations; but it is all so old that we look with loving pardon at its inconsistencies, and are well content that they who built the stone oriel, and they who built the Gothic façade and towers of finest small brickwork with the trefoil ornament, and the windows and battlements defined with stone, did not sacriligiously pull down the ancient half-timbered body with its oak-roofed banqueting-hall.

— George Eliot, The Mill on the Floss, Book Sixth, Chapter XII.

Many scholars believe Gainsborough to be the basis for the fictional town of St Ogg's in George Eliot's The Mill on the Floss (1860). The novelist visited Gainsborough in 1859, staying in the house of a shipbuilder in Bridge Street, which survives today as the United Services Club. The stone bridge and the nearby willow tree are mentioned and the Old Hall is described in detail. Thomas Miller's Our Old Town published two years before, included the true story of a miller who loses a lawsuit after assaulting his adversary, and George Eliot used a similar story plot in The Mill on the Floss as the basis of the Tulliver/Wakem feud. It is also possible that she witnessed the Trent Aegir, which inspired the flood in her story's climax.

== Economy ==
=== Boiler-maker and ironworks ===
Gainsborough has a long history of industry. It was the manufacturing base of Marshall, Sons & Co., a boiler-maker founded by William Marshall in 1848, who died in 1861 and was buried in the cemetery in Ropery Road. His business became one of the joint-stock companies run by his sons James and Henry. It occupied the 16-acre Britannia Ironworks, the biggest in Europe when built. Marshall's Works' steam engines were sold worldwide until it closed in the 1980s. The site is now split among various companies. Tesco in Beaumont Street and Dransfield's occupy about nine acres; the remainder is held by local companies.

=== Packaging ===
Another area of Gainsborough industry is Rose Brothers, named after William German Rose and Walter Rose, the co-founders. In 1893 William Rose invented the world's first packaging machine. Two years later it bought the Trentside Works site and started to expand into many other areas, producing items such as starch, razor blades and sweets such as Cadbury's chocolates, its name appearing on the Roses selection. The firm produced seaside rock-making machines, cigarette-making machines and bread-slicing and wrapping machines. When it closed, A. M. P. Rose bought the confectionery packaging side. The Rose Brothers Ground hosted cricket matches.

By the east bank of the Trent near the railway bridge is a large mill owned by Kerry Ingredients (headquartered in Tralee).

=== Wigs, jokes and exhausts ===
Gainsborough is the home of two of the largest importers of jokes and novelties into the UK: Smiffy's (formerly known as RH Smith & Sons, founded in 1894), and Pam's of Gainsborough, a smaller firm founded in 1986. Smiffy's were the only wigmaker left in the UK until December 2008, when bulk production moved to the Far East, and over 35 jobs were lost.

Another local business is Eminox, founded in 1978. It started by building replacement exhausts for the local bus company, then expanded into manufacturing large stainless steel exhaust systems for buses and commercial vehicles. It also builds low-emission catalytic systems for the London low emission zone.

== Landmarks ==
Beside Riverside Walk are Whitton's Mill flats, which won a Royal Town Planning Institute award for the East Midlands. Marshall's Yard also received an award, for regeneration.

West Lindsey District Council had its offices at the Guildhall, Lord Street, but moved in January 2008 to a £4.3 million new-build in Marshall's Yard.

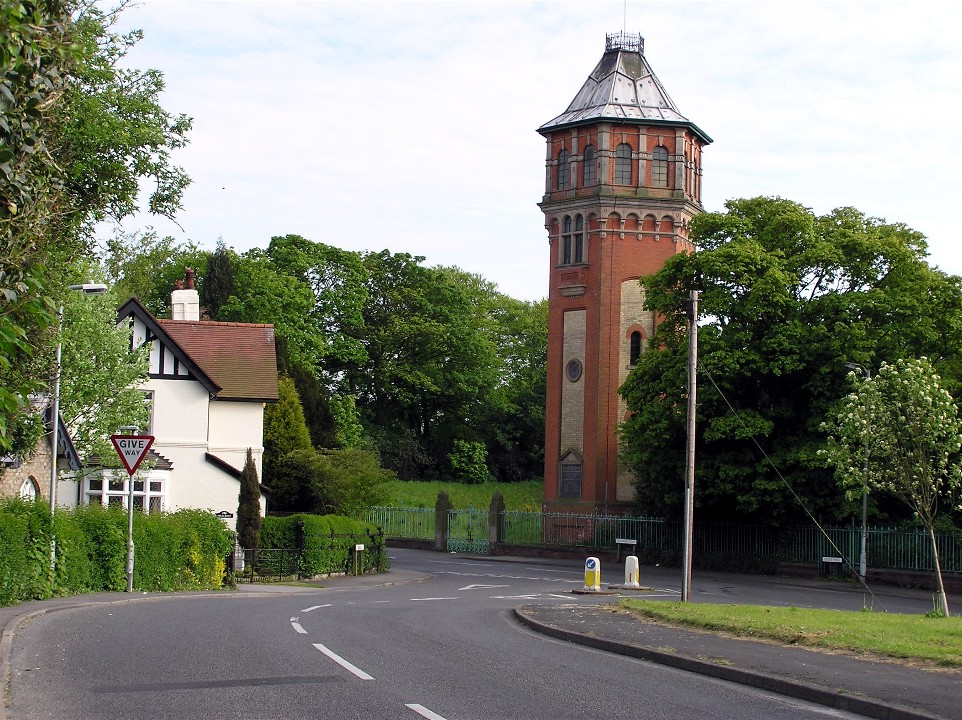
View of the Water Tower on Heapham Road

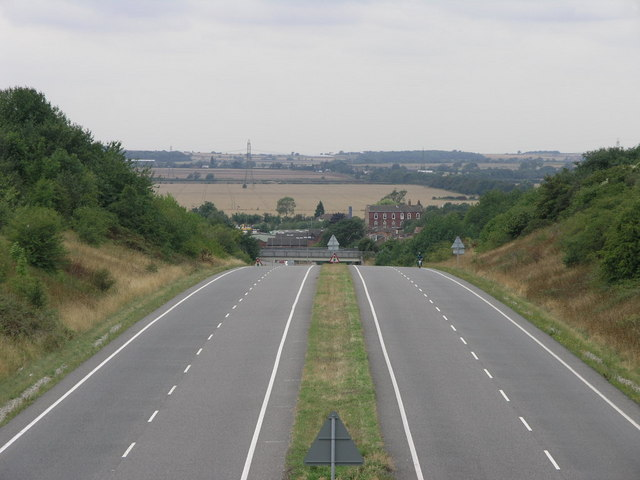
A631 bypass – Thorndike Way looking west

Silver Street is home to many Gainsborough shops. Elswitha Hall is the birthplace of Halford John Mackinder, founder of the Geographical Association.

A water tower in Heapham Road was built in 1897 to mark the Diamond Jubilee of Queen Victoria.

== Transport ==
=== Railway ===
The town has two railway stations on different routes. The main station is Gainsborough Lea Road in Lea Road (A156) in the south of the town, serving the Sheffield-Lincoln and Doncaster-Lincoln lines with mainly hourly services to Lincoln, Sheffield and Doncaster. Sheffield services generally call at Retford, Worksop and Sheffield only, then continue towards Leeds. The other station is Gainsborough Central near the town centre. It serves the Brigg branch line and is the terminus of an hourly service to and from Sheffield on Mondays to Saturdays, calling at all stations. On Saturdays there are three services to Cleethorpes via Brigg and Grimsby Town.

Where the railway crosses the Trent, the four lines come together at two junctions on either side of the river. The lines from Lincoln and Cleethorpes meet at East Trent Junction, east of the river. Those from Sheffield and Doncaster meet at West Trent Junction on the opposite side in Nottinghamshire.

West Burton Power Station is three miles (4.8 km) to the south-west of the town, next to the Sheffield-Lincoln Line.

=== Buses ===
The town bus station in Hickmen Street has frequent services on Monday to Saturday, but no Sunday services. Most town routes are served by Stagecoach. Two local services connect the uphill area of the town and Morton to the town centre, one running clockwise, the other anti-clockwise. The town has a connection hub with hourly services to Lincoln, Scunthorpe and Retford and a service to Doncaster every two hours. These serve several villages along the route. Other bus services run during school terms.

=== Rivers ===
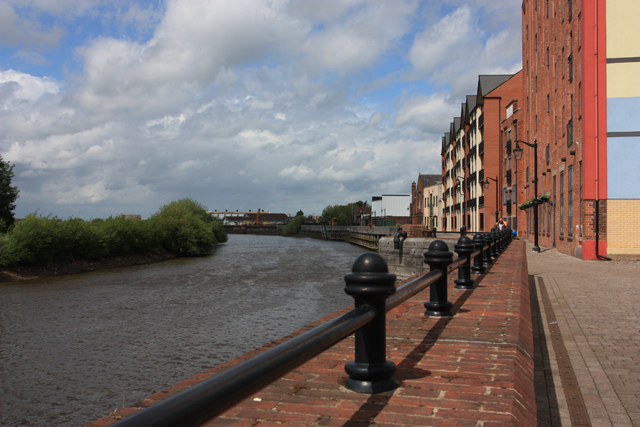
River Trent in Gainsborough, 2009

Gainsborough is sometimes claimed as the British port furthest inland, at over 55 miles (89 km) from the North Sea. It has had a long history of river shipping trade.

There is still one wharf, but ships no longer navigate this far up river. Commercial shipping remains further down the river at Gunness Wharf, Grove Wharf and Flixborough Wharf, which has direct rail links. This leads to some to argue that Goole, 23.7 miles (38.1 km) to the north of the town, is now the most inland port in the UK.

At the A631 Trent Bridge, there was a ferry before 1787, a distance of 235 feet. The bridge was completed for £12,000 in the spring of 1791, but it meant that taller river traffic of the day could no longer go further upstream. Originally a toll bridge, it was bought by the Ministry of Transport, Lindsey County Council, Gainsborough Urban District and Nottinghamshire County Council for £130,000 in 1927 and declared toll-free on 31 March 1932.

In the 1970s, the town council planned to build another bridge adjacent to the existing one on the North side and extend the Thorndike Way dual-carriageway across the river and join The Flood Road dual-carriageway. However, all of the funding for the project was given for the completion of the Humber Bridge, which opened in 1981.

== Sport ==
The town is home to the semi-professional football club Gainsborough Trinity F.C., which plays in the Northern Premier League, the seventh level of English football. For a brief spell in the early 20th century, the club was professional and a member of the Football League. The Gainsborough United F.C. was active in 1980.

Gainsborough Rugby Club (the All Blacks) has played Rugby Union in the town since 1924.

The town is home to the Gainsborough & Morton Striders Athletic Club, who in 2013 were awarded England Athletics' Run England National Group of the Year. The club was founded in July 1983.

There are several cycling clubs, including Trent Valley Road Club, Viking Velo and Gainsborough Aegir Cycling Club.

== Media ==
Television signals are received from either the Belmont or Emley Moor TV transmitters. Local radio stations are BBC Radio Lincolnshire, Greatest Hits Radio Lincolnshire, Hits Radio Lincolnshire and Trentside Radio, a community based radio station. The town's local newspapers are the Gainsborough Standard and Lincolnshire Echo.

== Attractions ==
The house and grounds of Richmond Park, in the north of the town, opened as a public park in 1947; attractions include greenhouses, an aviary and a 600-year-old oak tree. Whitton Gardens on the Riverside opened in 1973.

Gainsborough Model Railway Society features one of the largest model railways in ‘O’ gauge, depicting The East Coast Main Line from Kings Cross to Leeds Central. The model railway build commenced in 1953, covers 2500 square feet, has over 1200 feet of main line track and needs ten operators.

Gainsborough Old Hall is over five hundred years old and one of the best preserved medieval manor houses in England.

Gainsborough Town Hall, which was built in 1892, is now an entertainment venue with seating for up to 150 people.

Renovation of the town's river banks was completed in 2002, providing riverside access. On the second weekend in June in that year, the town hosted the Gainsborough Riverside Festival, an annual arts/heritage event that ran until 2015.

Trinity Art Centre hosts live music, plays, comedy, and also screens films.

There is a volunteer-run charity called Gainsborough Heritage Centre, with displays of a range of object from the town's past.

== Education ==
Unlike most of the UK, Lincolnshire retains a tripartite system, with secondary education for many pupils decided by voluntary examination at eleven. Within the town, there is the selective Queen Elizabeth's High School, and the non-selective state school, The Gainsborough Academy.

The town has several primary schools.

There are links beyond the town to the John Leggott Sixth Form College in Scunthorpe, North Lindsey College, and Lincoln College.

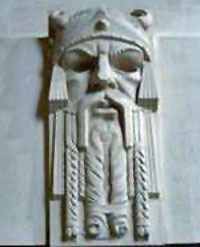
Sweyn Forkbeard, king of Denmark and England, who died in Gainsborough in 1014

== Notable people ==
In birth order:

- Sweyn Forkbeard (died 1014), King of Denmark and England, died in Gainsborough.
- Simon Patrick (1626–1707), theologian and Bishop of Chichester
- Willoughby Bertie, 4th Earl of Abingdon (1740–1799), peer and music patron
- Thomas Mozley (1806–1893), clergyman and writer
- Thomas Miller (1807–1874), author and poet
- James Bowling Mozley (1813–1878), theologian
- John Collingham Moore (1829–1880), portrait painter
- Sir Halford Mackinder (1861–1947), geographer and explorer
- George Cuckson (1878–1915), footballer
- Dame Sybil Thorndike (1882–1976), actress
- Frank Airey (born 1887), footballer with Gainsborough Trinity
- Kathleen E. Carpenter (1891–1970), freshwater ecologist
- Rex Woods (1903–1987), artist and illustrator
- Bill Podmore (1931–1994), TV producer, Coronation Street
- Mervyn Winfield (1933–2014), Nottinghamshire cricketer
- John Alderton (born 1940), actor, Upstairs Downstairs, Please Sir!, the original series of Fireman Sam
- Susan Wakefield (1942–2022), New Zealand Tax expert, philanthropist
- John Hargreaves (born 1944), England cricketer
- Andy Dalby (born 1948), guitarist with Kingdom Come and Camel
- Chris Mosdell (born 1949), lyricist with Yellow Magic Orchestra, Eric Clapton and Michael Jackson
- Julia Deakin (born 1952), actress
- Steve Housham (born 1976), footballer and manager

== International relations ==
Gainsborough is twinned with Cham, Germany.

== Arms ==
Coat of arms of Gainsborough, Lincolnshire

Notes
Originally granted to Gainsborough Urban District Council on 15 March 1950.
Crest
On a wreath of the colours out of a mural coronet two anchors in saltire Or.
Escutcheon
Vert on a fesse wavy Argent in chief a cog-wheel between two garbs and in base an ancient crown Or a fesse wavy Azure.
Motto
Strive For The Gain Of All
