= Macgregor baronets =

Baronetcy in the Baronetage of the United Kingdom

- Macgregor baronets of Savile Row
- Creation date: 1828
- Status: dormant
- Motto: E'en do and spair nocht

The Macgregor Baronetcy, of Savile Row in the County of Middlesex, is a title in the Baronetage of the United Kingdom. It was created on 17 March 1828 for Patrick Macgregor, Serjeant-Surgeon to King George IV. Charles Reginald Macgregor (1847–1902), second son of the third Baronet, was a Brigadier-General in the Army.

== Macgregor baronets, of Savile Row (1828) ==
- Sir Patrick Macgregor, 1st Baronet (died 1828)
- Sir William Macgregor, 2nd Baronet (1817–1846)
- Sir Charles Macgregor, 3rd Baronet (1819–1879)
- Sir William Gordon Macgregor, 4th Baronet (1846–1905)
- Sir Cyril Patrick McConnell Macgregor, 5th Baronet (1887–1958)
- Sir Robert James McConnell Macgregor, 6th Baronet (1890–1963)
- Sir Edwin Robert Macgregor, 7th Baronet (1931–2003)
- Ian Grant Macgregor, is the presumed 8th Baronet (born 1959); but his name does not appear on the Official Roll.

== Notes ==
Baronetage of the United Kingdom
Preceded by Laffan baronets	Macgregor baronets of Savile Row; 17 March 1828	Succeeded by Key baronets
