= Eminox =

British exhaust and emission control systems manufacturer

Eminox Limited is an English firm which designs and manufactures high performance stainless steel exhaust and emission control systems for bus, truck, rail and off-highway vehicles. The company was started in 1978, and is based in Gainsborough, Lincolnshire, England.

The name 'Eminox' is derived from the initials of two founders, Norman Emerson and David Milles, and 'Inox' which refers to "stainless steel".

== Products ==
Eminox's exhaust products include the following:

- Diesel Particulate Filter Systems
- Fuel Borne Catalyst System
- Diesel Oxidation Catalyst Systems
- Spark Arrestors
- Stainless Steel Stacks
- Electronic Monitoring Systems
- Selective Catalytic Reduction Systems

== History ==
Eminox was formed on 28 January 1978 in Lincoln, and consisted of David Milles, Norman Emerson and William Murphy. An early order for a redesigned bus exhaust system for the local bus company led to orders from other national bus companies. The aim of the company was to produce an exhaust system that would last for the lifetime of the vehicle, but that would also meet the requirements of the chassis/body configuration as well as the operating conditions.

In early 1979, Nocorrode, a local company that manufactured replacement stainless steel exhaust systems for cars and fire engines, went into receivership. Eminox purchased the company from the receiver, thus tripling its workforce from 5 to 15. With the purchase came Nocorrode's premises in Tillbridge lane, which became the new home for Eminox.

In 1985, the company opened its first standalone fitting facility for vertical exhausts systems, or 'stacks' as they became known. In 1989, Eminox also opened a new fitting facility in Stoke-on-Trent.

In 1987, the Tillbridge Lane site was at capacity, so an alternative site was identified in Gainsborough, Lincolnshire. Initially the new premises had no offices, but within 3 years a 4,000sq ft purpose-built office complex was completed.

A distinctive Eminox heatshield.

In 1990, Eminox started producing exhaust systems for diesel multiple units for the rail industry. At this time, Eminox also developed a new aluminium mounting system for vertical stacks – the distinctive visual appeal of these units has since become synonymous with Eminox.

In 1990, Eminox established a relationship with Erland Nilson AB which provided access to the Swedish bus market, and in 1992 Eminox began to expand into the Dutch market. In 2005, Eminox branches were opened in Paris, France and Gothenburg, Sweden.

By 1994, Eminox was becoming increasingly aware of the growing environmental pressure to clean up diesel exhaust systems; in conjunction with Johnson Matthey, a leading chemical and catalyst technology company – Eminox developed the CRT (Diesel Particulate Filter) system which could filter out 90% of particulate matter.

In 2002, Eminox was awarded accreditation to TS 16949, the global automotive quality standard, which was derived from ISO 9001:2000

Currently, Eminox employs in the region of 250 staff in Gainsborough, and elsewhere in the UK.
