= Herbert Hargreaves =

English cricketer

Herbert Silvester Hargreaves (30thMarch 1913 – 29 September 1990) was an English first-class cricketer, who played nineteen matches for Yorkshire County Cricket Club between 1934 and 1938. He also appeared for Yorkshire Second XI between 1934 and 1938, and the Minor Counties in 1937.

Born in Cinder Hill, Shireoaks, Worksop, Nottinghamshire, England, Hargreaves was a right arm fast medium bowler, who took 59 wickets at 21.20, with a best of 5 for 93 against Kent. He scored 53 runs at an average of 3.31, with a best score of 9, and took five catches. Hargreaves took a wicket with his first ball against Cambridge University in 1934.

He had connections with Hull Town C.C. and Sheffield United C.C., and went to Perth, Scotland, as a professional in 1939.

Hargreaves died in September 1990, in Bury St Edmunds, Suffolk.

His son, John Hargreaves, played Minor County cricket for Suffolk, including a Gillette Cup match in 1966.
