= Gainsborough United F.C. =

Gainsborough United
- Full name: Gainsborough United Football Club

Gainsborough United Football Club was an English association football club based in Gainsborough, Lincolnshire. They reached the 3rd round of the FA Vase in 1980.
