= Mervyn Winfield =

English cricketer

Personal information
- Full name: Hugh Mervyn Winfield
- Born: 13 June 1933; Gainsborough, Lincolnshire, England
- Died: 18 October 2014 (aged 81); Nottingham, England
- Batting: Right-handed
- Role: Batter

Domestic team information
- Years: Team
- 1970–1971: Lincolnshire
- 1967–1969: Shropshire
- 1954–1966: Nottinghamshire

Career statistics
Competition	First-class	List A
Matches	172	3
Runs scored	6,799	37
Batting average	23.04	18.50
100s/50s	7/30	–/–
Top score	134	23
Balls bowled	4	–
Wickets	–	–
Bowling average	–	–
5 wickets in innings	–	–
10 wickets in match	–	–
Best bowling	–	–
Catches/stumpings	133/–	–/–
- Source: Cricinfo, 11 July 2011

Hugh Mervyn Winfield (13 June 1933 – 18 October 2014) was an English cricketer. Winfield was a right-handed batsman. He was born in Gainsborough, Lincolnshire.

Having played for the Nottinghamshire Second XI since 1951, Winfield made his first-class debut for Nottinghamshire against Surrey in the 1954 County Championship. He made 171 further first-class appearances for Nottinghamshire, the last of which came against Leicestershire in the 1966 County Championship. In his 172 first-class matches, he scored 6,799 runs at an average of 23.04. He scored 30 fifties and 7 centuries. His highest first-class score of 137 came against Glamorgan in the 1962 County Championship. His innings was described by a Harry Richards in the match report: "Winfield placing his strokes well and getting right behind the ball, was the rock on which the Glamorgan attack broke. Throughout his long stay he never gave a semblance of a chance." Winfield was also an able fielder, taking 133 catches in his career. He only averaged over 30 in a season once during his career, scoring 1,552 runs in 1959, also the most runs he scored in a season. He passed 1,000 runs over the next three seasons, but thereafter he struggled for form and found opportunities lacking as he neared the end of his career.

Toward the end of his career, List A cricket was introduced. He made a single appearance in this format for Nottinghamshire against Yorkshire in the 1963 Gillette Cup, Nottinghamshire's first List A match. In this match, he scored 23 runs before being dismissed by Fred Trueman.

He joined Shropshire in 1967, making his debut against Cambridgeshire in the Minor Counties Championship. He played Minor counties cricket for Shropshire from 1967 to 1969, making 27 Minor Counties Championship appearances. Leaving Shropshire at the end of the 1969 season to move to his native county of Lincolnshire in 1970, Winfield made his debut for the county in that seasons Minor Counties Championship against Shropshire. He played in Minor counties cricket for Lincolnshire in 1970 and 1971, making 10 appearances in the Minor Counties Championship. He appeared in 2 List A matches for his native county. The first came against Northumberland in the 1st round of the 1971 Gillette Cup, a match which Lincolnshire won by 8 wickets, with Winfield not being required to bat. Lincolnshire played Warwickshire in the 2nd round, with him scoring 14 runs before being dismissed by Norman McVicker. Lincolnshire lost the match by the wide margin of 158 runs.
