= John Hargreaves (cricketer) =

English cricketer

Personal information
- Full name: John Michael Hargreaves
- Born: 24 February 1944 (age 82); Gainsborough, Lincolnshire, England
- Batting: Left-handed
- Bowling: Right-arm off break
- Relatives: Herbert Hargreaves (father)

Domestic team information
- Years: Team
- 1963–1981: Suffolk

Career statistics
| Competition | List A |
|---|---|
| Matches | 1 |
| Runs scored | 2 |
| Batting average | 2.00 |
| 100s/50s | –/– |
| Top score | 2 |
| Balls bowled | 66 |
| Wickets | 2 |
| Bowling average | 22.00 |
| 5 wickets in innings | – |
| 10 wickets in match | – |
| Best bowling | 2/44 |
| Catches/stumpings | –/– |
- Source: Cricinfo, 8 July 2011

John Michael Hargreaves (born 25 February 1944) is a former English cricketer. Hargreaves was a left-handed batsman who bowled right-arm off break. He was born in Gainsborough, Lincolnshire.

Hargreaves made his debut for Suffolk in the 1963 Minor Counties Championship against Buckinghamshire. Hargreaves played Minor counties cricket for Suffolk from 1963 to 1981, making 60 Minor Counties Championship appearances. He made his only List A appearance against Kent in the 1966 Gillette Cup. In this match, he took the wickets of Brian Luckhurst and Bob Wilson for the cost of 44 runs from 11 overs. With the bat, he was dismissed for 2 runs by Colin Cowdrey.

His father, Herbert, also played first-class cricket for Yorkshire County Cricket Club, as well as Minor counties cricket for Suffolk.
