= Thomas Mozley =

English clergyman and writer associated with the Oxford Movement

Thomas Mozley (1806 – 17 June 1893) was an English clergyman and writer associated with the Oxford Movement.

== Early life ==
Mozley was born at Gainsborough, Lincolnshire, the son of a bookseller and publisher. His brother, James Bowling Mozley, would become known for his own theological works. From Queen Elizabeth Grammar School, Gainsborough and Charterhouse School he progressed to Oriel College, Oxford in 1825, where he became the pupil, and subsequently the great friend, of John Henry Newman. In 1831, he was ordained, after which he became curate of Colchester, leaving a year later to take over the rectorship of Moreton Pinkney. He asked to leave four years later and in 1836 became rector of Cholderton, Wiltshire. In September of that year, he married Newman's younger sister Harriet, creating a family connection to his mentor.

== Tractarian ==
From the beginning, Mozley was a strong supporter of the Tractarian movement. After contributing for some time to the British Critic, its periodical, Mozley succeeded Newman as editor in July 1841.

In 1843, he was on the point of joining the Roman Catholic Church. Newman, however, strongly advised him to take two years to reflect, and Mozley decided to remain an Anglican. In 1844, he began to write leading articles for The Times, and continued to do so regularly for many years. Newman's own conversion to Catholicism in 1845 broke the connection between Mozley and Newman, who stopped their correspondence.

In 1847, Mozley resigned from his country living and settled in London.

== Later life ==
In 1868, he accepted the living of Plymtree in Devon. Mozley published his Letters From Rome, from 1869 to 1870, covering the convening of Vatican I. From 1876 to 1880, he was rural dean of Ottery St Mary, Devon. He retired in 1880, and moved to Cheltenham, where he died.

== Works ==
Mozley was the author of Reminiscences, Chiefly of Oriel, and the Oxford Movement, published in 1882, which details a history of the Oxford Movement and Mozley's own connection to it. Critical reception of the work has been mixed.

Other works were:

- Henry VII, Prince Arthur, and Cardinal Morton, from a Group representing the Adoration of the Three Kings on the Chancel Screen of Plymtree Church, 1878.
- Reminiscences, chiefly of Towns, Villages, and Schools, 2 vols., 1885.
- The Word, 1889.
- The Son, 1891.
- Letters from Rome on the Occasion of the Œcumenical Council, 1869-1870, 2 vols., 1891.
- The Creed, or a Philosophy, 1893, with a short autobiographical preface.

Mozley also published a Letter to the Rev. Canon Bull, 1882, and contributed to the British Critic, and other periodicals, besides The Times.
