= Rex Woods (artist) =

Canadian artist (1903–1987)

Rex Woods (21 July 1903 – 18 November 1987) was an English-born Canadian artist and illustrator in Toronto, Ontario.

== History ==
Born Reginald Norman Woods in Gainsborough, Lincolnshire, England, Woods came to Toronto as a young man in 1920 and studied at the Ontario College of Art. After graduating, he worked in various Toronto art studios. In 1928 he married Etheldreda Jeanne Mott, a ballet dancer with the Metropolitan Opera Company. Sometime in the 1930s, Woods decided to work independently and quickly became one of Canada's most successful and sought-after illustrators. He contributed on a regular basis to popular magazines such as Maclean's and the Canadian Home Journal, and drew advertisements for many of Canada's leading companies. He painted one of the most iconic Canadian images of the twentieth century, The Macdonald's Lassie, used for decades by Macdonald Tobacco on their Export "A" brand of cigarettes. Not so widely known is his important monumental group portrait of the Fathers of Confederation, a copy of the original by Robert Harris destroyed in the fire on Parliament Hill in 1916. The copy is a liberal recreation in which Woods added three figures to the original composition. The picture was commissioned by Confederation Life Assurance and donated as a centennial gift to the country in 1967. It hangs in Parliament.

Woods's commercial illustrations are indicative of several threads in the popular culture of Canada between 1930 and 1950. His magazine covers often objectify and idealize women but this work is perhaps more reflective of his clients and their market than the artist's own attitude. Certainly he was watching the work of major American illustrators such as JC Leyendecker, since Woods borrows some of Leyendecker's trademark white-on-white brushstrokes and New Year's baby themes. Unlike Norman Rockwell, to whom he has also been logically compared, some of Woods's pictures, such as The Vision of the Cross (1935, ROM 998.86.110) are profoundly disturbing and are indicative of his long-standing objections to war.

From the time it was newly built, Woods lived with his wife in the same Toronto apartment. Long-standing residents of the building reported that the apartment became a repository for a huge body of his work. Woods's obituary was published in the Toronto Star on 19 November 1987. Jeanne died in 1996 without heirs or successors; much of Woods's material came as a gift from her estate to the Royal Ontario Museum. Woods's style was instantly recognizable in his own time and his work was widely circulated in almost every part of Canada. After he ceased to be active, however, Woods fell into virtual oblivion. In recent years there has been a revival of interest in Woods and his imagery. An untitled display, with few interpretive panels, appeared at the Royal Ontario Museum in the winter of 2009–10, and comprised 17 works, chiefly Canadian Home Journal cover art.

== Collections and archives ==
The main collection of Rex Woods material is held in the Royal Ontario Museum with key pieces illustrated in ROM Images, the museum's online collection service. However the archive, which is extensive and includes photographs, documents and other works, has not been catalogued and is not accessible to the public or specialist researchers.

== See also ==
- Canadian art
- List of Canadian artists
- List of Canadian insurance companies
