= Gainsborough Urban District =

Former local government area in the UK

Gainsborough
- Gainsborough Urban District shown within Parts of Lindsey in 1970
- Area
  - 1911: 2,406 acres (9.74 km^{2})
  - 1961: 2,406 acres (9.74 km^{2})
- Population
  - 1911: 20,587
  - 1961: 17,278
- History
  - Created: 1894
  - Abolished: 1974
  - Succeeded by: West Lindsey
- Status: Urban District
- Government: Gainsborough Urban District Council
  - HQ: Gainsborough

Gainsborough was an Urban District in Parts of Lindsey, Lincolnshire, England, from 1894 to 1974. It was created under the Local Government Act 1894.

The district was abolished in 1974 under the Local Government Act 1972 and combined with various other local government districts in the western part of Lindsey to form the new West Lindsey district.
